= Indiana =

U.S. state

- State
- Flag Seal
- Nickname: "The Hoosier State"
- Motto: "Crossroads of America"
- Anthem: "On the Banks of the Wabash, Far Away"
- Location of Indiana within the United States
- Country: United States
- Before statehood: Indiana Territory
- Admitted to the Union: December 11, 1816 (19th)
- Capital (and largest city): Indianapolis
- Largest county or equivalent: Marion
- Largest metro and urban areas: Indianapolis

Government
  - Governor: Mike Braun (R)
  - Lieutenant Governor: Micah Beckwith (R)
- Legislature: General Assembly
  - Upper house: Indiana Senate
  - Lower house: Indiana House of Representatives
- Judiciary: Indiana Supreme Court
- U.S. senators: Todd Young (R); Jim Banks (R)
- U.S. House delegation: 7 Republicans; 2 Democrats; (list)

Area
  - Total: 36,418 sq mi (94,321 km^{2})
  - Land: 35,868 sq mi (92,897 km^{2})
  - Water: 550 sq mi (1,424 km^{2}) 1.5%
  - Rank: 38th

Dimensions
  - Length: 268 mi (432 km)
  - Width: 144 mi (232 km)
- Elevation: 690 ft (210 m)
- Highest elevation (Hoosier Hill (Note: Elevation adjusted to North American Vertical Datum of 1988)): 1,257 ft (383 m)
- Lowest elevation (Confluence of Ohio River and Wabash River): 318 ft (97 m)

Population (2025)
  - Total: ▲6,973,333
  - Rank: 17th
  - Density: 189/sq mi (73.1/km^{2})
  - Rank: 17th
  - Median household income: $69,500 (2023)
  - Income rank: 37th
- Demonym: Hoosier

Language
  - Official language: English

Time zones
- Most of the state: UTC−05:00 (EST)
  - Summer (DST): UTC−04:00 (EDT)
- 12 remaining counties in the northwest and southwest: UTC−06:00 (CST)
  - Summer (DST): UTC−05:00 (CDT)
- USPS abbreviation: IN
- ISO 3166 code: US-IN
- Traditional abbreviation: Ind.
- Latitude: 37° 46′ N to 41° 46′ N
- Longitude: 84° 47′ W to 88° 6′ W
- Website: in.gov

State symbols of Indiana
List of state symbols
- Flag of Indiana

- Seal of Indiana
- Poem: "Indiana"
- Slogan: "IN Indiana"

Living insignia
- Bird: Northern cardinal (Cardinalis cardinalis)
- Flower: Peony (Paeonia)
- Insect: Say's firefly (Pyractomena angulata)
- Tree: Tulip tree (Liriodendron tulipifera)

Inanimate insignia
- Color(s): Blue and gold
- Firearm: Grouseland Rifle
- Food: Popcorn (state snack)
- Fossil: Mastodon (Mammut americanum)
- Rock: Indiana limestone
- Other: Wabash River (state river); Republic P-47 Thunderbolt Hoosier Spirit II (state aircraft)

State route marker

State quarter
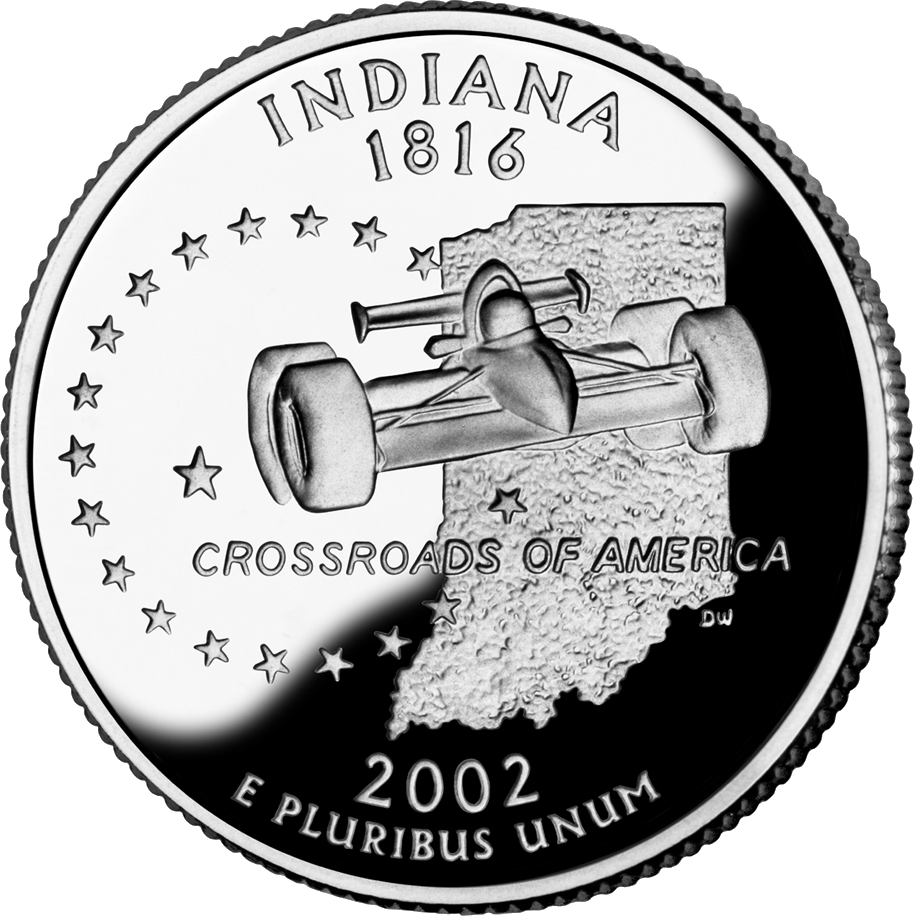
- Released in 2002

Indiana (/ˌɪndiˈænə/ IN-dee-AN-ə) is a state in the Midwestern region of the United States. It borders Lake Michigan to the northwest, Michigan to the north and northeast, Ohio to the east, the Ohio River and Kentucky to the south and southeast, and the Wabash River and Illinois to the west. Nicknamed "the Hoosier State", Indiana is the 38th-largest by area and the 17th-most populous of the 50 states. The state's capital and largest city is Indianapolis. Indiana was admitted to the Union as the 19th state on December 11, 1816.

Indigenous resistance to American settlement was broken with their defeat in Battle of Tippecanoe in 1811, and the collapse of Tecumseh's confederacy in 1813. The new settlers were primarily Americans of British ancestry from the eastern seaboard and the Upland South, and Germans. After the Civil War, in which the state fought for the Union, natural gas attracted heavy industry and new European immigrants to its northern counties. In the first half of the 20th century, northern and central sections experienced a boom in goods manufacture and automobile production. Southern Indiana remained largely rural. After the rise and fall of the Klan in the 1920s, the state swung politically from the Republican to Democratic Party in the New Deal 1930s. Today, with a decades-long record of returning Republican majorities, Indiana is counted a "red state".

Indiana has a diverse economy with a gross state product in 2023 of 404.3 billion. Indianapolis is at the center of the state's largest metropolitan area, with a population of over two million. The Fort Wayne metro area follows with a population of 645,000.

The state's largest city, Indianapolis, is home to professional sports teams, including the NFL's Indianapolis Colts, the NBA's Indiana Pacers, and the WNBA's Indiana Fever. The city also hosts several notable competitive events, such as the Indianapolis 500, held at Indianapolis Motor Speedway.

== Etymology ==
Indiana's name means "Land of the Indians", or simply "Indian Land". (Note: An earlier use of the name dates to the 1760s, when it referenced a tract of land under control of the Commonwealth of Virginia, but the area's name was discarded when it became a part of that state. See Hodgin, Cyrus (1903). "The Naming of Indiana" (PDF transcription). Papers of the Wayne County, Indiana, Historical Society. 1 (1): 3–11.) It also stems from Indiana's territorial history. On May 7, 1800, the United States Congress passed legislation to divide the Northwest Territory into two areas and named the western section the Indiana Territory. In 1816, when Congress passed an Enabling Act to begin the process of establishing statehood for Indiana, a part of this territorial land became the geographic area for the new state. (Note: A portion of the Northwest Territory's eastern section became the state of Ohio in 1803. The Michigan Territory was established in 1805 from part of the Indiana Territory's northern lands and four years later, in 1809, the Illinois counties were separated from the Indiana Territory to create the Illinois Territory. See Barnhart, John D.; Riker, Dorothy L. (1971). Indiana to 1816: The Colonial Period. The History of Indiana. Vol. I. Indianapolis: Indiana Historical Bureau and the Indiana Historical Society. pp. 311–13, 337, 353, 355, 432.)

Formal use of the word Indiana dates from 1768, when a Philadelphia-based trading company gave its land claim in present-day West Virginia the name "Indiana" in honor of its previous owners, the Iroquois. Later, ownership of the claim was transferred to the Indiana Land Company, the first recorded use of the word Indiana. But the Virginia colony argued that it was the rightful owner of the land because it fell within its geographic boundaries. The U.S. Supreme Court denied the land company's right to the claim in 1798.

=== Hoosier ===
A native or resident of Indiana is known as a Hoosier. The etymology of this word is disputed, but the leading theory, advanced by the Indiana Historical Bureau and the Indiana Historical Society, has its origin in Virginia, Kentucky, the Carolinas, and Tennessee (the Upland South) as a term for a backwoodsman, a rough countryman, or a country bumpkin.

== History ==
=== Indigenous inhabitants ===
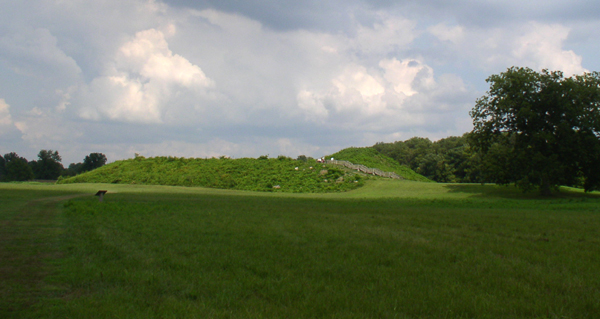
Angel Mounds State Historic Site was one of the northernmost Mississippian culture settlements, occupied from 1100 to 1450.

The first inhabitants in what is now Indiana were the Paleo-Indians, who arrived about 8000 BC after the melting of the glaciers at the end of the Ice Age. Divided into small groups, the Paleo-Indians were nomads who hunted large game such as mastodons. They created stone tools made out of chert by chipping, knapping and flaking.

The Archaic period between 5000 and 4000 BC saw the development of new ground-stone tools the building of earthwork mounds and middens, suggesting that settlements were becoming more permanent. The Woodland period began around 1500 BC marked by ceramics and pottery and the extended cultivation of plants eventually including crops such as corn and squash, and the development of long-term trade, notably by the Hopewell people.

The Mississippian culture emerged, lasting from 1000 AD until the 15th century, shortly before the arrival of Europeans. During this stage, people created large urban settlements designed according to their cosmology, with large mounds and plazas defining ceremonial and public spaces. The concentrated settlements depended on the agricultural surpluses. One such complex was the Angel Mounds. They had large public areas such as plazas and platform mounds, where leaders lived or conducted rituals. Mississippian civilization collapsed in Indiana during the mid-15th century for reasons that remain unclear.

The historic Native American tribes in the area at the time of European encounter spoke different languages of the Algonquian family. They included the Shawnee, Miami, Wea, Piankashaw, and Illini. Refugee tribes from eastern regions, including the Delaware who settled in the White and Whitewater River Valleys, later joined them.

=== European exploration and sovereignty ===
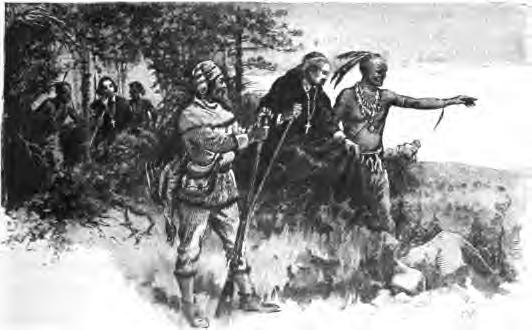
Native Indians guide French explorers through Indiana, as depicted by Maurice Thompson in Stories of Indiana

In 1679, French explorer René-Robert Cavelier, Sieur de La Salle was the first European to cross into Indiana after reaching present-day South Bend at the St. Joseph River. He was followed by French-Canadian fur traders exchanging blankets, jewelry, tools, whiskey and weapons with the Native Americans for skins.

By 1702, Sieur Juchereau established the first trading post near Vincennes. In 1715, Sieur de Vincennes built Fort Miami at Kekionga, now Fort Wayne. In 1717, another Canadian, Picote de Beletre, built Fort Ouiatenon on the Wabash River, to try to control Native American trade routes from Lake Erie to the Mississippi River.

In 1732, Sieur de Vincennes built a second fur trading post at Vincennes. In a period of a few years, British colonists arrived from the East and contended with the Canadians for control of the lucrative fur trade. Fighting between the French and British colonists occurred throughout the 1750s.

The Native American tribes of Indiana sided with the French Canadians during the French and Indian War (an episode of the Seven Years' War between the European great powers). With British victory in 1763, the French were forced to cede to the British crown all their lands in North America east of the Mississippi River and north and west of the colonies.

Tribal resistance continued with Pontiac's Rebellion and the capture of forts Ouiatenon and Miami. The Royal Proclamation of 1763 designated the land west of the Appalachians as an Indian Reserve, and excluded British colonists from the area, which the Crown called "Indian Territory". The measure was one of the first significant areas of dispute between Britain and the colonies and would become a contributing factor leading to the American Revolution.

In 1775, the American Revolutionary War began as the colonists sought self-government and independence from the British. The majority of the fighting took place near the East Coast, but the Patriot military officer George Rogers Clark called for an army to help fight the British in the west. Clark's army won significant battles and took over Vincennes and Fort Sackville on February 25, 1779.

During the war, Clark managed to cut off British troops, who were attacking the eastern colonists from the west. His success is often credited for changing the course of the American Revolutionary War. At the end of the war, through the Treaty of Paris, the British crown ceded their claims to the land south of the Great Lakes to the newly formed United States, including Native American lands.

=== The frontier ===
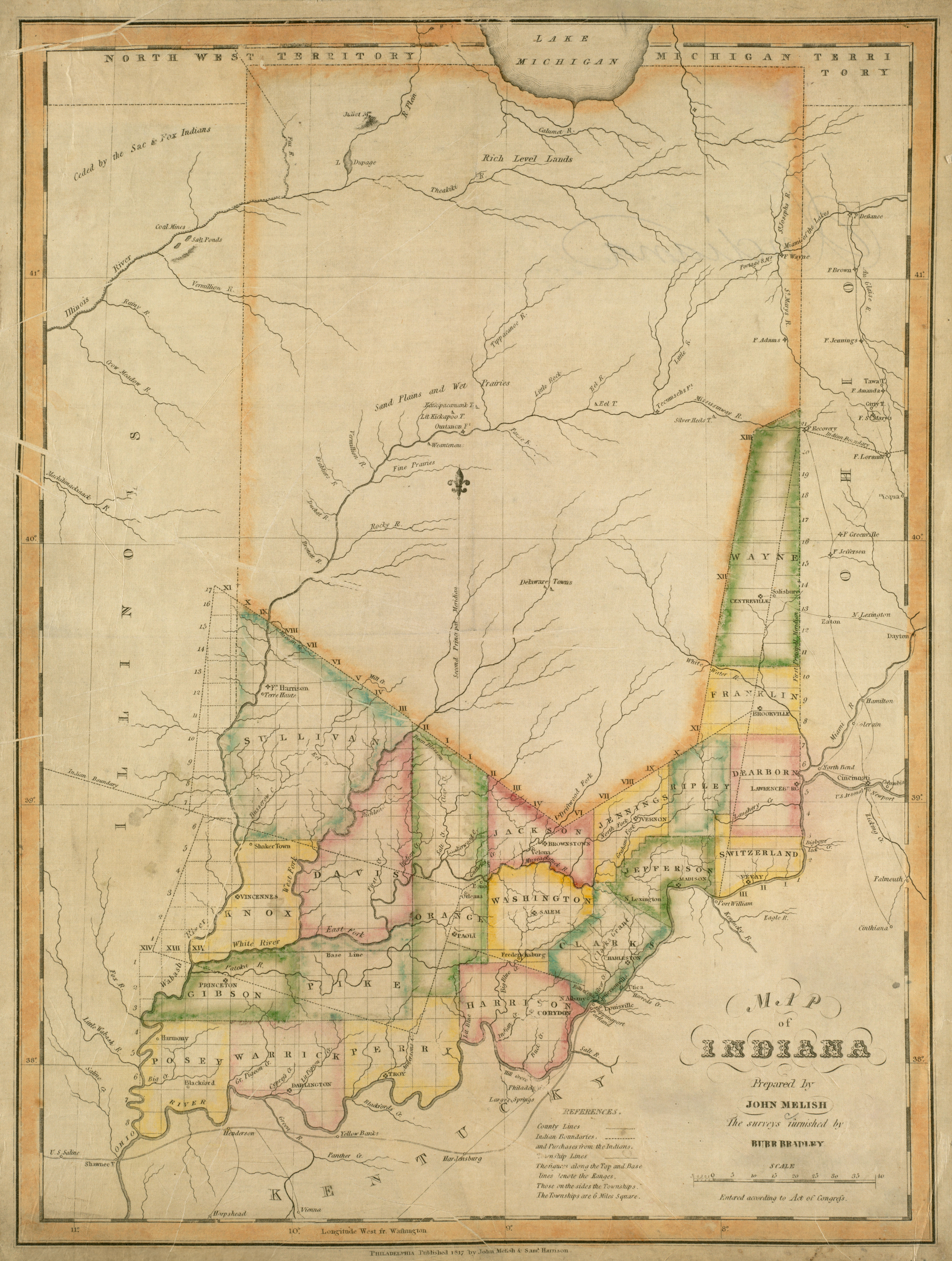
Left: A map showing extent of the treaty lands. Right: One of the first maps of Indiana (made 1816, published 1817) showing territories prior to the Treaty of St. Mary's which greatly expanded the region. Note the inaccurate placement of Lake Michigan.

In 1787, the U.S. defined the Northwest Territory which included the area of present-day Indiana. In 1800, Congress separated Ohio from the Northwest Territory, designating the rest of the land as the Indiana Territory. President Thomas Jefferson chose William Henry Harrison as the governor of the territory, and Vincennes was established as the capital. After the Michigan Territory was separated and the Illinois Territory was formed, Indiana was reduced to its current size and geography.

Starting with the Battle of Fallen Timbers in 1794 and the Treaty of Greenville in 1795, Native American titles to Indiana lands were extinguished by usurpation, purchase, or war and treaty. About half the state was acquired in the Treaty of St. Mary's from the Miami in 1818. Purchases were not complete until the Treaty of Mississinewas again with the Miami in 1826 acquired the last of the reserved Native American lands in the northeast.

By 1810, only two counties in the extreme southeast, Clark and Dearborn, had been organized by European settlers. Land titles issued out of Cincinnati were sparse. Settler migration was chiefly via flatboat on the Ohio River westerly, and by wagon trails up the Wabash/White River Valleys (west) and Whitewater River Valleys (east).

After working to maintain peaceful coexistence with the United States, the Shawnee tribal chief Tecumseh and his brother Tenskwatawa, "the Shawnee Prophet", encouraged other indigenous tribes in the territory to reject European influences, stop drinking alcohol, and resist further encroachment. Tensions rose and the U.S. authorized Harrison to launch a preemptive expedition against Tecumseh's Confederacy; the U.S. gained victory at the Battle of Tippecanoe on November 7, 1811.

In the War of 1812, the British, who had been assisted by Tecumseh in the capture of Detroit, proposed creating of an Indian barrier state to ensure the security of Upper Canada. After Tecumseh was killed in 1813 at the Battle of the Thames, resistance to United States control ended in the region. Most Native American tribes in the state were later removed to west of the Mississippi River in the 1820s and 1830s after being forced to accept the "purchase" of their lands.

=== Statehood and settlement ===
Corydon, a town in the far southern part of Indiana, was named the second capital of the Indiana Territory in May 1813 in order to decrease the threat of Native American raids following the Battle of Tippecanoe. Two years later, a petition for statehood was approved by the territorial general assembly and sent to Congress. An Enabling Act was passed to provide an election of delegates to write a constitution for Indiana. On June 10, 1816, delegates assembled at Corydon to write a state constitution, which was completed in 19 days. Jonathan Jennings was elected the fledgling state's first governor in August 1816. President James Madison approved Indiana's admission into the union as the nineteenth state on December 11, 1816. In 1825, the state capital was moved from Corydon to Indianapolis.

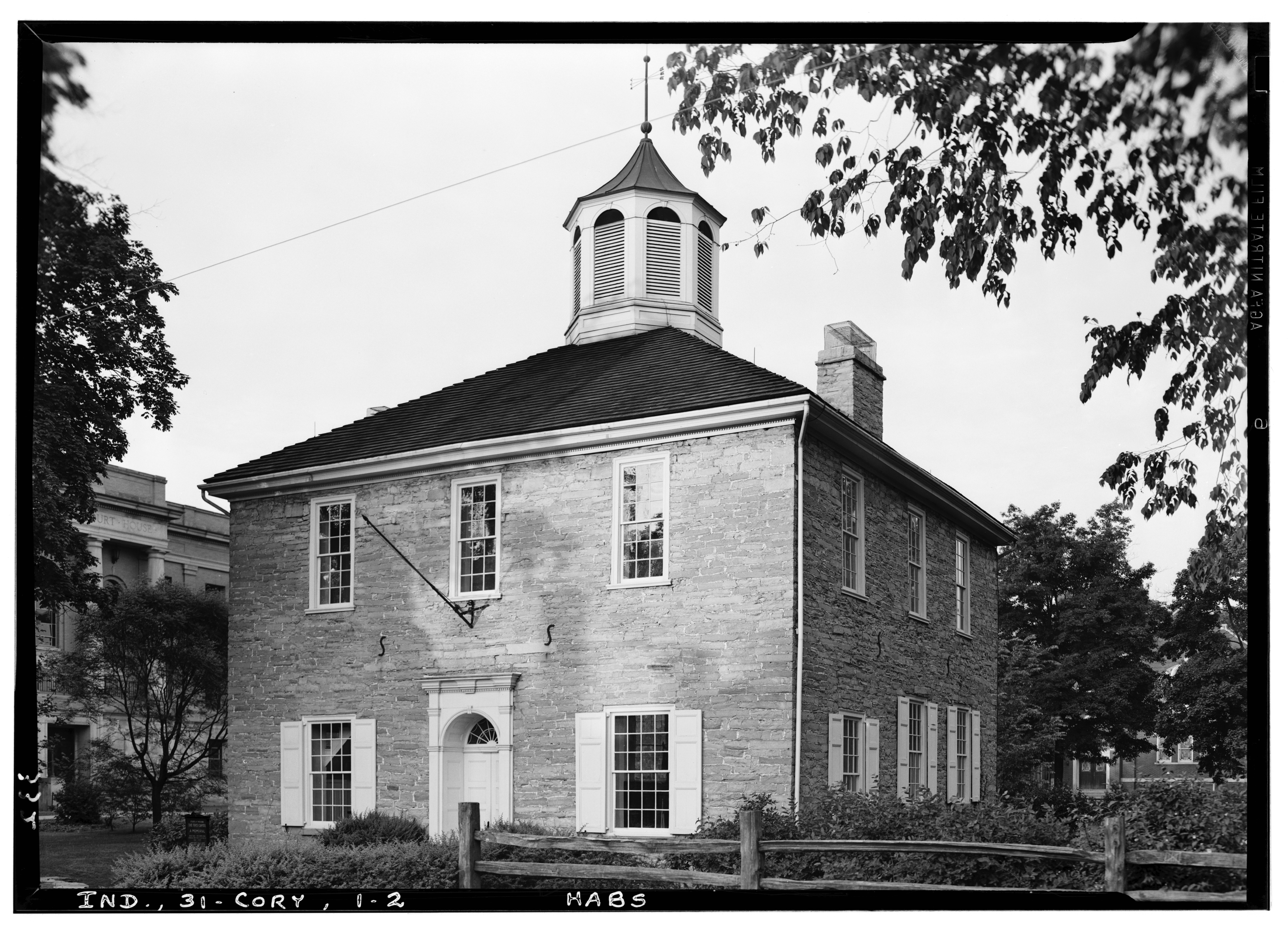
Indiana's Capitol Building in Corydon served as the state's seat of government from 1816 until 1825.

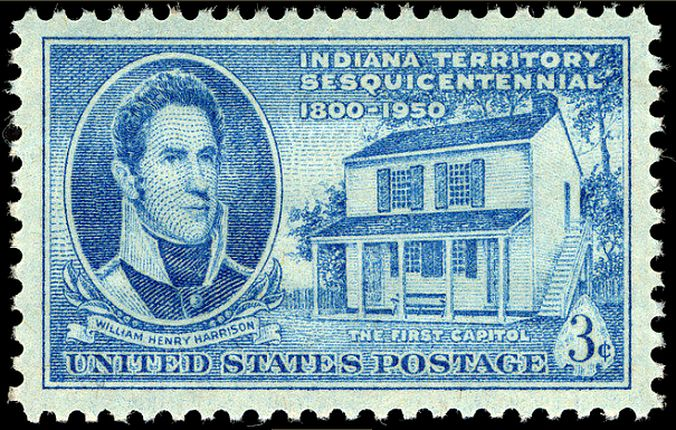
1950 postal issue of Harrison commemorating Indiana's 150th anniversary of statehood

Many European immigrants went west to settle in Indiana in the early 19th century. The largest immigrant group to settle in Indiana were Germans (German remains the largest ancestry reported in Indiana), as well as many immigrants from Ireland and England. Americans who were primarily ethnically English migrated from the Northern Tier of New York and New England, as well as from the mid-Atlantic state of Pennsylvania. The arrival of steamboats on the Ohio River in 1811, and the National Road at Richmond in 1829, greatly facilitated settlement of northern and western Indiana.

Following statehood, the new government worked to transform Indiana from a frontier into a developed, well-populated, and thriving state, beginning significant demographic and economic changes. In 1836, the state's founders initiated a program, the Indiana Mammoth Internal Improvement Act, that led to the construction of roads, canals, railroads and state-funded public schools. The plans bankrupted the state and were a financial disaster, but increased land and produce value more than fourfold. In response to the crisis and in order to avert another, in 1851, a second constitution was adopted, which prohibited public debt. At the same time, however, it included a mandate for a "uniform system of common schools, equally open to all and free of tuition."

In a reaction against an influx of free people of color and emancipated slaves who had been expelled from slave states, Article 13 of the new constitution sought to bar their further immigration into Indiana and proposed their resettlement in Liberia. Citing the newly passed Thirteenth Amendment to the U.S. Constitution, the Indiana Supreme Court struck down the article in 1866, and it was removed by amendment in 1881. Nevertheless, numerous communities and counties implemented practices to exclude African Americans. These jurisdictions, known as "sundown towns", were prevalent during the 1890s.

=== Civil War and late 19th-century industry ===
Indiana was the first western state to mobilize for the United States in the American Civil War, and soldiers from Indiana participated in all the war's major engagements. In 1861, Indiana was assigned a quota of 7,500 soldiers to join the Union Army. So many volunteered in the first call that thousands had to be turned away. Before the war ended, Indiana had contributed 208,367 organized in 126 infantry regiments, 26 batteries of artillery and 13 regiments of cavalry to the Union. Casualties were over 35% of the enlisted: 24,416 men lost their lives and over 50,000 more were wounded. The only Civil War conflicts fought in Indiana were the Newburgh Raid, a bloodless capture of the city; and the Battle of Corydon, which occurred during Morgan's Raid leaving 15 dead, 40 wounded, and 355 captured.

After the war, Indiana remained a largely agricultural state. Post-war industries included mining, including limestone extraction; meatpacking; food processing, such as milling grain, distilling it into alcohol; and the building of wagons, buggies, farm machinery, and hardware. However, the discovery of natural gas in the 1880s in northern Indiana led to an economic boom: the abundant and cheap fuel attracted heavy industry; the availability of jobs, in turn, attracted new settlers from other parts of the country as well as from Europe. This led to the rapid expansion of cities such as South Bend, Indianapolis, and Fort Wayne.

=== Early 20th century ===
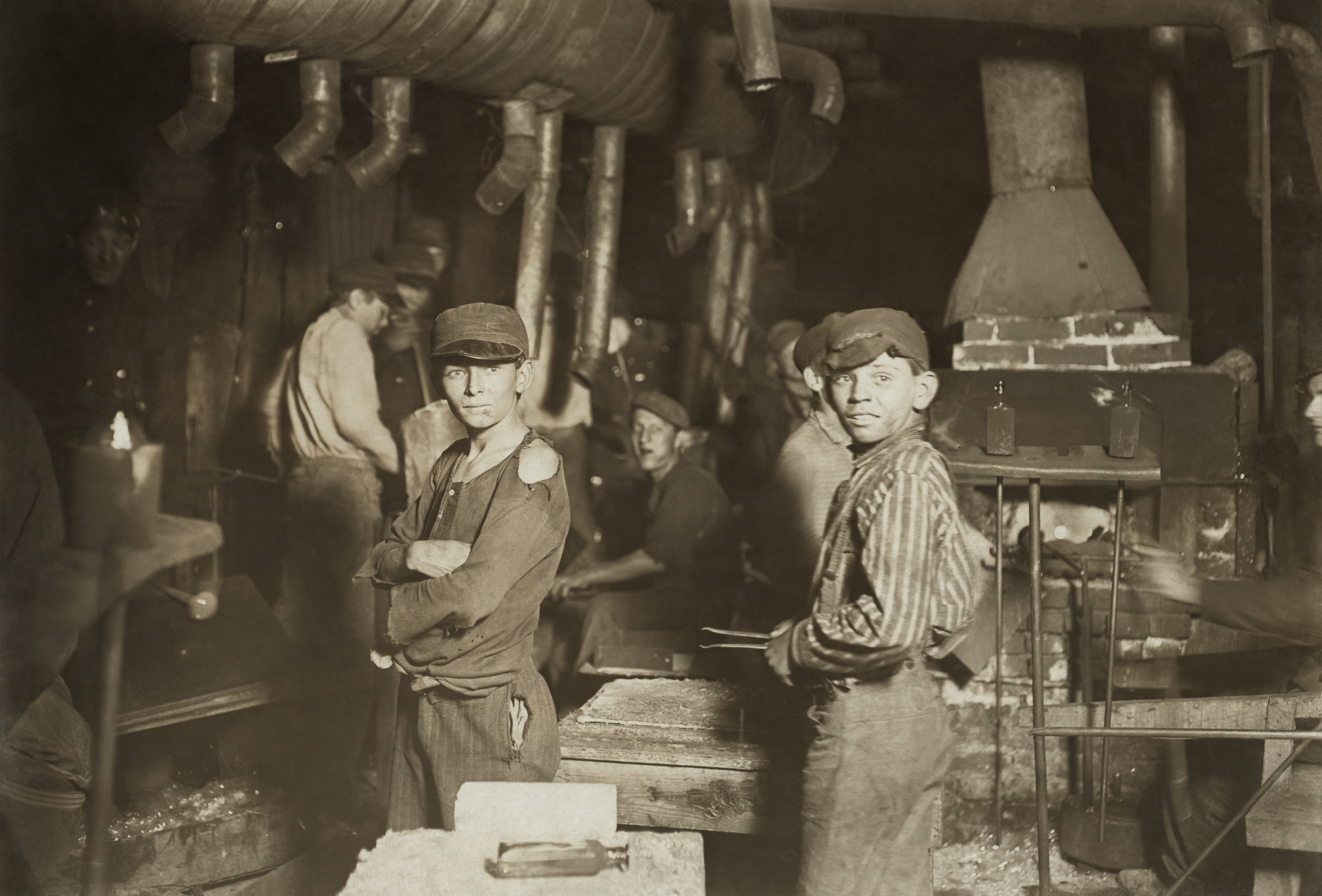
Child labor in Indiana glassworks, 1908, by Lewis Hine

The early decades of the 20th century saw Indiana develop into a leading manufacturing state with heavy industry concentrating in the north. In 1906 the United States Steel Corporation created a new industrial city on Lake Michigan named Gary, after Elbert Henry Gary, its founding chairman. With industrialization, workers developed labor unions (their strike activities induced governor James P. Goodrich to declare martial law in Gary in 1919) and a Socialist Party. Railroader Eugene Debs of Terre Haute, the Socialist candidate received 901,551 votes (6.0% of the national vote) in the 1912 presidential election. Suffrage movements also arose to enfranchise women.

In its earlier years, Indiana was a leader in the automobile boom. Beginning its production in Kokomo in 1896, Haynes-Apperson was the nation's first commercially successful auto company. The importance of vehicle and parts manufacture to the state was symbolized by the construction in 1909 of the Indianapolis Motor Speedway.

In the 1920s, state politics was heavily influenced by the rise of the Indiana Klan. First organized in 1915 as a branch of the Ku Klux Klan, it appealed to white Protestants alarmed by social and economic trends, including changes induced by immigration from southern and central Europe. In the name of defending "hundred-per-cent Americanism", the Klan sought to exclude from public life "Bolsheviks, Catholics, Jews, Negroes, bootleggers, pacifists, evolutionists, foreigners, and all persons it considered immoral".

By 1925 the Klan had 250,000 members, an estimated 30% of native-born white men. By 1925 over half the elected members of the Indiana General Assembly, the governor of Indiana, and many other high-ranking officials in local and state government were members of the Klan. Politicians had also learned they needed Klan endorsement to win office. That year, "Grand Dragon" D.C. Stephenson, who had begun to brag "I am the law in Indiana", was charged and convicted for the rape and murder of Madge Oberholtzer, a young school teacher. Denied pardon, in 1927 Stephenson gave the Indianapolis Times lists of people the Klan had paid. Partly as a result of compounded scandal, membership collapsed.

Throughout the 1930s, New Deal Democrats topped the polls and "the Klan was political poison". During those years, Indiana, like the rest of the nation, was affected by the Great Depression: businesses were shuttered and farm income collapsed. The numbers seeking employment, shelter and relief were augmented by out-of-state Dust Bowl migrants. Swept into office in the nationwide landslide for Franklin Roosevelt in 1932, Democratic governor Paul V. McNutt, called on Hoosiers to "prove that government may be a great instrument of human progress", and struggled to build a state-funded welfare system to help overwhelmed private charities. He reorganized state government, greatly enlarging his executive powers, introduced state income tax and ended Prohibition. On several occasions, he declared martial law to put an end to worker strikes.

World War II helped lift Indiana's economy, as the war required steel, food and other goods the state produced. Roughly 10% of Indiana's population joined the armed forces, while hundreds of industries earned war production contracts and began making war material. Indiana manufactured 4.5% of total U.S. military armaments during World War II, ranking eighth among the 48 states. The expansion of industry to meet war demands helped end the Great Depression.

=== Post World War II ===
With economic recovery, the Republican supremacy in the state was restored. Manufacturers became the primary employers, a trend that continued into the 1960s. Urbanization during the 1950s and 1960s led to substantial growth in the state's cities. The auto, steel and pharmaceutical industries topped Indiana's major businesses. Indiana's population continued to grow after the war, exceeding five million by the 1970 census.

In the early 1960s, Democrats briefly returned to state office, and under the administration of Matthew E. Welsh the state adopted its first sales tax of 2%. Indiana schools were desegregated in 1949. In 1950, the U.S. Census Bureau reported Indiana's population as 95.5% white and 4.4% black. Governor Welsh also worked with the General Assembly to pass the Indiana Civil Rights Bill, granting equal protection to minorities in seeking employment.

The 1973 oil crisis created a recession that hurt the automotive industry in Indiana. Companies began a long series of downsizing that contributed to high unemployment rates in long-established manufacturing centers such as Anderson, Gary, Muncie, and Kokomo. The trend continued until the 1980s when the national and state economy began to diversify from heavy industry toward services and high-tech manufacturing, and to recover. Meanwhile, the farm crisis of the 1980s accelerated rural flight and farm consolidation, a trend that has resumed in the 21st century.

=== 21st century ===
On March 6, 2020, following the first confirmed case of COVID-19 in the state, Governor Eric Holcomb and state health officials declared a public health emergency. After a period in which there were a number of pandemic-related restrictions and advisories, and sharp job cuts, Holcomb signed a bill to end the emergency on March 3, 2022.

At that point, employment had already recovered, but in comparative terms state appeared, post-COVID, to face greater challenges. In 2025 Indiana's economy (the state's business environment, labor market and overall economic growth) ranked 40th in the first U.S. News & World Report's annual report on how well all 50 states in the United States serve citizens, down from 25th in 2018.

Indiana's highest ranking on the 2025 "scorecard" was 16th in the opportunity category. It was 30th in economic opportunity, and 39th in equality, but benefitted from being 18th in affordability (by comparison New Hampshire, which was 1st in economic opportunity and 3rd in equality, was 42nd in affordability). Its lowest score was for pollution and natural environment, with Indiana ranking worst among the 50 states.

== Geography ==
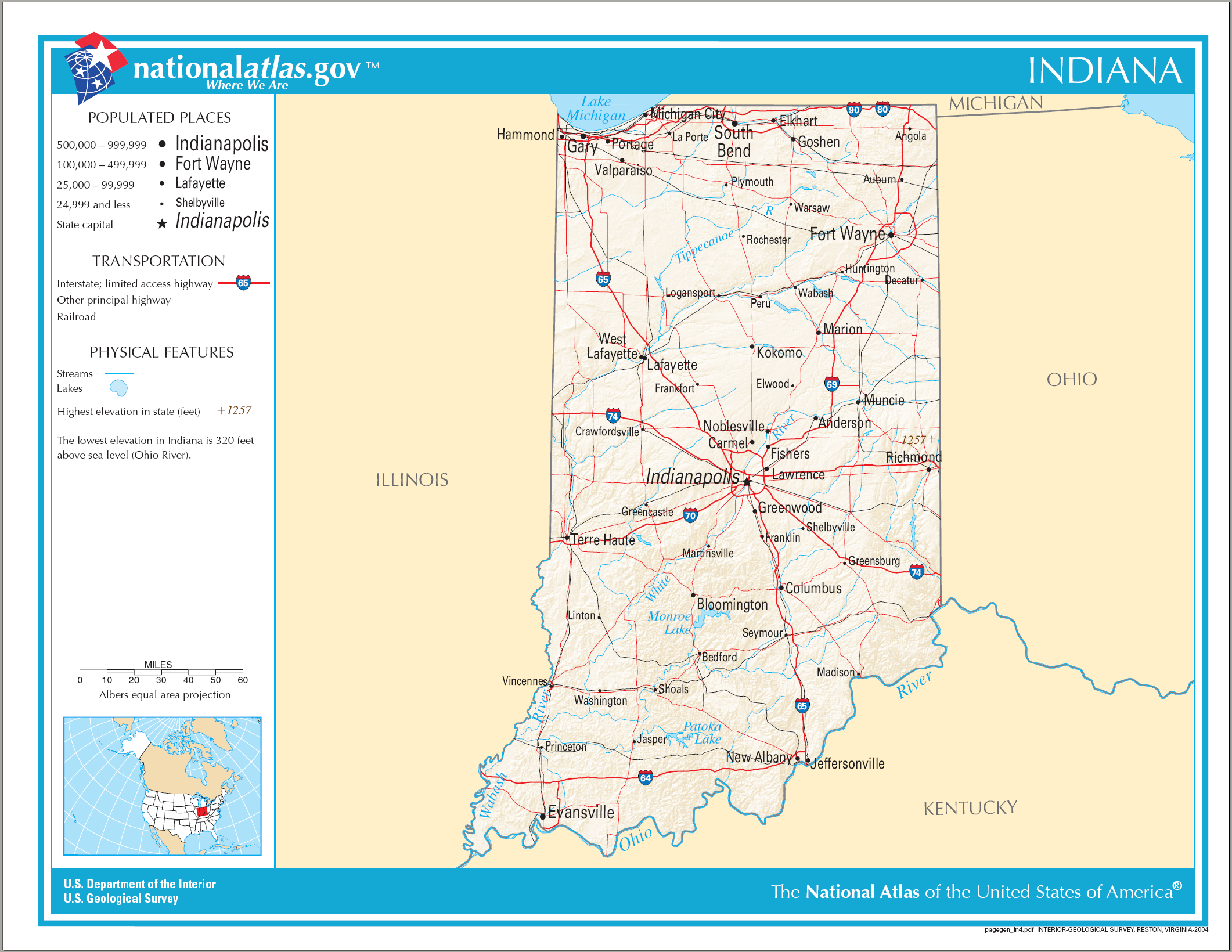

With a total area (land and water) of 36,418 square miles (94,320 km^{2}), Indiana ranks as the 38th largest state in size. The state has a maximum dimension north to south of 250 miles (400 km) and a maximum east to west dimension of 145 miles (233 km). The state's geographic center (39° 53.7'N, 86° 16.0W) is in Marion County.

Located in the Midwestern United States, Indiana is one of eight states that make up the Great Lakes Region. Indiana is bordered on the north by Michigan, on the east by Ohio, and on the west by Illinois, partially separated by the Wabash River. Lake Michigan borders Indiana on the northwest and the Ohio River separates Indiana from Kentucky on the south.

=== Geology and terrain ===
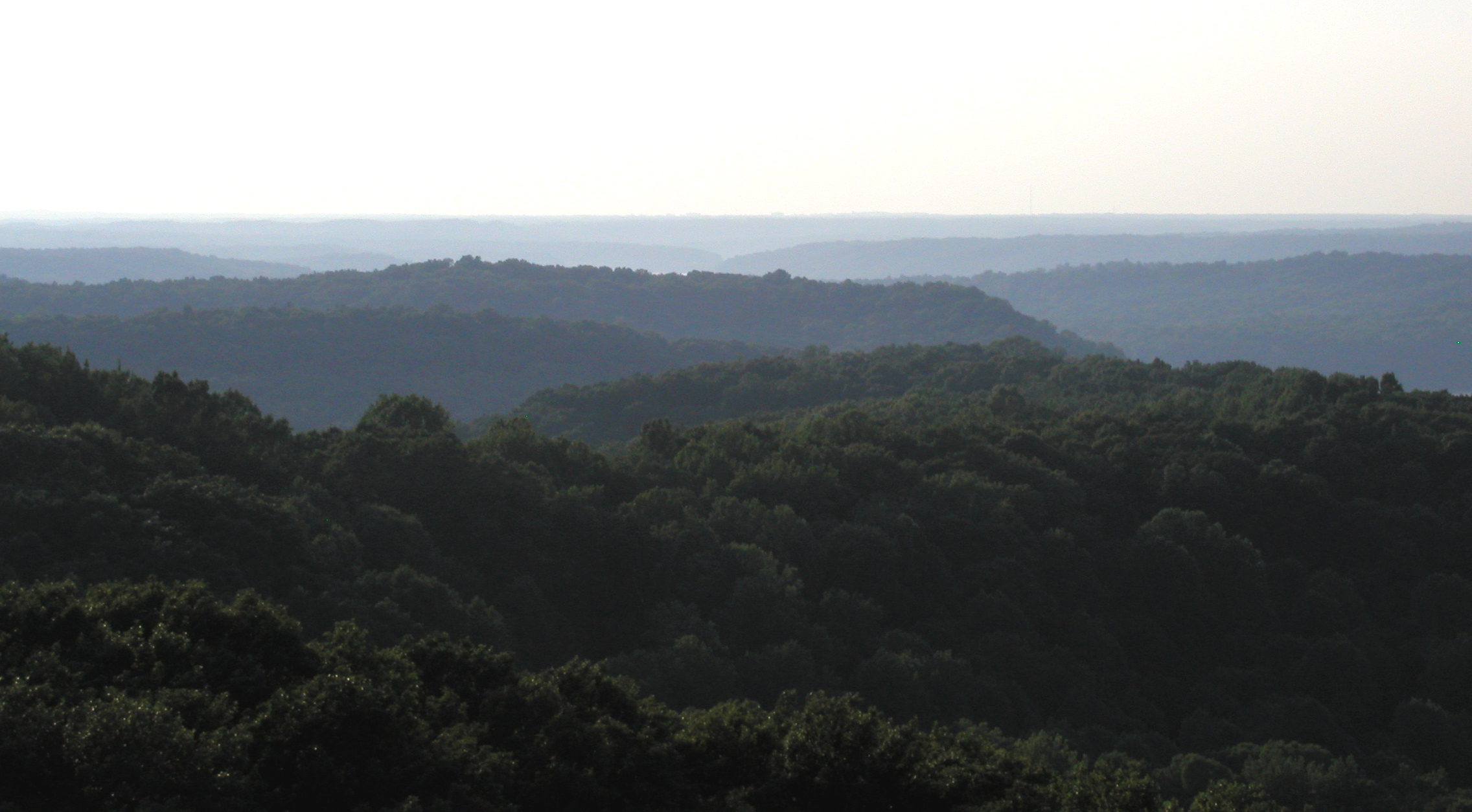
Rolling hills in the Charles C. Deam Wilderness Area of Hoosier National Forest, in the Indiana Uplands

The average altitude of Indiana is about 760 feet (230 m) above sea level. The highest point in the state is Hoosier Hill in Wayne County at 1,257 feet (383 m) above sea level. The lowest point at 320 feet (98 m) above sea level is in Posey County, where the Wabash River meets the Ohio River. The resulting elevation span, 937 feet (286 m), is the narrowest of any non-coastal U.S. state. Only 2,850 square miles (7,400 km^{2}) have an altitude greater than 1,000 feet (300 m) and this area is enclosed within 14 counties. About 4,700 square miles (12,000 km^{2}) have an elevation of less than 500 feet (150 m), mostly concentrated along the Ohio and lower Wabash Valleys, from Tell City and Terre Haute to Evansville and Mount Vernon.

The state includes two natural regions of the United States: the Central Lowlands and the Interior Low Plateaus. The till plains make up the northern and central regions of Indiana. Much of its appearance is a result of elements left behind by glaciers. Central Indiana is mainly flat with some low rolling hills (except where rivers cut deep valleys through the plain, like at the Wabash River and Sugar Creek) and soil composed of glacial sands, gravel and clay, which results in exceptional farmland. Northern Indiana is similar, except for the presence of higher and hillier terminal moraines and hundreds of kettle lakes. In northwest Indiana there are various sand ridges and dunes, some reaching nearly 200 feet in height; most of them are at Indiana Dunes National Park. These are along the Lake Michigan shoreline and also inland to the Kankakee Outwash Plain.

Southern Indiana is characterized by valleys and rugged, hilly terrain, contrasting with much of the state. Here, bedrock is exposed at the surface. Because of the prevalent Indiana limestone, the area has many caves, caverns, and quarries. Harrison Spring, the largest spring in the state, is located in Harrison County.

=== Hydrology ===
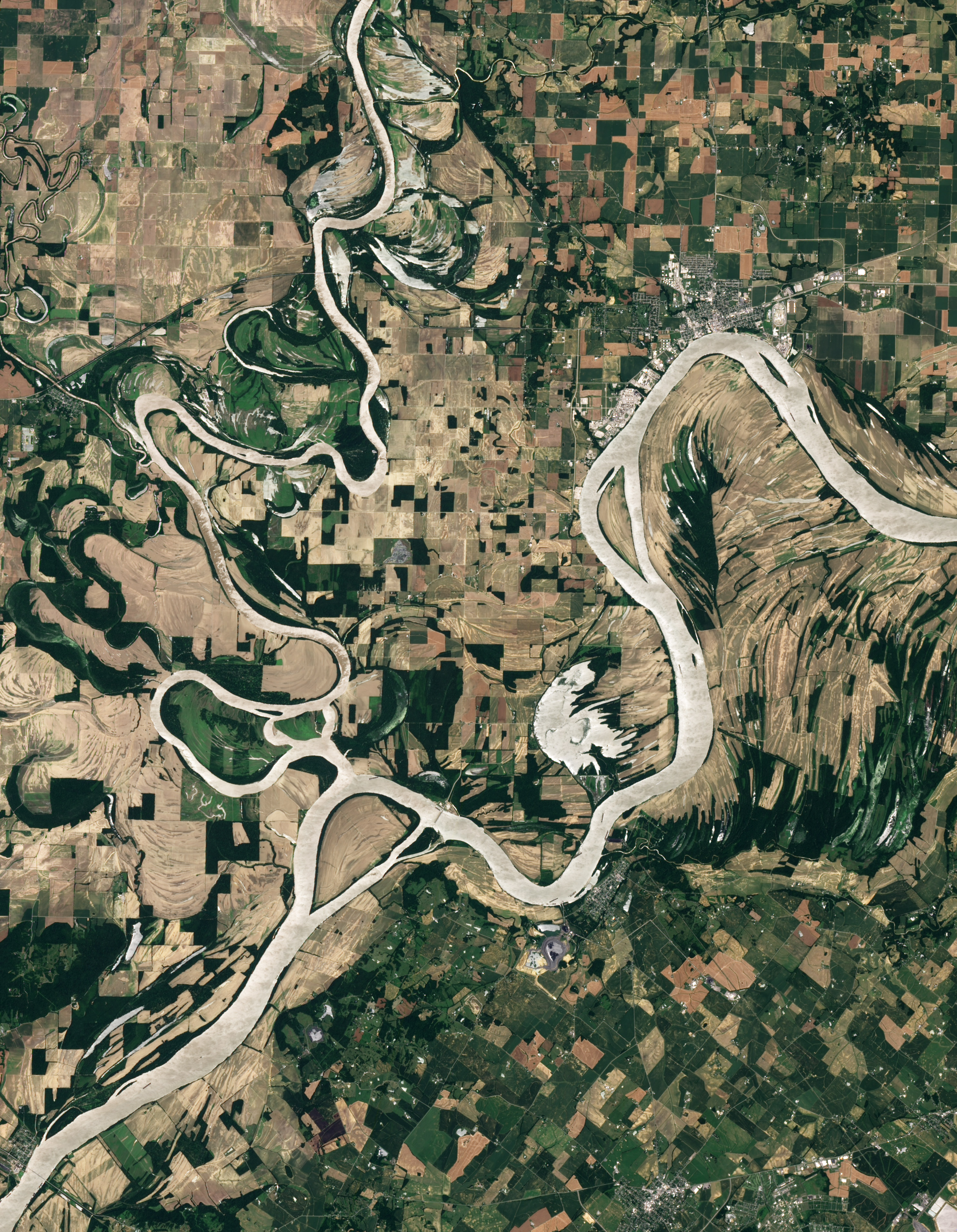
The Wabash River converges with the Ohio River at Posey County. The southernmost point in Indiana is located at Uniontown Bend 4.6 miles upstream of the confluence, south of Hovey Lake (near the center of the photograph)

Major river systems in Indiana include the Whitewater, White, Blue, Wabash, St. Joseph, and Maumee rivers. According to the Indiana Department of Natural Resources, as of 2007, there were 65 rivers, streams, and creeks of environmental interest or scenic beauty, which included only a portion of an estimated 24,000 total river miles within the state.

The Wabash River, which is the longest free-flowing river east of the Mississippi River, is the official river of Indiana. At 475 miles (764 kilometers) in length, the river bisects the state from northeast to southwest, forming part of the state's border with Illinois, before converging with the Ohio River. The river has been the subject of several songs, such as "On the Banks of the Wabash, Far Away", "Wabash Cannonball", and "Back Home Again in Indiana".

There are about 900 lakes listed by the Indiana Department of Natural Resources. To the northwest, Indiana borders Lake Michigan, one of five lakes comprising the Great Lakes, the largest group of freshwater lakes in the world. Tippecanoe Lake, the deepest lake in the state, reaches depths at nearly 120 feet (37 m), while Lake Wawasee is the largest natural lake in Indiana. At 10,750 acres (summer pool level), Monroe Lake is the largest lake in Indiana.

=== Climate ===
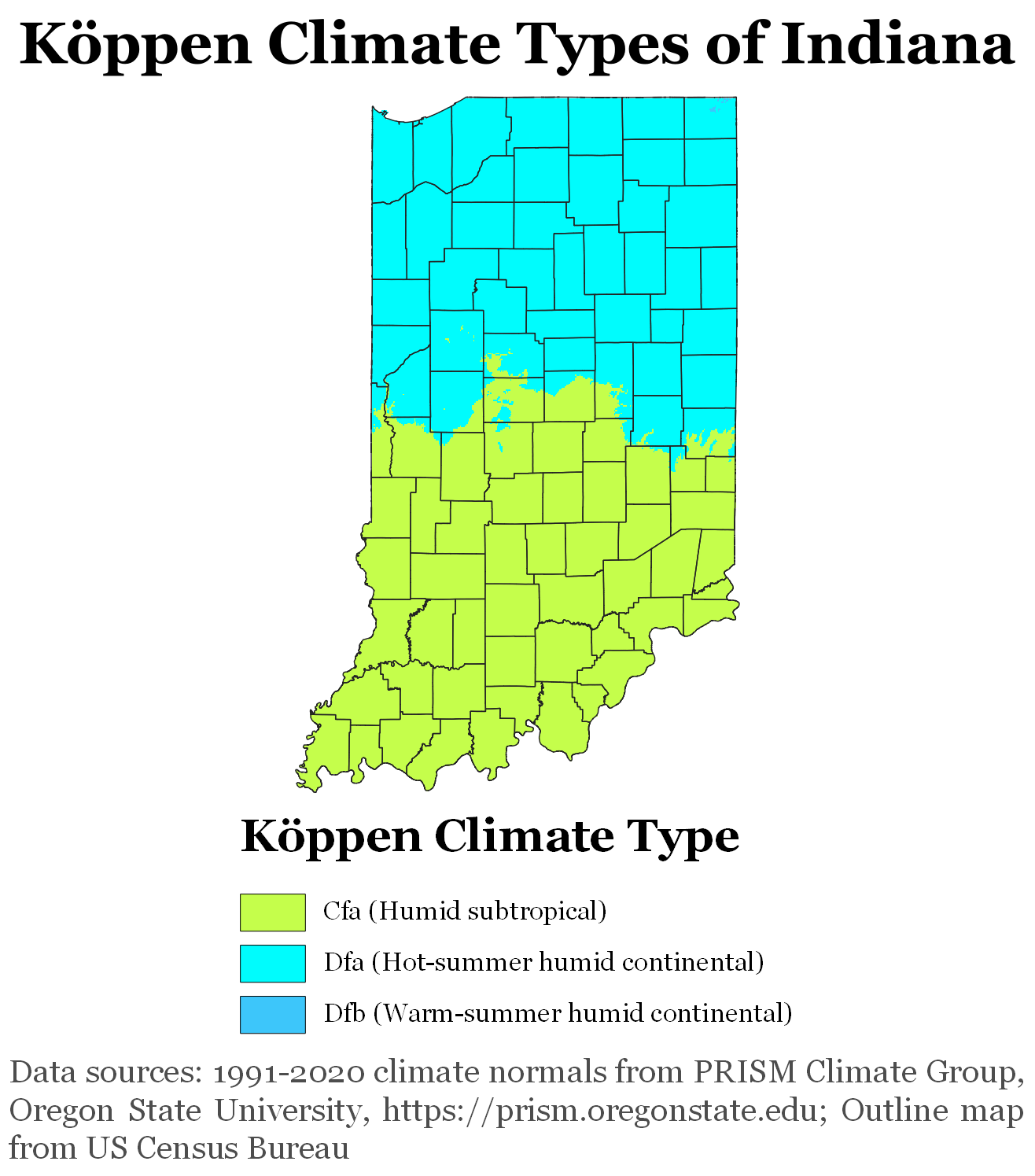
Köppen climate types of Indiana, using 1991–2020 climate normals

In the past, almost all of Indiana had a humid continental climate (Dfa), with cold winters and hot, wet summers; only the extreme southern portion of the state lay within the humid subtropical climate (Cfa), which receives more precipitation than other parts of Indiana. But as of the 2016 update, about half the state is now classified as humid subtropical. Temperatures generally diverge from the north and south sections of the state. In midwinter, average high/low temperatures range from around 30 °F/15 °F (−1 °C/−10 °C) in the far north to 41 °F/24 °F (5 °C/−4 °C) in the far south.

In midsummer there is generally a little less variation across the state, as average high/low temperatures range from around 84 °F/64 °F (29 °C/18 °C) in the far north to 90 °F/69 °F (32 °C/21 °C) in the far south. Indiana's record high temperature was 116 °F (47 °C) set on July 14, 1936, at Collegeville. The record low was −36 °F (−38 °C) on January 19, 1994 at New Whiteland. The growing season typically spans from 155 days in the north to 185 days in the south.

While droughts occasionally occur in the state, rainfall totals are distributed relatively equally throughout the year. Precipitation totals range from 35 inches (89 cm) near Lake Michigan in northwest Indiana to 45 inches (110 cm) along the Ohio River in the south, while the state's average is 40 inches (100 cm). Annual snowfall in Indiana varies widely across the state, ranging from 80 inches (200 cm) in the northwest along Lake Michigan to 14 inches (36 cm) in the far south. Lake effect snow accounts for roughly half the snowfall in northwest and north central Indiana due to the effects of the moisture and relative warmth of Lake Michigan upwind. The average wind speed ranges from 6.5 miles per hour (10.5 km/h) to 12.7 miles per hour (20.4 km/h).

In a 2012 report, Indiana was ranked eighth in a list of the top 20 tornado-prone states based on National Weather Service data from 1950 through 2011. A 2011 report ranked South Bend 15th among the top 20 tornado-prone U.S. cities, while another report from 2011 ranked Indianapolis eighth. (Note: In a 2008 report, Indiana was listed as one of the most tornado-prone states, ranking sixth, while South Bend was ranked the 14th most tornado-prone U.S. city, ahead of cities such as Houston, Texas, and Wichita, Kansas. See Mecklenburg, Rick (May 1, 2008). "Is Indiana the new Tornado Alley?". SouthBendTribune.com. Archived from the original on January 17, 2013.) (Note: In a published list of the most tornado-prone states and cities in April 2008, Indiana came in first and South Bend ranked 16th. See Henderson, Mark (May 2, 2008). "Top 20 Tornado Prone Cities and States Announced". WIFR. Archived from the original on November 9, 2008.)Despite its vulnerability, Indiana is not part of Tornado Alley.

Average precipitation in Indiana
Jan	Feb	Mar	Apr	May	Jun	Jul	Aug	Sep	Oct	Nov	Dec	Annum
2.48	2.27	3.36	3.89	4.46	4.19	4.22	3.91	3.12	3.02	3.44	3.13	41.49

Average daily maximum and minimum temperatures for selected cities in Indiana
Location	July (°F)	July (°C)	January (°F)	January (°C)
Indianapolis	85/66	29/19	35/20	2/−6
Fort Wayne	84/62	29/17	32/17	0/−8
Evansville	88/67	31/19	41/24	5/−4
South Bend	83/63	28/17	32/18	0/−8
Bloomington	87/65	30/18	39/21	4/−6
Lafayette	84/62	29/17	31/14	0/−10
Muncie	85/64	29/18	34/19	1/−7

=== Time zones ===
Indiana is one of 13 U.S. states that are divided into more than one time zone. Indiana's time zones have fluctuated over the past century. At present, most of the state observes Eastern Time; six counties near Chicago and six near Evansville observe Central Time. Debate continues on the matter.

Before 2006, most of Indiana did not observe daylight saving time (DST). Some counties within this area, particularly Floyd, Clark, and Harrison counties near Louisville, Kentucky, and Ohio and Dearborn counties near Cincinnati, Ohio, unofficially observed DST by local custom. Since April 2006 the entire state observes DST.

=== Indiana counties and statistical areas ===
Indiana is divided into 92 counties. As of 2010, the state includes 16 metropolitan and 25 micropolitan statistical areas, 117 incorporated cities, 450 towns, and several other smaller divisions and statistical areas. (Note: A 2008 news report indicated there were 13 metropolitan areas in Indiana. See Dresang, Joel (July 30, 2008). "Automaking down, unemployment up". Milwaukee Journal Sentinel.) Marion County and Indianapolis have a consolidated city-county government known as Unigov in Indiana state law.

==== Major cities ====
Indianapolis is the capital of Indiana and its largest city. (Note: Indiana's territorial capitals were Vincennes and later Corydon, which also became Indiana's first state capital when it became a state.) Indiana's four largest metropolitan areas are Indianapolis, Fort Wayne, Evansville, and South Bend. The table below lists the state's twenty largest municipalities based on the 2020 United States census.

Largest cities or towns in Indiana Source: 2020 United States census
Rank	Name	County	Pop.	Rank	Name	County	Pop.
1	Indianapolis	Marion	887,642	11	Gary	Lake	69,093
2	Fort Wayne	Allen	263,886	12	Muncie	Delaware	65,194
3	Evansville	Vanderburgh	117,298	13	Greenwood	Johnson	63,830
4	South Bend	St. Joseph	103,453	14	Kokomo	Howard	59,604
5	Carmel	Hamilton	99,757	15	Terre Haute	Vigo	58,389
6	Fishers	Hamilton	98,977	16	Anderson	Madison	54,788
7	Bloomington	Monroe	79,168	17	Elkhart	Elkhart	53,923
8	Hammond	Lake	77,879	18	Mishawaka	St. Joseph	51,063
9	Lafayette	Tippecanoe	70,783	19	Columbus	Bartholomew	50,474
10	Noblesville	Hamilton	69,604	20	Jeffersonville	Clark	49,447

== Demographics ==
=== Population ===
Historical population
Census	Pop.	Note	%±
1800	2,632		—
1810	24,520		831.6%
1820	147,178		500.2%
1830	343,031		133.1%
1840	685,866		99.9%
1850	988,416		44.1%
1860	1,350,428		36.6%
1870	1,680,637		24.5%
1880	1,978,301		17.7%
1890	2,192,404		10.8%
1900	2,516,462		14.8%
1910	2,700,876		7.3%
1920	2,930,390		8.5%
1930	3,238,503		10.5%
1940	3,427,796		5.8%
1950	3,934,224		14.8%
1960	4,662,498		18.5%
1970	5,193,669		11.4%
1980	5,490,224		5.7%
1990	5,544,159		1.0%
2000	6,080,485		9.7%
2010	6,483,802		6.6%
2020	6,785,528		4.7%
2025 (est.)	6,973,333		2.8%
Source: 1910–2020

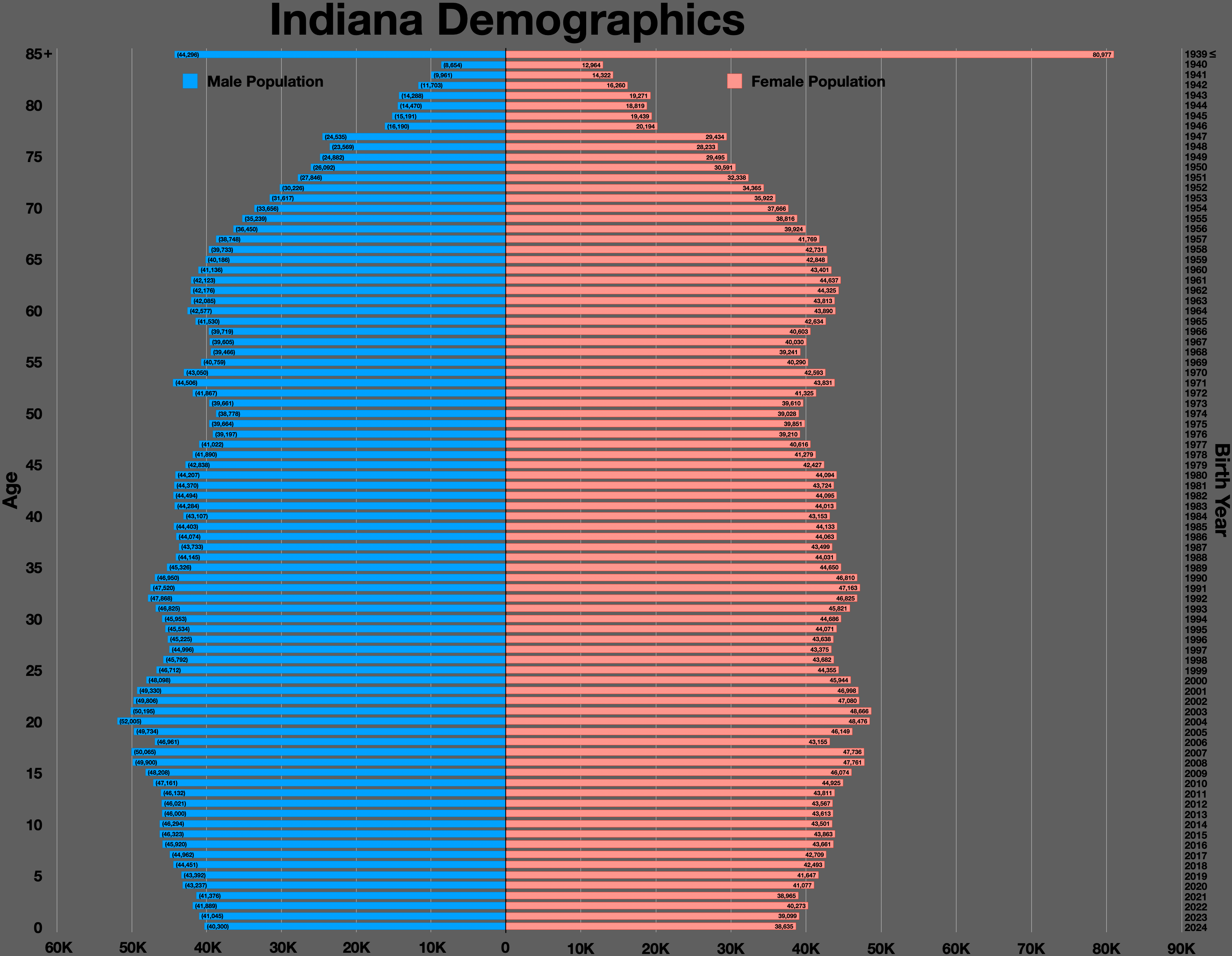
Indiana population pyramid

Indiana recorded a population of 6,785,528 in the 2020 United States census, a 4.65% increase since the 2010 United States census.

The state's population density was 70/km^{2} or 181/mi^{2}, the 16th-highest in the United States. As of the 2010 U.S. census, Indiana's population center was northwest of Sheridan, in Hamilton County (+40.149246, −086.259514). (Note: Over the previous decade, Indiana's population center has shifted slightly to the northwest. In the 2000 U.S. Census, Indiana's center of population was located in Hamilton County, in the town of Sheridan. See "Population and Population Centers by State". United States Census Bureau. Archived from the original on May 8, 2013.)

In 2005, 77.7% of Indiana residents lived in metropolitan counties, 16.5% lived in micropolitan counties and 5.9% lived in non-core counties.

According to HUD's 2022 Annual Homeless Assessment Report, there were an estimated 5,449 homeless people in Indiana.

In 2018, the top countries of origin for Indiana's immigrants were Mexico, India, China, Myanmar, and the Philippines. The city of Fort Wayne in particular is home to one of the largest communities of Burmese immigrants in the country.

=== Race and ethnicity ===
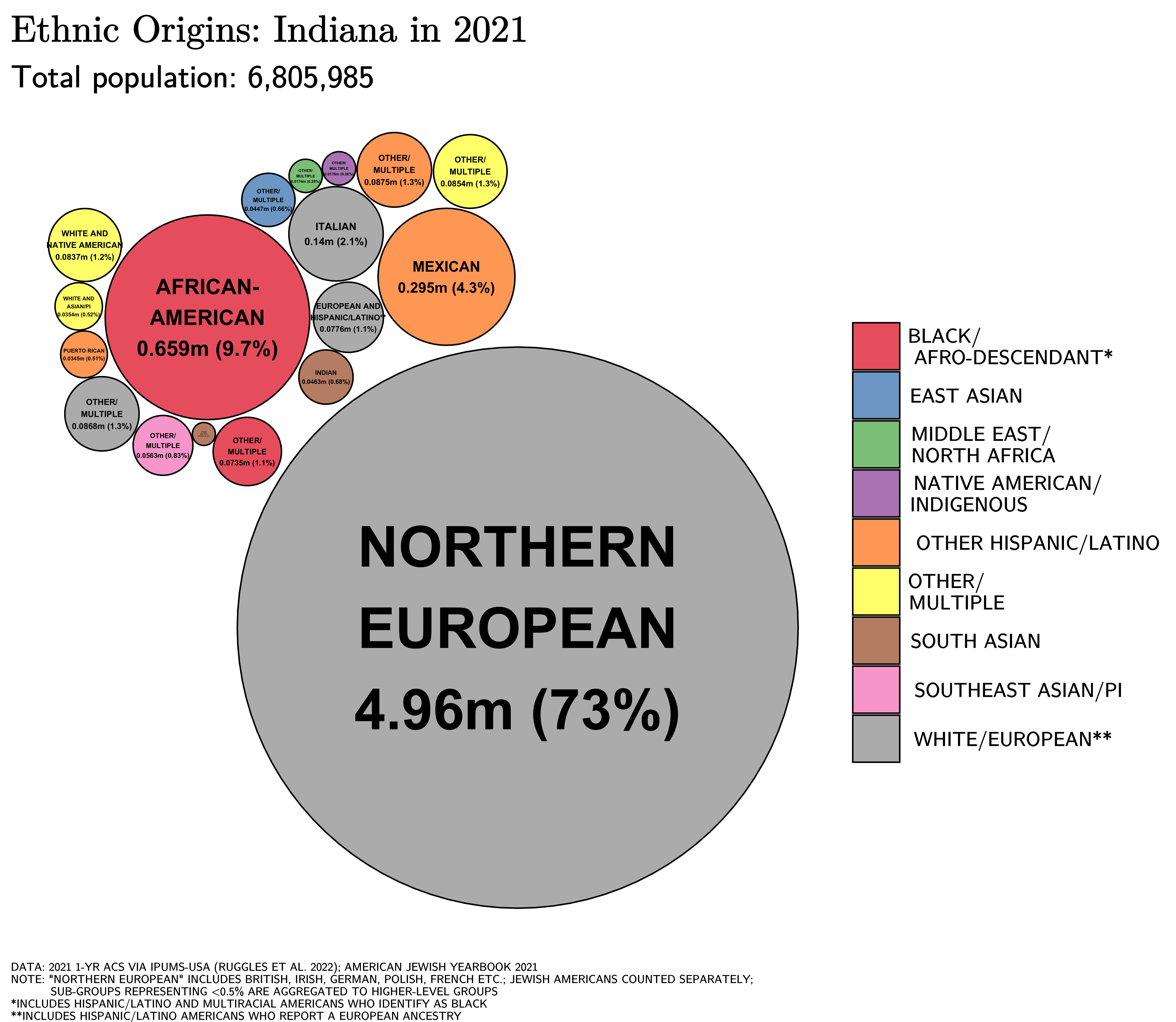
Ethnic origins in Indiana

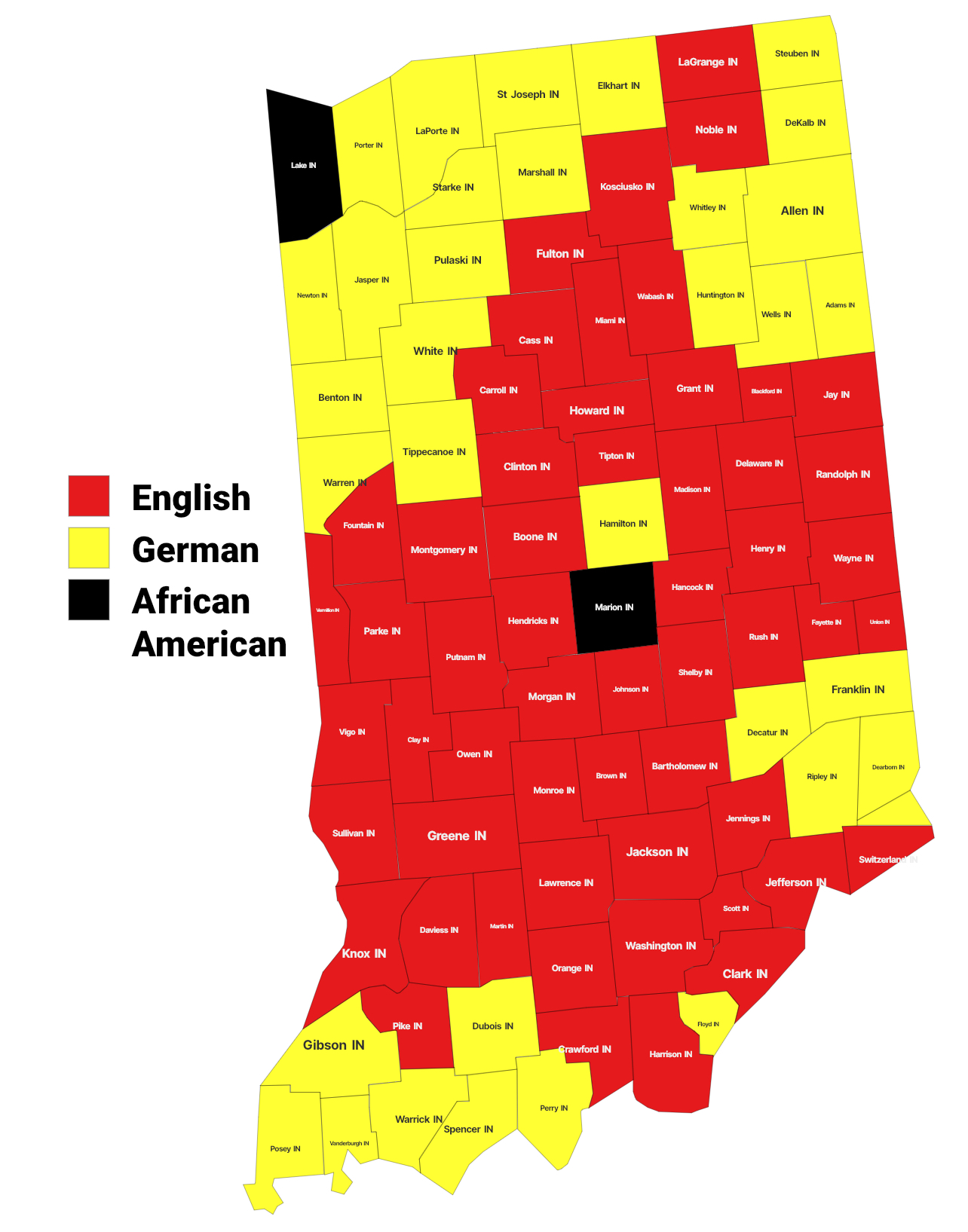
Largest alone or in any combination ethnic origin by county in Indiana, per the 2020 census

Ethnic composition as of the 2020 census
Race and ethnicity	Alone	Total
White (non-Hispanic)	75.5%	79.1%
African American (non-Hispanic)	9.4%	10.8%
Hispanic or Latino (Note: Persons of Hispanic or Latino origin are not distinguished between total and partial ancestry.)	—	8.2%
Asian	2.5%	3.1%
Native American	0.2%	1.6%
Pacific Islander	0.04%	0.2%
Other	0.4%	1.1%

Indiana – Racial and ethnic composition Note: the US Census treats Hispanic/Latino as an ethnic category. This table excludes Latinos from the racial categories and assigns them to a separate category. Hispanics/Latinos may be of any race.
Race / Ethnicity (NH = Non-Hispanic)	Pop 2000	Pop 2010	Pop 2020	% 2000	% 2010	% 2020
White alone (NH)	5,219,373	5,286,453	5,121,004	85.84%	81.53%	75.47%
Black or African American alone (NH)	505,462	582,140	637,500	8.31%	8.98%	9.40%
Native American or Alaska Native alone (NH)	13,654	14,165	12,938	0.22%	0.22%	0.19%
Asian alone (NH)	58,424	101,444	166,651	0.96%	1.56%	2.46%
Pacific Islander alone (NH)	1,573	1,853	2,761	0.03%	0.03%	0.04%
Other race alone (NH)	6,348	8,675	25,139	0.10%	0.13%	0.37%
Mixed race or Multiracial (NH)	61,115	99,365	265,344	1.01%	1.53%	3.91%
Hispanic or Latino (any race)	214,536	389,707	554,191	3.53%	6.01%	8.17%
Total	6,080,485	6,483,802	6,785,528	100.00%	100.00%	100.00%

Indiana racial breakdown of population
Racial composition	1990	2000	2010	2020
White	90.6%	87.5%	84.3%	77.2%
Black	7.8%	8.4%	9.1%	9.6%
Asian	0.7%	1.0%	1.6%	2.5%
Native	0.2%	0.3%	0.3%	0.4%
Native Hawaiian and other Pacific Islander	–	–	–	–
Other race	0.7%	1.6%	2.7%	3.9%
Two or more races	–	1.2%	2.0%	6.4%

==== 2025 American Community Survey one-year estimates ====
Racial Makeup of Indiana (2025): 1. White alone (74.7%); 2. Black alone (9.65%); 3. Native American alone (0.49%); 4. Asian Alone (3.02%); 5. Pacific Islander Alone (0.05%); 6. Other race alone (3.58%); 7. Two or more races (8.51%)	Racial/Ethnic Makeup of Indiana excluding Hispanics from racial categories (2025); NH=Non-Hispanic: 1. White NH (72.7%); 2. Black NH (9.50%); 3. Native American NH (0.16%); 4. Asian NH (2.99%); 5. Pacific Islander NH (0.04%); 6. Other race NH (0.43%); 7. Two or more races NH (4.69%); 8. Hispanic Any Race (9.50%)	Racial Makeup of Hispanics in Indiana (2025): 1. White alone (21.1%); 2. Black alone (1.58%); 3. Native American alone (3.54%); 4. Asian Alone (0.36%); 5. Pacific Islander Alone (0.10%); 6. Other race alone (33.2%); 7. Two or more races (40.1%)

=== Ancestry ===
German is the largest ancestry reported in Indiana, with 18.8% of the population reporting that ancestry in the census. Persons listing themselves as American (7.2%) and those of English ancestry (11.1%) are also numerous, as are Irish (9.8%) and Polish (2.6%). Most of those citing American ancestry are actually of European descent, including many of English descent, but have family that has been in North America for so long, in many cases since the early colonial era, that they identify simply as American. In the 1980 census 1,776,144 people claimed German ancestry, 1,356,135 claimed English ancestry and 1,017,944 claimed Irish ancestry out of a total population of 4,241,975 making the state 42% German, 32% English and 24% Irish.

The state is home to a growing Hispanic population, making up 7.8% of the total population. The largest Hispanic ancestry in the state is Mexican (5.3%), making up a large majority of the Hispanic population.

In the 2020 Census, 648,513 Indiana residents were identified as African American (of the total 6,785,528). In five of the state's 92 counties, African Americans make up more than 10% of the population: Marion (27.5%), Lake (24.9%), St. Joseph (13.2%), Allen (11.5%), and LaPorte (10.8%). African Americans in the seven counties of Marion (268,694), Lake (124,073), Allen (44,481), St. Joseph (36,123), Vanderburgh (17,668), Hamilton (14,993), and Hendricks (13,521) make up more than 80% of all African Americans in the state.

=== Population growth ===
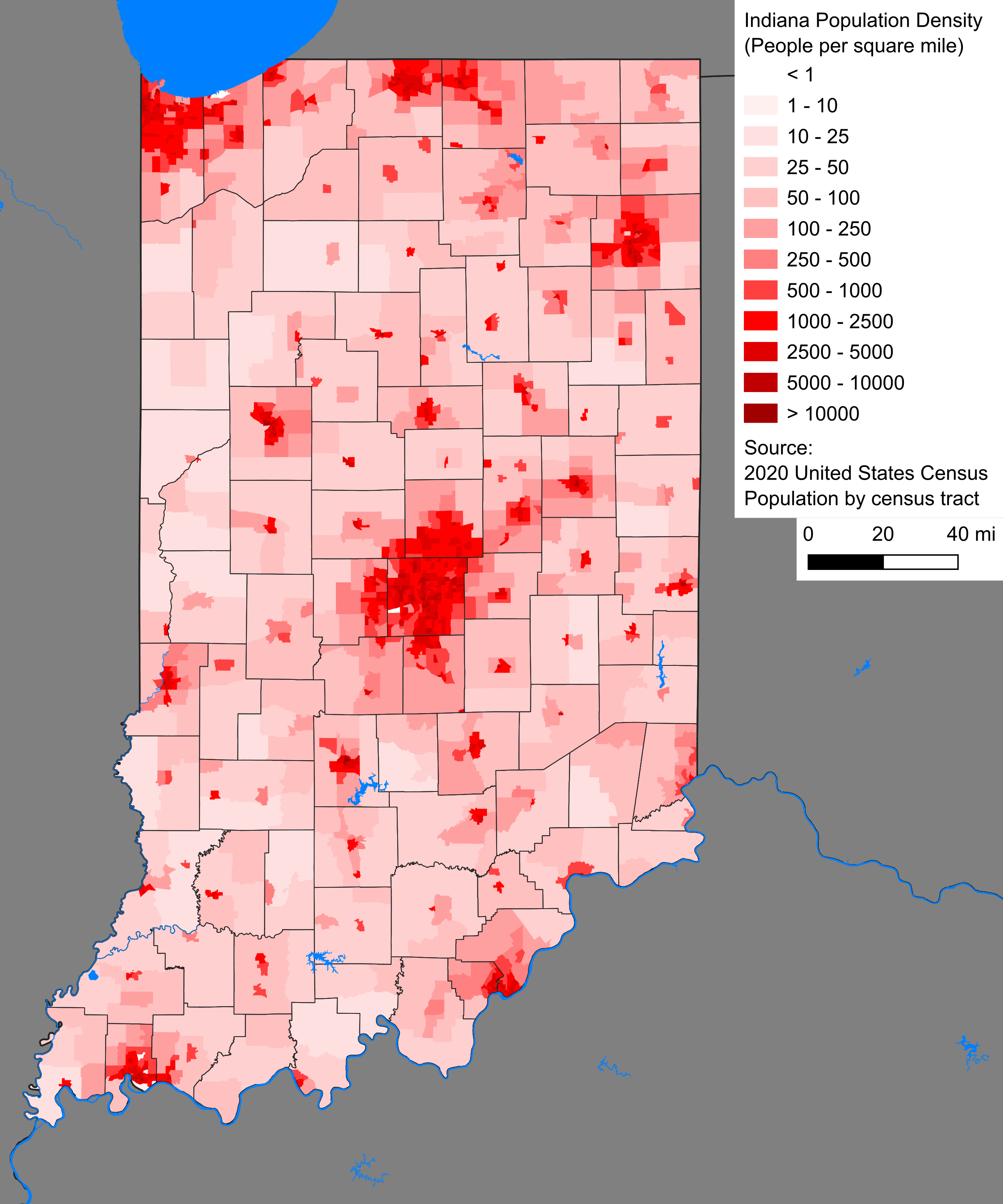
Population density in Indiana as of the 2020 U.S. census

Map of counties in Indiana by racial plurality, per the 2020 U.S. census Non-Hispanic White 50–60% 60–70% 70–80% 80–90% 90%+

Population growth since 1990 has been concentrated in the counties surrounding Indianapolis, with four of the five fastest-growing counties in that area: Hamilton, Hendricks, Johnson, and Hancock. The other county is Dearborn County, which is near Cincinnati, Ohio. Hamilton County has also grown faster than any county in the states bordering Indiana (Illinois, Michigan, Ohio and Kentucky), and is the 20th-fastest growing county in the country.

With a population of 887,642, Indianapolis is the largest city in Indiana and the 15th-largest in the United States, according to the 2020 census. Three other cities in Indiana have a population greater than 100,000: Fort Wayne (253,617), Evansville (117,429) and South Bend (101,168). Since 2000, Fishers has seen the largest population rise amongst the state's twenty largest cities with an increase of 100%. Other cities that have seen extensive growth since 2000 are Greenwood (81%), Noblesville (39.4%), Carmel (21.4%), Columbus (12.8%) and Lawrence (9.3%).

Gary and Hammond have had the largest population declines regarding the 20 largest cities since 2000, with a decrease of 21.0% and 6.8% respectively. Evansville (−4.2%), Anderson (−4.0%) and Muncie (−3.9%) have also had declines.

Indianapolis has the largest population of the state's metropolitan areas and the 33rd-largest in the country. The Indianapolis metropolitan area encompasses Marion County and nine surrounding counties in central Indiana.

Note: Births in table don't add up, because Hispanics are counted both by their ethnicity and by their race, giving a higher overall number.

Live births by single race/ethnicity of mother
Race	2014	2015	2016	2017	2018	2019	2020	2021	2022	2023	2024
White	64,076 (76.2%)	63,472 (75.5%)	62,039 (74.7%)	60,515 (73.6%)	59,520 (72.9%)	58,211 (72.0%)	56,290 (71.6%)	56,839 (71.1%)	55,178 (69.3%)	53,866 (68.2%)	53,994 (67.3%)
Black	10,666 (12.7%)	10,656 (12.7%)	9,768 (11.8%)	9,971 (12.1%)	10,242 (12.5%)	10,249 (12.7%)	9,848 (12.5%)	9,991 (12.5%)	10,119 (12.7%)	10,035 (12.7%)	10,082 (12.6%)
Asian	2,322 (2.8%)	2,523 (3.0%)	2,426 (2.9%)	2,535 (3.1%)	2,382 (2.9%)	2,285 (2.8%)	2,335 (3.0%)	2,295 (2.9%)	2,458 (3.1%)	2,433 (3.1%)	2,659 (3.3%)
American Indian	125 (0.1%)	120 (0.1%)	85 (0.1%)	124 (0.2%)	132 (0.2%)	117 (0.1%)	56 (>0.1%)	76 (>0.1%)	50 (>0.1%)	68 (>0.1%)	61 (>0.1%)
Hispanic (any race)	7,239 (8.6%)	7,634 (9.1%)	7,442 (8.9%)	7,669 (9.3%)	7,867 (9.6%)	8,420 (10.4%)	8,480 (10.8%)	8,826 (11.0%)	9,939 (12.5%)	10,586 (13.4%)	11,438 (14.2%)
Total	84,080 (100%)	84,040 (100%)	83,091 (100%)	82,170 (100%)	81,646 (100%)	80,859 (100%)	78,616 (100%)	79,946 (100%)	79,649 (100%)	79,000 (100%)	80,257 (100%)

- Since 2016, data for births of White Hispanic origin are not collected, but included in one Hispanic group; persons of Hispanic origin may be of any race.

Based on population estimates for 2011, 6.6% of the state's population is under the age of five, 24.5% is under the age of 18, and 13.2% is 65 years of age or older. From the 2010 U.S. census demographic data for Indiana, the median age is 37.

=== Median income ===
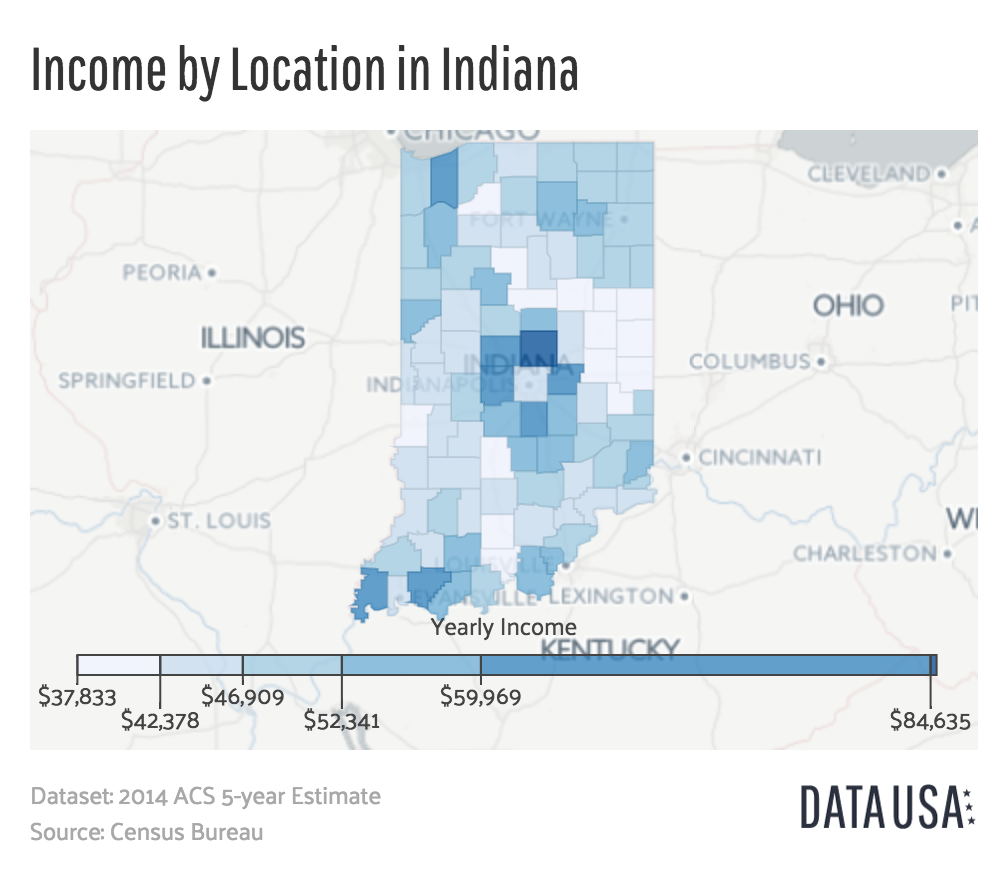

As of the 2010 census, Indiana's median household income was $44,616, ranking it 36th among the United States and the District of Columbia. In 2005, the median household income for Indiana residents was $43,993. Nearly 498,700 Indiana households had incomes between $50,000 and $75,000, accounting for 20% of all households.

Hamilton County's median household income is nearly $35,000 higher than the Indiana average. At $78,932, it ranks seventh in the country among counties with fewer than 250,000 people. The next highest median incomes in Indiana are also found in the Indianapolis suburbs; Hendricks County has a median of $57,538, followed by Johnson County at $56,251.

=== Religion ===
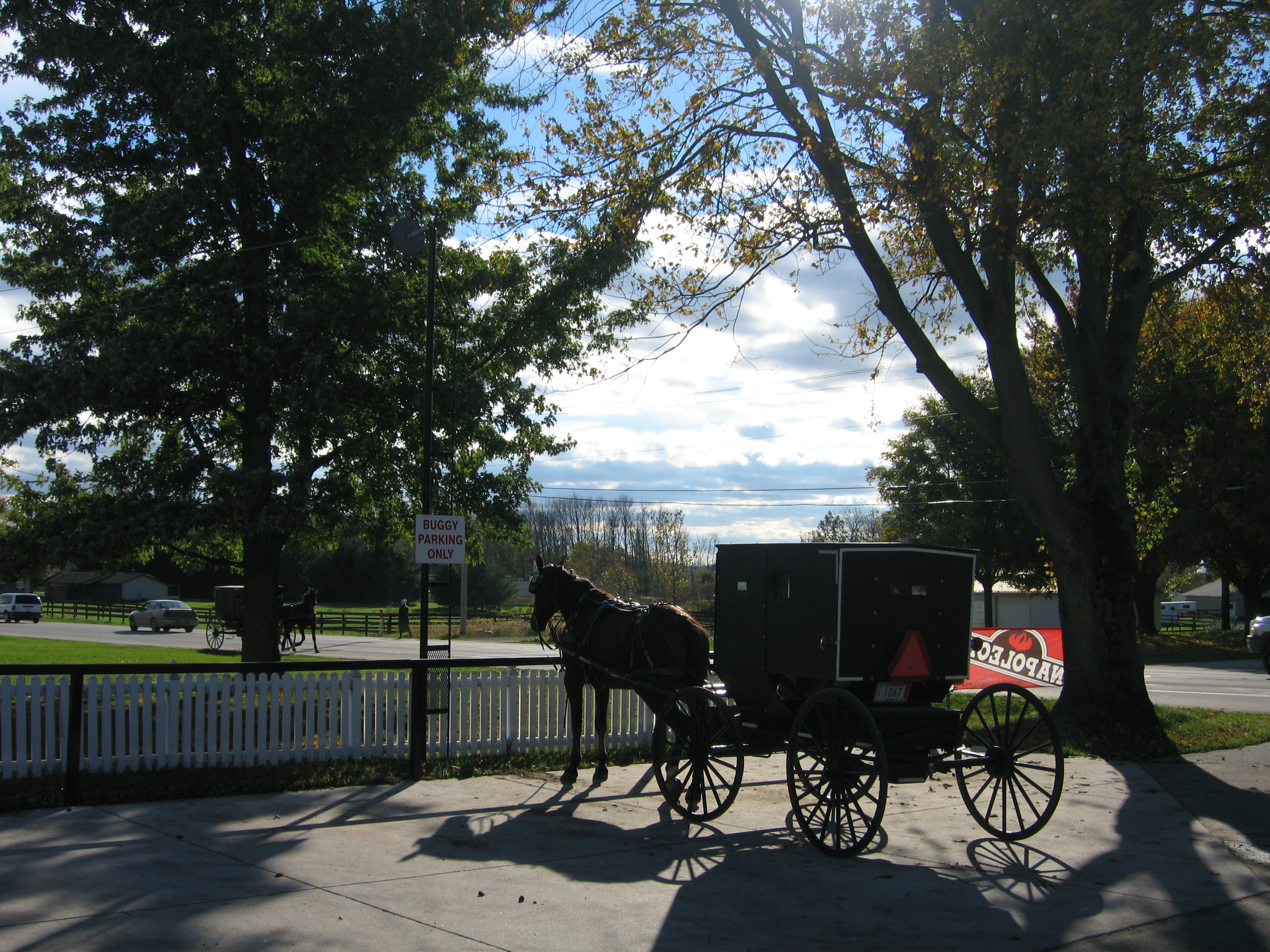
Indiana is home to the third largest population of Amish in the U.S.

Although the largest single religious denomination in the state is Catholic (747,706 members), most Hoosiers are members of various Protestant denominations. The largest Protestant denomination by number of adherents in 2010 was the United Methodist Church, with 355,043. A study by the Graduate Center at the City University of New York found 20% are Catholic, 14% belong to Baptist churches, 10% are other Christians, 9% are Methodist, and 6% are Lutheran. About 1% are Old Order Amish, the highest percentage of all US states.

The study found 16% are affiliated with no religion.

Indiana is home to the Benedictine St. Meinrad Archabbey, one of two Catholic archabbeys in the United States and 11 in the world. The Lutheran Church–Missouri Synod has one of its two seminaries in Fort Wayne. Two evangelical Methodist denominations, the Free Methodist Church and the Wesleyan Church, are headquartered in Indianapolis, as is the Christian Church (Disciples of Christ).

The Fellowship of Grace Brethren Churches maintains offices and publishing work in Winona Lake. Huntington serves as the home to the Church of the United Brethren in Christ. Anderson is home to the headquarters of the Church of God. The headquarters of the Missionary Church is in Fort Wayne.

The Friends United Meeting of the Religious Society of Friends, the largest branch of American Quakerism, is based in Richmond, which also houses the oldest Quaker seminary in the United States, the Earlham School of Religion. The Islamic Society of North America is headquartered in Plainfield.

Religious affiliation in Indiana (2023–2024)
Affiliation	% of Indiana population
Christianity	65
Protestant	43
Evangelical Protestant	32
Mainline Protestant	11
Black Protestant	3
Catholic	16
Mormon	1
Jehovah's Witnesses	1
Orthodox	<1
Other Christianity	<1
Islam	1
Buddhism	1
Judaism	<1
Hinduism	<1
Other faiths	2
Unaffiliated	31

=== Vital statistics ===
Year	Population	Live births	Deaths	Natural change	Crude birth rate (per 1,000)	Crude death rate (per 1,000)	Natural change (per 1,000)	Crude migration change (per 1,000)
2000	6,091,866	87,699	55,469	32,230	14.4	9.1	5.3	
2001	6,127,760	86,459	55,198	31,261	14.1	9.0	5.1	0.8
2002	6,155,967	85,081	55,396	29,685	13.8	9.0	4.8	-0.2
2003	6,196,638	86,434	55,968	30,466	13.9	9.0	4.9	1.6
2004	6,233,007	87,142	54,211	32,931	14.0	8.7	5.3	0.6
2005	6,278,616	87,193	55,675	31,518	13.9	8.9	5.0	2.2
2006	6,332,669	88,631	55,622	33,009	14.0	8.8	5.2	3.3
2007	6,379,599	89,864	54,000	35,864	14.1	8.5	5.6	1.7
2008	6,424,806	88,742	56,752	31,990	13.8	8.8	5.0	2.1
2009	6,459,325	86,673	55,973	30,700	13.4	8.7	4.7	0.6
2010	6,491,385	83,940	56,743	27,197	12.9	8.7	4.2	0.7
2011	6,521,409	83,701	58,202	25,499	12.8	8.9	3.9	0.7
2012	6,546,485	83,227	59,332	23,895	12.7	9.1	3.6	0.2
2013	6,581,401	83,102	60,716	22,386	12.6	9.2	3.4	1.9
2014	6,610,174	84,080	60,940	23,140	12.7	9.2	3.5	0.9
2015	6,628,925	84,040	62,713	21,327	12.7	9.5	3.2	-0.4
2016	6,658,719	83,091	63,473	19,618	12.5	9.5	3.0	1.5
2017	6,686,218	82,170	65,597	16,573	12.3	9.8	2.5	1.6
2018	6,725,960	81,646	65,693	15,953	12.1	9.8	2.3	3.5
2019	6,761,818	80,859	66,001	14,858	12.0	9.8	2.2	3.1
2020	6,790,290	78,616	78,194	422	11.6	11.5	0.1	4.1
2021	6,814,223	79,946	78,317	1,629	11.7	11.5	0.2	3.3
2022	6,841,491	79,649	75,368	4,281	11.6	11.0	0.6	3.4
2023	6,881,373	79,000	69,942	9,058	11.5	10.2	1.3	4.5
2024	6,934,754	80,257	69,509	10,748	11.6	10.0	1.6	6.1
2025	6,973,333	79,764	70,600	9,164	11.4	10.1	1.3	4.2

== Law and government ==
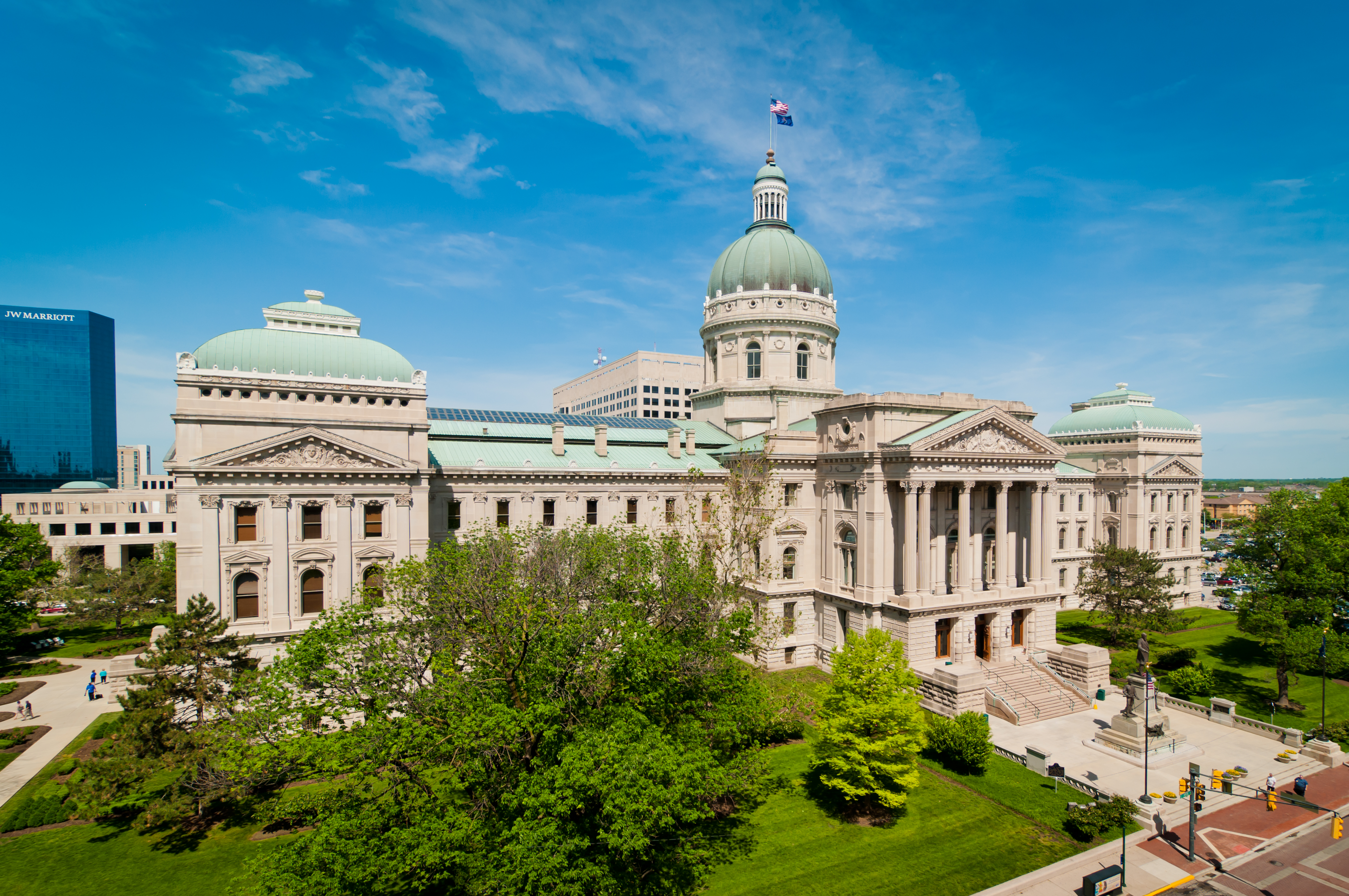
The Indiana Statehouse in Indianapolis, seat of Indiana's state government, hosts the Indiana General Assembly, the Indiana Supreme Court, and the Governor of Indiana.

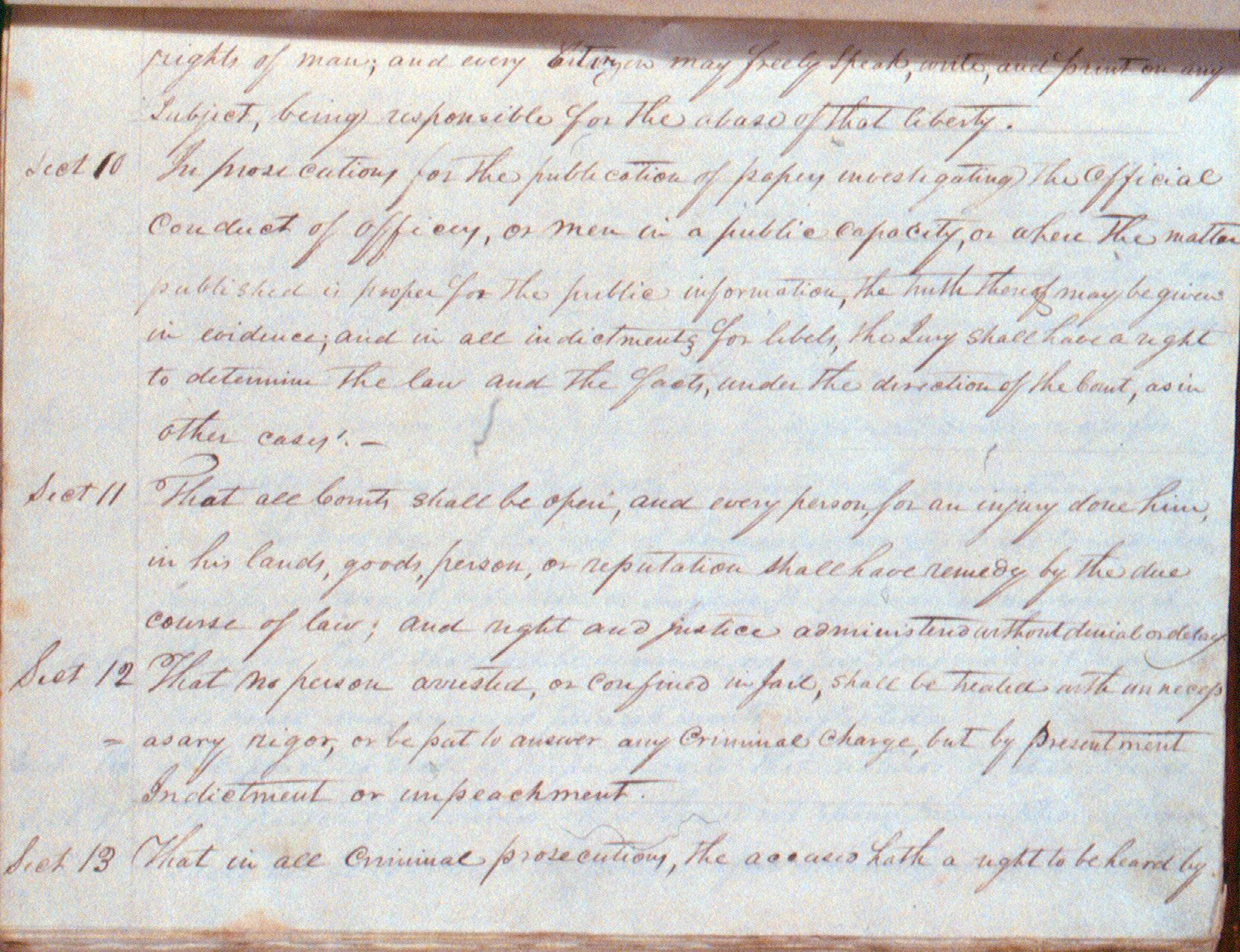
Constitution of Indiana (1816)

Indiana has a constitutional democratic republican form of government with three branches: the executive, including an elected governor and lieutenant governor; the legislative, consisting of an elected bicameral General Assembly; and the judicial, the Supreme Court of Indiana, the Indiana Court of Appeals and circuit courts.

The Governor of Indiana serves as the state's chief executive and has the authority to manage the government as established in the Constitution of Indiana. The governor and the lieutenant governor are jointly elected to four-year terms, with gubernatorial elections running concurrently with United States presidential elections (1996, 2000, 2004, 2008, etc.). The governor may not serve more than two consecutive terms. The governor works with the Indiana General Assembly and the Indiana Supreme Court to govern the state and has the authority to adjust the other branches. The governor can call special sessions of the General Assembly and select and remove leaders of nearly all state departments, boards and commissions. Other notable powers include calling out the Indiana Guard Reserve or the Indiana National Guard in times of emergency or disaster, issuing pardons or commuting the sentence of any criminal offenders except in cases of treason or impeachment and possessing an abundant amount of statutory authority.

The lieutenant governor serves as the President of the Senate and ensures the senate rules are acted in accordance with by its constituents. The lieutenant governor votes only when needed to break ties. If the governor dies in office, becomes permanently incapacitated, resigns or is impeached, the lieutenant governor becomes governor. If both the governor and lieutenant governor positions are unoccupied, the Senate President pro tempore becomes governor.

The Indiana General Assembly is composed of a 50-member Senate and 100-member House of Representatives. The Senate is the upper house of the General Assembly and the House of Representatives is the lower house. The General Assembly has exclusive legislative authority within the state government. Both the Senate and the House can introduce legislation, with the exception that the Senate is not authorized to initiate legislation that will affect revenue. Bills are debated and passed separately in each house, but both houses must pass them before they can be submitted to the Governor. The legislature can nullify a veto from the governor with a majority vote of full membership in the Senate and House of Representatives. Each law passed by the General Assembly must apply without exception to the entire state. The General Assembly has no authority to create legislation that targets a particular community. The General Assembly can manage the state's judiciary system by arranging the size of the courts and the bounds of their districts. It also can oversee the activities of the executive branch of the state government, has restricted power to regulate the county governments within the state, and has exclusive power to initiate the method to alter the Indiana Constitution.

The Indiana Supreme Court is made up of five judges with a Court of Appeals composed of 15 judges. The governor selects judges for the supreme and appeals courts from a group of applicants chosen by a special commission. After serving for two years, the judges must acquire the support of the electorate to serve for a 10-year term. In nearly all cases, the Supreme Court does not have original jurisdiction and can hear only cases petitioned to it after being heard in lower courts. Local circuit courts are where most cases begin with a trial and the consequence is decided by the jury. The Supreme Court has original and sole jurisdiction in certain areas including the practice of law, discipline or disbarment of Judges appointed to the lower state courts, and supervision over the exercise of jurisdiction by the other lower courts of the State.

The state is divided into 92 counties, which are led by a board of county commissioners. 90 counties in Indiana have their own circuit court with a judge elected for a six-year term. The remaining two counties, Dearborn and Ohio, are combined into one circuit. Many counties operate superior courts in addition to the circuit court. In densely populated counties where the caseload is traditionally greater, separate courts have been established to solely hear either juvenile, criminal, probate or small claims cases. The establishment, frequency and jurisdiction of these additional courts vary greatly from county to county. There are 85 city and town courts in Indiana municipalities, created by local ordinance, typically handling minor offenses and not considered courts of record. County officials elected to four-year terms include an auditor, recorder, treasurer, sheriff, coroner and clerk of the circuit court. All incorporated cities in Indiana have a mayor and council form of municipal government. Towns are governed by a town council and townships are governed by a township trustee and advisory board.

U.S. News & World Report ranked Indiana first in the publication's inaugural 2017 Best States for Government listing. Among individual categories, Indiana ranked above average in budget transparency (#1), government digitization (#6), and fiscal stability (#8), and ranked average in state integrity (#25).

In a 2020 study, Indiana was ranked as the 10th hardest state for citizens to vote in. Abortion is illegal in Indiana with limited exceptions.

In 2015, Indiana expanded Medicaid eligibility from ACA provisions. A study from Kaiser Family Foundation found that the uninsured rate in Indiana dropped from 14% in 2014 to 8.5% in 2015 after the expansion. Under Obamacare, when a state adopts Medicaid expansion, the eligibility income requirement goes from 100% of the federal poverty line to 138% of the federal poverty rate. However, Indiana requires enrollees to contribute to a "POWER account" which functions as a health savings account for all beneficiaries. This has been controversial because beneficiaries would have to pay into an account with money they would not have.

=== Military installations ===
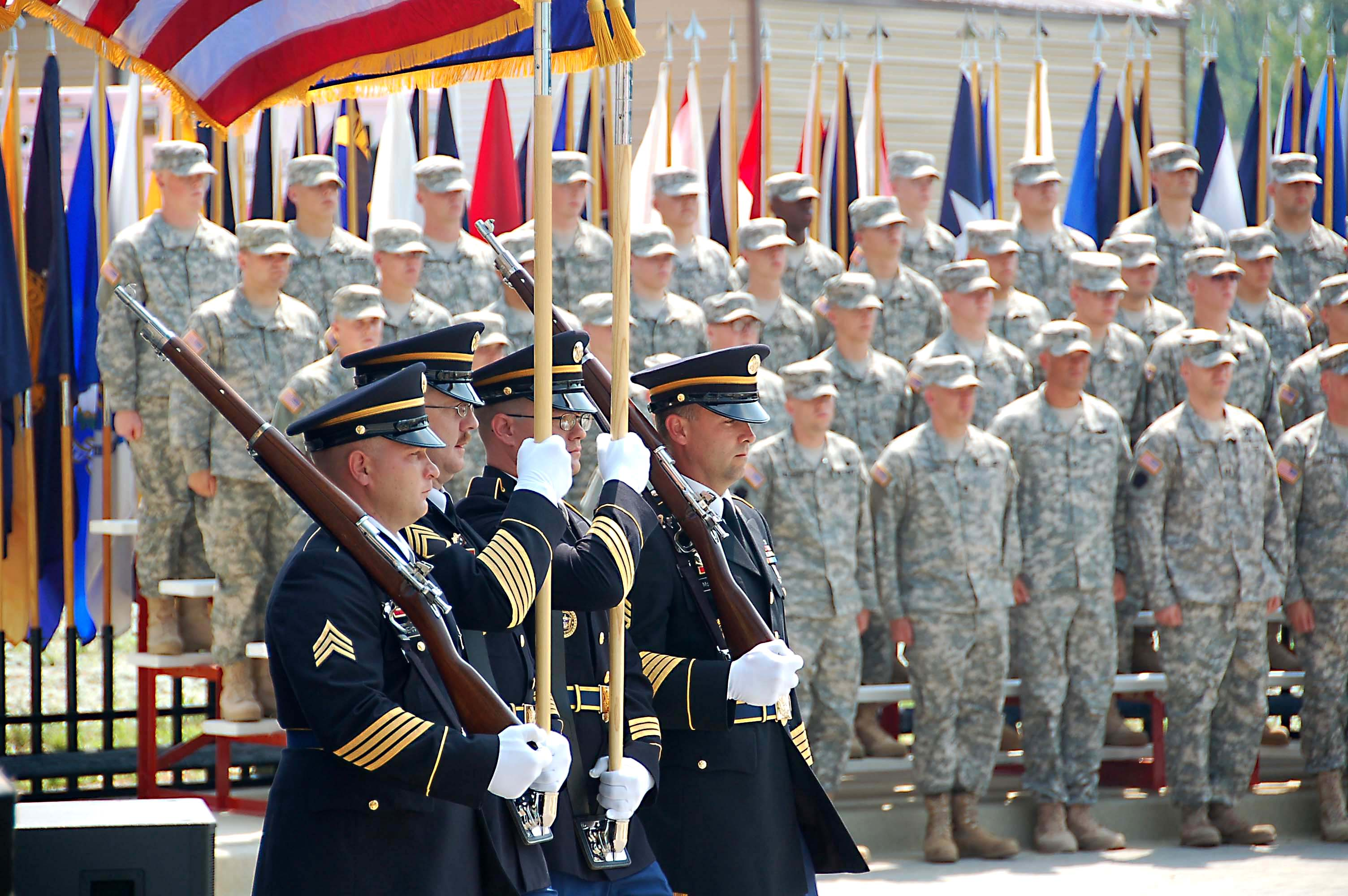
Members of the Indiana National Guard at the Muscatatuck Urban Training Center near Butlerville

Indiana is home to several current and former military installations. The largest of these is the Naval Surface Warfare Center Crane Division, approximately 25 miles southwest of Bloomington, which is the third-largest naval installation in the world, comprising approximately 108 square miles of territory. Located inside NSWC Crane is Constitution Grove, a 64,000-acre forest containing approximately 120 old-growth white oak trees selected for the maintenance of the USS Constitution, the world's oldest commissioned warship still afloat.

Other active installations include Air National Guard fighter units at Fort Wayne, and Terre Haute airports (to be consolidated at Fort Wayne under the 2005 BRAC proposal, with the Terre Haute facility remaining open as a non-flying installation). The Army National Guard conducts operations at Camp Atterbury in Edinburgh, Indiana, helicopter operations out of Shelbyville Airport and urban training at Muscatatuck Urban Training Center. The Army's Newport Chemical Depot, which is now closed and turning into a coal purifier plant.

Indiana was formerly home to two major military installations; Grissom Air Force Base near Peru (realigned to an Air Force Reserve installation in 1994) and Fort Benjamin Harrison near Indianapolis, now closed, though the Department of Defense continues to operate a large finance center there (Defense Finance and Accounting Service).

== Politics ==
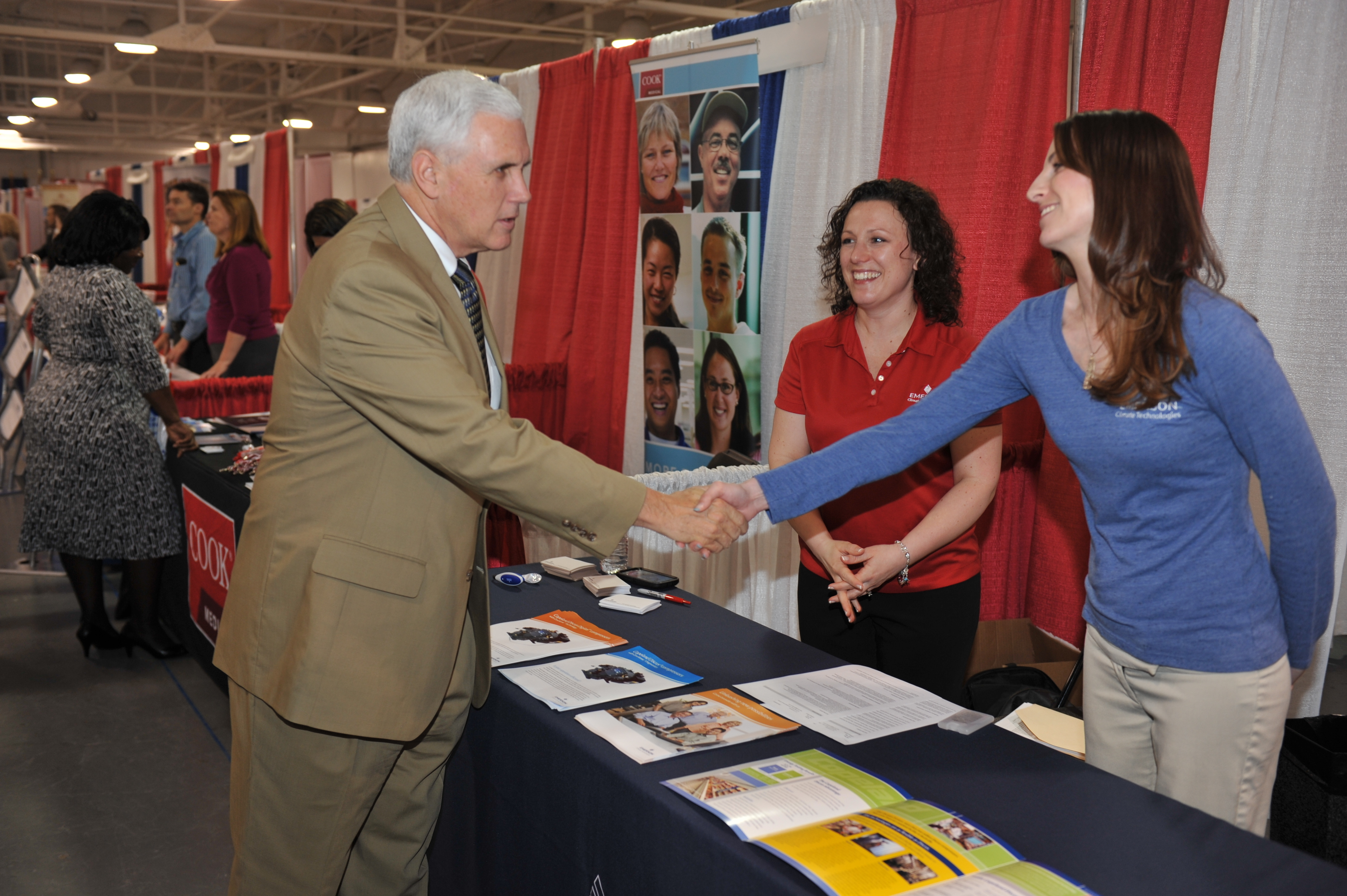
Mike Pence at the Indiana State Fair, 2014

From 1880 to 1924, a resident of Indiana was included in all but one presidential election. Indiana Representative William Hayden English was nominated for vice president and ran with Winfield Scott Hancock in the 1880 election. Former Indiana Governor Thomas A. Hendricks was elected vice president in 1884. He served until his death on November 25, 1885, under President Grover Cleveland. In 1888, former Senator from Indiana Benjamin Harrison was elected president and served one term. He remains the only President from Indiana. Indiana Senator Charles W. Fairbanks was elected vice president in 1904, serving under President Theodore Roosevelt until 1909. Fairbanks made another run for vice president with Charles Evans Hughes in 1916, but they both lost to Woodrow Wilson and former Indiana Governor Thomas R. Marshall, who served as vice president from 1913 until 1921. Not until 1988 did another presidential election involve a native of Indiana when Senator Dan Quayle was elected vice president and served one term with George H. W. Bush. Governor Mike Pence was elected vice president in 2016 and served one term with Donald Trump.

Indiana has long been considered a Republican stronghold. It was through the Republican Party that in the mid-1920s the 250,000 member Indiana Klan exerted its influence in the Indiana General Assembly, where more than half the elected representatives were Klansmen, and in the governor's office. The party suffered accordingly when the Madge Oberholtzer scandal discredited the Klan leadership. A further opening was created for the Democrats when the state shared in the country's disillusion with the Depression-era administration of President Hoover. In 1932, Franklin D. Roosevelt won the state with 55% of the vote. The ascendancy of the New Deal Democrats, however, was temporary. In 1940, Indiana was one of only 10 states to support Republican Wendell Willkie.

On 14 occasions the Republican candidate has defeated the Democrat by a double-digit margin in the state, including six times where a Republican won the state by more than 20 percentage points. Roosevelt's victory in 1932 was one of only five occasion since 1900 in which the state has favored a Democrat for president. The first was Woodrow Wilson with 43% of the vote in 1912; the last, by a narrow margin of 50% to 49%, was Barack Obama in 2008.

Most recently, Republican Donald Trump carried the state in 2016, 2020, and 2024.

While only five Democratic presidential nominees have carried Indiana since 1900, 11 Democrats were elected governor during that time. Before Mitch Daniels became governor in 2005, Democrats had held the office for 16 consecutive years. Indiana elects two senators and nine representatives to Congress. The state has 11 electoral votes in presidential elections. Seven of the districts favor the Republican Party according to the CPVI rankings; there are seven Republicans serving as representatives and two Democrats.

Historically, Republicans have been strongest in the eastern and central portions of the state, while Democrats have been strongest in the northwestern part of the state. Occasionally, certain counties in the southern part of the state will vote Democratic. Marion County, Indiana's most populous county, supported the Republican candidates from 1968 to 2000, before backing the Democrats in the 2004, 2008, 2012, 2016, 2020, and 2024 elections. Indiana's second-most populous county, Lake County, strongly supports the Democratic party and has not voted for a Republican since 1972.

In 2005, the Bay Area Center for Voting Research rated the most liberal and conservative cities in the United States on voting statistics in the 2004 presidential election, based on 237 cities with populations of more than 100,000. Five Indiana cities were mentioned in the study. On the liberal side, Gary was ranked second and South Bend came in at 83. Among conservative cities, Fort Wayne was 44th, Evansville was 60th and Indianapolis was 82nd on the list. Republicans also currently hold supermajorities in both chambers of the Indiana General Assembly and have dominated the governorship since 2005.

== Culture ==
=== Arts ===
The last decades of the 19th century began what is known as the "golden age of Indiana literature", a period that lasted until the 1920s. Edward Eggleston wrote The Hoosier Schoolmaster (1871), the first best-seller to originate in the state. Many more followed, including Maurice Thompson's Hoosier Mosaics (1875) and Lew Wallace's Ben-Hur (1880). Indiana developed a reputation as the "American heartland" after the publication of several widely read novels, beginning with Booth Tarkington's The Gentleman from Indiana (1899), Meredith Nicholson's The Hoosiers (1900), and Thompson's Alice of Old Vincennes (1900). James Whitcomb Riley, known as the "Hoosier Poet" and the most popular poet of his age, wrote hundreds of poems with Hoosier themes, including Little Orphant Annie. A unique art culture also began to develop in the late 19th century, beginning the Hoosier School of landscape painting and the Richmond Group of impressionist painters. The painters, including T. C. Steele, whose work was influenced by southern Indiana's colorful hills, were known for their use of vivid colors. Prominent musicians and composers from Indiana also reached national acclaim, including Paul Dresser, whose most popular song, "On the Banks of the Wabash, Far Away", was later adopted as the official state song.

=== Sports ===
==== Motorsports ====
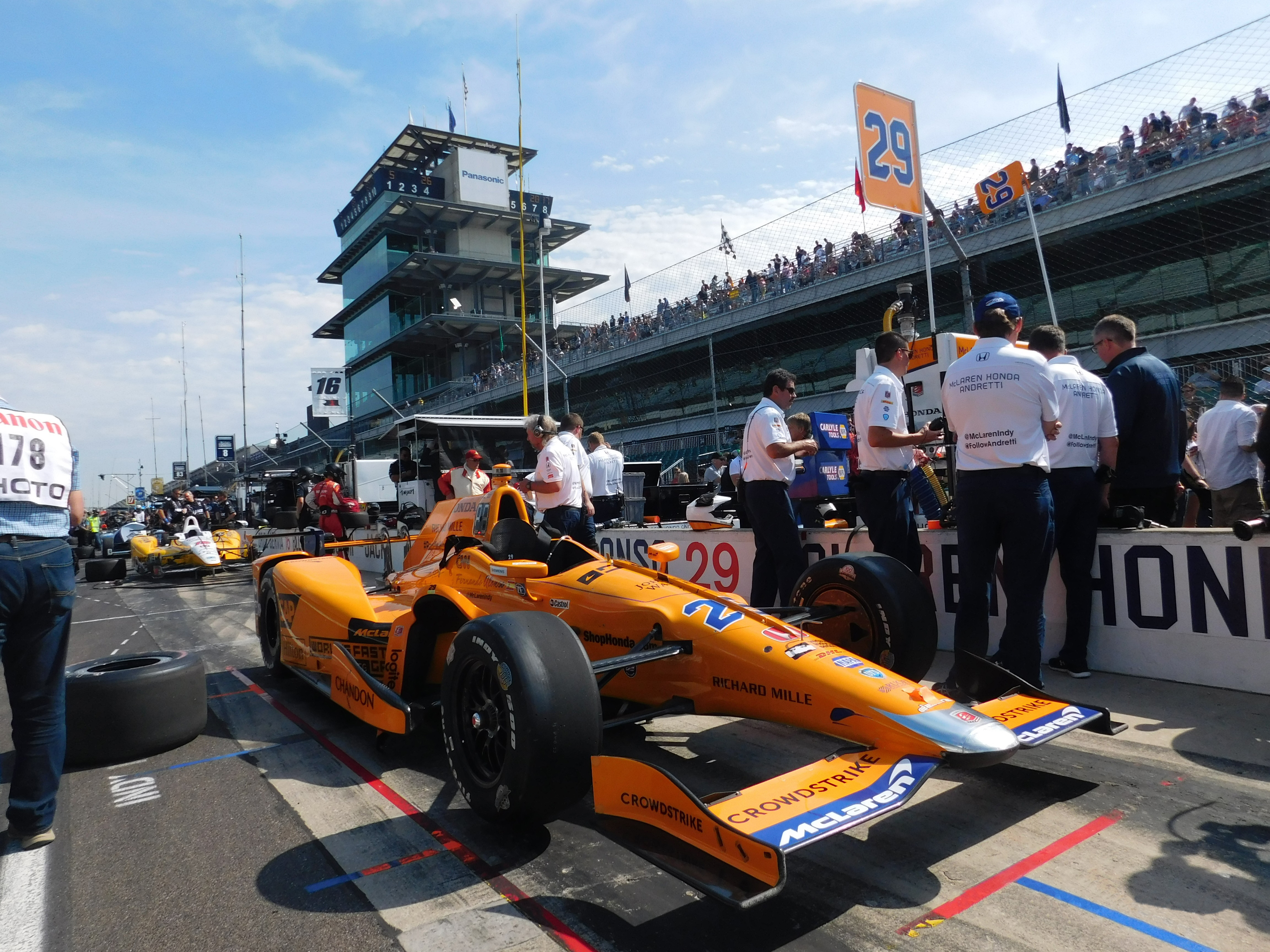
Indianapolis is home to the annual Indianapolis 500 race.

Indiana has an extensive history with auto racing. Indianapolis hosts the Indianapolis 500 mile race over Memorial Day weekend at the Indianapolis Motor Speedway every May. The name of the race is usually shortened to "Indy 500" and also goes by the nickname "The Greatest Spectacle in Racing". The race attracts more than 350,000 people every year, making it the largest single-day sporting event in the world. The track also hosts the Brickyard 400 (NASCAR) and the Red Bull Indianapolis Grand Prix. From 2000 to 2007, it hosted the United States Grand Prix (Formula One). Indiana features the world's largest and most prestigious drag race, the NHRA Mac Tools U.S. Nationals, held each Labor Day weekend at Lucas Oil Raceway at Indianapolis in Clermont, Indiana. Indiana is also host to a major unlimited hydroplane racing power boat race circuits in the major H1 Unlimited league, the Madison Regatta (Madison, Indiana).

==== Professional sports ====
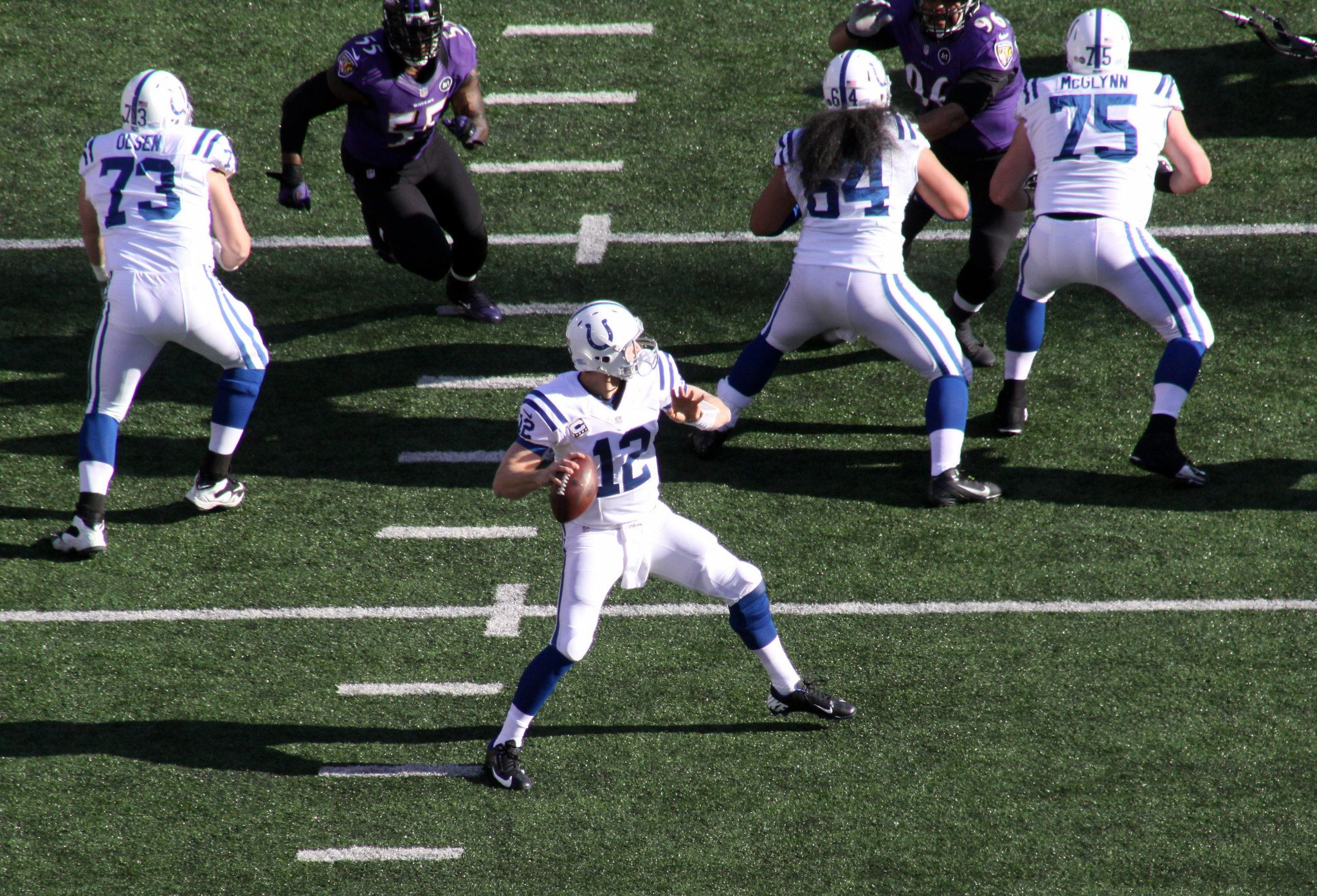
The Indianapolis Colts of the National Football League have been based in the state since 1984.

As of 2013 Indiana has produced more National Basketball Association (NBA) players per capita than any other state. Muncie has produced the most per capita of any American city, with two other Indiana cities in the top ten. It has a rich basketball heritage that reaches back to the sport's formative years. The NBA's Indiana Pacers play their home games at Gainbridge Fieldhouse; they began play in 1967 in the American Basketball Association (ABA) and joined the NBA when the leagues merged in 1976. Although James Naismith developed basketball in Springfield, Massachusetts in 1891, high school basketball was born in Indiana. In 1925, Naismith visited an Indiana basketball state finals game along with 15,000 screaming fans and later wrote "Basketball really had its origin in Indiana, which remains the center of the sport." The 1986 film Hoosiers is inspired by the story of the 1954 Indiana state champions Milan High School. Professional basketball player Larry Bird was born in West Baden Springs and was raised in French Lick. He went on to lead the Boston Celtics to the NBA championship in 1981, 1984, and 1986.

Indianapolis is home to the Indianapolis Colts. The Colts are members of the South Division of the American Football Conference. The Colts have roots back to 1913 as the Dayton Triangles. They became an official team after moving to Baltimore, MD, in 1953. In 1984, the Colts relocated to Indianapolis, leading to an eventual rivalry with the Baltimore Ravens. After calling the RCA Dome home for 25 years, the Colts play their home games at Lucas Oil Stadium in Indianapolis. While in Baltimore, the Colts won Super Bowl V. In Indianapolis, the Colts won Super Bowl XLI, bringing the franchise total to two. The Colts most recent appearance in the NFL playoffs was during their 2020 season.

Indiana was home to two charter members of the National Football League teams, the Hammond Pros and the Muncie Flyers. Another early NFL franchise, the Evansville Crimson Giants spent two seasons in the league before folding.

==== Professional teams ====
The following table shows the professional sports teams in Indiana. Teams in italic are in major men's or women's professional leagues.

Club	Sport	League	Venue (capacity)
Indianapolis Colts	American football	National Football League	Lucas Oil Stadium (62,400)
Indiana Pacers	Basketball	National Basketball Association	Gainbridge Fieldhouse (18,165)
Evansville Otters	Baseball	Frontier League	Bosse Field (5,181)
Evansville Thunderbolts	Ice hockey	SPHL	Ford Center (9,000)
Fort Wayne Komets	Ice hockey	ECHL	Allen County War Memorial Coliseum (10,480)
Fort Wayne TinCaps	Baseball	Midwest League	Parkview Field (8,100)
Gary SouthShore RailCats	Baseball	American Association	U.S. Steel Yard (6,139)
Indiana Fever	Basketball	Women's National Basketball Association	Gainbridge Fieldhouse (18,165)
Noblesville Boom	Basketball	NBA G League	Riverview Health Arena at Innovation Mile (3,400)
Indy Eleven	Soccer	USL Championship	Michael A. Carroll Stadium (10,524)
Indy Fuel	Ice hockey	ECHL	Fishers Event Center (6,500)
Indy Ignite	Volleyball	Pro Volleyball Federation	Fishers Event Center (6,500)
Indianapolis Indians	Baseball	International League	Victory Field (14,230)
Indianapolis Enforcers	Arena football	AAL	Indiana Farmers Coliseum
South Bend Cubs	Baseball	Midwest League	Four Winds Field (5,000)

The following is a table of sports venues in Indiana having a capacity in excess of 30,000:

Facility	Capacity	Municipality	Tenants
Indianapolis Motor Speedway	257,327	Speedway	Indianapolis 500; Grand Prix of Indianapolis; Brantley Gilbert Big Machine Brickyard 400; Lilly Diabetes 250
Notre Dame Stadium	84,000	Notre Dame	Notre Dame Fighting Irish football
Lucas Oil Stadium	62,421	Indianapolis	Indianapolis Colts
Ross–Ade Stadium	57,236	West Lafayette	Purdue Boilermakers football
Memorial Stadium	52,929	Bloomington	Indiana Hoosiers football

==== College athletics ====
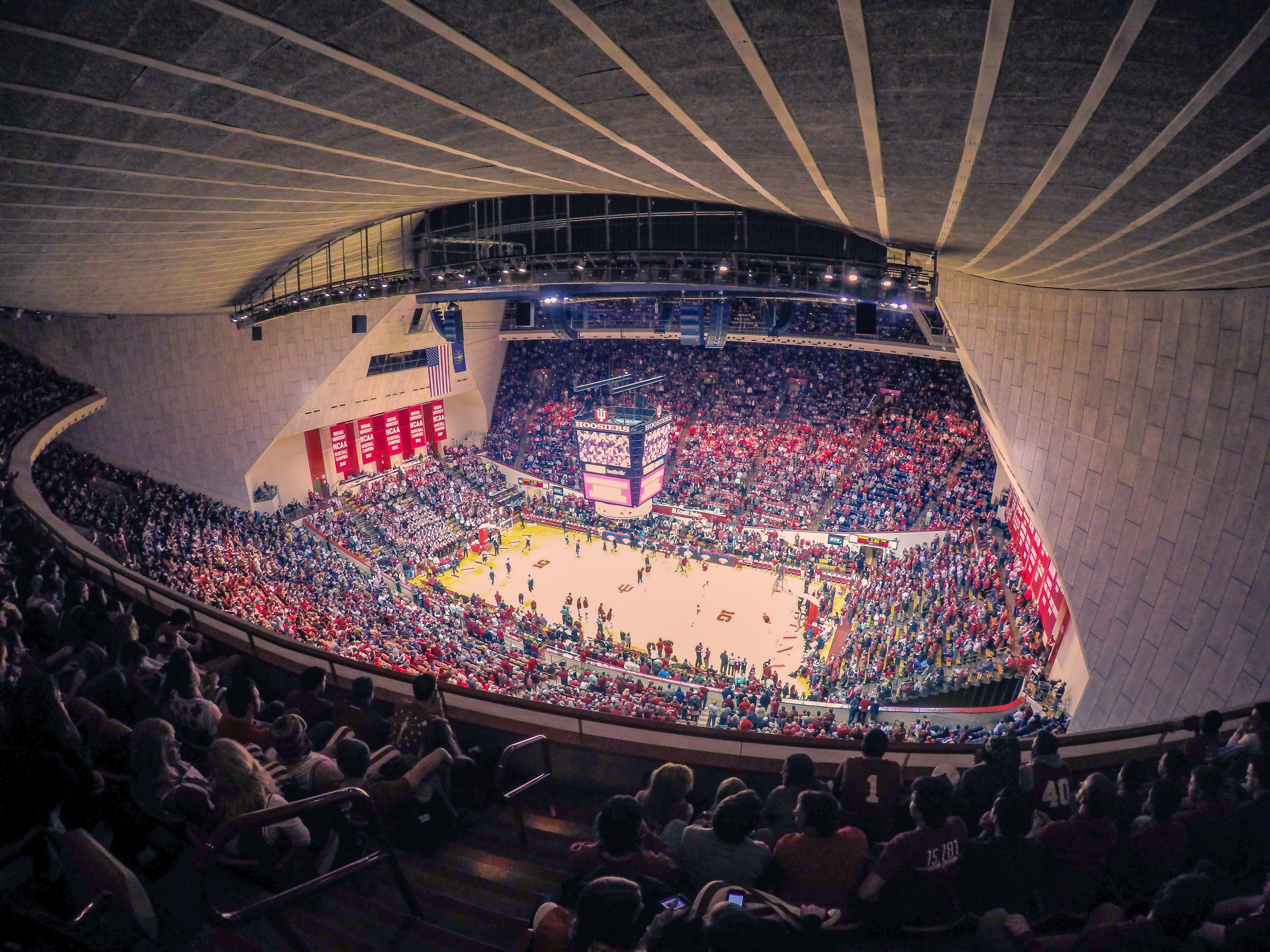
Simon Skjodt Assembly Hall, home to Indiana Hoosiers men's basketball

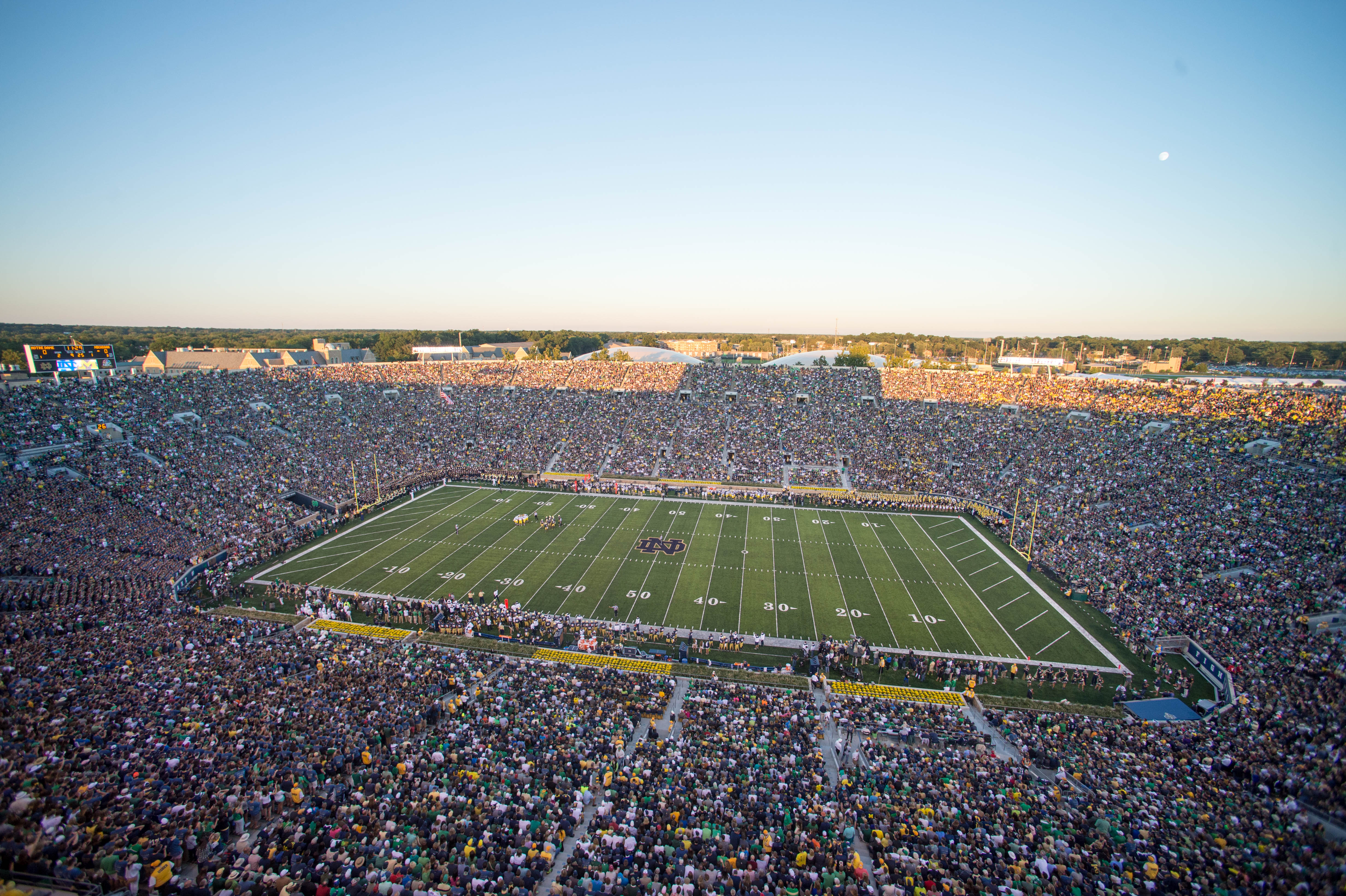
Notre Dame Stadium, home to the Fighting Irish

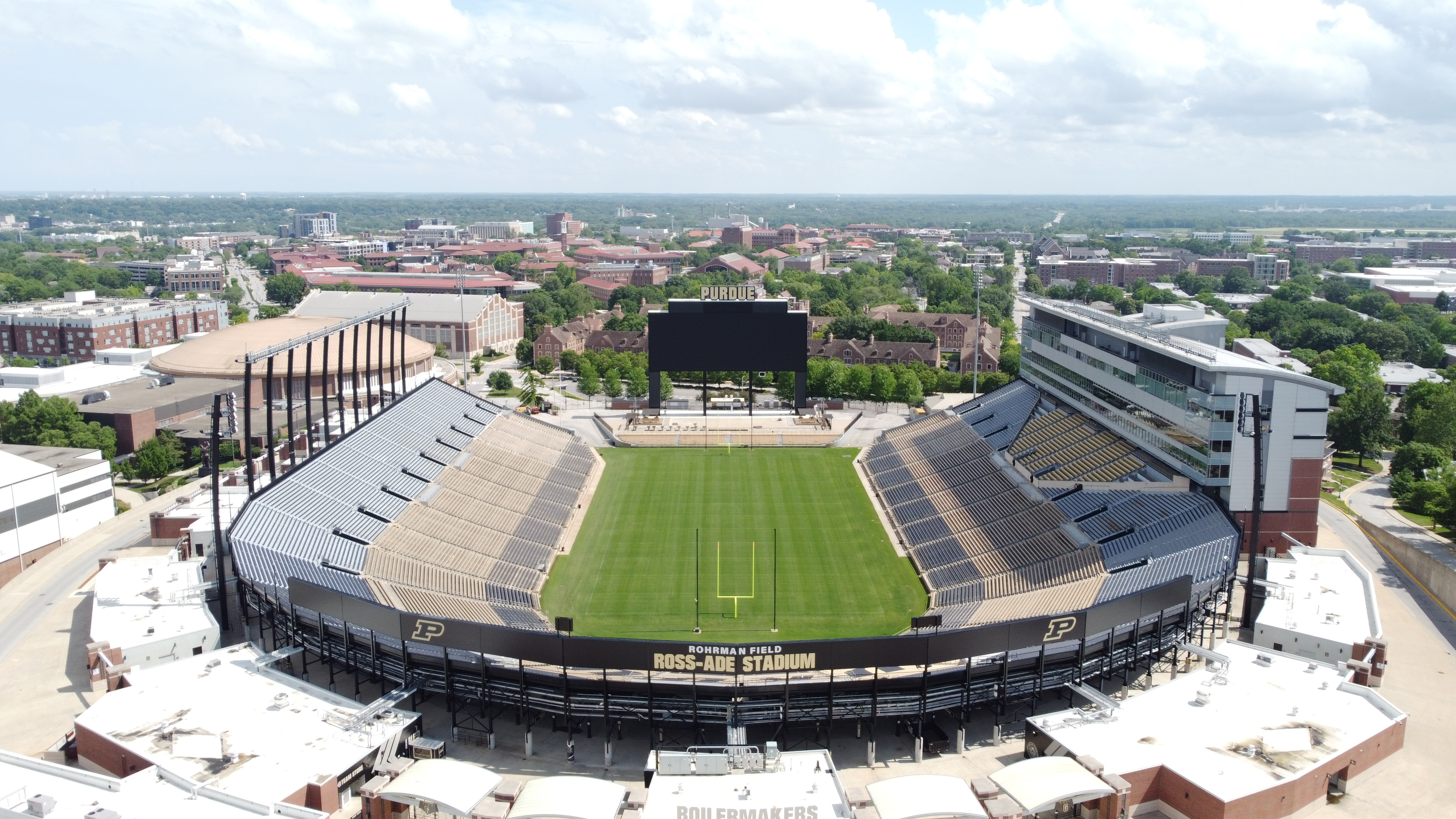
Ross-Ade Stadium, home of the Purdue Boilermakers, before the 2023 renovations

Eleven Indiana universities participate in NCAA Division I athletics, winning league and national championships over the years.

In men's basketball, the Indiana Hoosiers have won five NCAA national championships and 22 Big Ten Conference championships. The Purdue Boilermakers were selected as the national champions in 1932 before the creation of the tournament, and have won 26 Big Ten championships. The Boilermakers along with the Notre Dame Fighting Irish have both won a national championship in women's basketball.

In college football, the Notre Dame Fighting Irish have won 11 consensus national championships, as well as the Rose Bowl Game, Cotton Bowl Classic, Orange Bowl and Sugar Bowl. Meanwhile, the Purdue Boilermakers have won 10 Big Ten championships and have won the Rose Bowl and Peach Bowl. The Indiana Hoosiers football team, led by head coach Curt Cignetti, won the national championship in 2026.

Schools fielding NCAA Division I athletic programs include:

Program	Division	Conference	City
Ball State Cardinals	Division I FBS	Mid-American Conference; Missouri Valley Conference (men's swimming & diving); Midwestern Intercollegiate Volleyball Association (men's volleyball)	Muncie
Butler Bulldogs	Division I FCS	Big East Conference; Pioneer Football League	Indianapolis
Evansville Purple Aces	Division I (non-football)	Missouri Valley Conference	Evansville
Indiana Hoosiers	Division I FBS	Big Ten Conference; Mountain Pacific Sports Federation (women's water polo)	Bloomington
Indiana State Sycamores	Division I FCS	Missouri Valley Conference; Missouri Valley Football Conference	Terre Haute
IU Indy Jaguars	Division I (non-football)	Horizon League	Indianapolis
Notre Dame Fighting Irish	Division I FBS	Atlantic Coast Conference; Big Ten Conference (men's ice hockey); Independent (football)	South Bend
Purdue Boilermakers	Division I FBS	Big Ten Conference	West Lafayette
Purdue Fort Wayne Mastodons	Division I (non-football)	Horizon League; Midwestern Intercollegiate Volleyball Association (men's volleyball)	Fort Wayne
Southern Indiana Screaming Eagles	Division I (non-football)	Ohio Valley Conference; Summit League (swimming & diving); Horizon League (men's tennis)	Evansville
Valparaiso Beacons	Division I FCS	Missouri Valley Conference; Pioneer Football League; Conference USA (women's bowling)	Valparaiso

== Economy and infrastructure ==
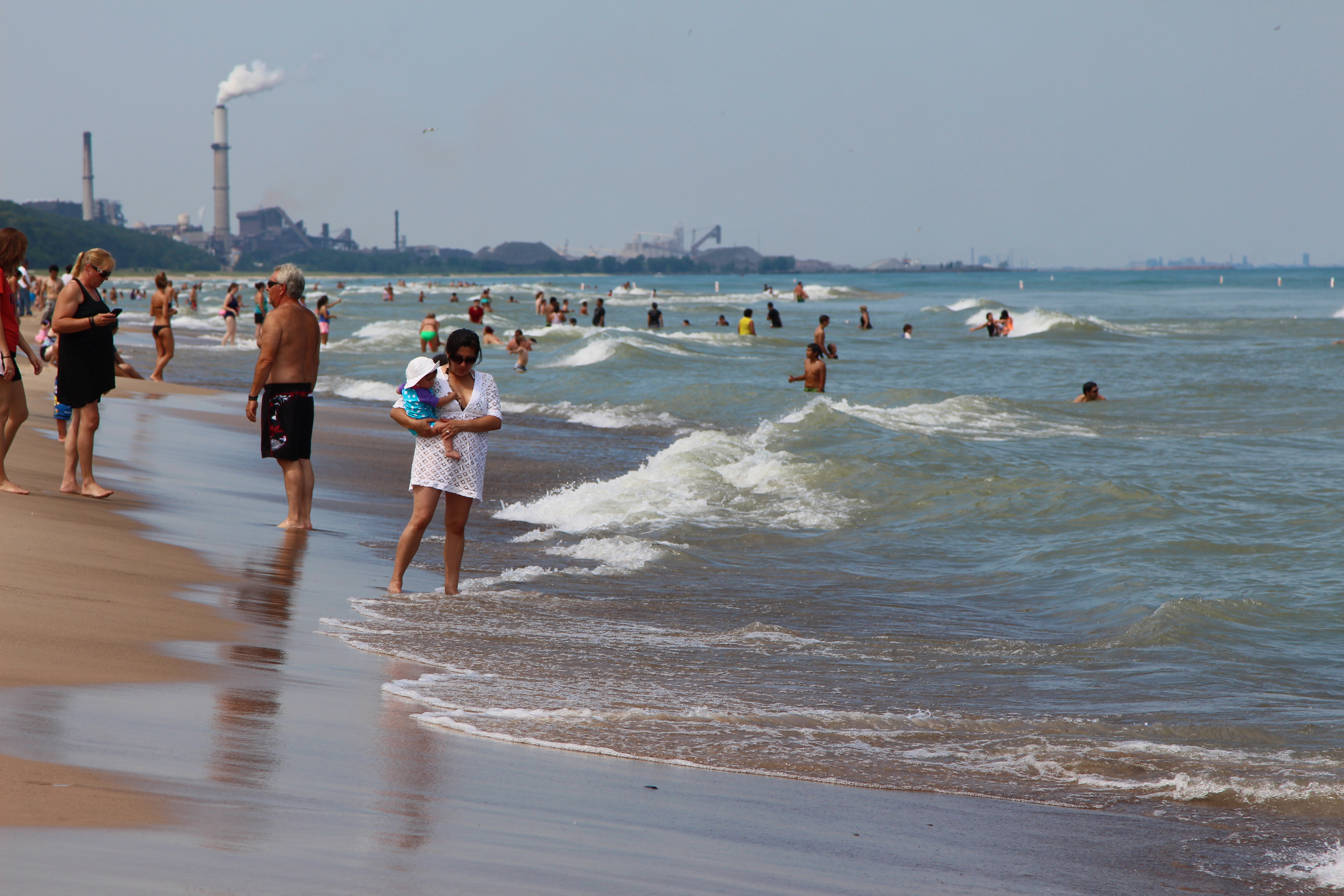
Lake Michigan's beaches, popular with tourists, are juxtaposed with heavy industry.

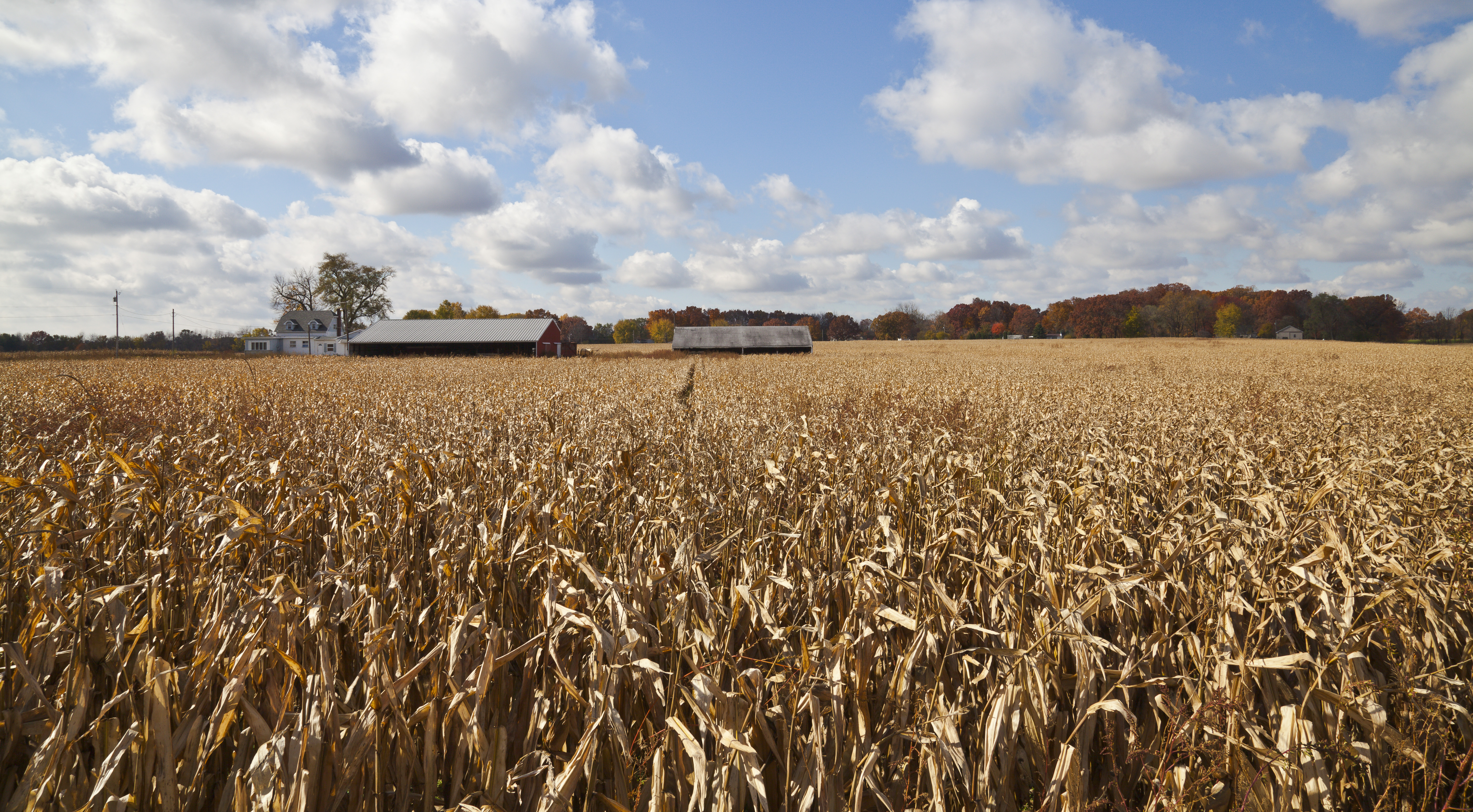
Indiana is the fifth largest corn-producing state in the U.S., with over a billion bushels harvested in 2013.

In 2017, Indiana had a civilian labor force of nearly 3.4 million, the 15th largest in the United States. Indiana has an unemployment rate of 3.7%, as of May 2025. The total gross state product in 2016 was $347.2 billion. A high percentage of Indiana's income is from manufacturing. According to the Bureau of Labor Statistics, nearly 17% of the state's non-farm workforce is employed in manufacturing, the highest of any state in the U.S. The state's five leading exports were motor vehicles and auto parts, pharmaceutical products, industrial machinery, optical and medical equipment, and electric machinery.

Despite its reliance on manufacturing, Indiana has been less affected by declines in traditional Rust Belt manufacturers than many of its neighbors. The explanation appears to be certain factors in the labor market. First, much of the heavy manufacturing, such as industrial machinery and steel, requires highly skilled labor, and firms are often willing to locate where hard-to-train skills already exist. Second, Indiana's labor force is primarily in medium-sized and smaller cities rather than in very large and expensive metropolises. This makes it possible for firms to offer somewhat lower wages for these skills than would normally be paid. Firms often see in Indiana a chance to obtain higher than average skills at lower than average wages.

Indiana is in the U.S. Corn Belt and Grain Belt. It has a feedlot-style system raising corn to fatten hogs and cattle. Along with corn, soybeans are also a major cash crop. Its proximity to large urban centers, such as Indianapolis and Chicago, assure dairying, egg production, and specialty horticulture occur. Other crops include melons, tomatoes, grapes, mint, popping corn, and tobacco in the southern counties. Most of the original land was not prairie and had to be cleared of deciduous trees. Many parcels of woodland remain and support a furniture-making sector in southern Indiana.

=== Business ===
In 2025, Indiana was home to seven Fortune 500 companies. These included Eli Lilly and Company, the pharmaceutical giant and the state's largest corporation, headquartered in Indianapolis. Indiana ranks fifth among all U.S. states in total sales and shipments of pharmaceutical products and second in the number of biopharmaceutical related jobs.

Northwest Indiana has been the largest steel producing center in the U.S. since 1975, with Fort Wayne hosting Fortune 500 Steel Dynamics, the third largest producer of carbon steel products in the United States.

Newer manufacturing sectors include orthopedic and surgical products, represented by Zimmer Biomet, based in Warsaw. Among the major service providers are Elevance Health (formerly Anthem, Inc.) in Indianapolis which is ranked among the nation's top healthcare insurers.

In 2025, small businesses (generally defined as those with under 500 employees) accounted for 43 percent of Indiana's employees. While the number of small businesses has increased since the end of the COVID pandemic in 2022, it has done so without a commensurate increase in employment. Many are sole traders and self-employed contractors.

Evaluating factors such as the private sector business creation rate, patent grants, tax burden, venture capital investment and how many top businesses are headquartered in a state, in 2025, US News & World Report ranked Indiana 39th among the 50 states for its "business environment".

=== Taxation ===
Tax is collected by the Indiana Department of Revenue.

Indiana has a flat state income tax rate of 3.23%. Many of the state's counties also collect income tax. The state sales tax rate is 7% with exemptions for food, prescription medications and over-the-counter medications. In some jurisdictions, an additional Food and Beverage Tax is charged, at a rate of 1% (Marion County's rate is 2%), on sales of prepared meals and beverages.

Property taxes are imposed on both real and personal property in Indiana and are administered by the Department of Local Government Finance. Property is subject to taxation by a variety of taxing units (schools, counties, townships, municipalities, and libraries), making the total tax rate the sum of the tax rates imposed by all taxing units in which a property is located. However, a "circuit breaker" law enacted on March 19, 2008, limits property taxes to 1% of assessed value for homeowners, 2% for rental properties and farmland, and 3% for businesses.

=== State budget ===
Indiana does not have a legal requirement to balance the state budget either in law or its constitution. Instead, it has a constitutional ban on assuming debt. The state has a Rainy Day Fund and for healthy reserves proportional to spending. Indiana is one of six U.S. states to not allow a line-item veto.

Since 2010, Indiana has been one of a few states to hold AAA bond credit ratings with the Big Three credit rating agencies, the highest possible rating.

=== Energy ===
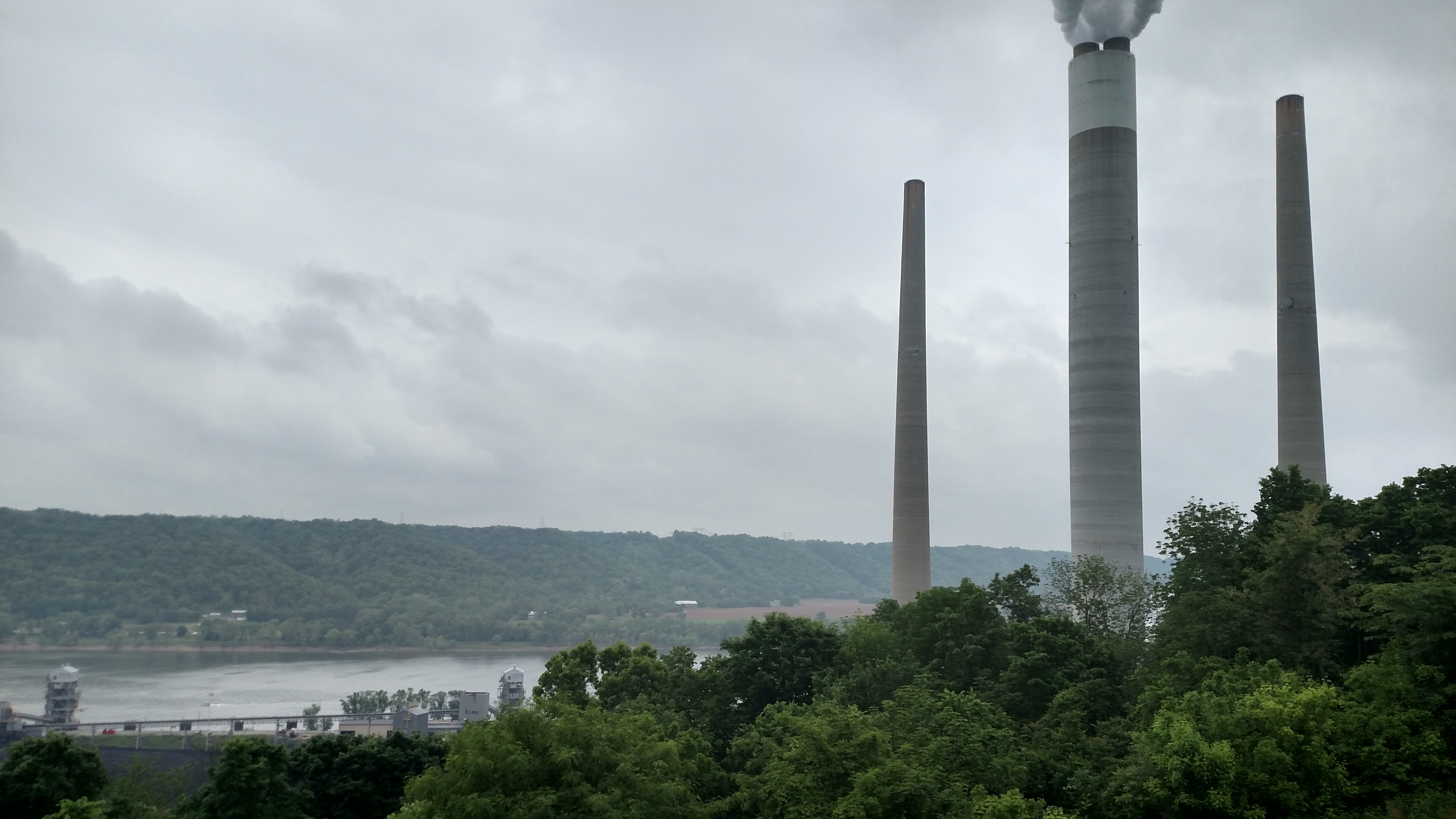
Coal-fired electric plants, like Clifty Creek Power Plant in Madison, produced about 85 percent of Indiana's energy supply in 2014.

Indiana's power production chiefly consists of the consumption of fossil fuels, mainly coal. It has 24 coal power plants, including the country's largest coal power plant, Gibson Generating Station, across the Wabash River from Mount Carmel, Illinois. Indiana was also home to the coal-fired plant with the highest sulfur dioxide emissions in the United States, the Gallagher power plant, just west of New Albany.

In 2010, Indiana had estimated coal reserves of 57 billion tons, and state mining operations produced 35 million tons of coal annually. Indiana also has at least 900 million barrels of petroleum reserves in the Trenton Field, though they are not easily recoverable. While Indiana has made commitments to increasing the use of renewable resources such as wind, hydroelectric, biomass, or solar power, progress has been very slow, mainly because of the continued abundance of coal in southern Indiana. Most of the new plants in the state have been coal gasification plants. Another source is hydroelectric power.

Wind power has been growing rapidly. Estimates in 2006 raised Indiana's wind capacity from 30 MW at 50 m turbine height to 40,000 MW at 70 m, and to 130,000 MW at 100 m, in 2010, the height of newer turbines. By the end of 2011, Indiana had installed 1,340 MW of wind turbines. In 2020, this total had more than doubled to 2,968 MW.

=== Transportation ===
==== Airports ====
Indianapolis International Airport serves the greater Indianapolis area. It was rebuilt in November 2008 and offers a midfield passenger terminal, concourses, air traffic control tower, parking garage, and airfield and apron improvements.

Other major airports include Evansville Regional Airport, Fort Wayne International Airport (which houses the 122d Fighter Wing of the Air National Guard), and South Bend International Airport. A long-standing proposal to turn Gary Chicago International Airport into Chicago's third major airport received a boost in early 2006 with the approval of $48 million in federal funding over the next ten years.

No airlines operate out of Terre Haute Regional Airport but it is used primarily for general aviation. Since 1954, the 181st Fighter Wing of the Indiana Air National Guard was stationed there, but the Base Realignment and Closure (BRAC) Proposal of 2005 stated the 181st would lose its fighter mission and F-16 aircraft, leaving the Terre Haute facility a general-aviation-only facility.

Louisville International Airport, across the Ohio River in Louisville, Kentucky, serves southern Indiana, as does Cincinnati/Northern Kentucky International Airport in Hebron, Kentucky. Many residents of Northwest Indiana, which is primarily in the Chicago Metropolitan Area, use Chicago's airports, O'Hare International Airport and Chicago Midway International Airport.

==== Highways ====
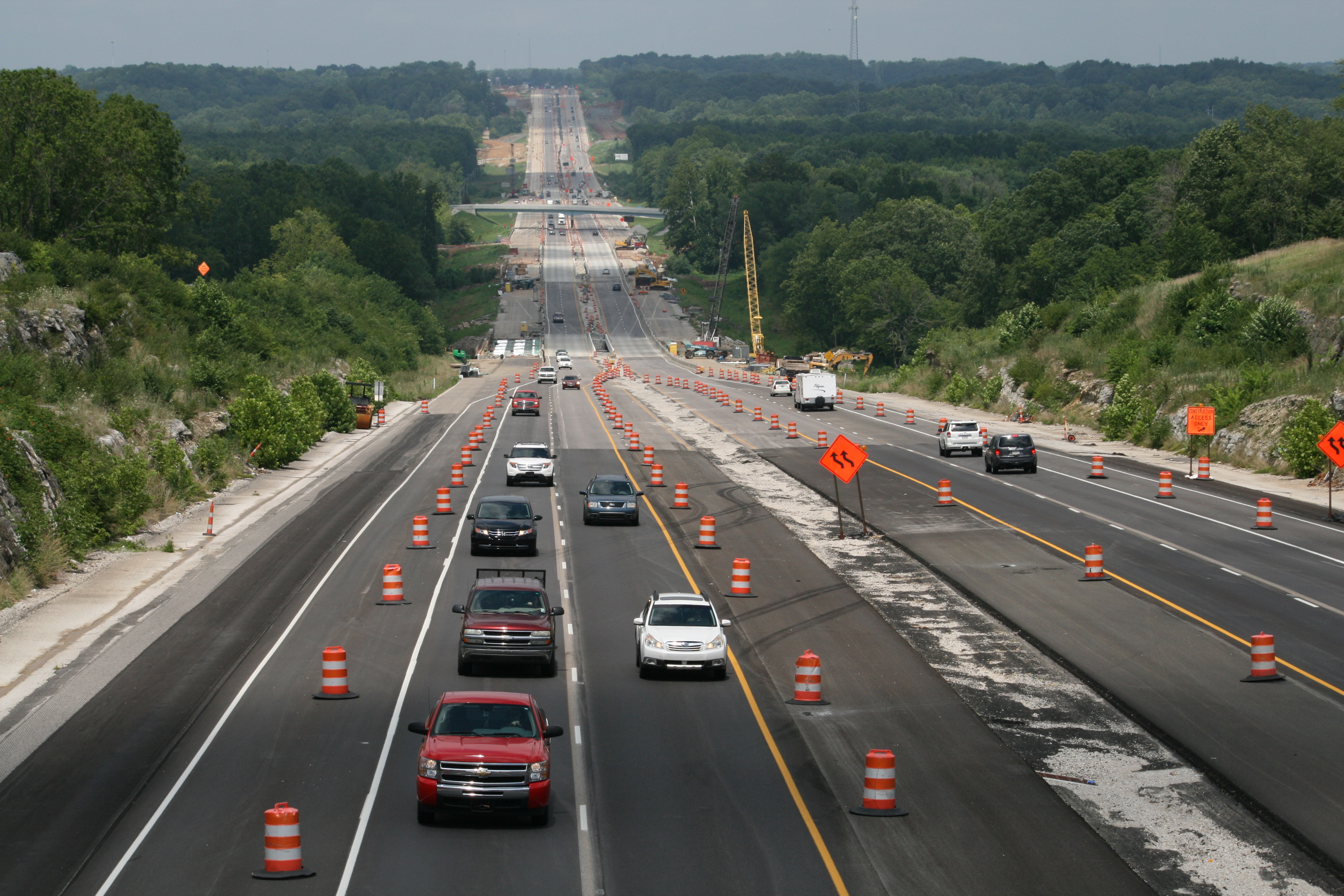
The Interstate 69 extension project in Monroe County

The U.S. Interstate highways in Indiana are I-64, I-65, I-265, I-465, I-865, I-69, I-469, I-70, I-74, I-80, I-90, I-94, and I-275. The various highways intersecting in and around Indianapolis, along with its historical status as a major railroad hub, and the canals that once crossed Indiana, are the source of the state's motto, the Crossroads of America. There are also many U.S. routes and state highways maintained by the Indiana Department of Transportation. These are numbered according to the same convention as U.S. Highways. Indiana allows highways of different classifications to have the same number. For example, I-64 and Indiana State Road 64 both exist (rather close to each other) in Indiana, but are two distinct roads with no relation to one another.

A $4.3 billion project extending I-69 an additional 142 miles (229 km) from Evansville to Indianapolis was completed in 2024.

==== County roads ====
Most Indiana counties use a grid-based system to identify county roads; this system replaced the older arbitrary system of road numbers and names, and (among other things) makes it much easier to identify the sources of calls placed to the 9-1-1 system. Such systems are easier to implement in the glacially flattened northern and central portions of the state. Rural counties in the southern third of the state are less likely to have grids and more likely to rely on unsystematic road names (for example, Crawford, Harrison, Perry, Scott, and Washington Counties).

There are also counties in the northern portions of the state that have never implemented a grid or have only partially implemented one. Some counties are also laid out in an almost diamond-like grid system (e.g., Clark, Floyd, Gibson, and Knox Counties). Such a system is also almost useless in those situations as well. Knox County once operated two different grid systems for county roads because the county was laid out using two different survey grids, but has since decided to use road names and combine roads instead.

Notably, the county road grid system of St. Joseph County, whose major city is South Bend, uses perennial (tree) names (i.e. Ash, Hickory, Ironwood, etc.) in alphabetical order for north–south roads and presidential and other noteworthy names (i.e., Adams, Edison, Lincoln Way, etc.) in alphabetical order for east–west roads. There are exceptions to this rule in downtown South Bend and Mishawaka. Hamilton County's east–west roads continue Indianapolis's numbered street system from 96th Street at the Marion County line to 296th street at the Tipton County line.

==== Rail ====
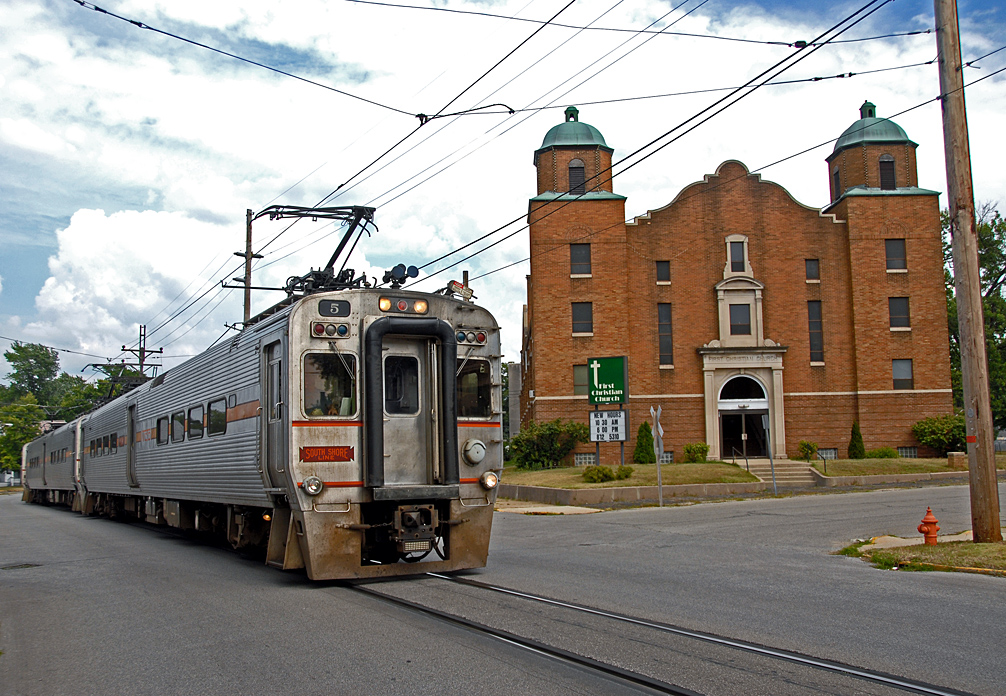
A South Shore commuter train in Michigan City

Indiana has more than 4,255 railroad route miles (6,848 km), of which 91% are operated by Class I railroads, principally CSX Transportation and the Norfolk Southern Railway. Other Class I railroads in Indiana include the Canadian National Railway and Soo Line Railroad, a CPKC subsidiary, as well as Amtrak. The remaining miles are operated by 37 regional, local, and switching and terminal railroads. The South Shore Line is one of the country's most notable commuter rail systems, extending from Chicago to South Bend. Indiana is implementing an extensive rail plan prepared in 2002 by the Parsons Corporation. Many recreational trails, such as the Monon Trail and Cardinal Greenway, have been created from abandoned rails routes.

==== Ports ====
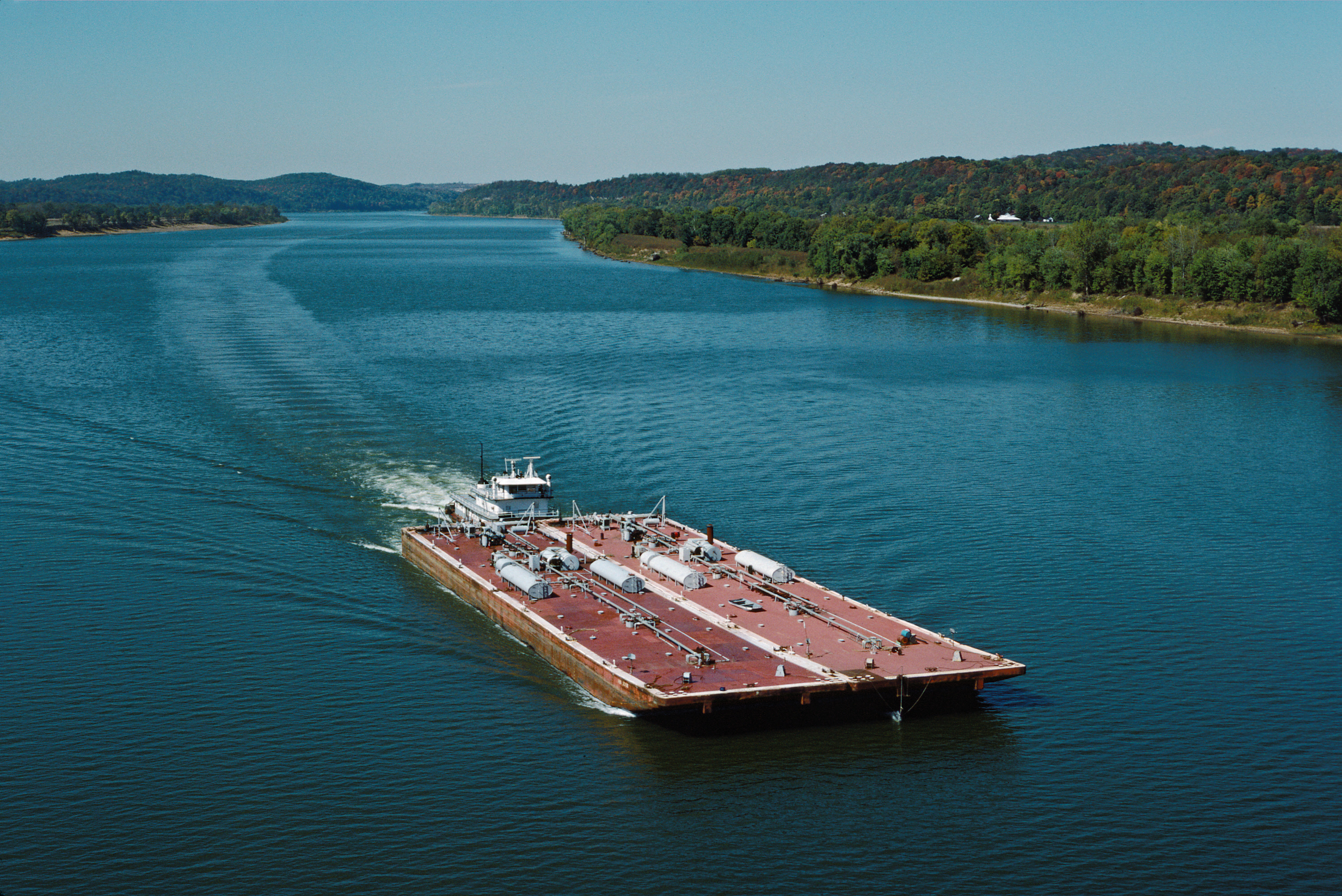
Barges are a common sight along the Ohio River. Ports of Indiana manages three maritime ports in the state, two located on the Ohio.

Indiana annually ships more than 70 million tons of cargo by water each year, which ranks 14th among all U.S. states. More than half of Indiana's border is water, which includes 400 miles (640 km) of direct access to two major freight transportation arteries: the Great Lakes/St. Lawrence Seaway (via Lake Michigan) and the Inland Waterway System (via the Ohio River). The Ports of Indiana manages three major ports which include Burns Harbor, Jeffersonville, and Mount Vernon.

== Education ==
=== Public schools ===
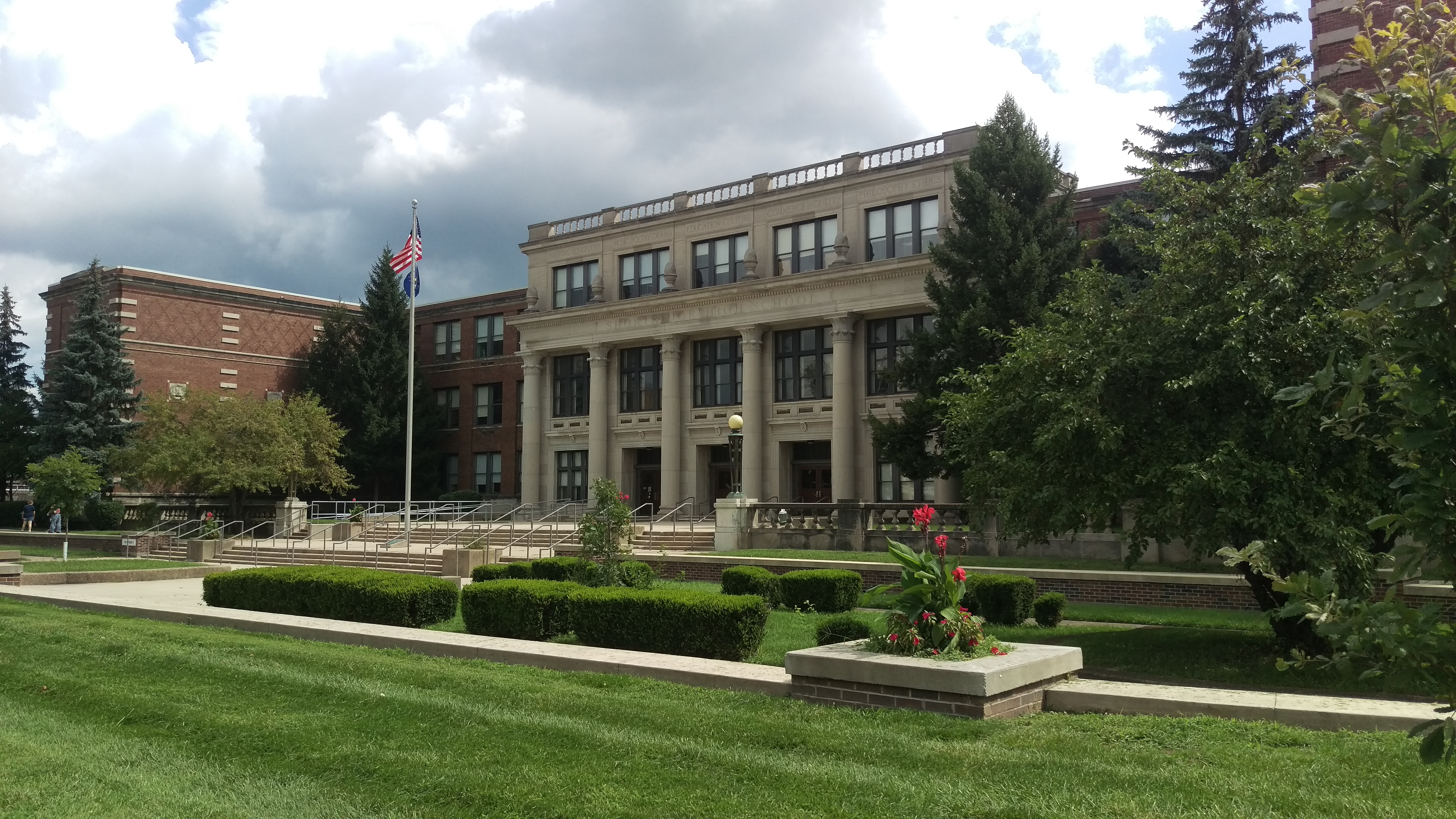
Established in 1864, Shortridge High School in Indianapolis is Indiana's oldest free public high school.

Indiana's 1816 constitution was the first in the country to implement a state-funded public school system. It also allotted one township for a public university. However, the plan turned out to be far too idealistic for a pioneer society, as tax money was not accessible for its organization. In the 1840s, Caleb Mills pressed the need for tax-supported schools, and in 1851 his advice was included in the new state constitution. In 1843 the Legislature ruled that African Americans could not attend the public schools, leading to the foundation of Union Literary Institute and other schools for them, funded by donations or the students themselves. The Indiana General Assembly authorized separate but equal schools for Black students in 1869, and in 1877 language in the law changed to allow for integrated schools.

Although the growth of the public school system was held up by legal entanglements, many public elementary schools were in use by 1870. Most children in Indiana attend public schools, but nearly ten percent attend private schools and parochial schools. About half of all college students in Indiana are enrolled in state-supported four-year schools.

Indiana public schools have gone through several changes throughout Indiana's history. Modern, public school standards have been implemented all throughout the state. These new standards were adopted in April 2014. The overall goal of these new state standards is to ensure Indiana students have the necessary skills and requirements needed to enter college or the workforce upon high school graduation. State standards can be found for nearly every major subject taught in Indiana public schools. Mathematics, English/Language Arts, Science, and Social Studies are among the top, prioritized standards. In 2022, the Indiana Department of Education reported that the state's overall graduation rate was 86.7%, down one percent from 2021.

The rate of Indiana high school students attending college fell to 53% in 2022, a significant decline from 65% in 2017. Indiana's college-going rates have fallen further than most states'. Trends reveal widening gaps for ethnic minorities and low-income families.

=== Vocational schools ===
Indiana has a strong vocational school system. Charles Allen Prossor, known as the father of vocational education in the United States, was from New Albany. The Charles Allen Prosser School of Technology is named in his honor. There are vocational schools in every region of Indiana, and most Indiana students can freely attend a vocational school during their high school years and receive training and job placement assistance in trade jobs. The International Union Of Operating Engineers (IUOE) has seven local unions in Indiana, offering apprenticeship and training opportunities. According to the Electrical Training Alliance website, there are ten electrical training centers in Indiana.

=== Colleges and universities ===
The state's community college system, Ivy Tech Community College of Indiana, serves nearly 200,000 students annually, making it the state's largest public post-secondary educational institution and the nation's largest singly accredited statewide community college system. In 2008, the Indiana University system agreed to shift most of its associate (2-year) degrees to the Ivy Tech Community College System.

The largest non-community educational institution is Indiana University, a multi-campus university system; its flagship campus at Bloomington was endorsed as the Indiana Seminary in 1820. Indiana State University was established in Terre Haute as the state's Normal School in 1865. Purdue University was chartered in West Lafayette as the state's land-grant university in 1869 and is also now a multi-campus institution. The three other independent state universities are Vincennes University (founded in 1801 by the Indiana Territory), Ball State University (founded 1918 as the East Division of Indiana State), and the University of Southern Indiana (founded 1965 as the Evansville campus of Indiana State).

Many of Indiana's private colleges and universities are affiliated with religious organizations. The University of Notre Dame, Marian University, and the University of Saint Francis are Roman Catholic schools. Universities affiliated with Protestant denominations include Anderson University, Butler University, Huntington University, Manchester University, Indiana Wesleyan University, Taylor University, Franklin College, Hanover College, DePauw University, Earlham College, Valparaiso University, the University of Indianapolis, and the University of Evansville.

The state has several universities ranked among the best by U.S. News & World Report. The University of Notre Dame ranks among the top 20, Purdue University among the top 50, and Indiana University Bloomington among the top 100. The three former schools are all R1 Research Institutions, along with Indiana University Indianapolis from the former Indiana University–Purdue University Indianapolis. Butler, Valparaiso, and the University of Evansville are ranked among the top ten in the Regional University Midwest Rankings. Purdue's engineering programs are ranked fourth in the country. In addition, Taylor University is ranked first in the Regional College Midwest Rankings and Rose-Hulman Institute of Technology has been considered the nation's top undergraduate engineering school for 25 consecutive years. In 2023, the University of Notre Dame had the seventh largest endowment among private postsecondary institutions in the U.S. (11th overall).

The state is also home to the largest medical school system in the country (the Indiana University School of Medicine) and a smaller, osteopathic medical school (Marian University's Tom and Julie Wood College of Osteopathic Medicine). In addition, Indiana boasts one veterinary medical school (the Purdue College of Veterinary Medicine), one optometry school (Indiana University School of Optometry), three pharmacy schools (the Purdue College of Pharmacy, Butler College of Pharmacy and Health Sciences, and the Manchester College of Pharmacy, Natural, and Health Sciences) and four law schools (IU Maurer School of Law, IU McKinney School of Law, Notre Dame Law School, and Purdue Global Law School).

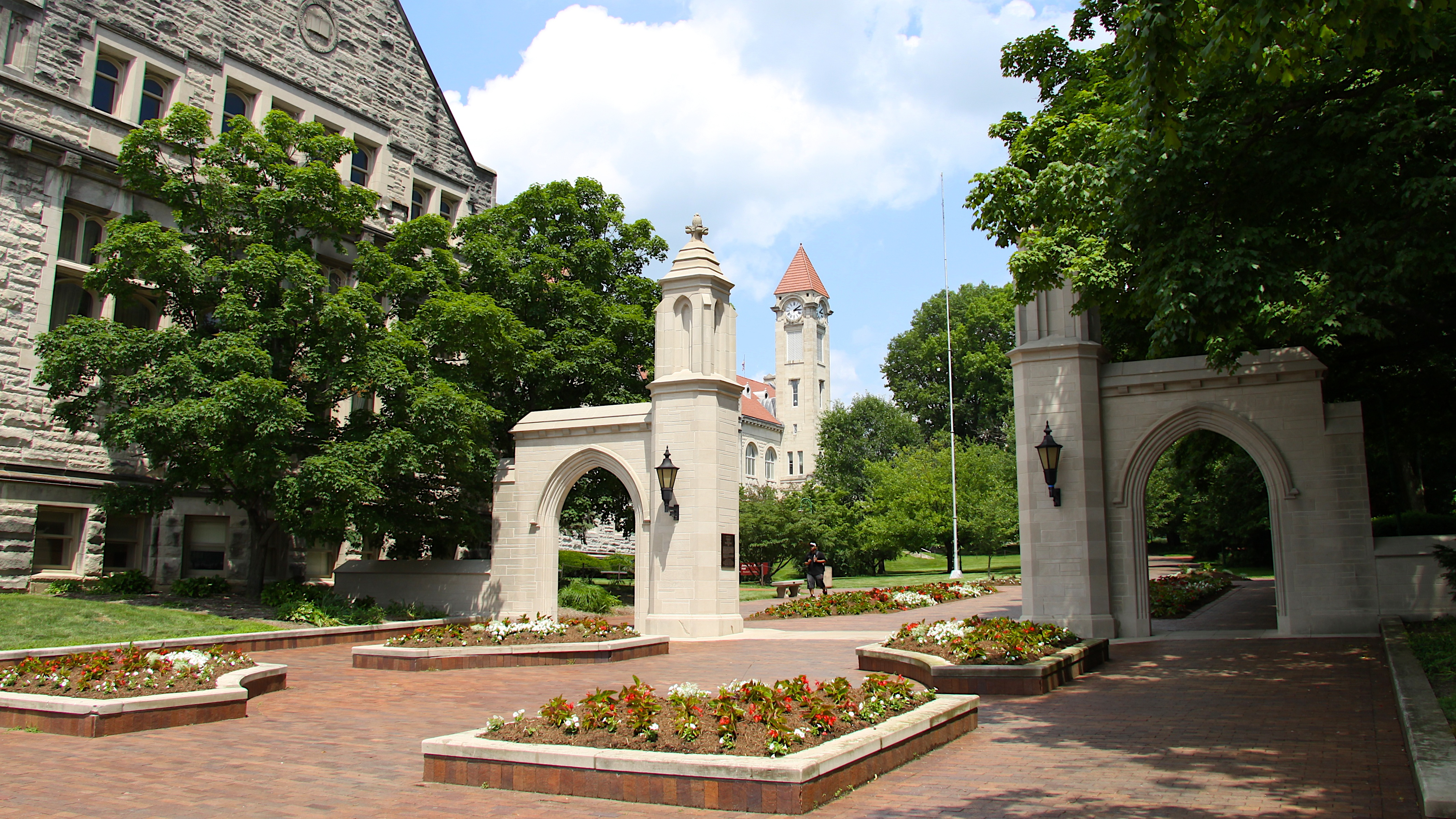
Indiana University Bloomington

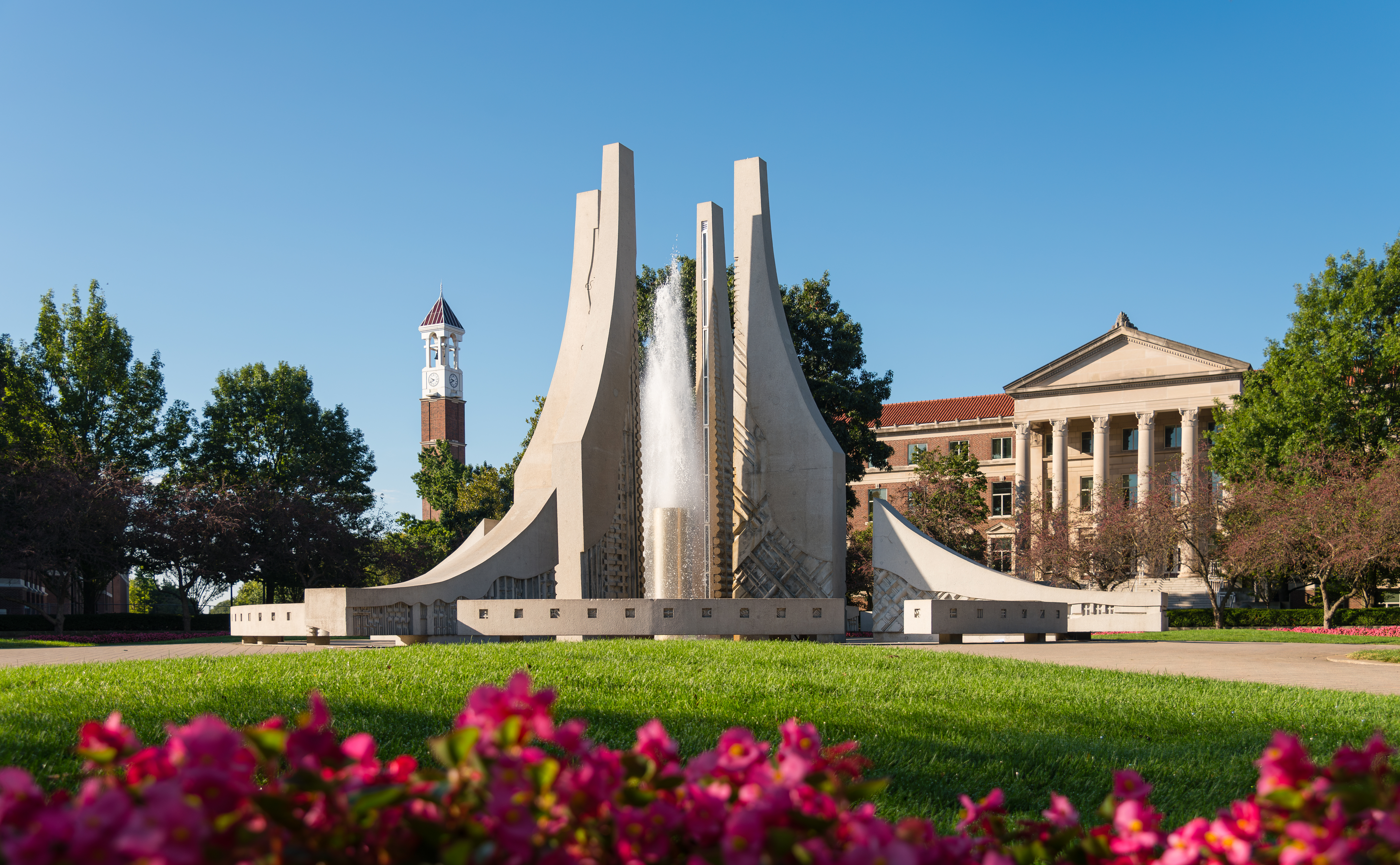
Purdue University in West Lafayette

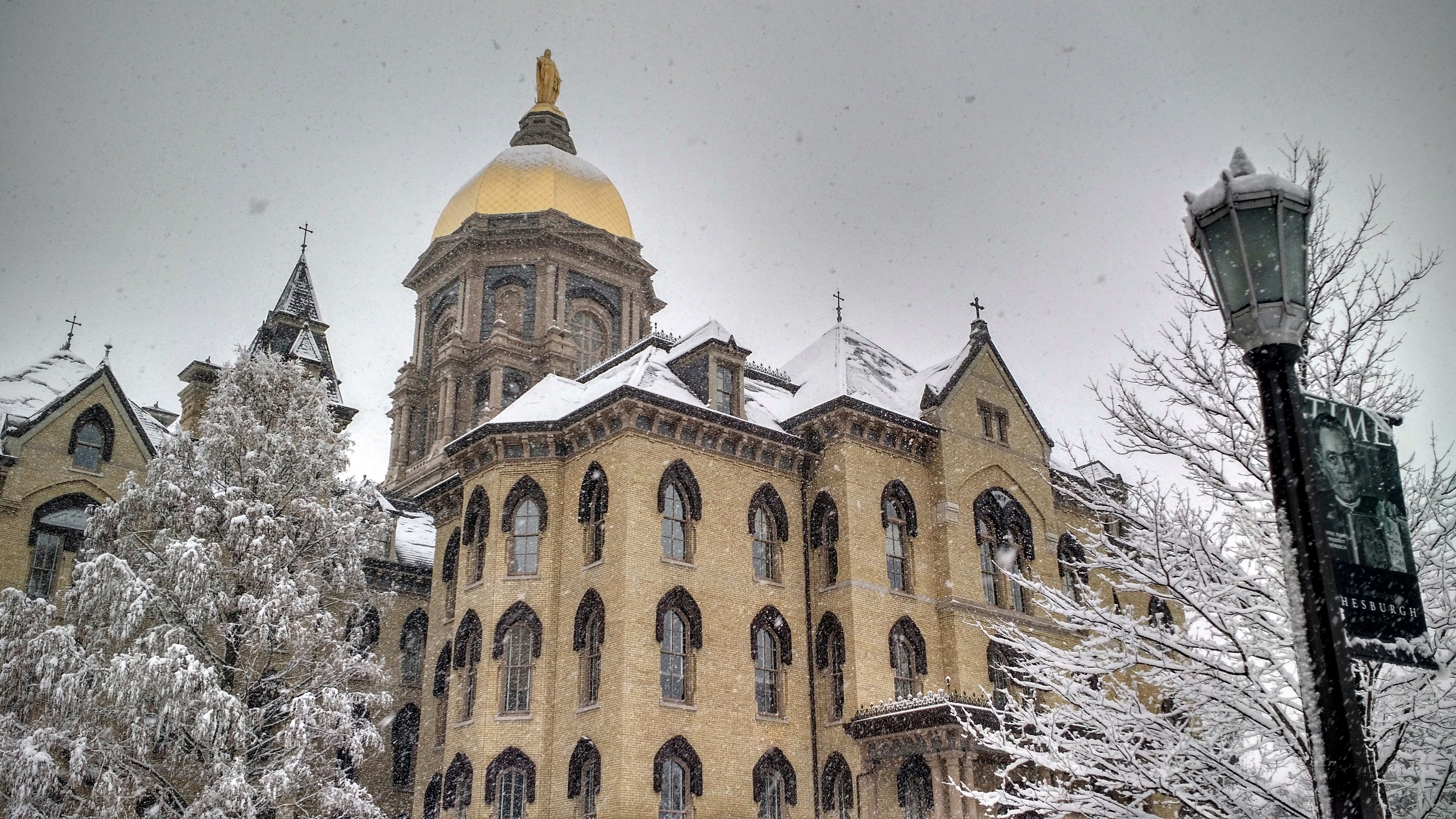
University of Notre Dame

== Sister jurisdictions ==
Indiana has three official partner jurisdictions:

- Zhejiang, China (1987)
- Tochigi Prefecture, Japan (1999)
- Karnataka, India (2017)

== See also ==
- Index of Indiana-related articles
- Outline of Indiana
- List of people from Indiana
- USS Indiana, 4 ships

== Bibliography ==
- Bodenhamer, David J.; Barrows, Robert Graham; Vanderstel, David Gordon (1994). The Encyclopedia of Indianapolis. Indiana University Press. ISBN 978-0-253-31222-8.
- Brill, Marlene Targ (2005). Indiana. Marshall Cavendish. ISBN 978-0-7614-2020-0.
- Carmony, Donald F. (1998). Indiana, 1816 to 1850: The Pioneer Era. Indianapolis: Indiana Historical Society. ISBN 978-0-87195-124-3.
- Funk, Arville L (1967). Hoosiers in the Civil War. Adams Press. ISBN 978-0-9623292-5-8.
- Gray, Ralph D (1977). Gentlemen from Indiana: National Party Candidates,1836–1940. Indiana Historical Bureau. ISBN 978-1-885323-29-3.
- Gray, Ralph D (1995). Indiana History: A Book of Readings. Indiana University Press. ISBN 978-0-253-32629-4.
- Indiana State Chamber of Commerce (2005). Here is Your Indiana Government.
- Indiana State Chamber of Commerce (2007). Here is Your Indiana Government.
- Indiana Writer's Project (1973) [1937]. Indiana: A Guide To The Hoosier State. American Guide Series.
- Jackson, Marion T., ed. (1997). The Natural Heritage of Indiana. Bloomington: Indiana University Press. ISBN 978-0-253-33074-1.
- Logan, William Newton; Cumings, Edgar Roscoe; Malott, Clyde Arnett; Visher, Stephen Sargent; Tucker, William Motier; Reeves, John Robert (1922). Handbook of Indiana Geology. William B. Burford.
- Madison, James H. Hoosiers: A New History of Indiana. Bloomington, IN: Indiana University Press, 2014.
- Madison, James H. (1990). The Indiana Way: A State History. Bloomington and Indianapolis: Indiana University Press and Indiana Historical Society. ISBN 978-0-253-20609-1.
- Moore, Edward E (1910). A Century of Indiana. American Book Company.
- Pell, ed. (2003). Indiana. Capstone Press. ISBN 978-0-7368-1582-6.
- Skertic, Mark; Watkins, John J. (2003). A Native's Guide to Northwest Indiana.
- Taylor, Robert M., ed. (1990). Indiana: A New Historical Guide. Indianapolis: Indiana Historical Society. ISBN 978-0-87195-048-2.
- Taylor, Robert M., ed. (2001). The State of Indiana History 2000: Papers Presented at the Indiana Historical Society's Grand Opening. Indianapolis: Indiana Historical Society.

Preceded by Louisiana	List of U.S. states by date of admission to the Union; Admitted on December 11, 1816 (19th)	Succeeded by Mississippi
