= Betty Plant =

New Zealand netball player

Betty Plant QSM
Personal information
- Full name: Betty Alice Plant
- Born: 11 January 1920 Wellington, New Zealand
- Died: 15 November 2002 (aged 82) Wellington, New Zealand
- Occupation: Clerk
- Height: 1.68 m (5 ft 6 in)
- School: Wellington Girls' College

Netball career
- Playing position: C
Years	National team	Caps
1948	New Zealand	1

Betty Alice Plant QSM (11 January 1920 – 15 November 2002) was a New Zealand netball player. She played as centre and was captain of the New Zealand team in the third Test against the touring Australian team in 1948. She was later active in netball administration and Guiding, and was closely involved in saving Old St Paul's, Wellington, from demolition in the 1960s. In 1979, she became verger of St Paul's Cathedral, Wellington, the first woman to be appointed to the role.

== Early life ==
Born in Wellington on 11 January 1920, Plant was the daughter of Thomas Plant, who worked in the silk trade, and Daisy Plant (née Wickins). She was educated at Wellington Girls' College, and then spent three years working in London as a clerk at Burroughs Wellcome. Returning to Wellington in 1939, she spent the next 30 years working as a clerk and secretary for engineering company James Niven Limited.

== Sporting career ==
=== Netball ===
==== Player ====
Plant was a member of the Wellington provincial netball team, and in 1948 she was selected as captain of the New Zealand team to play the visiting Australian team in the third Test in Auckland. The match was won by Australia, 44–22.

==== Administrator and coach ====
Plant served as treasurer of the Wellington Basketball (Netball) Association from 1947 to 1953, and of the New Zealand Netball Association from 1969 to 1979. From 1975 to 1979, she was treasurer of the International Federation of Netball Associations. She was a member of the organising committee for the 1975 World Netball Tournament, held in Auckland.

In 1959, Plant was the coach, selector and manager of the Wellington representative netball team.

Plant received a service award from the Wellington Netball Association in 1979, and in 1981 she was given a similar award by the New Zealand Netball Association.

=== Tennis ===
In 1955, Plant played representative tennis for Wellington.

== Girl Guides ==
Plant was involved with the Girl Guides movement in Wellington for over 60 years. Between 1939 and 1969, when the unit disbanded, she was captain of the St Paul's Cathedral (Old St Paul's) Guide company. As there were more girls wanting to participate than were permitted to be in a unit, Plant circumvented the regulations by running two units, which met at the same time and place each week, and organised the units' annual camp. In 1965, she was awarded the Silver Oak Leaf, for services to Guiding.

== Anglican Church ==
=== Old St Paul's ===
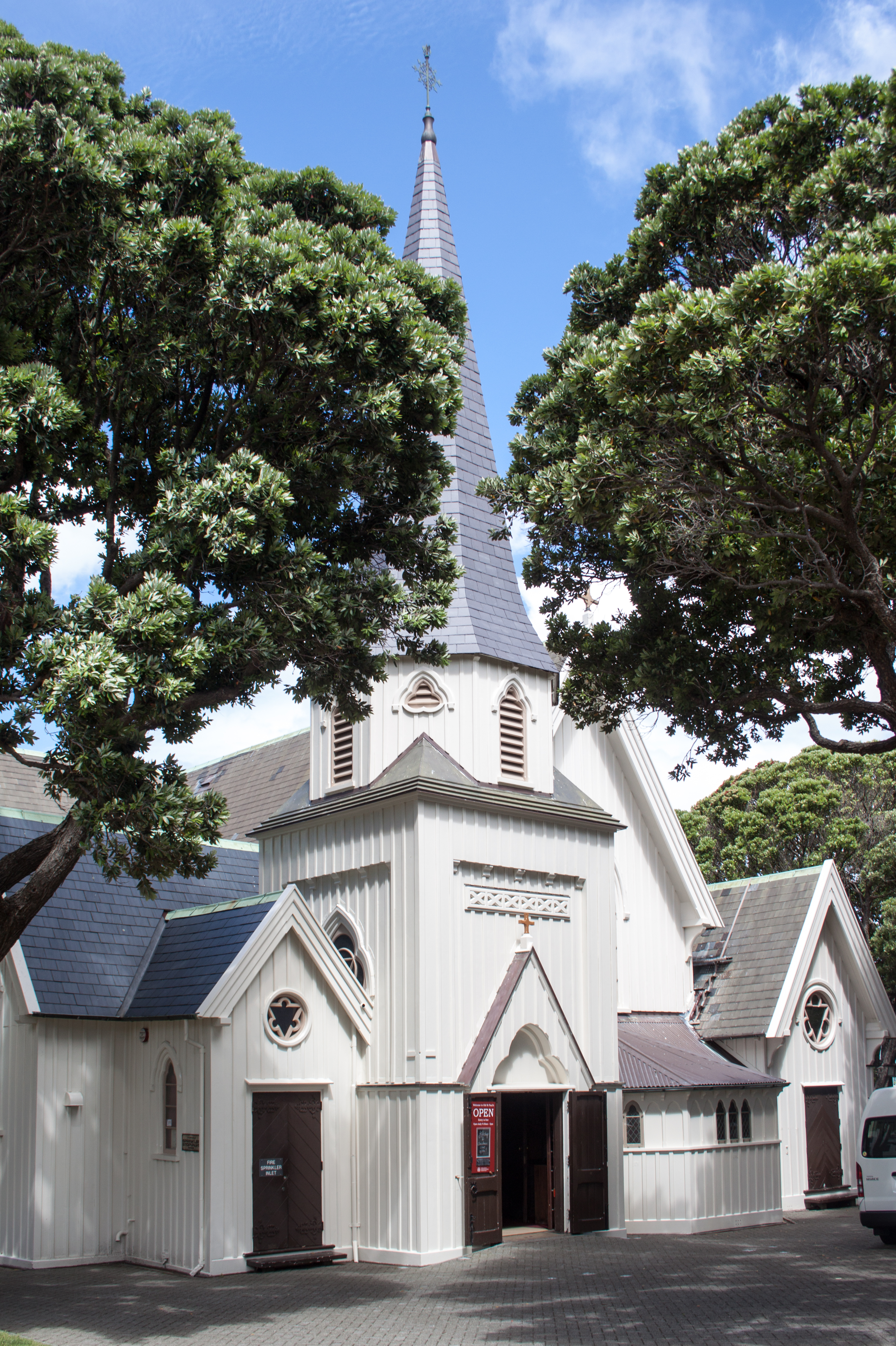
Old St Paul's, Wellington

As a child, Plant worshipped at Old St Paul's in Wellington, but it was in the 1950s that she became intimately involved in the campaign to save the building from demolition when the Diocese of Wellington announced the construction of the new St Paul's Cathedral nearby. Over a period of 10 years, Plant was vocal in her opposition to the old church's destruction. The campaign was ultimately successful, with the New Zealand government purchasing Old St Paul's in 1967; the building was subsequently restored by the Ministry of Works.

Plant was appointed as curator of Old St Paul's by the Historic Places Trust (now Heritage New Zealand) in 1969, and undertook the role for 11 years. Her knowledge of the building was said to be "encyclopaedic", and she gave tours to visitors as well as cleaning the church, in what she described as a "labour of love".

In the 1980 Queen's Birthday Honours, Plant was awarded the Queen's Service Medal for public services., She received a Wellington City Council civic award in 1988, and in 2002 she was made a life member of the Friends of Old St Paul's Society.

=== St Paul's Cathedral ===
Although her campaign to save Old St Paul's had placed her in opposition to the church hierarchy, Plant was appointed verger of the new St Paul's Cathedral by the dean of the cathedral, Jim Thomas, in 1979. Thomas recognised that Plant was able to undertake the many duties required of the verger quickly and efficiently, and that she was knowledgeable in church ritual. Plant was the first female verger in Wellington, and it is thought that she may have been the first female cathedral verger in the worldwide Anglican Communion. She retired from the role in 1987.

=== All Saints' Church, Ngaio ===
Plant was a liturgist at All Saints' Church in the Wellington suburb of Ngaio from 1990 until her death in 2002.

== Death ==
Plant died in Wellington on 15 November 2002.
