= Digby Wilkinson =

Digby Wilkinson is a New Zealand priest. He served as dean of Wellington Cathedral of St Paul from 2013 to 2018. Since February 2018, he has been the vicar of the Tawa Anglican Church in Wellington.

The New Zealand Herald published an article about his past convictions while he was the pastor of the Otumoetai Baptist Church (part of the Baptist Churches of New Zealand):
"A Baptist pastor who is about to become Wellington's new Dean of the Anglican church comes with a chequered past, including convictions for fraud and burglary of a parishioner's house - all while he was a Bay of Plenty pastor."

Anglican Communion titles
Preceded by Frank Nelson	Dean of Wellington Cathedral of St Paul; 2013–2018	Succeeded by David Rowe
