= Molesworth Street, Wellington =

Street in Thorndon, New Zealand

Coordinates: 41.275182°S 174.777848°E

Molesworth Street
- Interactive map of Molesworth Street
- Maintained by: Wellington City Council
- Length: 800 m (2,600 ft)
- Location: Thorndon, Wellington, New Zealand
- South end: Lambton Quay/Bunny Street
- North end: Tinakori Road/Park Street

Molesworth Street is located at the north end of the central business district of Wellington, the capital city of New Zealand. Leading from the northern end of Lambton Quay, central Wellington's main street, it is a northbound one-way street linking the CBD with Thorndon, Tinakori Road and the Wellington Urban Motorway north out of the city. The street was named for Sir William Molesworth, 8th Baronet, a prominent member of the New Zealand Company. There is another Molesworth Street in the Wellington metropolitan area, located in the Lower Hutt suburb of Taitā.

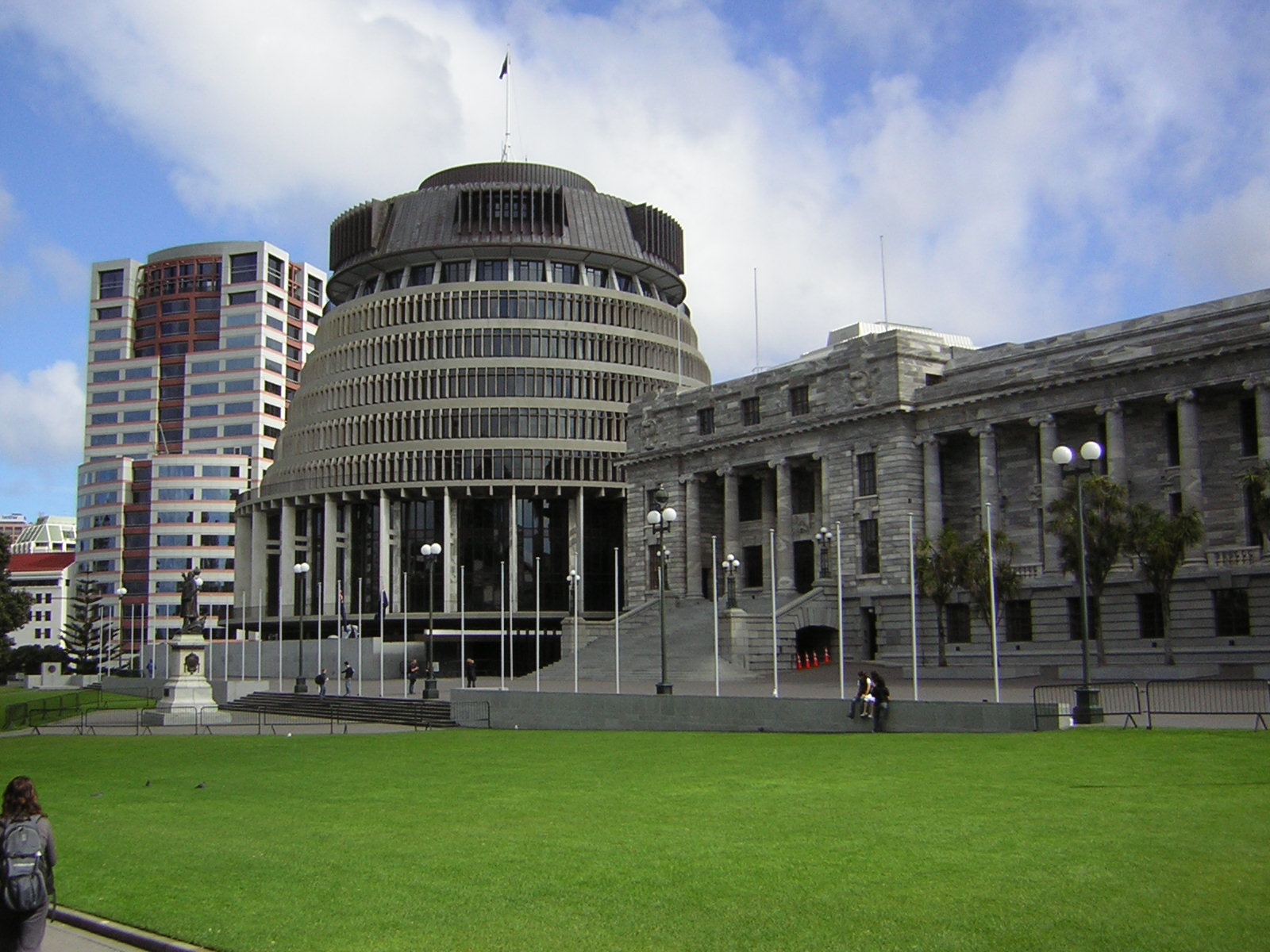
The Beehive and Parliament Building

Many of New Zealand's main governmental and archival institutions are located on Molesworth Street, most notably New Zealand Parliament Buildings, which are located at the street's southern end. The iconic Beehive is a major landmark close to the street's junction with Lambton Quay and Bowen Street. The New Zealand High Court and Court of Appeal are also located on Molesworth Street. Other prominent buildings on Molesworth Street include St Paul's Cathedral and the National Library of New Zealand. The street is also home to several embassies and apartment blocks.

As the centre of political activity in New Zealand, Molesworth Street has been the site of many important events in New Zealand's history, including a large number of political protests. Prominent among these protests were those against the 1981 South African rugby tour, where on 29 July 1981, for the first time in New Zealand, police batonned political protesters, and the 2022 protest and occupation of Parliament grounds during the COVID-19 pandemic.

== Wai-titi Landing ==
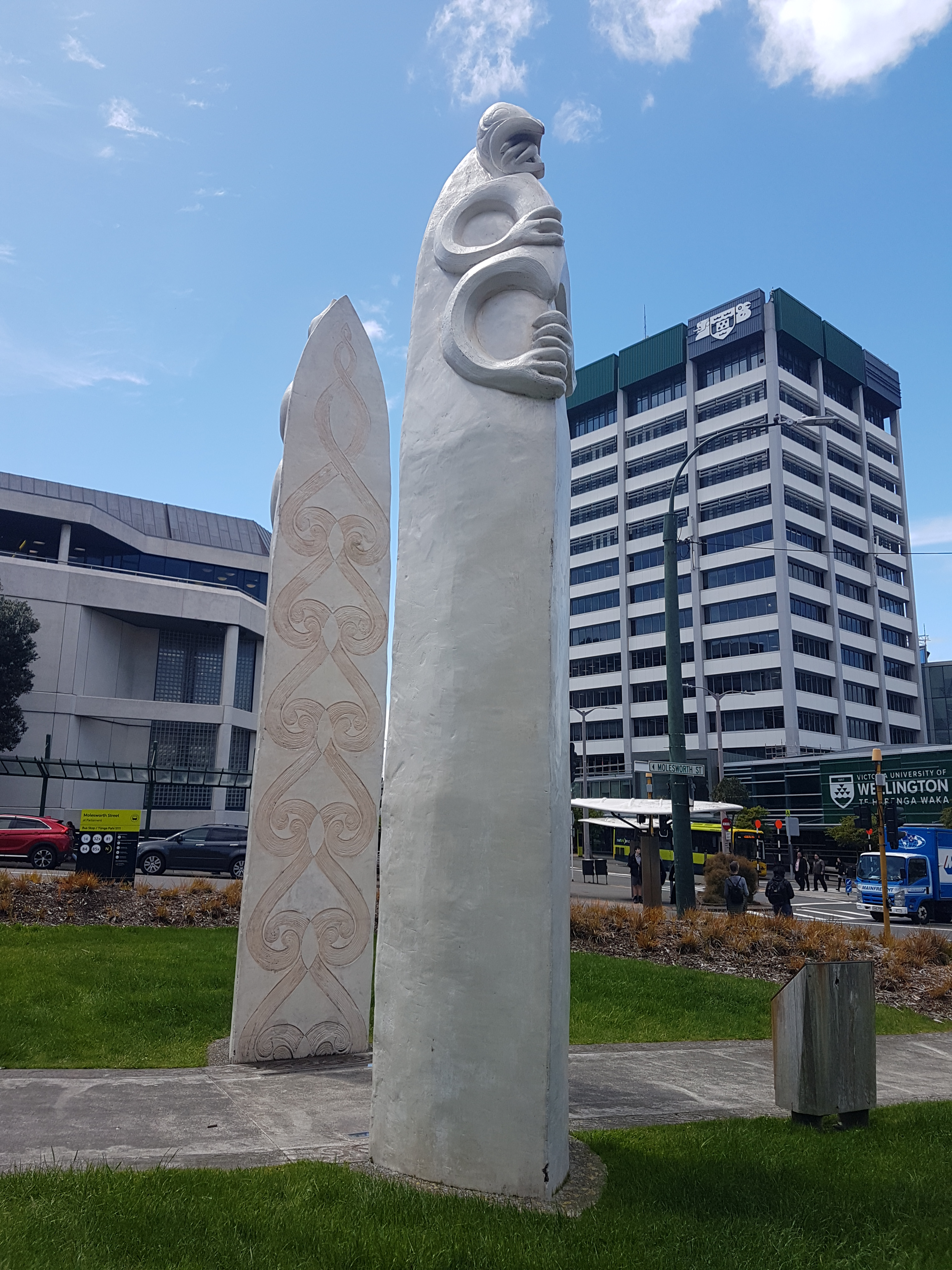
Pouwhenua by Ra Vincent at Wai-titi Landing

At the southern end of Molesworth Street at its intersection with Lambton Quay, just outside the parliamentary precinct, stand two pouwhenua in a small planted area. In pre-European times the site was on the shoreline and was a landing place for canoes (waka). The name Wai-titi refers to a small stream which ran between Kumutoto Pā and Pipitea Pā. The sculpture was designed by Ra Vincent and gifted to Wellington by the Wellington Tenths Trust to represent partnership between the city and the Te Āti Awa tribe which came to Wellington from Taranaki in the nineteenth century. Wellington City Council paid $200,000 towards the project. The two pouwhenua are 6.3 m high and made of white cement and marble. They represent waka prows: traditionally waka were placed upright in the ground at the end of a journey. Carved onto the pouwhenua are figures representing the people of the land and a kōwhai design representing the spirit of the land. The sculptures and parklet were officially opened on 13 December 2004 by the then Prime Minister Helen Clark, Wellington Mayor Kerry Prendergast and Tenths Trust representatives.

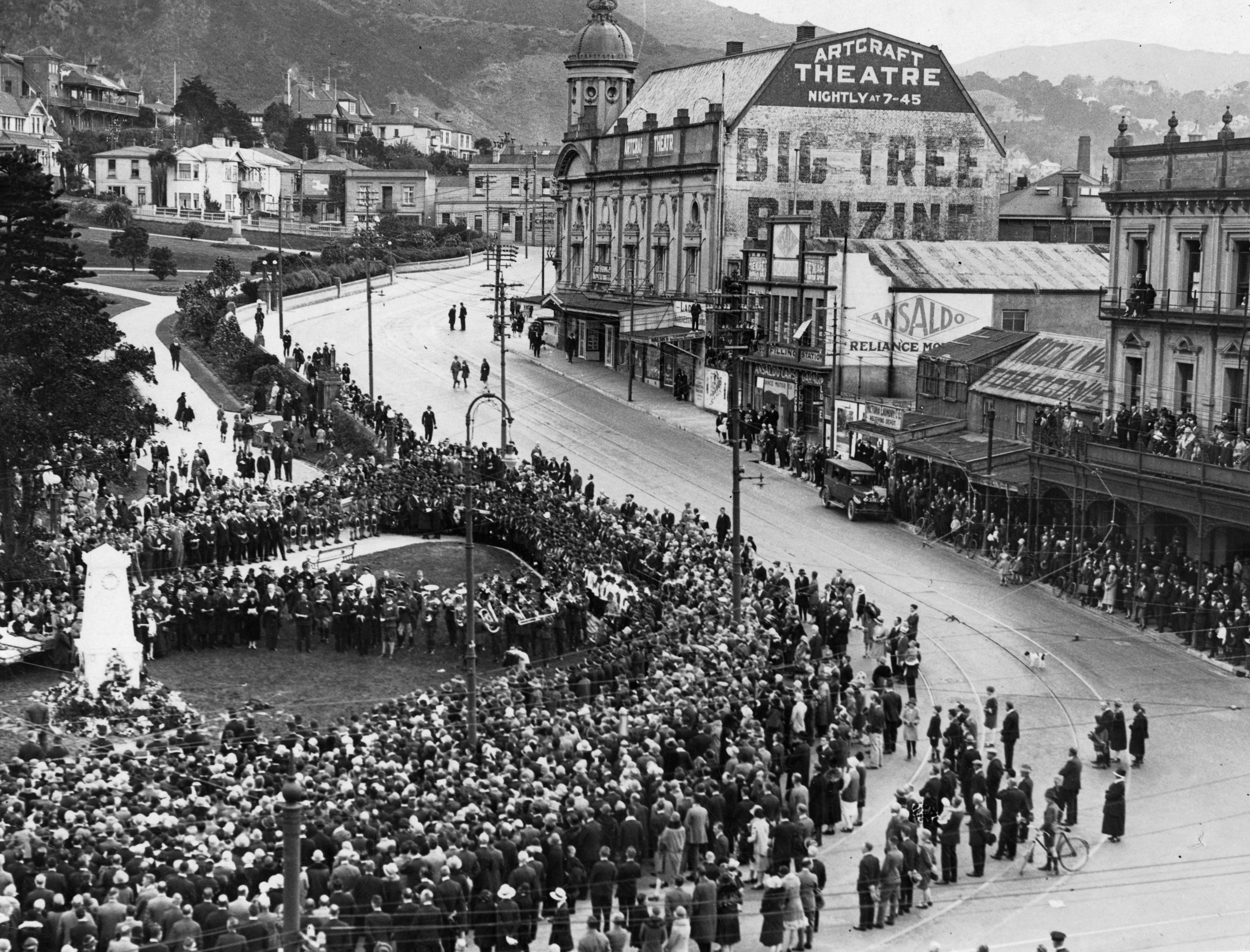
Crowds at a ceremony at the temporary cenotaph at the foot of Molesworth Street, 1928.

=== Temporary cenotaph ===
In the 1920s the triangular piece of land at the lower end of Molesworth Street now called Wai-titi Landing was the site of a temporary cenotaph in memory of soldiers killed in World War 1. The cenotaph in the form of an obelisk in wood and plaster was erected in 1920 by the RSA. Construction of a permanent cenotaph nearby at the intersection of Lambton Quay and Bowen Street began in 1929. It was dedicated in 1932 and in 1982 was listed as a Historic Place Category 1 by Heritage New Zealand.

== Parliamentary precinct ==
New Zealand's Parliament Buildings are on a site at the southern end of Molesworth Street, bounded by Lambton Quay, Bowen Street and Hill Street. The location was set aside as a government centre by William Mein Smith, Surveyor General for the New Zealand Company, in his 1840 plan of Wellington. William Wakefield built a house on the land then sold it to the Governor, and the first Wellington Provincial Council buildings were built on this site in 1857. After New Zealand's capital was shifted from Auckland to Wellington in 1865, a Parliament House was built in 1873. It burned down in 1907.

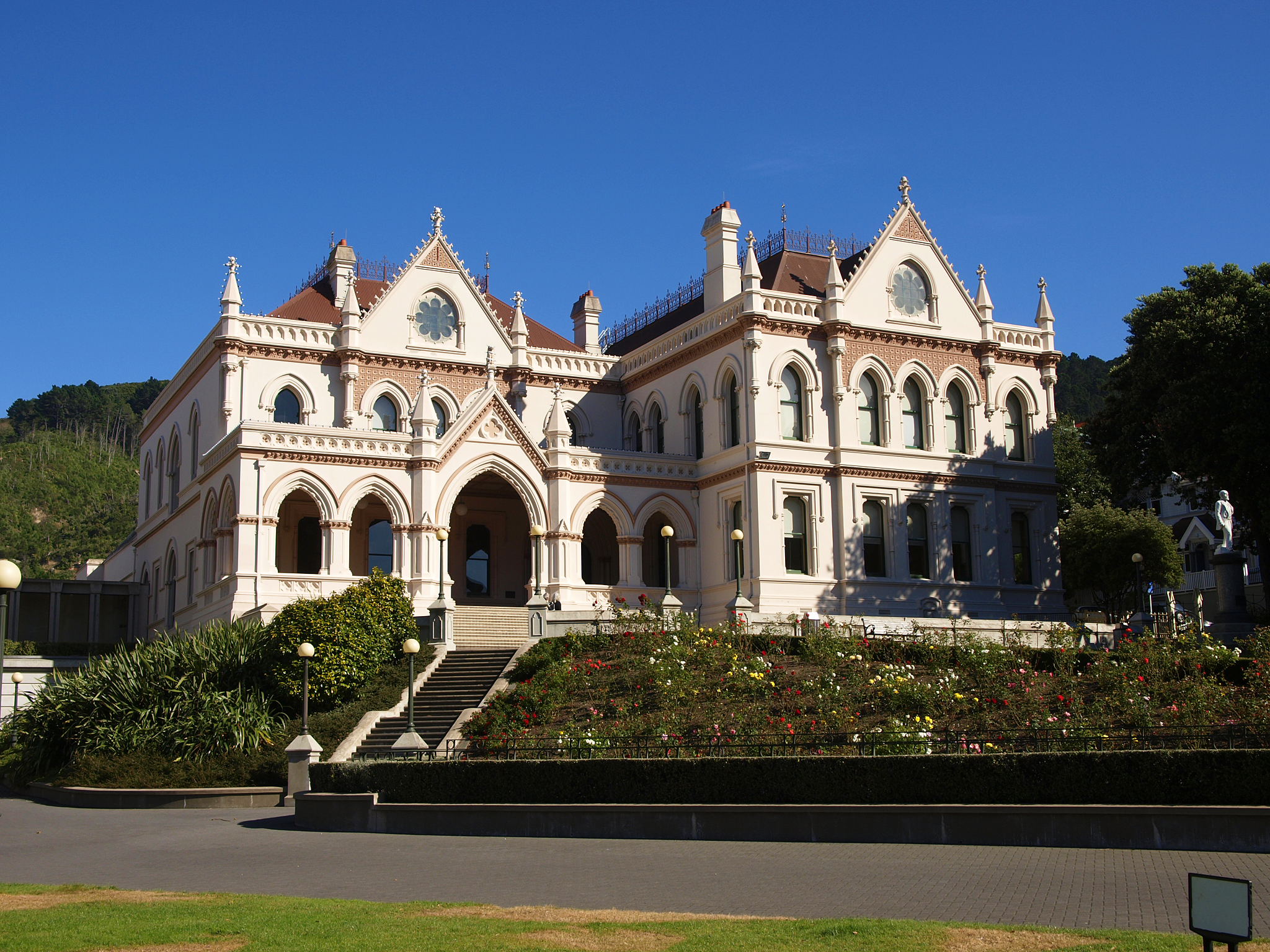
Parliamentary Library

The oldest extant building on the site is the Parliamentary Library, which was designed by Thomas Turnbull in Victorian Gothic style. It was constructed in two stages: the west wing at the rear in 1883 and the front section in 1899. The building has been used as a library since 1901, when it was known as the General Assembly Library. The current Parliament Building was completed in 1922 after the original parliament building was destroyed by fire in 1907. The new building was supposed to have a second wing to the south of the entrance, to match the existing wing, but this was never built. Instead, a new building for the executive wing of parliament was built after a 1964 concept by Sir Basil Spence, The new building was nicknamed 'The Beehive' for its shape – a round, ten-storey high building on a podium. The Beehive was officially opened by Queen Elizabeth II on 28 February 1977 although it was not completed and fully occupied until 1979.

Landscaped grounds surround the parliamentary buildings and are open to the public. The grounds contain several statues including a bronze statue of Richard Seddon, New Zealand's longest-serving prime minister, on the main forecourt. The forecourt and grounds in front of Parliament have been the location of many political protests.

=== 1981 'Battle of Molesworth Street' ===
On 29 July 1981, people protesting the South African Springbok rugby tour of New Zealand intended to march up Molesworth Street to the home of the South African Consul in Wadestown. The 1500-strong crowd gathered in the grounds of Parliament then began to march up the street, but the marchers were stopped by police, who began striking them with batons. Anti-tour activists later claimed that protesters were "savagely attacked by police", and that "police provoked violence", while police riot squad officer Ross Meurant said that there were protesters who intended to inflict "serious injury or disfigurement" on the police. After this event many tour protesters began to wear motorcycle or bicycle helmets to protect themselves from batons and head injury. The event became known as 'The Battle of Molesworth Street'.

=== 2022 protest and occupation ===
During February and March 2022, the grounds of Parliament and neighbouring streets were the site of a large protest by people angry at the New Zealand government's response to the COVID-19 pandemic. Thousands of protestors camped in front of the Parliament Building and blocked streets and the bus interchange nearby. The 23-day occupation of Parliament's grounds cost almost $800,000 in management, clean up and recovery and the grounds were closed to the public for four months while the area was rehabilitated.

=== 2024 Treaty march ===
In November 2024 there were nationwide protests about a government bill introduced by David Seymour of the ACT New Zealand party. It aimed to define the principles of the Treaty of Waitangi and put them to a nationwide referendum for confirmation. Police estimates say that about 42,000 people marched on Parliament on 19 November, including some on horseback. Molesworth Street, Bowen Street and Lambton Quay were closed during the march and gathering at Parliament.

== High Court ==
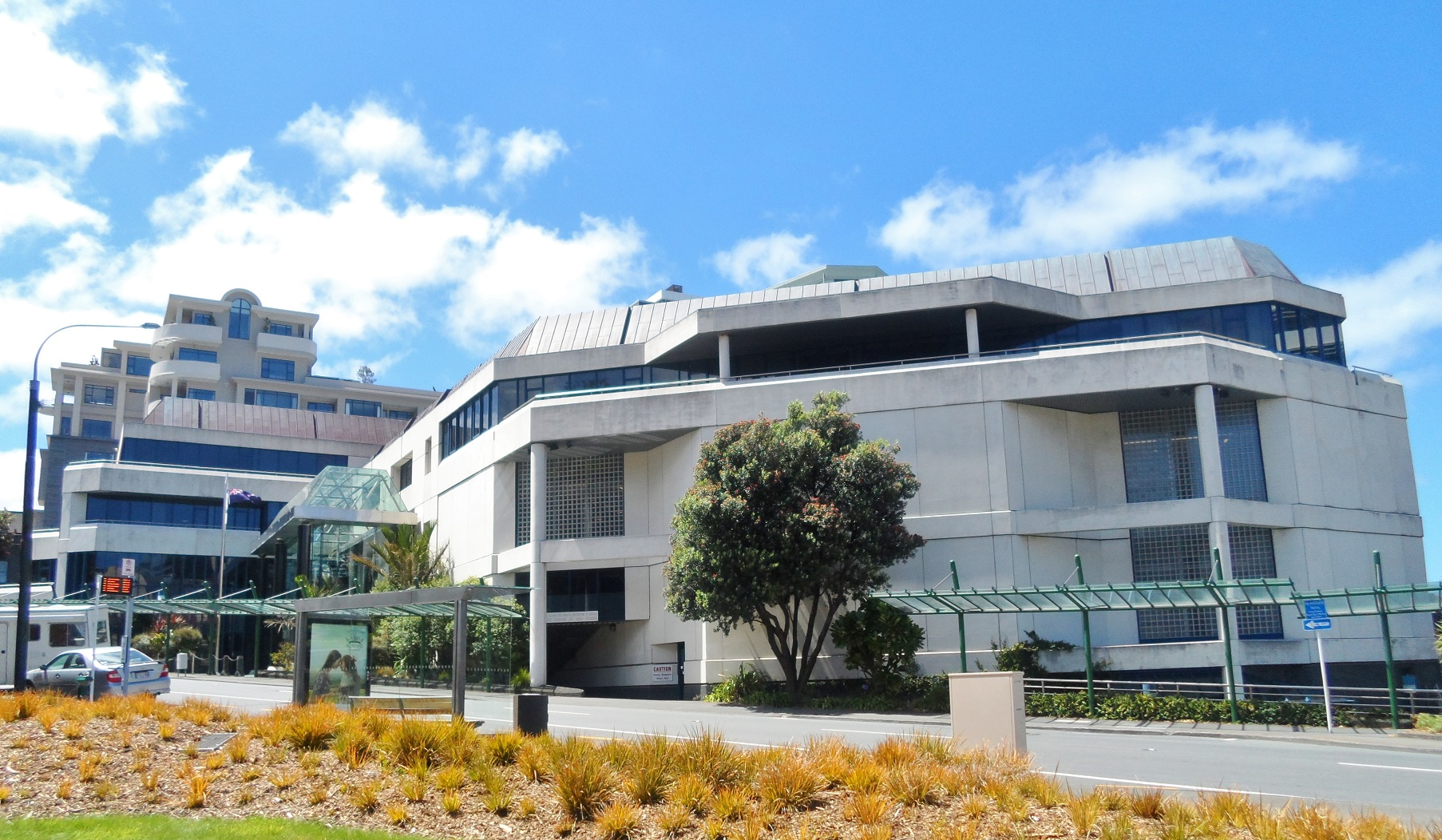
High Court

The High Court is situated at 2 Molesworth Street, opposite Parliament, while the Court of Appeal is further up the street opposite the Parliamentary Library.

The High Court building was completed around 1992 to replace a Victorian-era building in Ballance Street. A number of artworks were commissioned for the new building, including 'Suspended Sculpture' by Neil Dawson which is installed above the main entry atrium and visible from the street. The sculpture of large feathers reflected on rippling 'water' represents the site before humans arrived.

The building was closed for several months after suffering water damage in the 2016 Kaikōura earthquake, reopening on 1 February 2017. It was declared structurally sound at that time, but in October 2024 the Ministry of Justice announced that $20 million of earthquake strengthening was needed.

== Backbencher ==
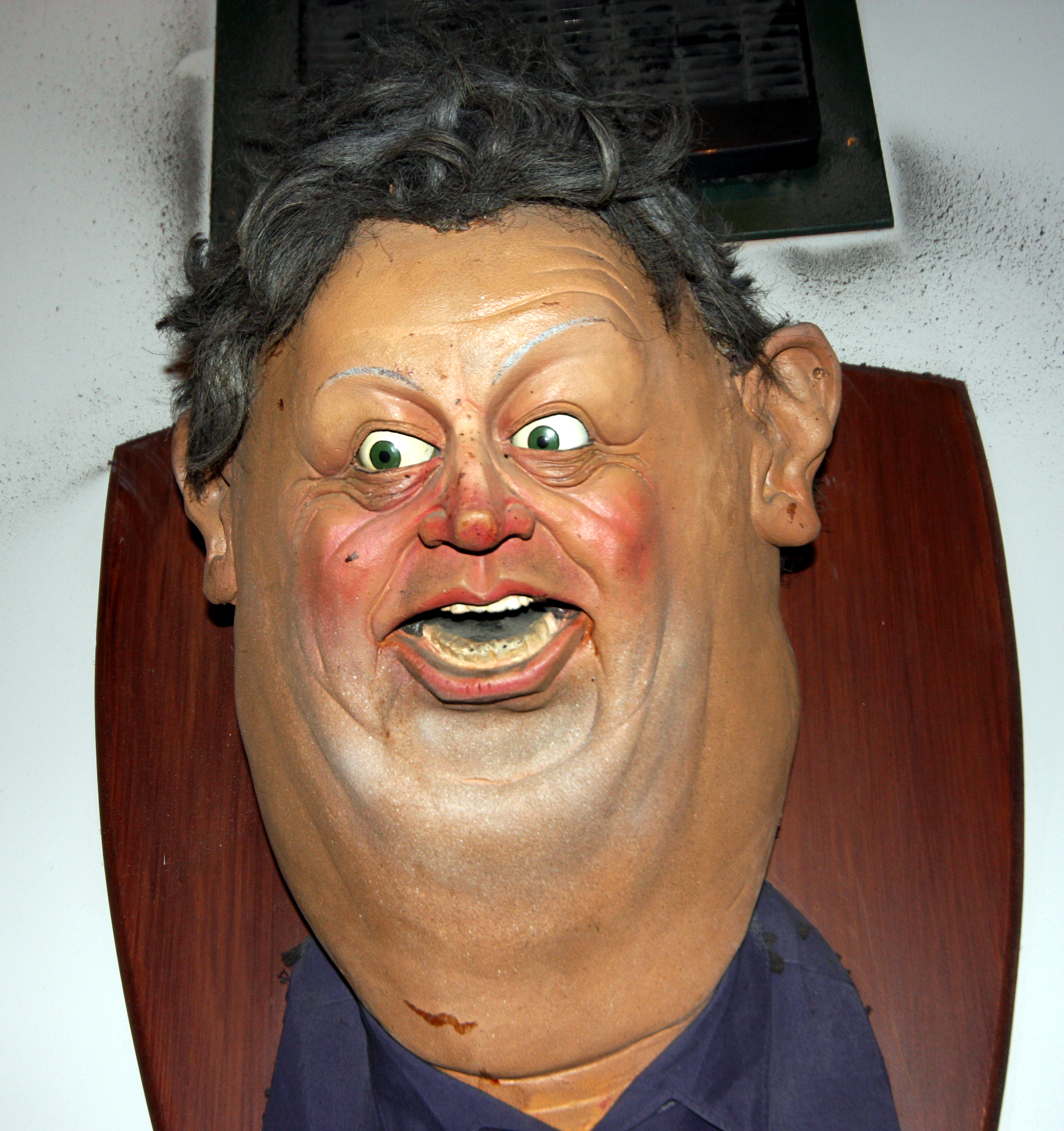
Puppet of Prime Minister David Lange at the Backbencher pub

The Backbencher is a pub at 34 Molesworth Street, on the corner of Kate Sheppard Place, built in two stages in 1912 and 1917. A wooden hotel was built on this site in 1869, with a concrete and brick extension built in 1912. The wooden section of the pub burned down in 1917 and was replaced with a brick section. The building is notable as one of Wellington's oldest masonry hotels, with its external appearance changed little since it was built. The pub has strong associations with Parliament which is just across the street. Politicians and parliamentary staff were known to gather at the pub between debates in the House. In 1990–1991 the pub was refurbished and opened as 'The Backbencher'. The walls were decorated with political cartoons and a collection of bigger-than-life-size puppets of politicians and public figures, some of which had been used on a satirical television show, 'Private Eye'. After a fire in 2012, some of the puppets were removed from the pub.

== Kate Sheppard Apartments ==
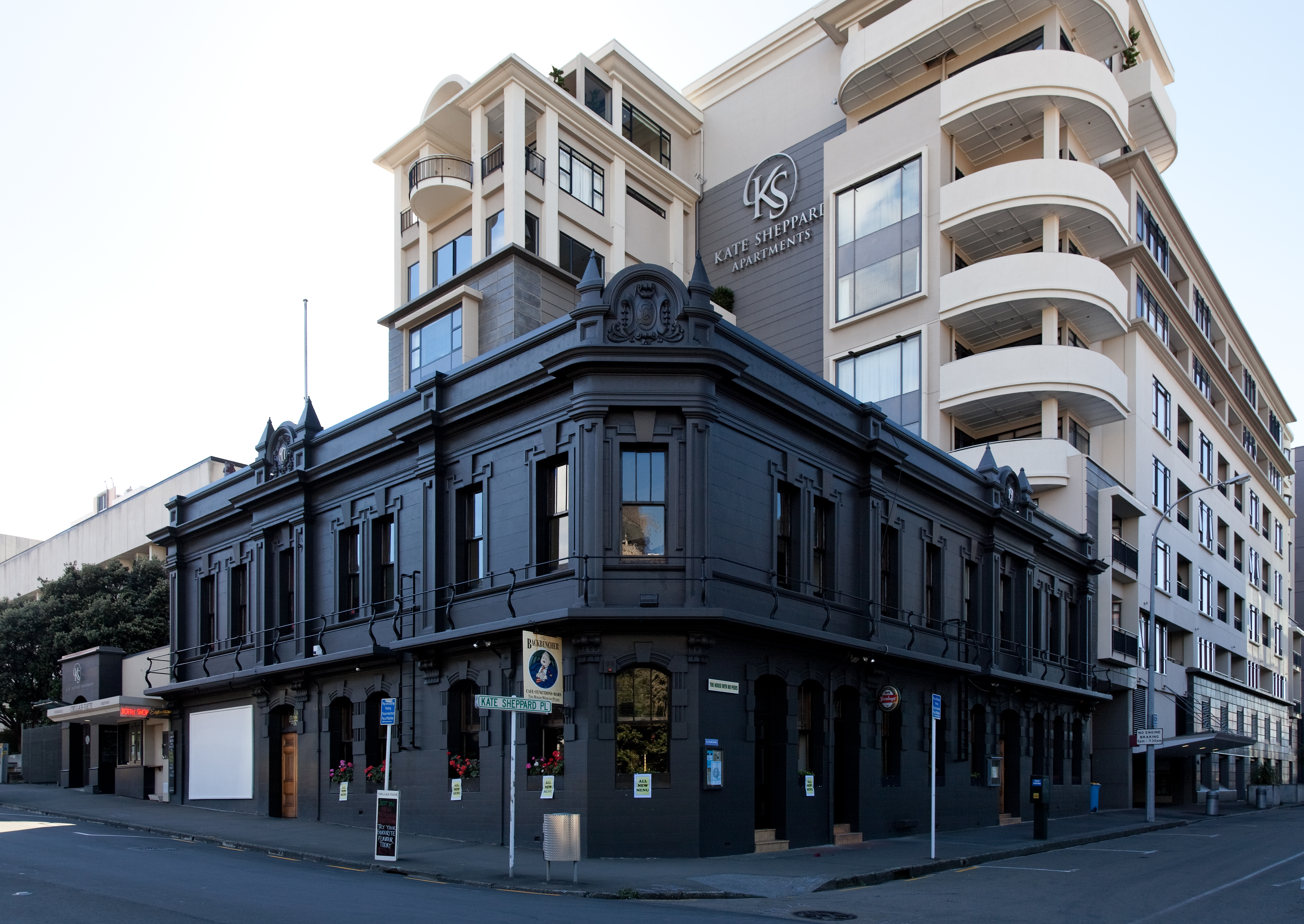
The Backbencher pub, in front of the Kate Sheppard Apartments

Kate Sheppard Apartments is a 10 storey apartment complex at 42 Molesworth Street, next to the Backbencher. The site formerly held a carpark and a fish and chip shop (Molesworth Fish Supply) notable for being popular with parliamentary staff and members of Parliament. The complex was designed by architects Hunt Davies Tennant, and built by Holmes Construction in 2004. It won the Master Builders Commercial Award for 2005. The complex contains 64 luxury apartments, including a 375 square metre penthouse, with two floors used for 57 carparks. The building's main entrance is via a gated entry and passageway on Molesworth Street, with vehicle access and the main façade around the corner on Kate Sheppard Place. The building effectively wraps around the Backbencher on its corner site. Air rights over the Backbencher pub were purchased for $1 million so that the view from the apartments would never be obscured.

The building remained structurally sound after the 2016 Kaikōura earthquake but suffered surface cracking to paint, gib and tiles in the interior. All the windows and balcony doors were replaced as external cracking around windows meant they were possibly not watertight. The total cost of repairs was $16 million.

== Court of Appeal ==
The Court of Appeal at 54 Molesworth Street was completed in 1980. It sits across Aitken Street from the National Library of New Zealand and is built in a similar style. According to a newspaper report at the time, the aim of the design was "a building which was unostentatious yet in good taste —a professional building for judges and lawyers rather than a public one; and one which would provide the best possible working conditions". The building features generous use of space 'to heighten the dignity of the building and the seriousness of its purpose".

== National Library of New Zealand ==
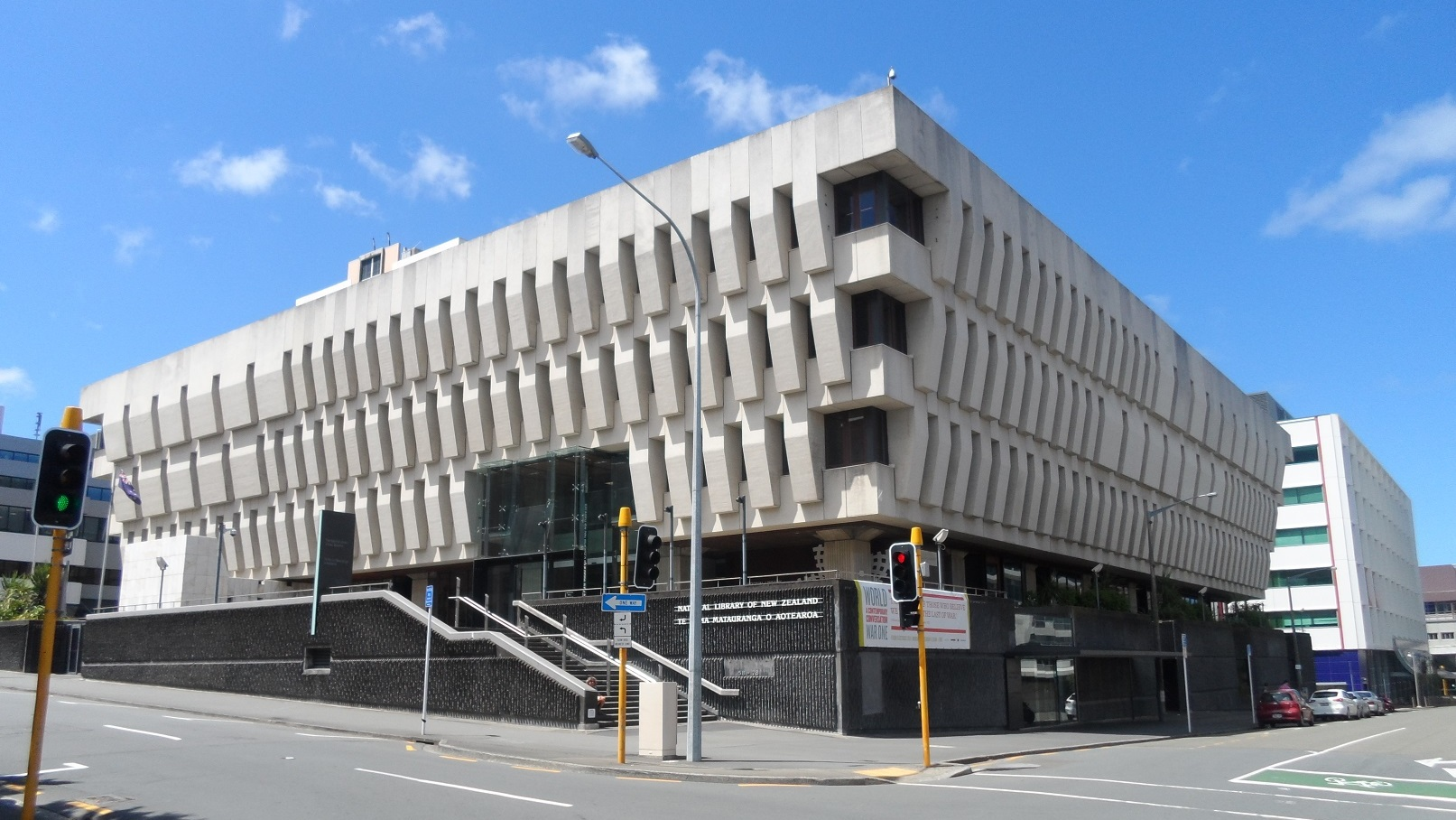
The National Library

The National Library building at 70 Molesworth Street was modelled on the controversial 1962 Boston City Hall. It is designed in a Brutalist style, with narrow windows to protect the interior from too much heat and sunlight which might damage the collections. The building was originally designed in steel but was redesigned in concrete due to worries about industrial action by the Boilermakers' Union which was involved in several disputes in the 1970s. The foundations were completed in 1976 but then work stopped for six years. In all, it took 17 years to construct the building, which was completed in 1987. Two underground levels extend into the space below the building next door.

Services provided by the National Library include a reference collection of published material relevant to researchers, Legal Deposit (collecting everything published in New Zealand), Services to Schools and Ngā Taonga Sound & Vision. The Turnbull Library collects unpublished material and is housed within the National Library.

In 2013 the library rearranged the interior layout, creating a large open space, meeting rooms and a new café on the ground floor. In 2017 a permanent exhibition named He Tohu opened. The exhibition displays three important documents: He Whakaputanga, the 1835 Declaration of Independence of the United Tribes of the New Zealand; the 1840 Treaty of Waitangi; and the 1893 Women’s Suffrage Petition.

From 1 July 2025, a new operational structure was established. This will see the National Library and Archives New Zealand (which collects and preserves material produced by the government) operating together under the joint leadership of the National Librarian and Chief Archivist. Services will be moved to a new building in Mulgrave Street on the site of Defence House which was demolished after suffering damage in the Kaikōura earthquake.

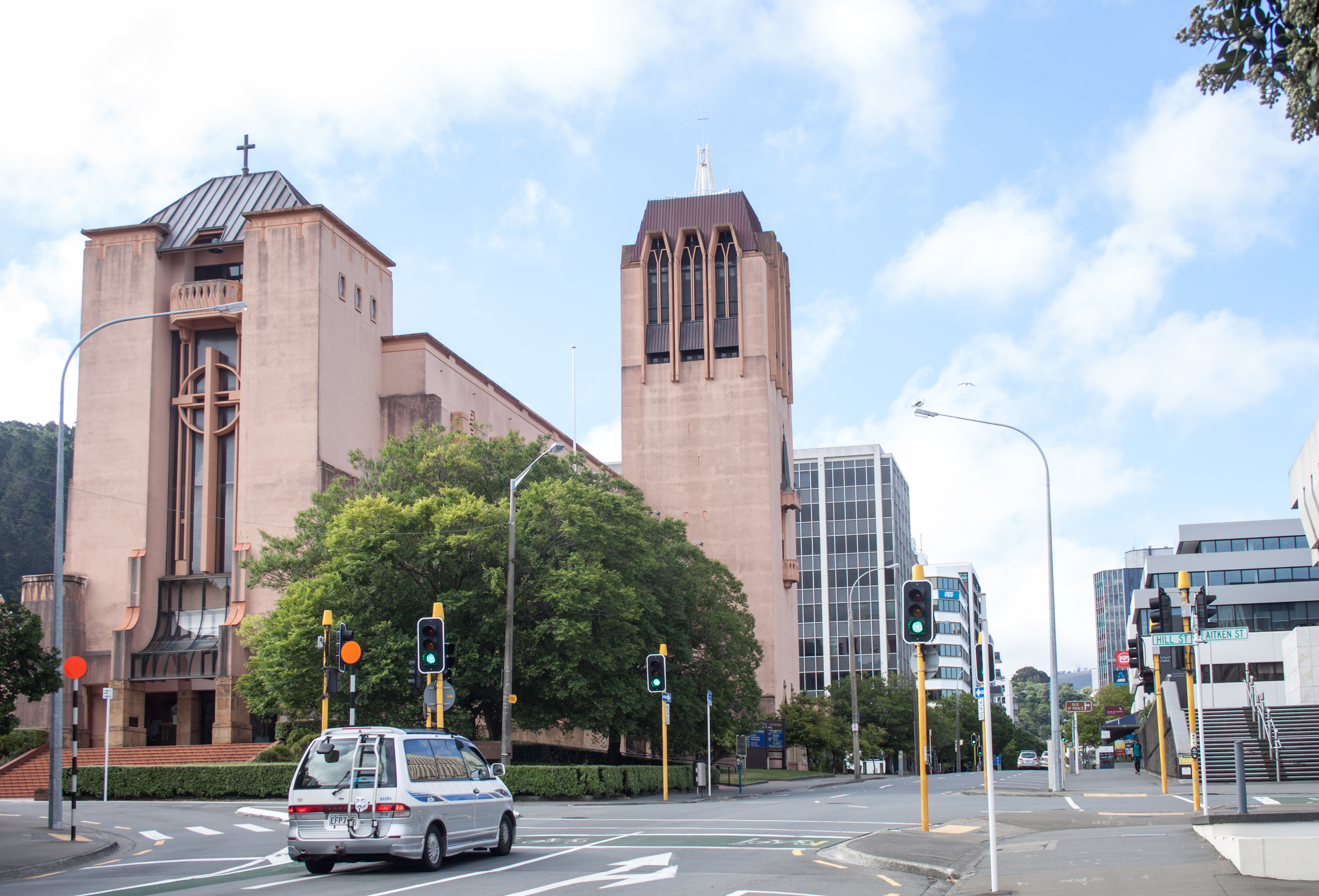
St Paul's Cathedral seen from Molesworth Street

== St Paul's Cathedral ==
St Paul's Cathedral (formally, the Wellington Cathedral of St Paul) is an Anglican cathedral church on the corner of Hill Street and Molesworth Street, with its main entrance in Hill Street. As well as being a popular attraction, St Paul's Cathedral is a working church with daily services. The cathedral, as the largest church in Wellington, also plays a role in many state occasions.

The building was designed in 1938 by New Zealand architect Cecil Wood, and construction began in 1954. Due to a lack of funds, only the nave and base of the bell tower were built at first. The building began to be used as an Anglican cathedral in 1964 (replacing Old St Paul's in Mulgrave Street). In 1970-1972 the nave was extended by 17.6 m to create two and half more bays, and in 1984 the bell tower was added. It contains 14 bells, one of which weighs 1 ¾ tonnes. In 1992 the Diocesan Synod decided to raise funds to complete the cathedral. Three more bays were added to the nave and a new porch, gallery and offices were built. The temporary wall of the building facing Parliament was replaced by a glazed wall with an 11-metre high cross. The completed cathedral was dedicated in 1998 and consecrated in 2001.

== 61 Molesworth Street ==
A curtain-walled office building knowns as ICI House (and later as Deloitte House) was built at 61 Molesworth Street in the early 1960s. It was notable as an example of modernist architecture and was one of the first buildings in Wellington to have air conditioning. The building was demolished after being damaged in the 2016 Kaikōura earthquake.

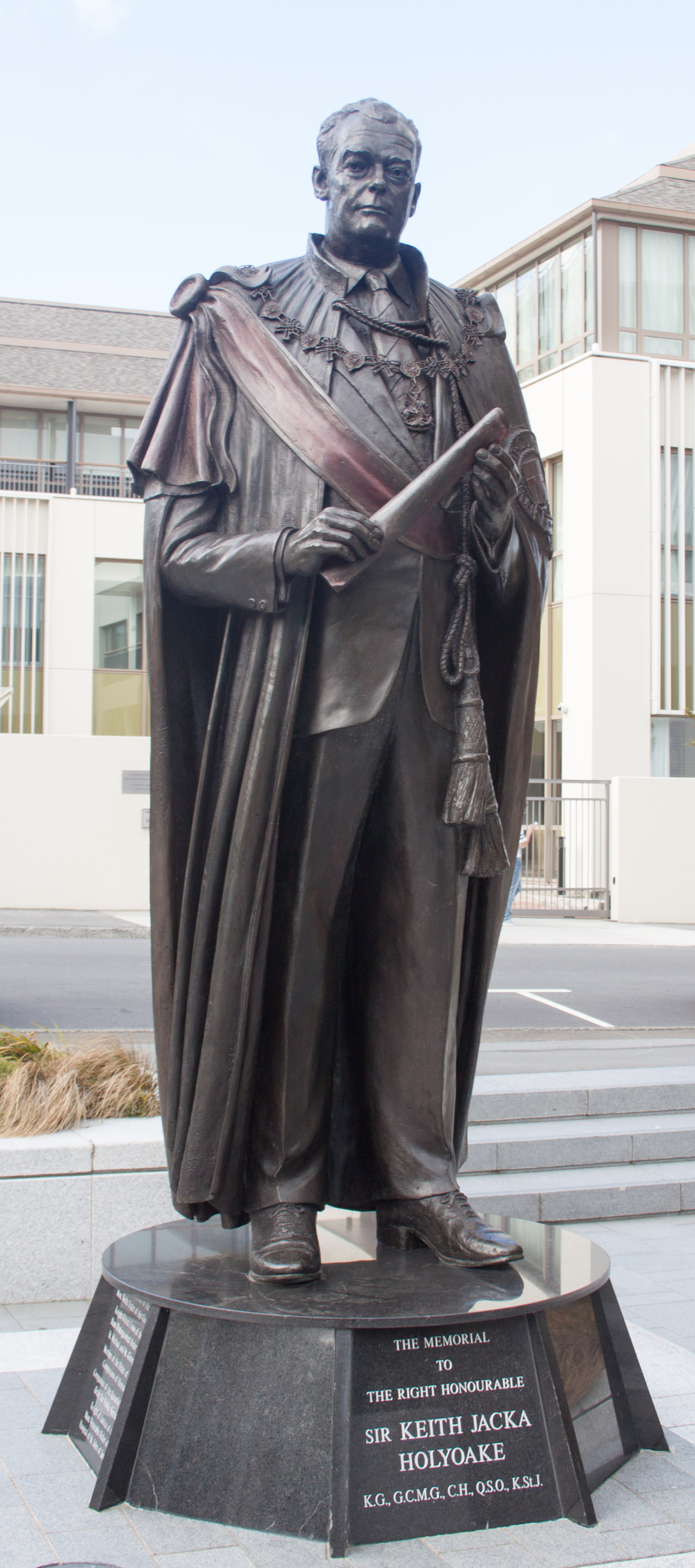
Statue of Sir Keith Holyoake

== State Services Commission Building ==
The building at 100 Molesworth Street formerly housed the State Services Commission (renamed the Public Service Commission in 2020). Two levels underground for document storage extend from the neighbouring National Library. The building won a New Zealand Institute of Architects Wellington Branch award in 1988. In 2012 the State Services Commission moved out of the building to the Reserve Bank building on the Terrace.

The ground floor of the building features a courtyard and shops, and there is a statue of former Prime Minister Sir Keith Holyoake. The 2.5 metre-high bronze statue was unveiled in 1990. The statue faces south towards Parliament, but the Holyoake family believed it should have been installed in the grounds of Parliament, since Holyoake was a prominent politician but had no connection with the State Services Commission. The statue was mistakenly sold along with the building and is no longer owned by the government.

== Brew tower and supermarket ==
In 1866 Staples Brewery was established at 142-148 Molesworth Street on a site extending across to Murphy Street. The brewery expanded and ownership changed several times. By the 1980s the brewery was owned by Lion Breweries, who built the Lion Tavern on the corner of Molesworth St and Little Pipitea St in 1972 and had their headquarters in Murphy Street. Production at the brewery ceased in 1988, and its buildings were demolished in 1989. The only remnant of the brewery is the brick brew tower designed by William Turnbull, which was built in 1915 and in use until 1998. The tower has a Historic Place Category 1 listing from Heritage New Zealand, which states it is a prominent feature in the neighbourhood and notable as "an important example of an industrial building designed specifically to provide for the demanding requirements of a major brewery." The tower has architectural details which make it "aesthetically pleasing".

In November 1998 a New World supermarket opened on the site. Architect Roger Walker was inspired to use the brew tower as the entrance to the supermarket, stating "I wanted to create a dramatic entrance way which was both a gateway to the store and a place to meet people. In medieval times, people would always gather at the entrance to a market to meet one another. I felt that with this historic site I had a chance to recreate some of that feeling". The floors in the brew tower were removed and three new floors of office space created. Windows in the tower were replaced and the building reinforced with steel.

== Cycleway ==
A controversial cycleway was constructed in Molesworth Street in 2024. Although cyclists support the cycleway, many businesses and residents oppose it. The cycleway passes up the right hand side of the one-way street, crossing the entrance to New World supermarket. Foodstuffs, owner of the supermarket, took Wellington City Council to court in May 2024, arguing that it was not safe to have cyclists travelling past such a busy location. Wellington City Council stated that it had considered various options for cycleways on Moleswortth Street (uphill) and Mulgrave Street (downhill) and chose the right hand route in Molesworth Street because it avoided bus stops and the motorway onramp and “provided improved cycle activity”. The court ruled in favour of Wellington City Council, but in May 2025 Foodstuffs was granted permission to appeal the decision. Over 50 car parks were removed from Molesworth Street for the cycleway, and it is reported to have slowed bus travel times in Molesworth Street.
