= David Davies (Dean of Wellington) =

Dean of Saint Paul's Cathedral, Wellington, New Zealand

David Jones Davies was Dean of Saint Paul's Cathedral, Wellington from 1948 to 1962.

Davies was educated at the University of Wales and St. Michael's College, Llandaff; and ordained in 1916. After curacies in Canton, Mottram in Longdendale and Gisborne, New Zealand he held incumbencies at Ōpunake, Greytown, Palmerston North and Kilbirnie before joining the staff of Saint Paul's Cathedral, Wellington in 1938.
