= Old St Paul's, Wellington =

Historic Anglican church in Wellington, New Zealand

Old St Paul's
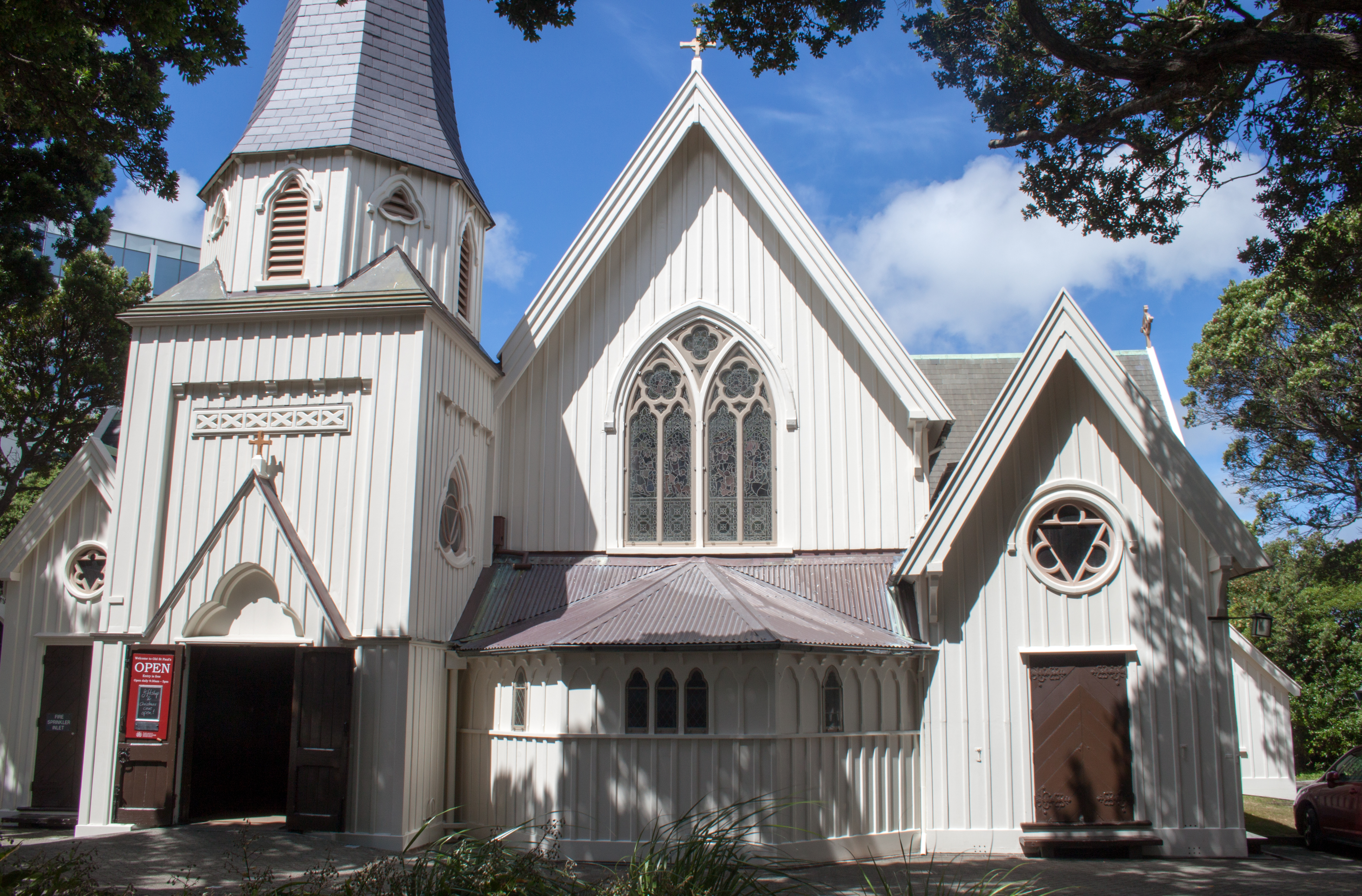
- Main entrance to Old St Paul's
- Old St Paul's
- 41°16′35″S 174°46′49″E
- Address: Mulgrave Street, Wellington
- Country: New Zealand
- Previous denomination: Anglican

History
- Status: Parish church (1865 – ????); Pro-Cathedral; Cathedral ( – 1964); Event venue (since 1967)
- Founded: 21 August 1865
- Founder: Governor George Grey
- Dedication: Paul the Apostle
- Consecrated: 6 June 1866 by Bishop Charles Abraham

Architecture
- Functional status: Events venue
- Architect: Rev'd Frederick Thatcher
- Architectural type: Church
- Style: Gothic Revival
- Years built: 1865–1866

Heritage New Zealand – Category 1
- Designated: 26 November 1981
- Reference no.: 38

Old St Paul's (formerly St Paul's Pro-Cathedral) is a historic site and city landmark in central Wellington, the capital city of New Zealand. The building was consecrated in 1866 and served a dual role as the parish church of Thorndon and the pro-cathedral (provisional cathedral) of the Diocese of Wellington of the Anglican Church from 1866 until 1964. It exemplifies 19th-century Gothic Revival architecture adapted to colonial conditions and materials, and is located at 34 Mulgrave Street, Pipitea, close to Parliament Buildings.

While no longer used as a parish church, it remains consecrated, and is a popular venue for weddings, funerals and other services. It is also a popular visitor attraction, and has been described as "one of the best examples of timber Gothic Revival architecture in the world".

== History ==
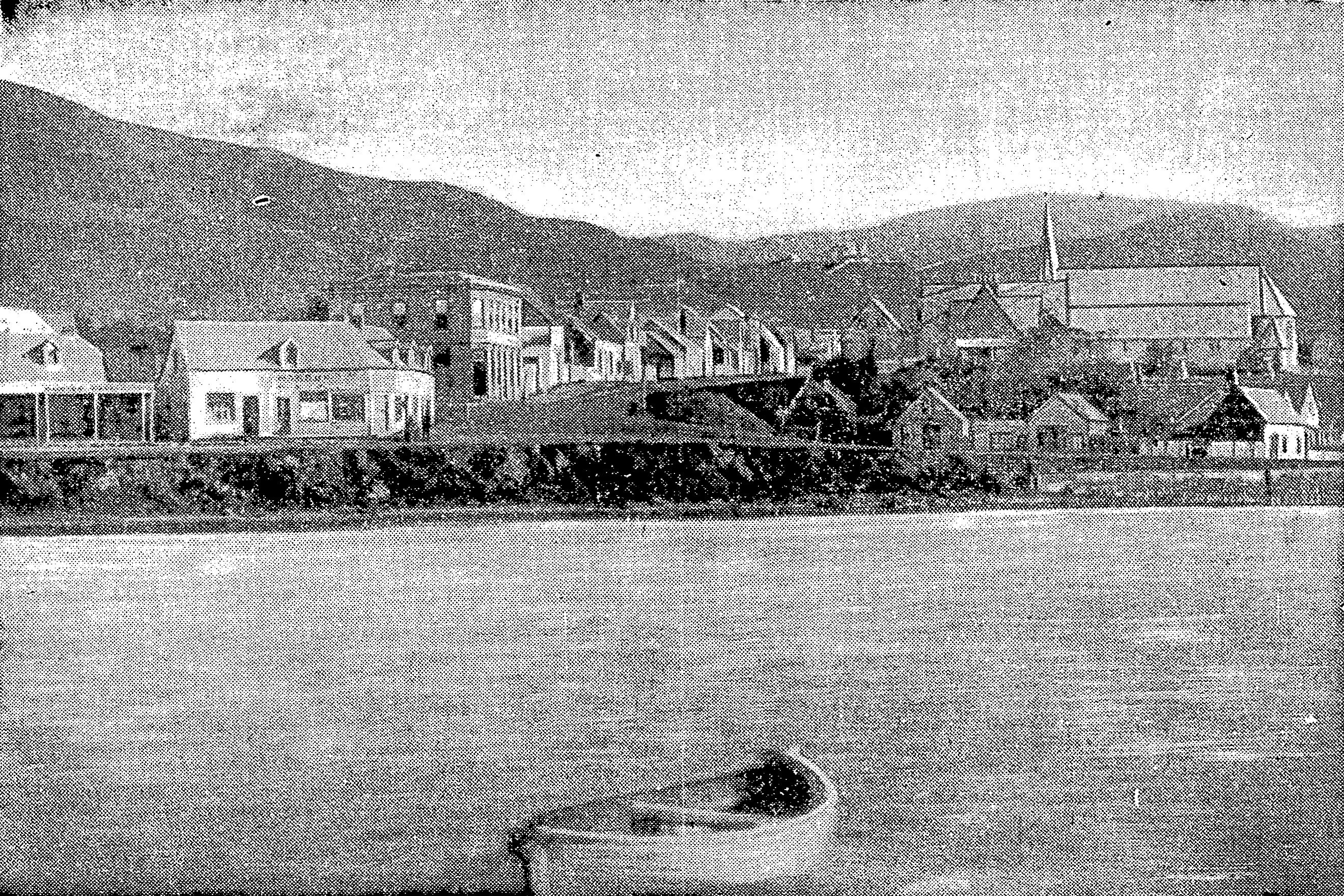
Mulgrave Street in 1866, with Old St Paul's on the right

George Selwyn, the first Bishop of New Zealand, purchased part of the site of the church in 1845 and Governor George Grey added to it in 1853, at which time the land stood on a prominent cliff-top overlooking Wellington Harbour. Agreement to build the church was reached by 1861 and the Reverend Frederick Thatcher, then vicar of St Paul's, Thorndon, was engaged as the architect.

The foundation stone was laid by Governor Grey on 21 August 1865. The building work was executed by John McLaggan and a team of eight carpenters, and the church was consecrated by Bishop Abraham on 6 June 1866.

Soon after the church opened, it became apparent that it was unstable in high winds, and so the south transept, designed by Christian Julius Toxward, was added in 1868. Later additions included the north transept and north-aisle extension, also by Toxward, in 1874; the moving of the chancel five metres to the east and the addition of minor north and south transepts to the design of George Fannin in 1876; the choir vestry in 1882, probably designed by Toxward; and extension of the baptistry as designed by Frederick de Jersey Clere in 1891. Thatcher’s original wooden shingle roof was replaced with corrugated iron in 1895, and subsequently with Welsh slates in 1924.

=== Threat and preservation ===
The Diocese of Wellington plans for the new Wellington Cathedral of St Paul included the demolition of Old St Paul's. The proposed demolition led to strong opposition, and a ten year campaign to save the building. One of the advocates for preserving Old St Paul's was Betty Plant, who had been involved with the church since childhood, and had led a company of Girl Guides there for 30 years. The preservation of the church was finally secured when the New Zealand Government purchased the church in 1967, and vested it in the New Zealand Historic Places Trust (now Heritage New Zealand). The church was subsequently restored by the Ministry of Works under the guidance of Peter Sheppard.

Plant was appointed as curator of Old St Paul's by the Historic Places Trust in 1969, and undertook the role for 11 years. Her knowledge of the building was said to be "encyclopaedic", and she gave tours to visitors as well as cleaning the church, in what she described as a "labour of love". In 1979, Plant was appointed as the verger for the Wellington Cathedral of St Paul, despite the history of her strenuous opposition to the Diocese of Wellington proposals for Old St Pauls. She was the first woman verger in Wellington, and held the role until 1987.

Old St Paul's was listed by the New Zealand Historic Places Trust as a Category 1 Historic Place on 26 November 1981. In 2016 a celebration service of evensong was held in the cathedral to commemorate 150 years since it was consecrated.

The building was closed between May 2019 and July 2020 for seismic strengthening work.

== Architecture ==
Old St Paul's is built in a Gothic Revival style, albeit with a subdued effect due to the limited resources available. It is constructed from New Zealand native timbers, with stunning stained-glass windows. The interior has been likened to the upturned hull of an Elizabethan galleon, with exposed curving rimu trusses and kauri roof sarking.

== Current usage ==
While no longer used as a parish church, it remains consecrated, and is a popular venue for weddings, funerals and other services. It is also a popular visitor attraction, and has been described as "one of the best examples of timber Gothic Revival architecture in the world".

The flags displayed in the nave include the ensigns of the Royal Navy, the New Zealand Merchant Navy and the United States Marine Corps (second division), which was stationed in Wellington during World War II. The church retains close links with the New Zealand Defence Force.

Some of the walls and columns of Old St Paul's are decorated with memorial plaques, including many dedicated to those who fought and died in World War I. There is a plaque in memory of Wellington historian John Beaglehole, most famous for his biography of explorer James Cook, but who also played a significant role in the fight to save Old St Paul's from demolition.

== In popular culture ==
A son et lumière show was performed in the building in 1975 to celebrate the preservation of the church and the completion of restoration work. A further son et lumière show was presented in 2007, telling the story of the survival of Old St Paul's through song, with narration by the Wellington actor Ray Henwood, and including some of the script and voice recordings from the 1975 performance.

== Friends of Old St Paul’s ==
A group established in the 1960s to protect Old St Paul's became established as the Friends of Old St Paul’s. The group is currently an incorporated society and also a registered charity in New Zealand. The registered charitable purpose is "Preservation of Old St. Paul's Church and promotion of its use for interdenominational religious services, retreats and musical or dramatic performances etc.".

== Gallery ==
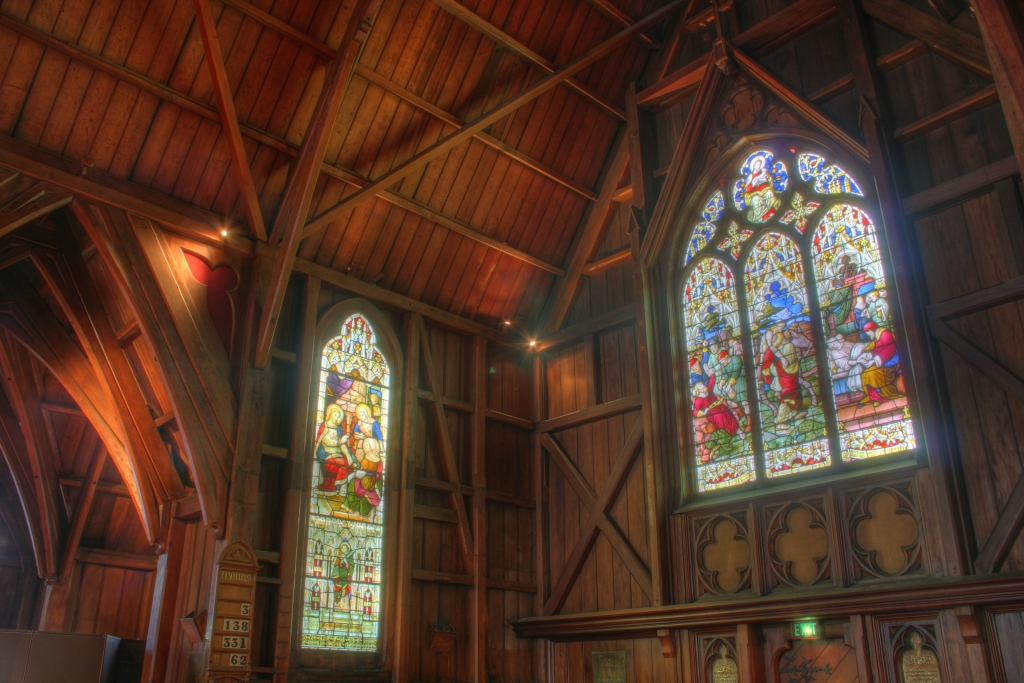
Stained-glass windows in the south alcove

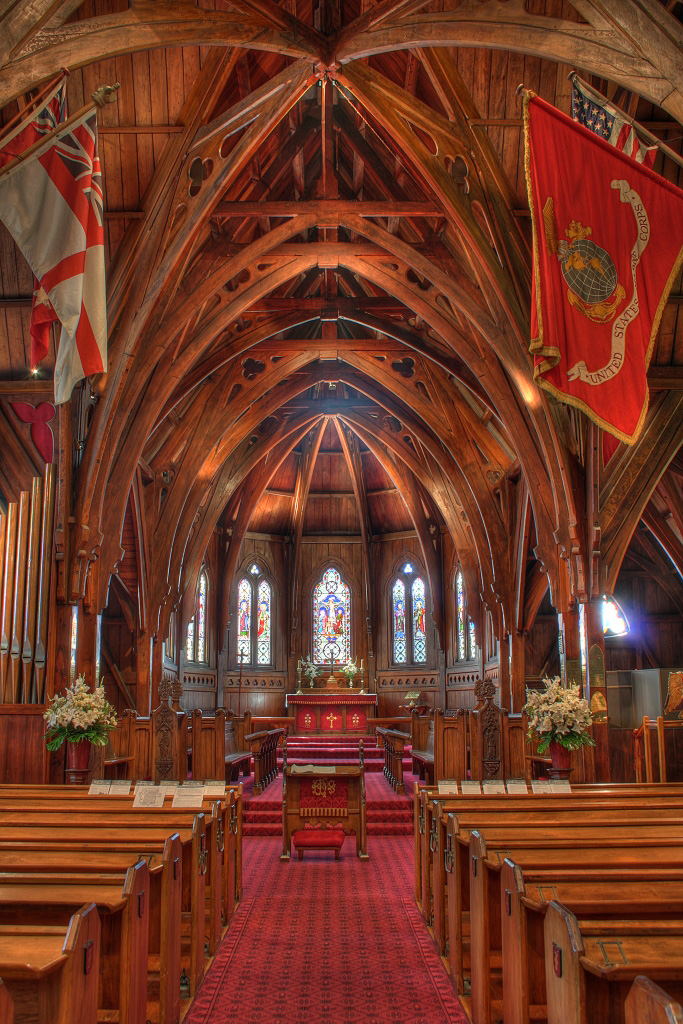
Nave

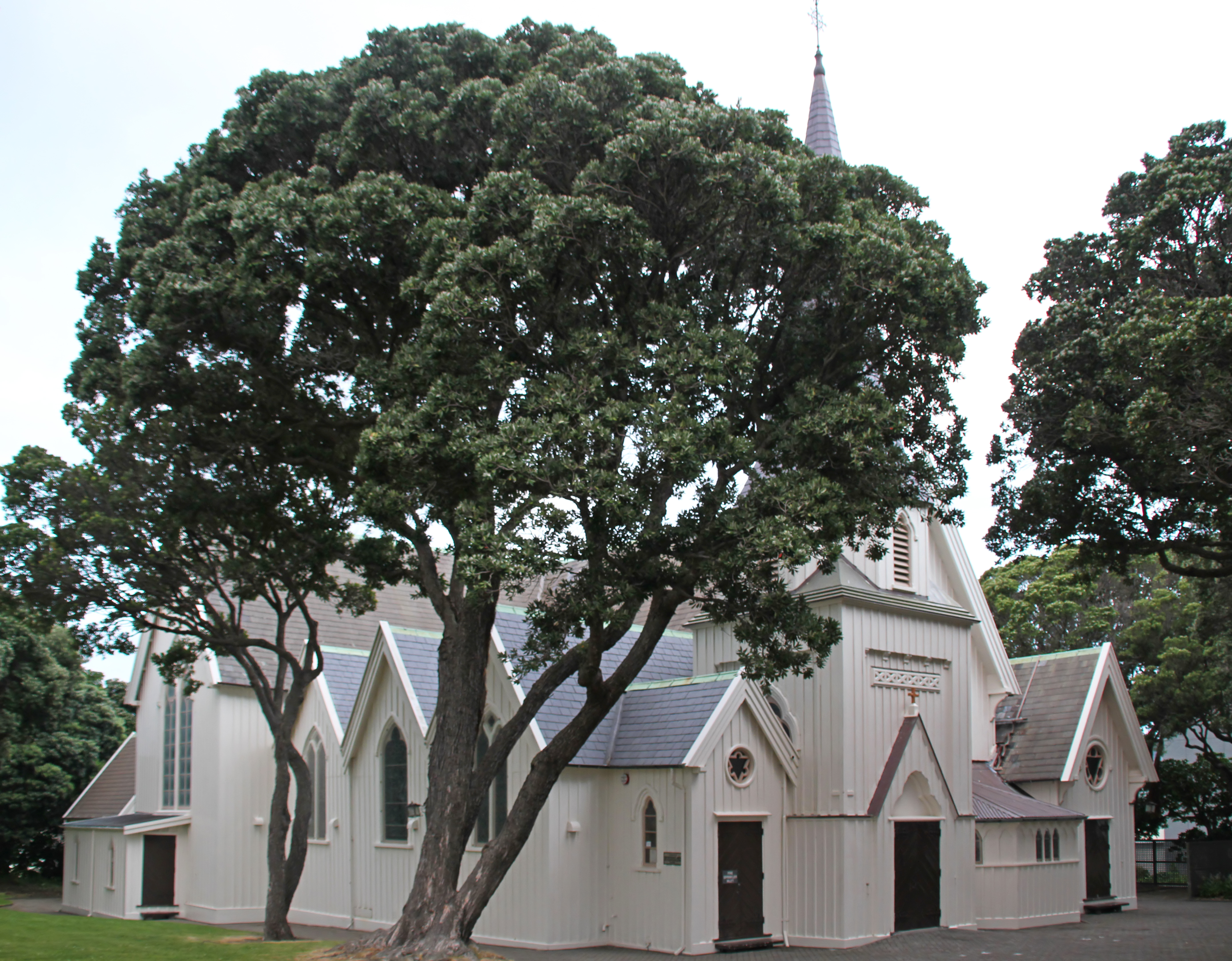
Exterior from the front/side

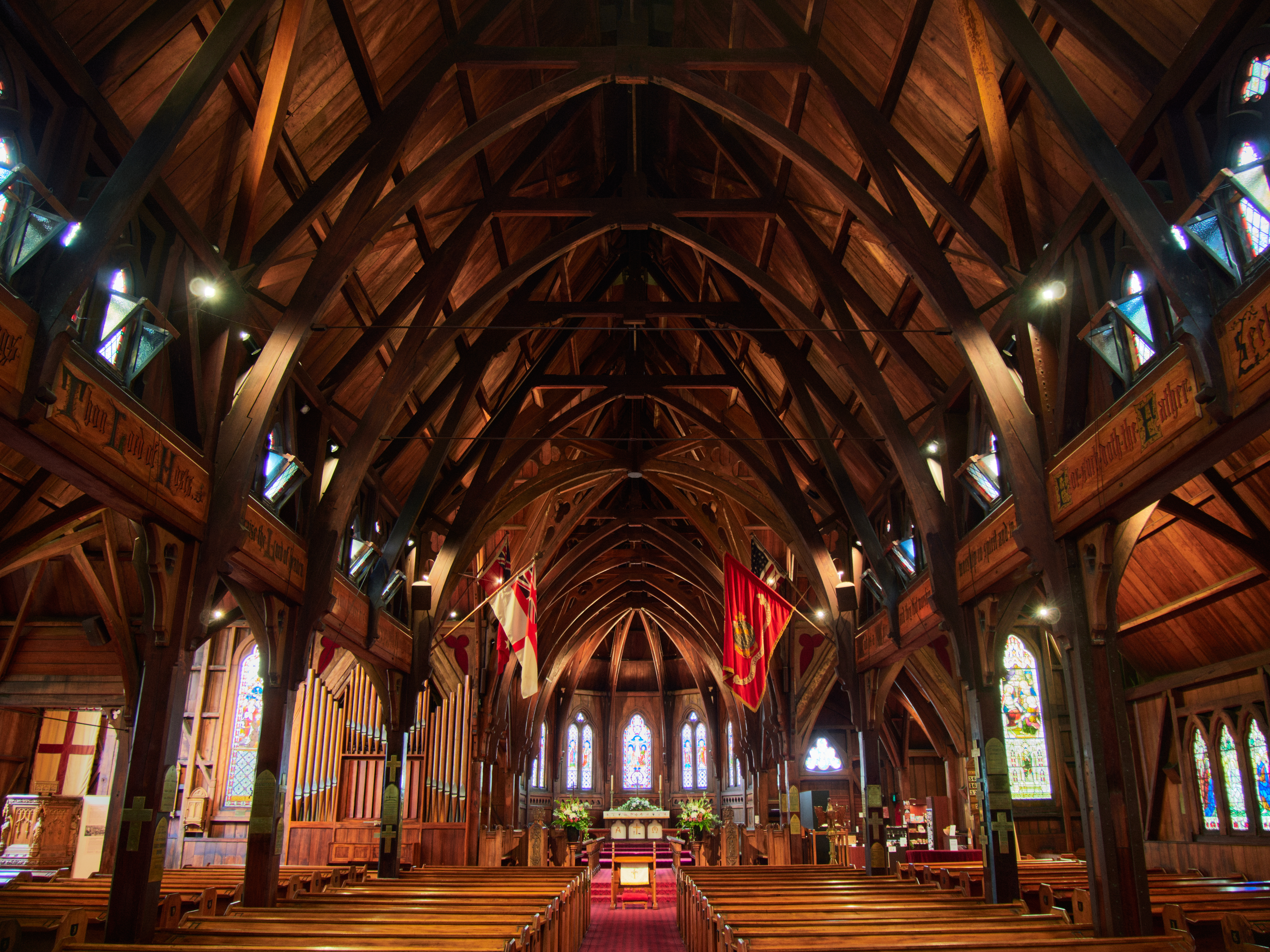
Interior, wide shot

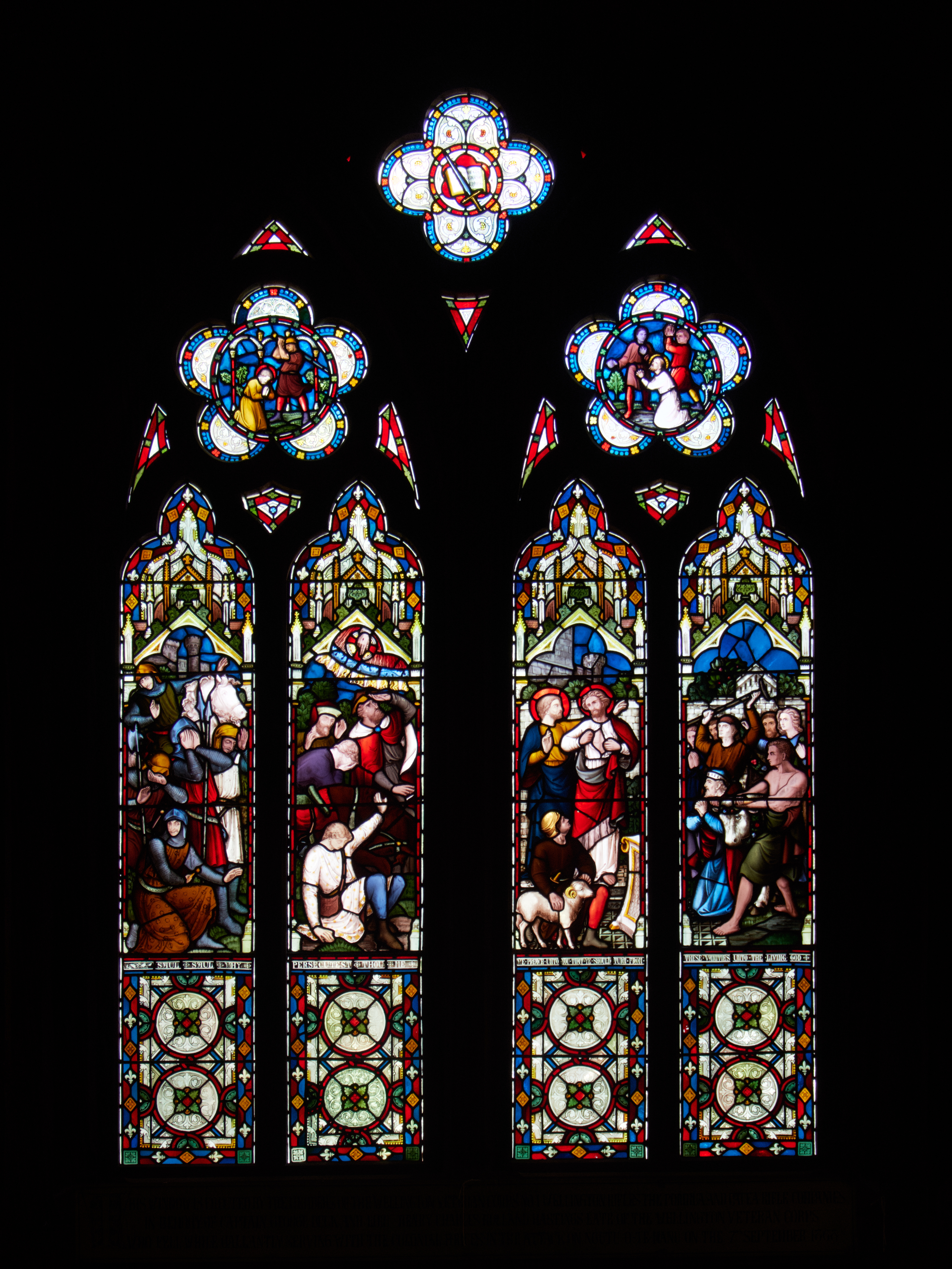
Stained glass panel
