= Wellington Cathedral of St Paul =

- St Paul's Cathedral; Wellington Cathedral
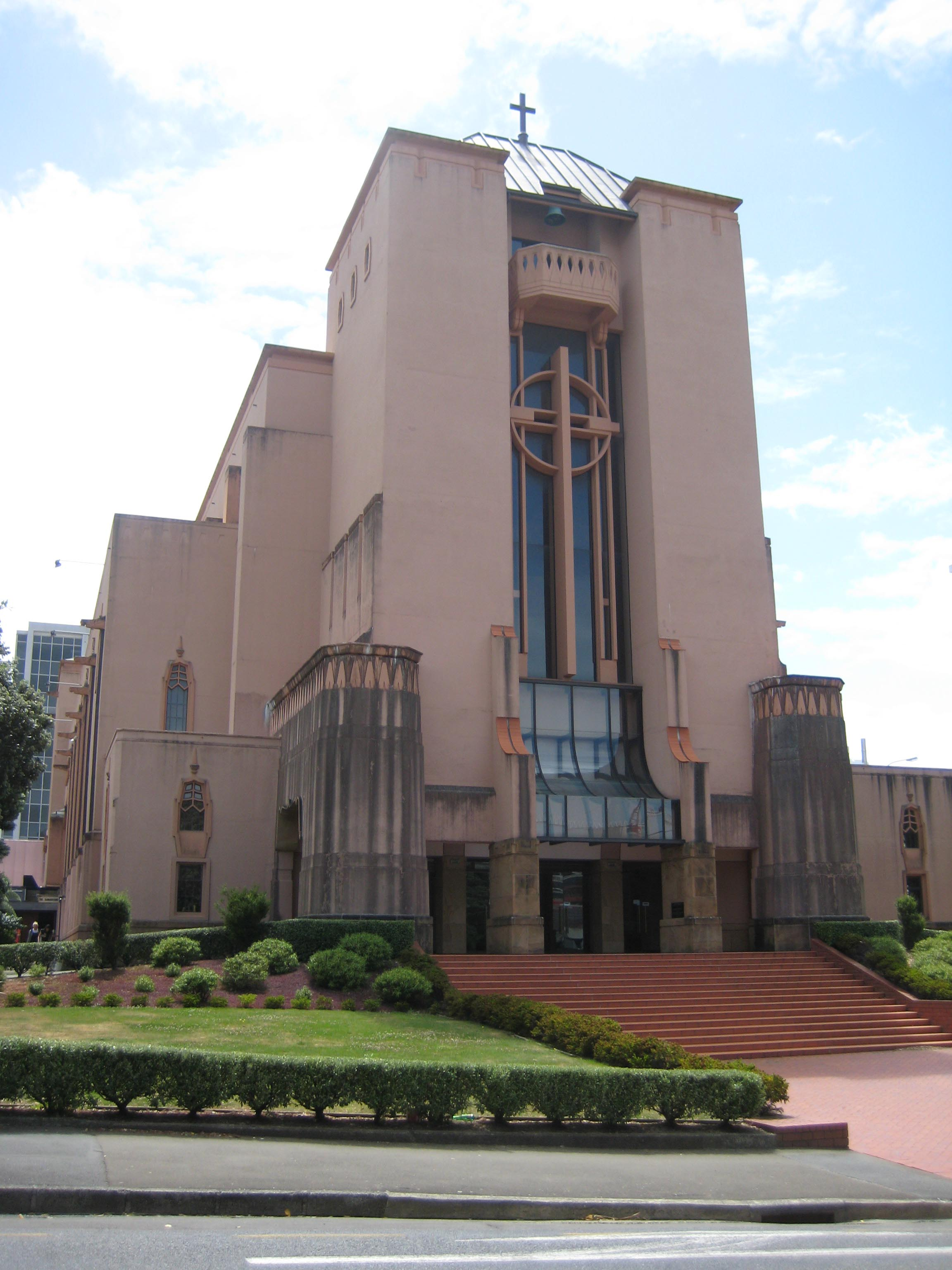
- St Paul's Cathedral
- Wellington Cathedral of St Paul
- 41°16′35″S 174°46′39″E
- Location: Hill Street, Thorndon, Wellington
- Country: New Zealand
- Denomination: Anglican
- Website: wellingtoncathedral.org.nz

History
- Status: Cathedral (since 1964)
- Founded: 13 January 1954
- Dedication: Paul the Apostle
- Dedicated: 17 May 1964
- Consecrated: 15 October 2001

Architecture
- Functional status: Active
- Architect: Cecil Wood
- Architectural type: Church
- Style: Art Deco and; Neo-Byzantine
- Years built: 1954 – 2002

Specifications
- Length: 88 metres (289 ft)
- Height: 18 metres (59 ft)
- Materials: Reinforced concrete

Administration
- Province: New Zealand
- Diocese: Wellington
- Parish: Wellington City

Clergy
- Archbishop: Justin Duckworth
- Dean: Katie Lawrence

The Wellington Cathedral of St Paul, also called St Paul's Cathedral or Wellington Cathedral, is an Anglican cathedral church located on Hill Street, at its junction with Molesworth Street, in Thorndon, in the city of Wellington, New Zealand. It is situated close to the parliament precinct.

The cathedral is the mother church of the Diocese of Wellington and the seat of the Bishop of Wellington, within the Anglican Church in Aotearoa, New Zealand and Polynesia.

The building was designed in the 1930s by New Zealand architect Cecil Wood. Construction began in 1954, and was completed in 1998. It was constructed in reinforced concrete due to the effects of the 1931 Napier earthquake making other choices impractical. The church was initially envisioned as a war memorial cathedral, and it was designed on a monumental scale. The Archbishop of New Zealand, Reginald Herbert Owen, declared in 1958: "Every nation needs in its capital city a great church to express its belief in the things of the spirit". The building began to be used as an Anglican cathedral in 1964 (replacing Old St Paul's), and was consecrated in 2001.

== Services ==
As well as being a popular attraction, St Paul's Cathedral is a working church with daily services. The cathedral, as the largest church in Wellington, also plays a role in many state occasions.

== History ==
=== Background ===
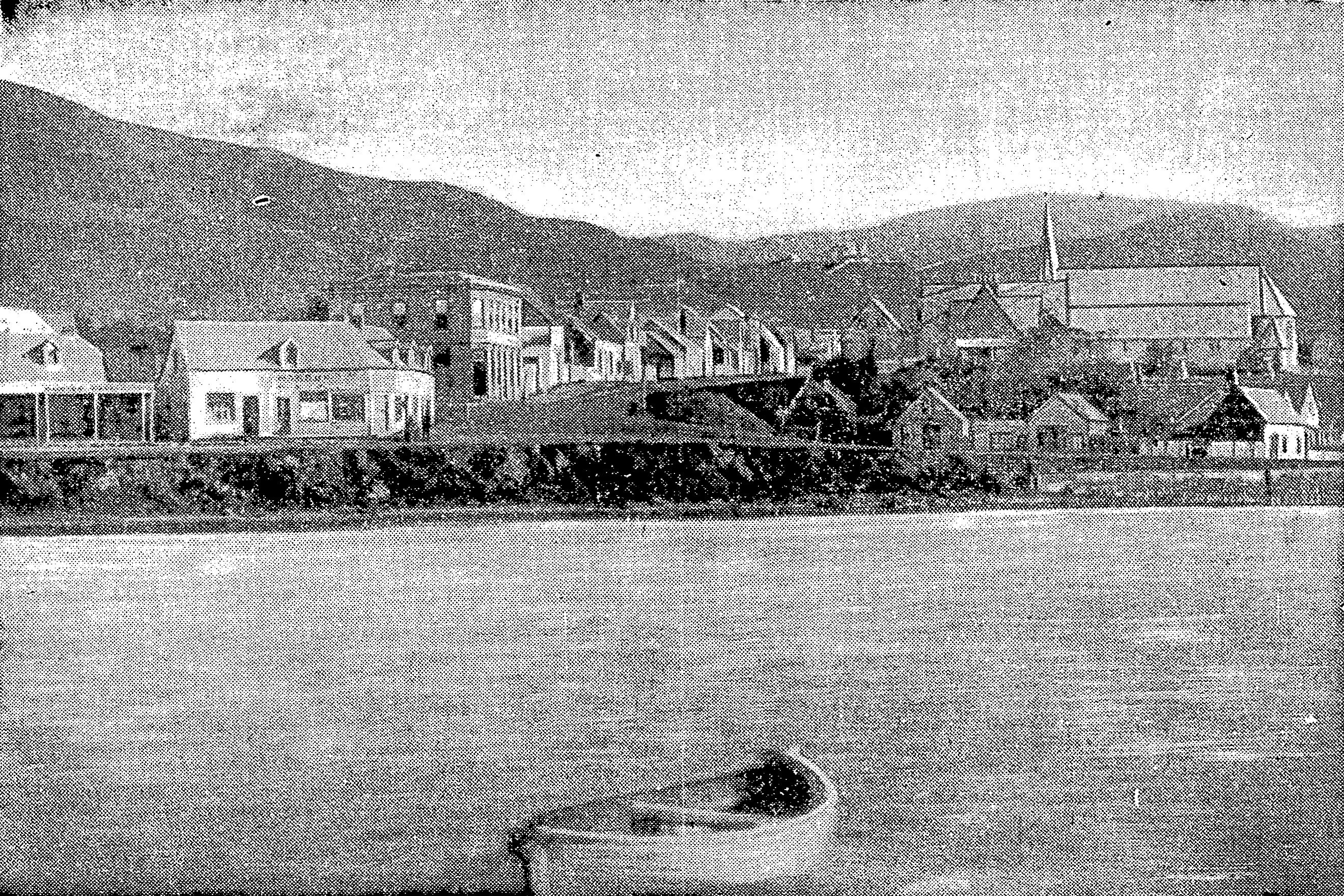
Mulgrave Street in 1866, with Old St Paul's, the pro-cathedral, on the right

The first Church of St Paul stood behind where the Beehive stands today. This served as the first Anglican parish church for the early British settlers.

As early as the 1840s preparations for a cathedral had been made and bricks were laid. However, the first project came to an end in 1855 after an earthquake hit Wellington, which highlighted the unsuitability of brick buildings in such an area.

Construction of a second church, today known as "Old St Paul's", located behind the Pipitea Marae, began in 1855. It was the pro-cathedral church for the Anglican Diocese of Wellington from 1866 to 1964. Old St Paul's is still consecrated, but owned by Heritage New Zealand.

In 1907, the diocese acquired land for a permanent cathedral, a site close to the Basin Reserve. In July 1917, the diocesan synod approved preliminary plans drawn up by architect Frank Peck for an elaborate Gothic structure on the site. It was to include a memorial military chapel in the west wing, in which the names of all New Zealanders who had fallen in the Boer War and First World War would be commemorated, and flags of the regiments displayed. Fund-raising for the proposed "Wellington Memorial Cathedral" began the following year, with collections even in England. However, in 1923, the synod decided the original ambitious plans were too costly to proceed with.

=== Construction ===
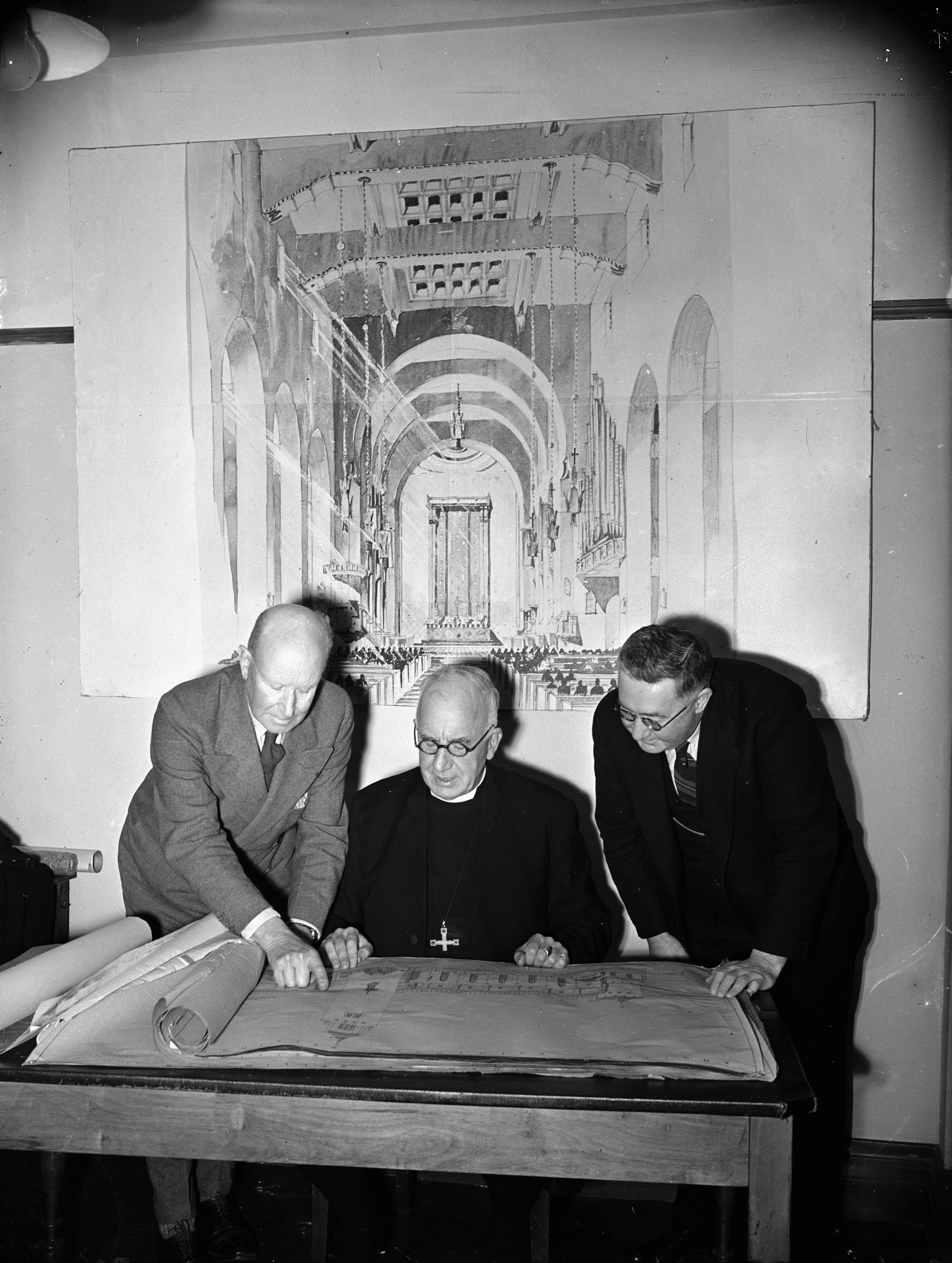
Cecil Wood, H St Barbe Holland and Will Appleton discussing plans for the new Wellington Cathedral in 1945 (from left)

Plans were revived in 1937, when it was decided to make the cathedral a project for the national centennial of 1940. The diocese selected Cecil Wood, a New Zealand architect, to design the building. A new site was acquired on Molesworth Street, close to the Parliament Buildings and the Roman Catholic Cathedral. After the 1931 Napier earthquake, the decision was made to construct the cathedral primarily out of reinforced concrete, which was deemed to be more earthquake-resistant. Wood was inspired by the Art Deco architecture of Southern California, and the neo-Byzantine-style of the Roman Catholic Westminster Cathedral, London. His final design, which has been implemented relatively unchanged, was a 88-metre (289 ft) long and 18-metre (59 ft) high building.

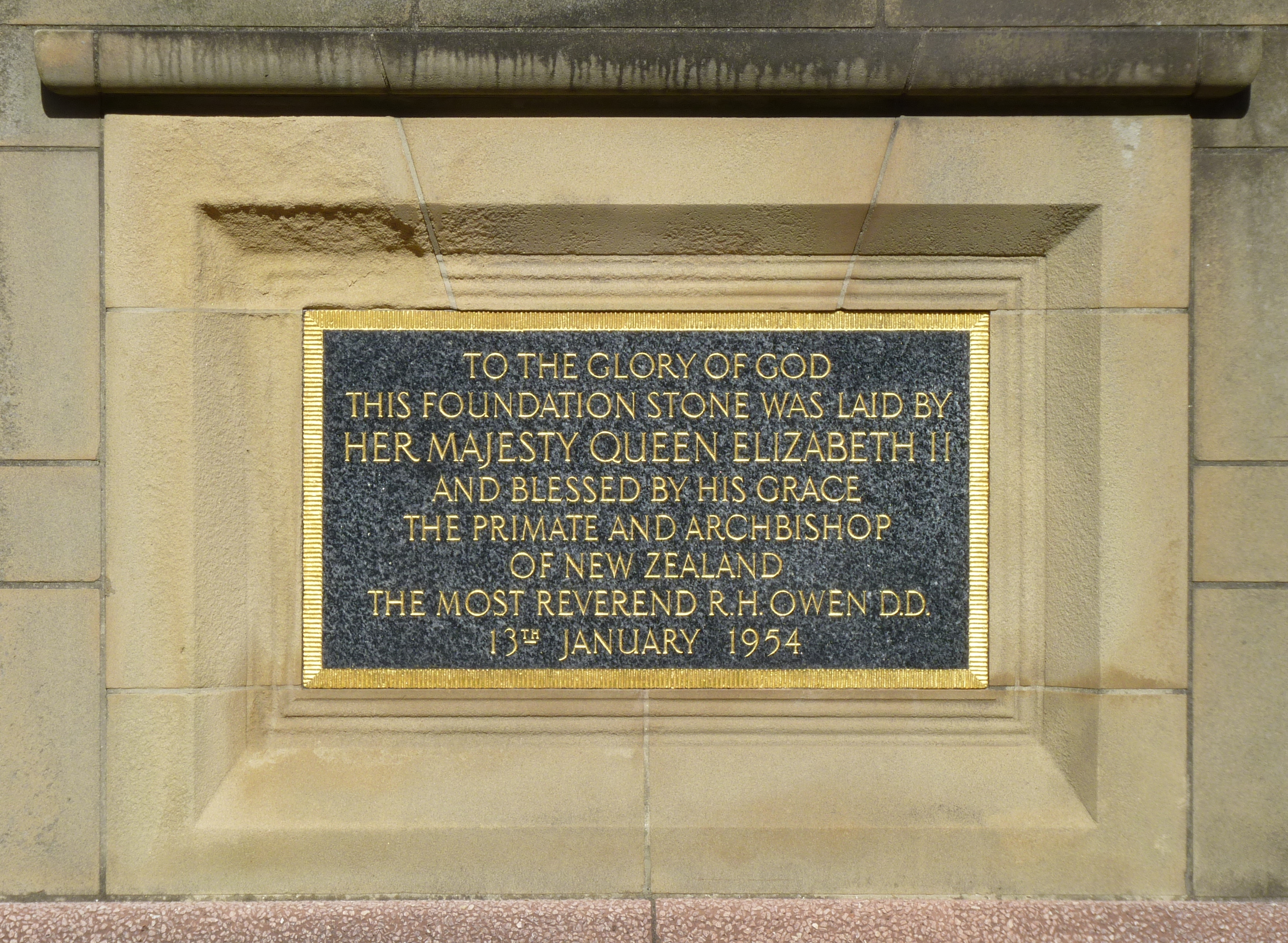
Cathedral foundation stone, laid by the Queen on 13 January 1954

Construction of the new cathedral was delayed by the Second World War and its aftermath, and ultimately the project took about 50 years to complete. The foundation stone was laid by Queen Elizabeth II on 13 January 1954; the first stage was dedicated on 17 May 1964; the second stage was dedicated on 5 November 1972. The bell tower was added in 1984, and dedicated on Easter Day, April 1984.

In 1992, the diocesan synod decided to raise money for a third and final stage of construction. The completed cathedral was dedicated on 31 May 1998 and consecrated on 15 October 2001; finally, on 24 February 2002, the Queen unveiled the consecration stone.

== Chapels ==
The wooden Lady Chapel is along the ambulatory to the left of the pulpit. The Lady Chapel was formerly the parish church of St Paul's at Paraparaumu. Designed by the diocesan architect Frederick de Jersey Clere, the chapel was opened on its Paraparaumu site in 1905. It was moved to the grounds of Wellington Cathedral in 1990, and consecrated on 12 May 1991.

A second smaller chapel space is located to the left of the entrance. It is furnished plainly with a small altar.

== Features ==
=== Artwork and memorials ===
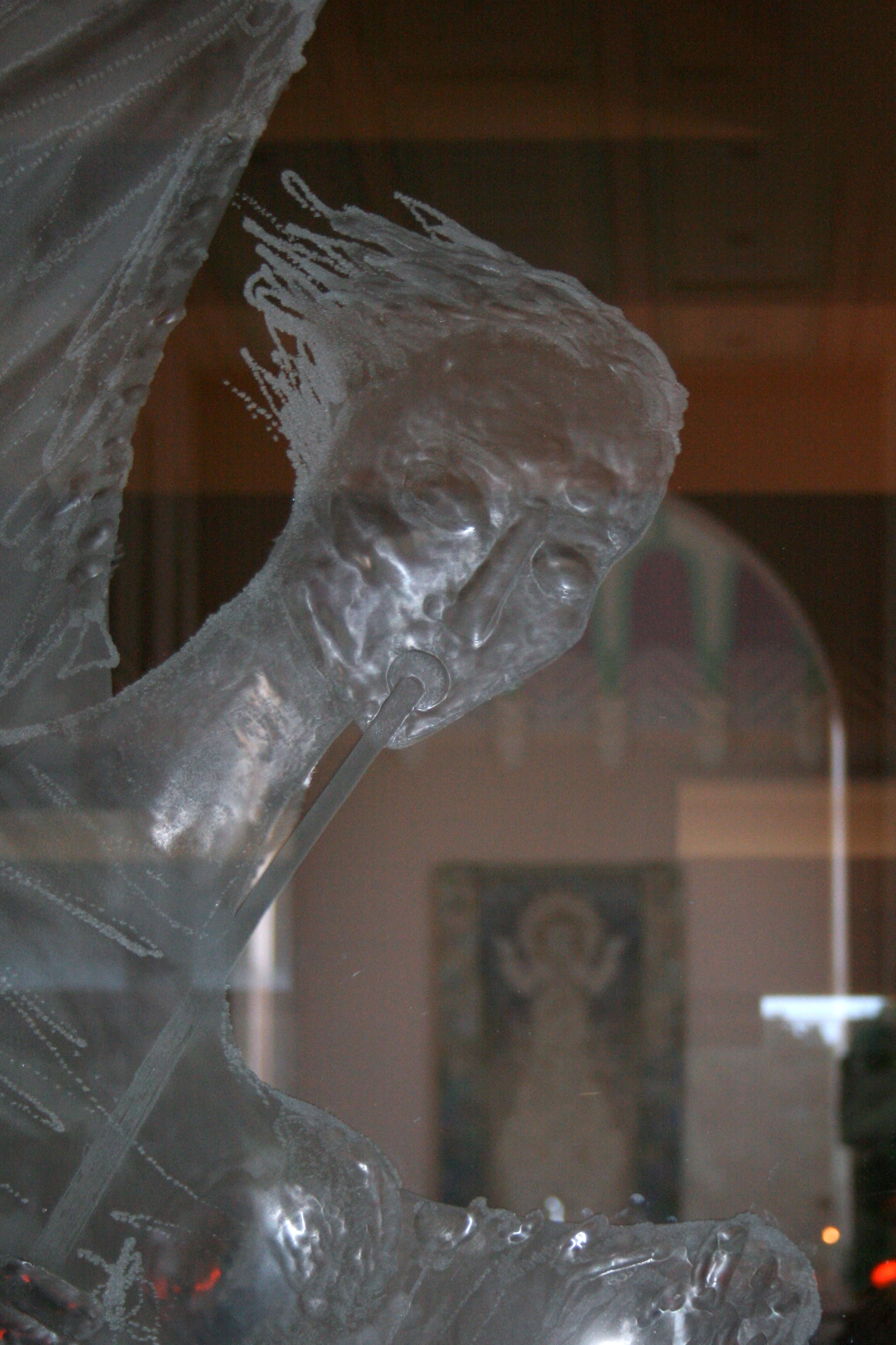
One of the Hutton glass angels; the dossal is visible through the glass

The cathedral's nave contains many stained-glass windows by church artist Brian Thomas, who had previously designed windows in Westminster Abbey and St Paul's Cathedral, London. Thomas took as his theme words of St Paul at the Areopagus: “The Unknown God: Him I now proclaim”. The windows were created by Whitefriars of London and depict figures and scenes such as the conversion of St Paul; Jacob, the patriarch who wrestled with an angel; Moses, the law-giver; David the hero King; the nativity of Jesus; and Christ's crucifixion and the resurrection.

The narthex (lobby) is separated from the rest of the nave by a wall consisting of glass panels depicting figures representing angels. The etchings are the work of New Zealand-born artist John Hutton. Similar work by Hutton exists in Coventry Cathedral in England.

==== Holm Window ====
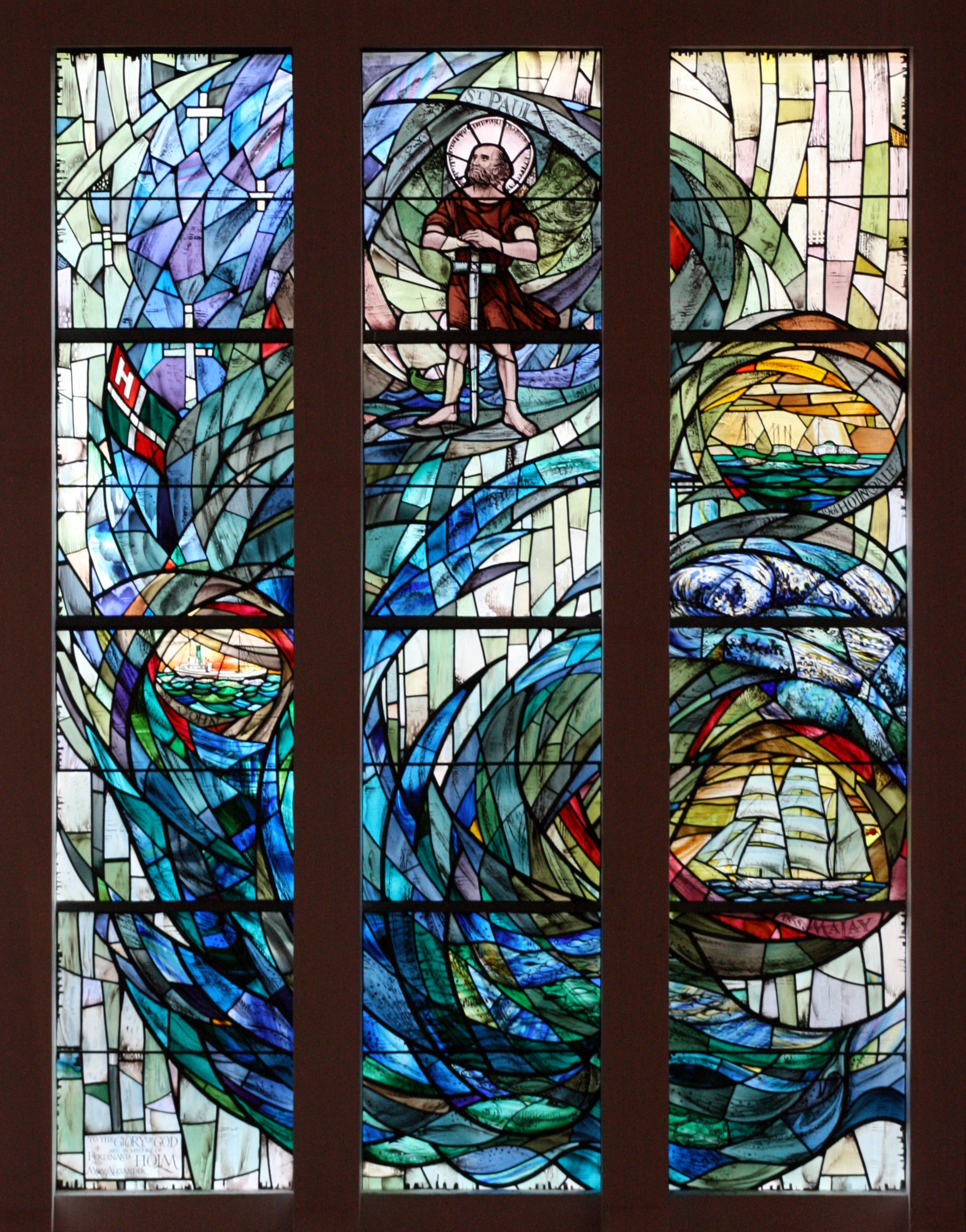
The Holm Window, installed 1970

In 1970, the Holm Memorial Window was installed above the three doors leading to the cathedral's Loaves and Fishes Hall. It was designed by Beverley Shore Bennett, a leading New Zealand stained-glass artist, and made by Roy Miller of Dunedin. The window is a memorial to prominent Wellington businessman Ferdinand Holm, founder of the Holm Shipping Company, and his wife Mary. St Paul, the patron saint of the cathedral, is shown at the top of the centre panel; the top of the left panel depicts the stars of the Southern Cross and the flag of the company; three ships represent stages in the development of the company.

==== War memorials ====
Although plans for a military chapel had been abandoned during construction, the cathedral authorities did allow for the installation of three sets of memorial windows in the Sanctuary—allocating two lancets each to the Army, Navy and Air Force.

Fund-raising for the two Air Force windows began in September 1957. Designed by the English artist Edward Liddall Armitage, these were installed in April 1962. They are dedicated to the members of the Air Force and New Zealanders who died in the service of the air forces of the Commonwealth during the Second World War. The four remaining windows were designed by New Zealand artist Howard Malitte and adapted for stained-glass by Brian Thomas. Governor-General Brigadier Sir Bernard Fergusson unveiled the Army memorial windows on 9 August 1966. They stand on either side of the organ loft, with the memorial tablet placed on the wall to the left of the Bishop's cathedra ("The two windows above this tablet were installed by serving and former members of the New Zealand Army to commemorate those who have served in the New Zealand Army at home and abroad since the foundation of our country…"). The naval and merchant service windows were unveiled on 22 October 1967. They were dedicated in memory of the men and women who lost their lives in the navies and merchant services of the Commonwealth during the two world wars. All six military windows incorporate a rich visual symbolism. A range of memorial flags is also housed in the bell tower.

The Memorial to Chunuk Bair, installed in 1998, is one of four memorials erected to commemorate New Zealand soldiers who died in the Battle of Gallipoli and whose graves are not known.

==== Dossal ====
The Sanctuary is dominated by a large altarpiece – a hanging artwork referred to as a dossal. It was designed by Beverley Shore Bennett, and installed in 1990. It consists of three panels, in total measuring approximately 8.8 metres (29 ft) by 4.5 metres (15 ft). The centre panel depicts the Risen Christ; the two side sections contain symbols used in historic Christian art.

=== Font ===
The wooden baptismal font, designed by Beverley Shore Bennett, is designed to be moved around the cathedral. During Eastertide it is placed in the centre of the nave. The base is decorated with four silver panels of cherubim; the cover depicts a dove, symbolising the Holy Spirit which descended on Christ after his baptism.

=== Organ ===
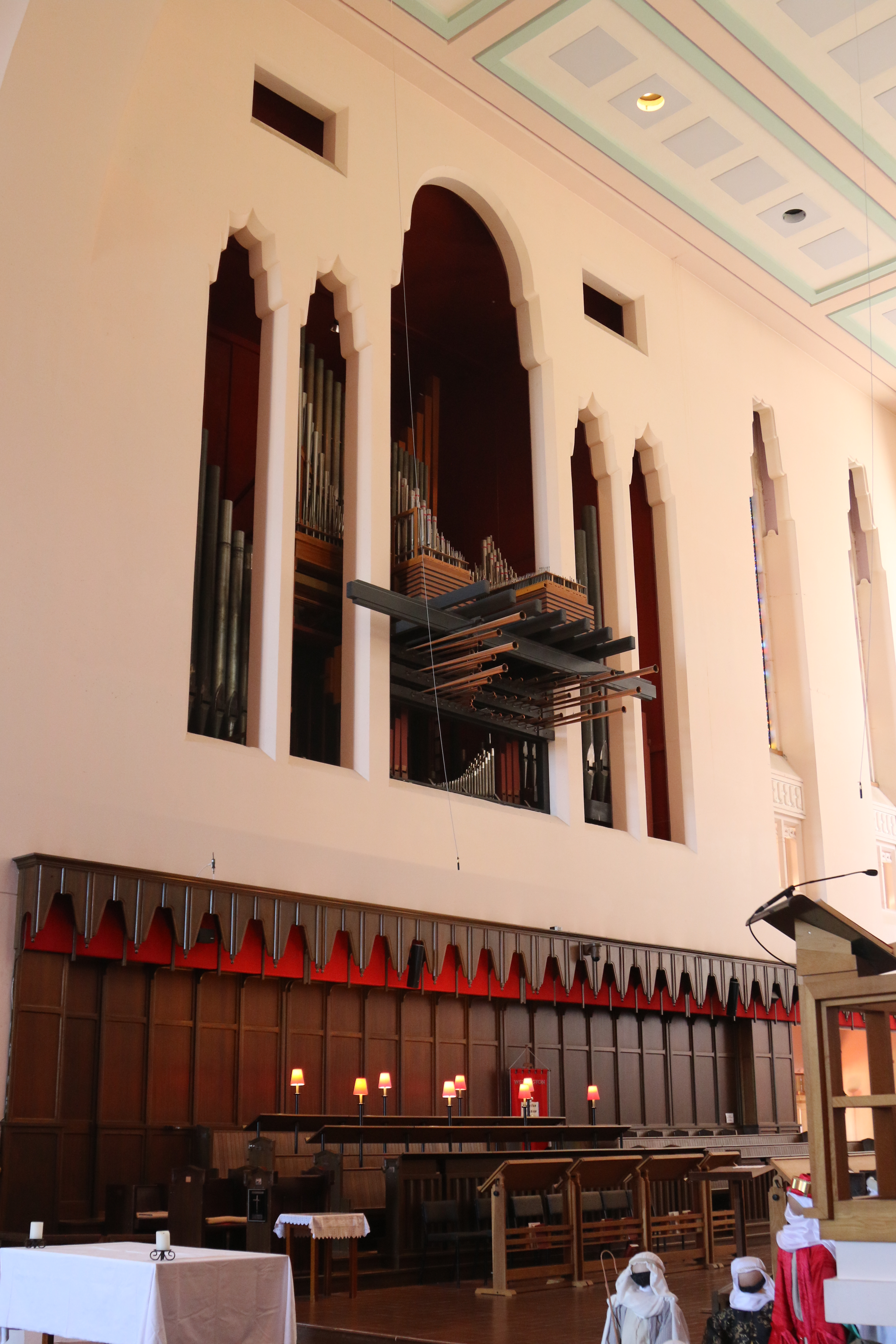
The former organ, located above the choir stalls in the chancel, January 2016

In 1980, the cathedral organ was rebuilt and enlarged. It had been first installed in Old St Paul's in 1877 as a two-manual tracker action instrument blown by water pressure. The console now has four manuals, 81 stops and there are some 3,500 pipes. The organ suffered "significant damage" after an earthquake in November 2016.

Following the damage to the old organ, the cathedral used two temporary digital organs. In October 2018, a replacement digital organ, a Viscount Regent Classic, was installed in place of the old one; it features four manuals, 85 stops and 42 speakers.

=== Bells ===
The cathedral's bell tower is one of only seven in New Zealand where change ringing takes place. It has 14 bells, ranging in size from Little James, weighing in at 4 long cwt (200 kg) to the People's Bell at 27 3/4 long cwt (1,410 kg). The bells were installed in 1984; seven of the bells were already over 100 years old at the time, having been moved from a demolished church, St Edmund's in Northampton, England.

In May 2025 a storm blew over an ash tree growing in front of the cathedral. Wood from the tree will be used as stays for the bells as it is the ideal wood for making stays being hard and flexible.

== Deans of St Paul ==
The Chapter of St Paul has had nine deans:

- 1948–1962: David Davies
- 1963–1977: Walter Hurst
- 1978–1985: James Thomas
- 1985–2002: Michael Brown
- 2003–2004: Douglas Sparks
- 2004–2012: Frank Nelson (afterwards Dean of Adelaide, 2012)
- 2012–2018: Digby Wilkinson
- 2018–2021: David Rowe
- 2023–present: Katie Lawrence

== Gallery ==
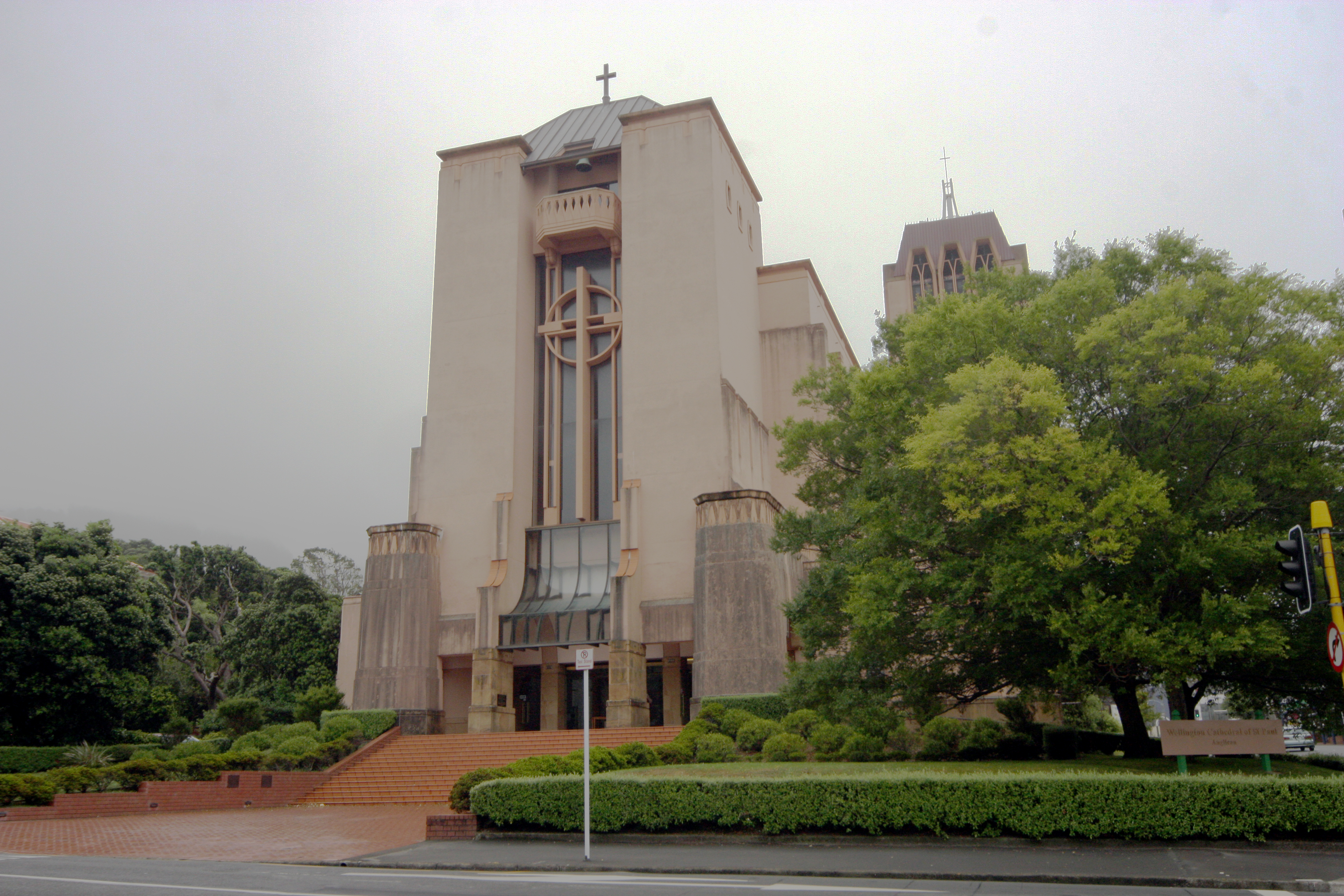
Main entrance of the cathedral off Hill Street.

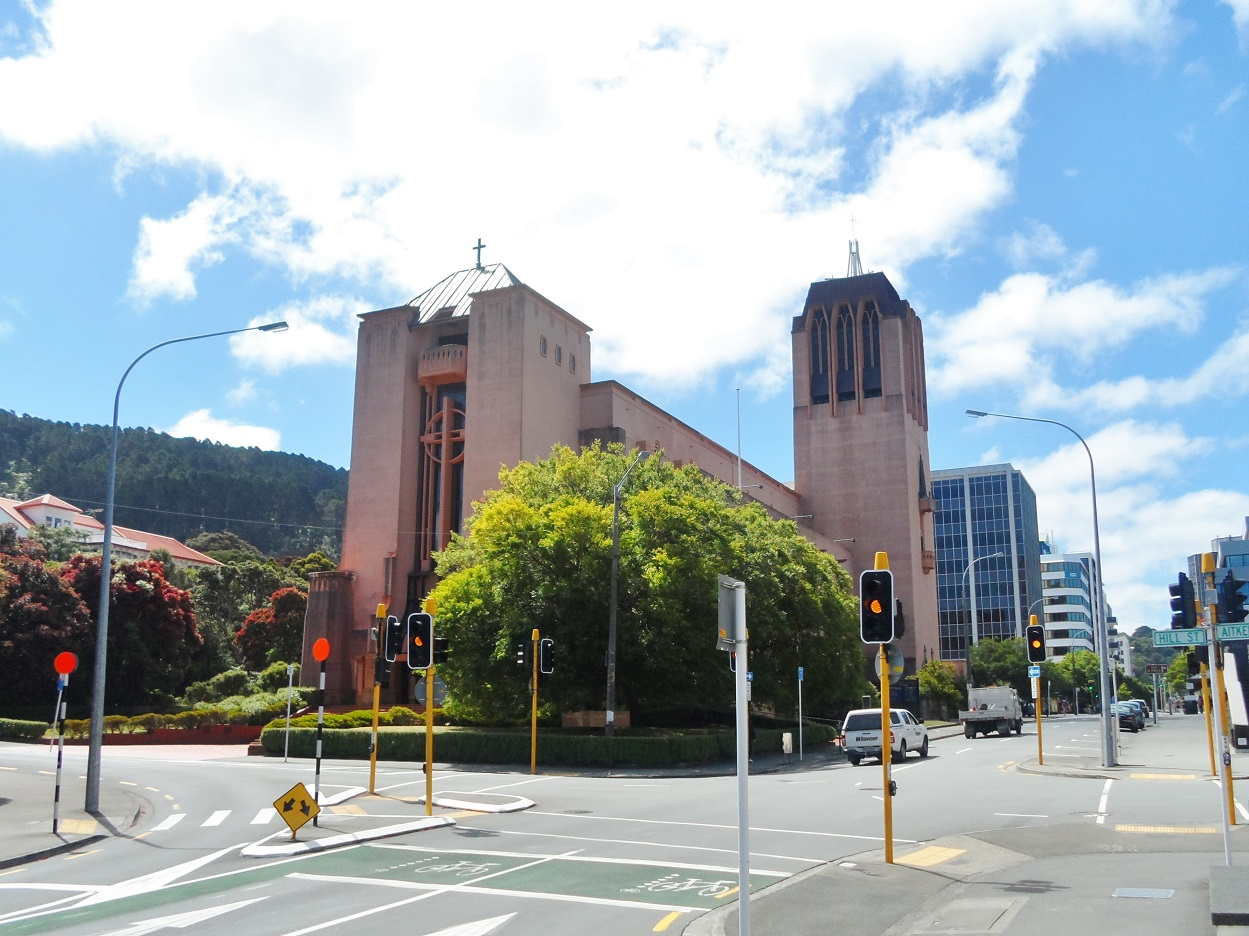
Front/side of cathedral. Molesworth Street is on the right-hand side.

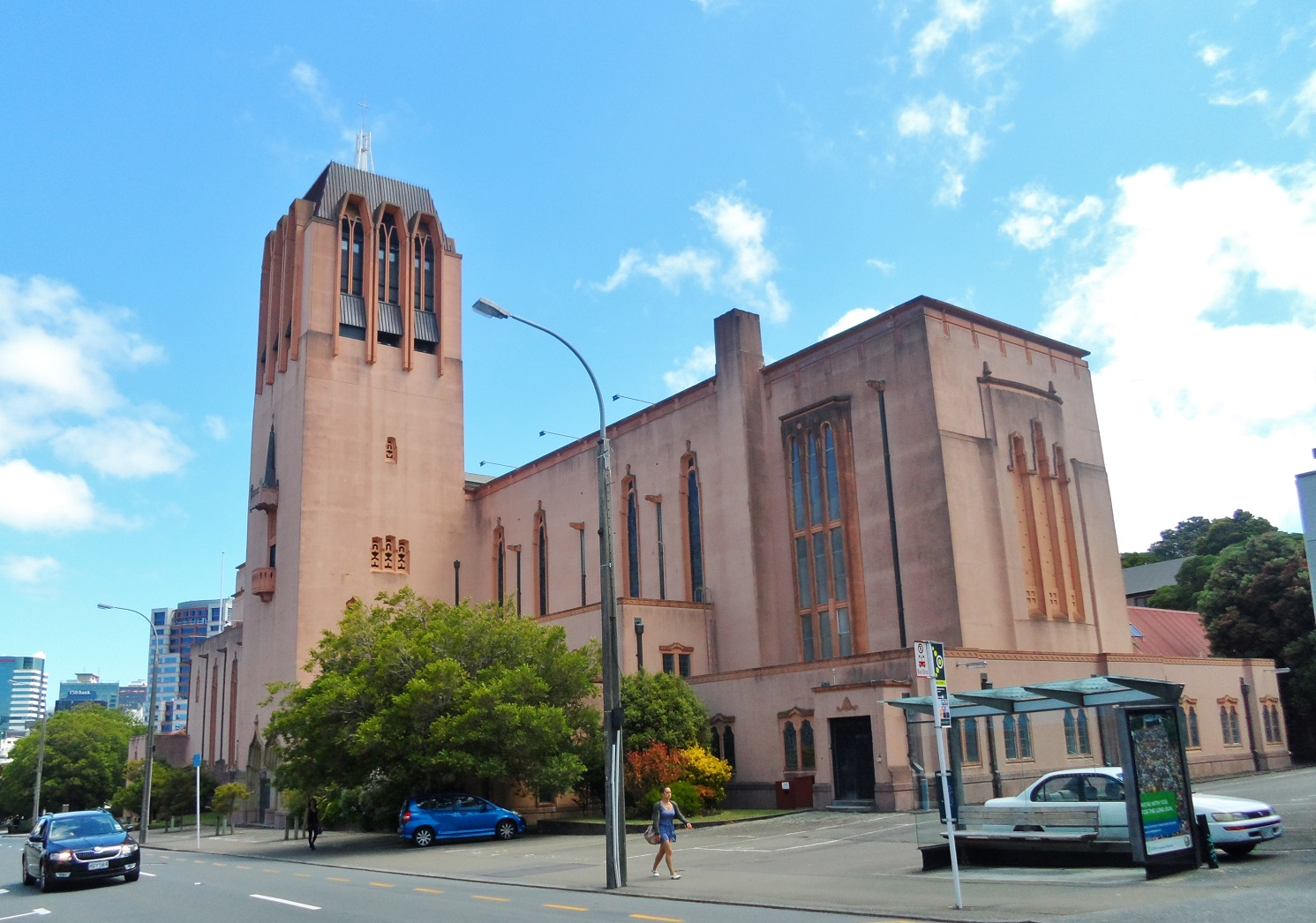
Rear/side view of cathedral. A secondary entrance is near the bell tower.

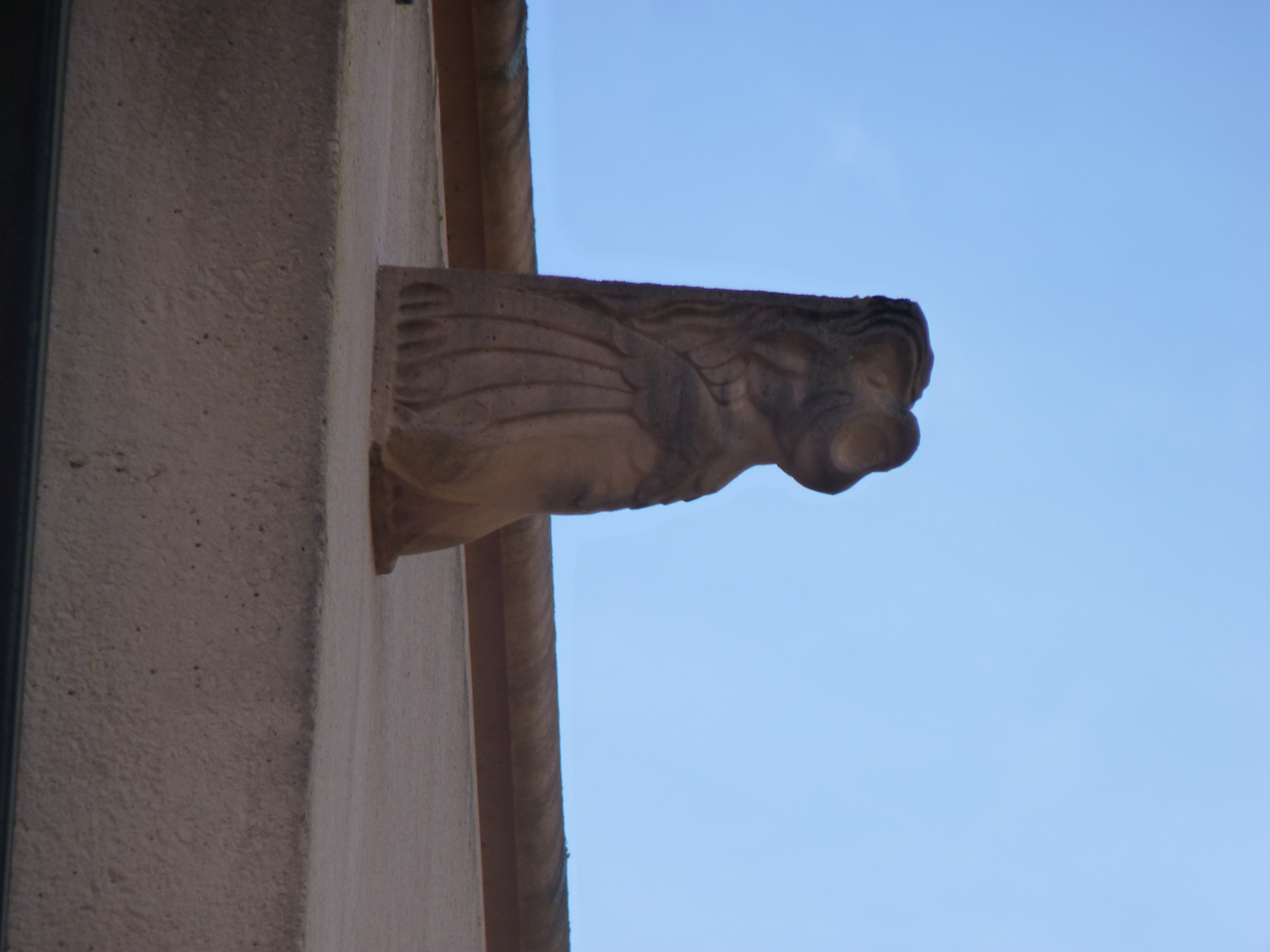
One of the grotesques that adorn the outside of the building, cast in concrete by Wellington sculptor J. A. McCready

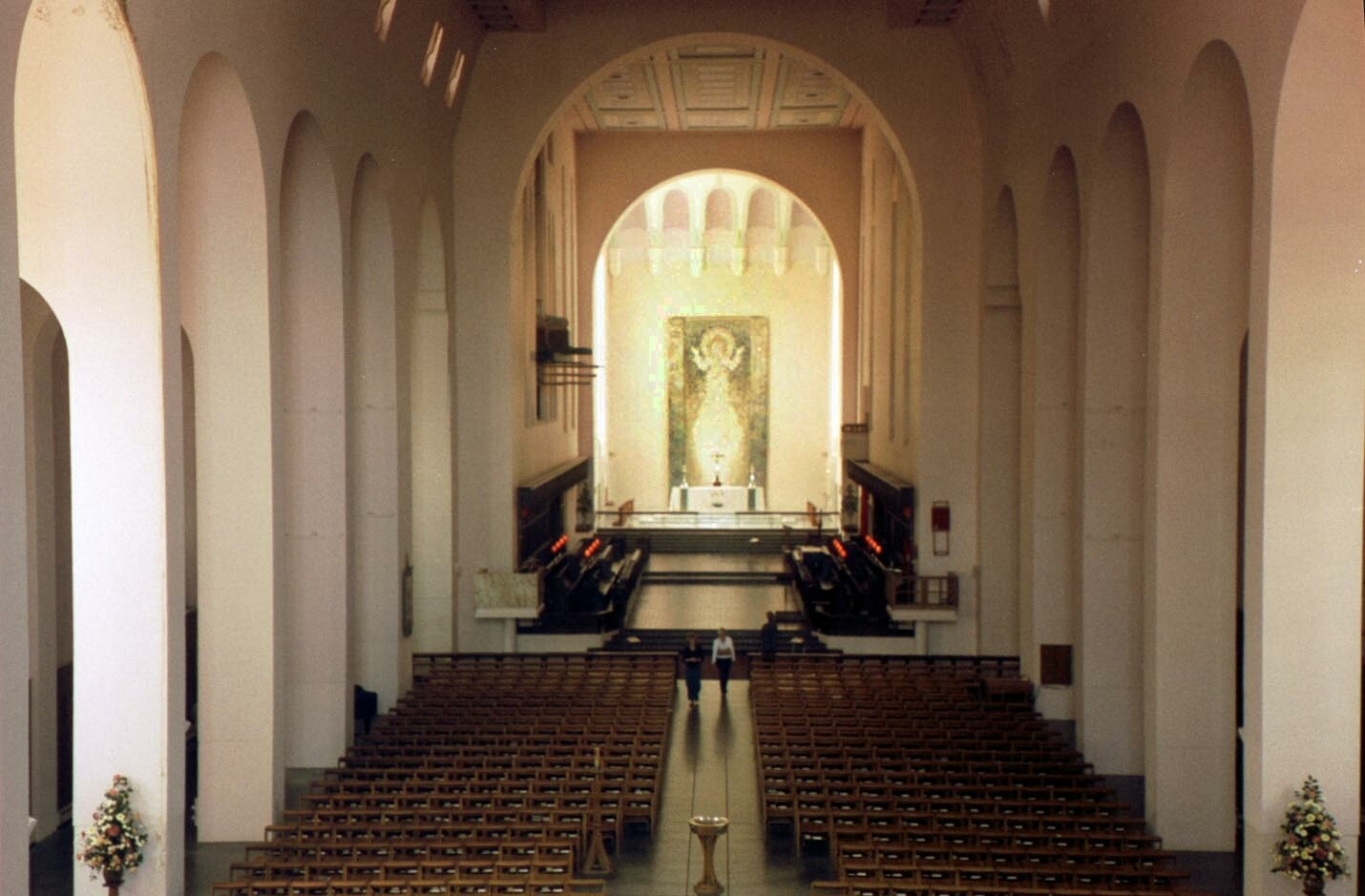
The nave. The font is placed in the centre.

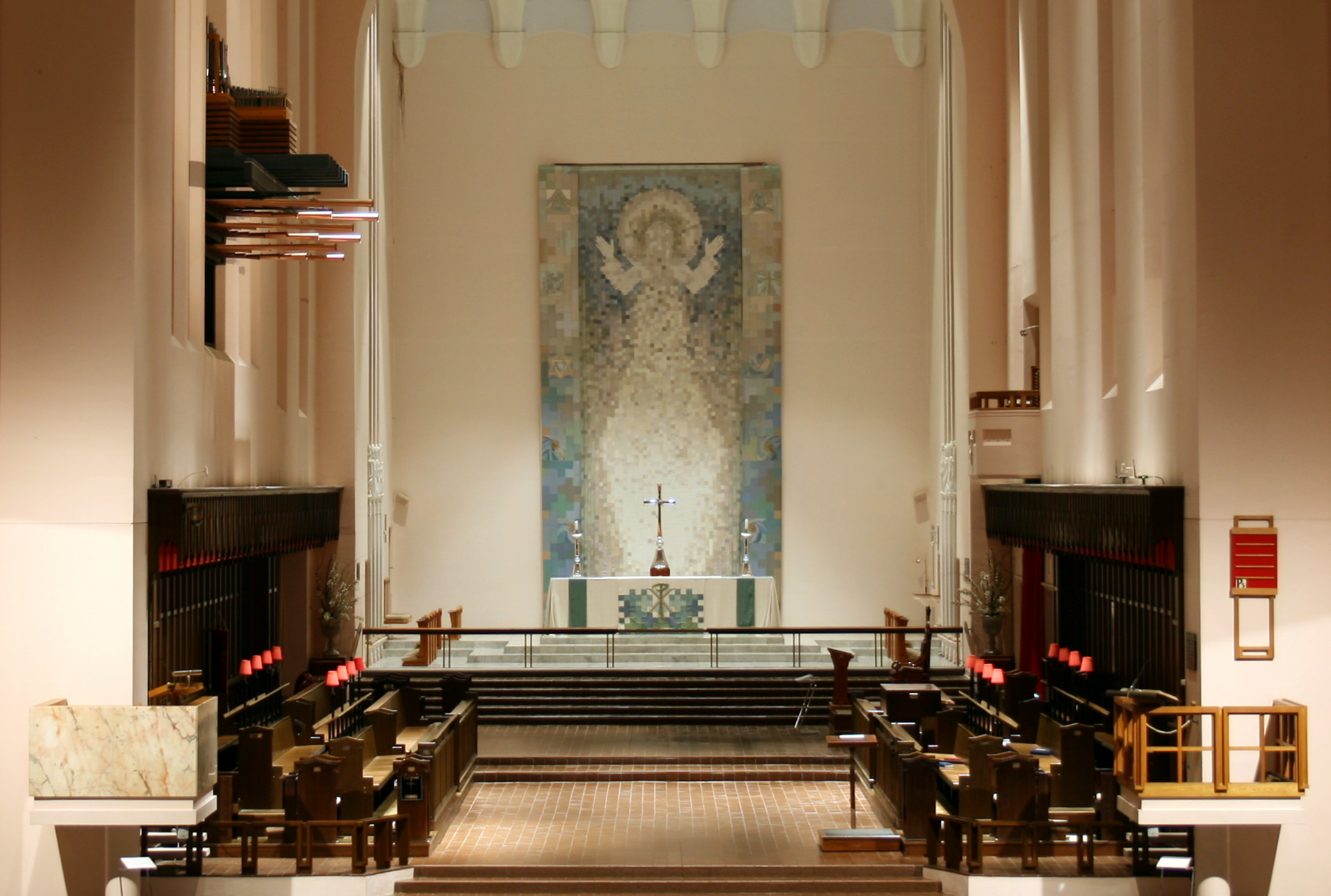
The chancel (sanctuary). The dossal hangs behind the altar.

== See also ==
- List of cathedrals in New Zealand
