= James Thomas (priest) =

Wales-born NZ-based priest (born 1918)

James Thomas ( 4 September 1918 – 2005) was Dean of Saint Paul's Cathedral, Wellington from 1978 to 1985.

Thomas was born on 4 September 1918 in Wales. He was educated at St David's College, Lampeter and Selwyn College, Cambridge; and ordained in 1942 or 1943 (sources differ). After curacies in Amroth and Laugharne he was a Chaplain to the British Armed Forces during World War II. When peace returned, he served a further curacy at Braunton and held incumbencies at Thornthwaite (England), Kensington (New Zealand), Otipua, Riccarton and Auckland. He was Archdeacon of Waitemata from 1972 until 1978. He had arrived in New Zealand in 1955.

He has one son and three daughters. Since 2020, his daughter Susan Thomas has been chief justice of the New Zealand High Court. He died in 2005 (https://ehive.com/collections/4366/objects/143558/photograph-colour-portrait-of-the-very-reverend-james-thomas-third-dean-of-wellington-19781985-in-w)
