= Frank Nelson (priest) =

South African-born Anglican priest (born 1955)

The Very Reverend Frank Nelson
- Dean of St Peter's Cathedral, Adelaide
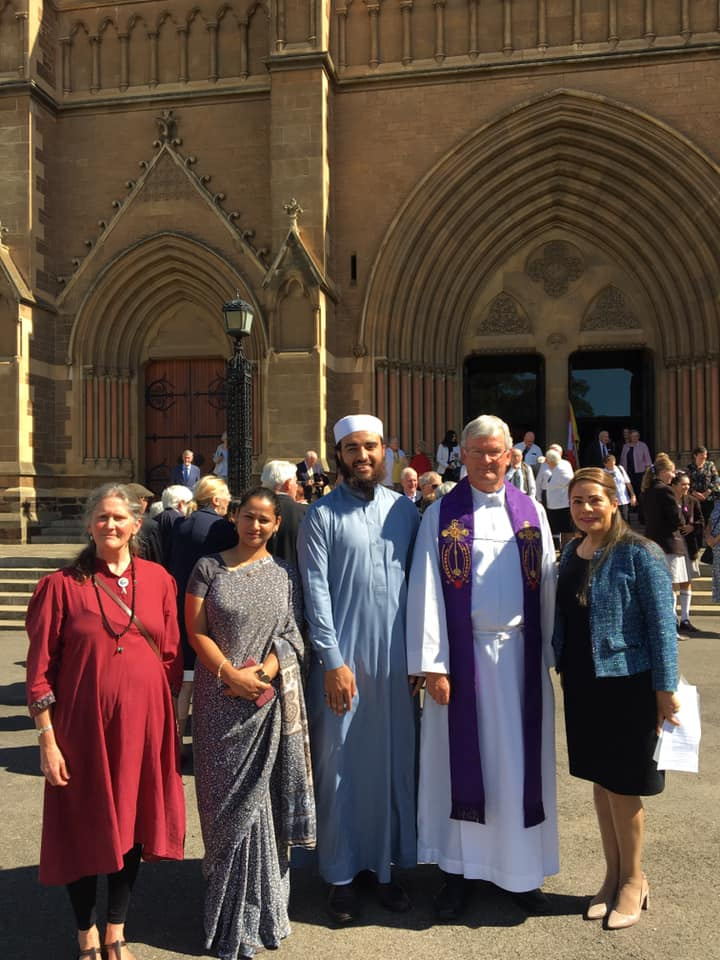
- Nelson (second from right) after a multi-faith service at St Peter's Cathedral, Adelaide (2021)
- Church: Anglican Church of Australia
- Province: South Australia
- Diocese: Adelaide
- In office: 12 October 2012 – 4 April 2021
- Predecessor: Sarah Macneil
- Successor: Chris McLeod
- Other post: Dean of Wellington (2004–2012)

Orders
- Ordination: 1978 (as priest)

Personal details
- Born: Frank Derek Nelson; January 9, 1955 (age 71) Union of South Africa
- Spouse: Christine
- Children: 3

Frank Derek Nelson (born 9 January 1955) is a South African-born Anglican priest who served as the Dean of Adelaide from 12 October 2012 to 4 April 2021, and previously served as Dean of Wellington from 2004 to 2012.

Nelson was born in what was then the Union of South Africa and grew up in East London. He was ordained in 1978, and moved to New Zealand in 1991 in response to apartheid. He worked in churches and cathedrals in South Africa, New Zealand, Hong Kong and Australia, before being invited by Archbishop Jeffrey Driver to become Dean of St Peter's Cathedral, Adelaide.

From 2004 to 2012, he was Dean of Wellington Cathedral of St Paul. His Master of Ministry (2010) was entitled "Benedict, Balance and the Deans: The Benedictine concept of balance offers a way for a dean to survive and thrive in an Anglican cathedral today".

Nelson retired from his role in Adelaide on 4 April 2021 to return to New Zealand and serve as vicar of the parish of North Wairoa (based out of Dargaville).

Nelson retired from active parish ministry in February 2024.

Nelson is married to Christine and has 3 children.
