= National Register of Historic Places listings in LaGrange County, Indiana =

Location of Lagrange County in Indiana

This is a list of the National Register of Historic Places listings in LaGrange County, Indiana.

This is intended to be a complete list of the properties and districts on the National Register of Historic Places in LaGrange County, Indiana, United States. Latitude and longitude coordinates are provided for many National Register properties and districts; these locations may be seen together in a map.

There are 10 properties and districts listed on the National Register in the county.

Another property was once listed but has been removed. Properties and districts located in incorporated areas display the name of the municipality, while properties and districts in unincorporated areas display the name of their civil township. Properties and districts split between multiple jurisdictions display the names of all jurisdictions.

This National Park Service list is complete through NPS recent listings posted August 29, 2025.

== Current listings ==
	Name on the Register	Image	Date listed	Location	City or town	Description
1	Bloomfield Township Graded School		November 15, 2022 (#100008412)	3020 East US 20; 41°38′30″N 85°22′04″W	Bloomfield Township	
2	John Badlam Howe Mansion	John Badlam Howe Mansion	September 14, 1995 (#95001106)	W. Union St. at Howe; 41°43′28″N 85°25′28″W	Lima Township	On the grounds of the Howe Military School.
3	La Grange County Courthouse	La Grange County Courthouse	July 17, 1980 (#80000042)	Detroit St. 41°38′40″N 85°25′07″W	LaGrange	
4	Olde Store (John O'Ferrell Store)	Olde Store (John O'Ferrell Store)	October 29, 1975 (#75000024)	West and 2nd Sts. at Mongo; 41°41′08″N 85°16′46″W	Springfield Township	
5	St. James Memorial Chapel	St. James Memorial Chapel	September 16, 2001 (#01000989)	State Road 9 at Howe, just south of County Road 600 N 41°43′28″N 85°25′29″W	Lima Township	On the grounds of the Howe Military School.
6	South Milford I.O.O.F. Hall		March 3, 2025 (#100011482)	8015 E 750 S 41°32′01″N 85°16′17″W	South Milford	
7	Star Milling and Electric Company Historic District	Star Milling and Electric Company Historic District	September 14, 1995 (#95001107)	Junction of County Roads 505 W and 700 N, northeast of Howe; 41°44′54″N 85°26′14″W	Lima Township	
8	Samuel P. Williams House	Samuel P. Williams House	August 11, 1980 (#80000043)	101 South St. at Howe; 41°43′19″N 85°25′07″W	Lima Township	
9	George and Margaret Wolcott House		March 4, 2020 (#100005042)	105 Wolcott St. 41°31′46″N 85°21′55″W	Wolcottville	
10	Menno Yoder Polygonal Barn	Menno Yoder Polygonal Barn	April 2, 1993 (#93000191)	8690 W250N, west of Shipshewana; 41°40′30″N 85°35′47″W	Newbury Township	

== Former listing ==
	Name on the Register	Image	Date listed	Date removed	Location	City or town	Description
1	Lima Township School		December 19, 1985 (#85003193)	June 18, 1986	Market and Broad Sts.	Howe	

== See also ==
- List of National Historic Landmarks in Indiana
- National Register of Historic Places listings in Indiana
- Listings in neighboring counties: Branch (MI), Elkhart, Noble, St. Joseph (MI), Steuben
- List of Indiana state historical markers in LaGrange County
