= Reginald Mallett =

American bishop (1893–1965)

The Right Reverend James Reginald Mallett S.T.D., D.D.
- Bishop of Northern Indiana
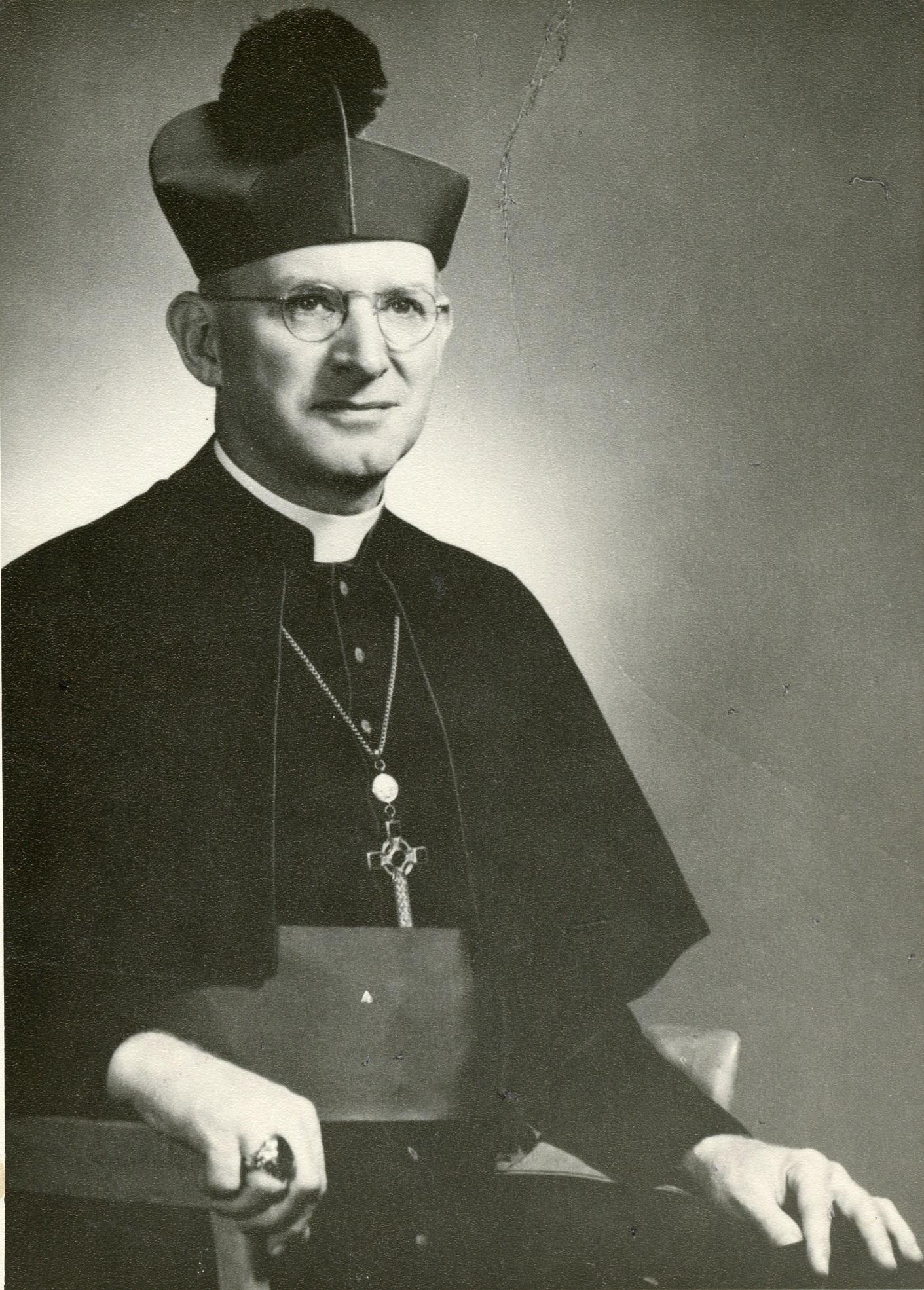
- Church: Episcopal Church
- Diocese: Northern Indiana
- Elected: July 26, 1944
- In office: 1944–1963
- Predecessor: Campbell Gray
- Successor: Walter C. Klein

Orders
- Ordination: December 1918 by Joseph Blount Cheshire
- Consecration: October 25, 1944 by Benjamin F. P. Ivins

Personal details
- Born: February 27, 1893 Cincinnati, Ohio, United States
- Died: February 14, 1965 (aged 71) Durham, North Carolina, United States
- Buried: St James' Memorial Chapel, Howe, Indiana
- Denomination: Anglican
- Parents: Frank James Mallett & Mary Emily Long
- Spouse: Lucy Atkinson Murchison (m. 1924)
- Children: 1
- Education: University of North Carolina

James Reginald Mallett (February 27, 1893 – February 14, 1965) was the third Bishop of the Episcopal Diocese of Northern Indiana.

== Early life and education ==
Mallett was born on February 27, 1893, in Cincinnati, Ohio, the son of the Reverend Frank James Mallett (1858-1944) and Mary Emily Long (1861-1938). He was educated at Erasmus Hall High School in New York City, before enrolling at the University of North Carolina from where he graduated with a Bachelor of Arts in 1915. He also studied at the General Theological Seminary, graduated with a Bachelor of Divinity in 1918, and was awarded a Doctor of Sacred Theology in 1945. Nashotah House awarded him an honorary Doctor of Divinity in 1944.

== Ordained ministry ==
Mallett was ordained deacon in May 1918 and priest in December 1918 by the Bishop of North Carolina Joseph Blount Cheshire. He then became priest-in-charge of the Mission in Walnut Cove, North Carolina. In 1922, he became rector of St John's Church in Wilmington, North Carolina, while in 1924, he was made a Canon of the Cathedral chapter of Trinity Cathedral, Cleveland, Ohio. Between 1928 and 1931, he served as rector of Holy Trinity Church in Greensboro, North Carolina, and between 1931 and 1932, he was rector of Christ Church in Chattanooga, Tennessee. In 1932, he became rector of Grace Church in White Plains, New York, and then rector of Grace and St. Peter's Church, Baltimore, Maryland in 1936, where he remained till 1944.

== Bishop ==
On July 26, 1944, Mallett was elected Bishop of Northern Indiana on the first ballot, during a special convention. He was consecrated on October 25, 1944, in St James' Church, South Bend, Indiana. During his episcopacy, St James' would become the diocesan cathedral (1957). Mallett was episcopal visitor to St. Gregory's Abbey, Three Rivers, Michigan and served as Superior-General of the American Branch of the Confraternity of the Blessed Sacrament from 1946 to 1965. He retired on October 29, 1963, due to failing health. He is buried in St. James Memorial Chapel, Howe, Indiana.
