= Lima Township, LaGrange County, Indiana =

Lima Township
- Township
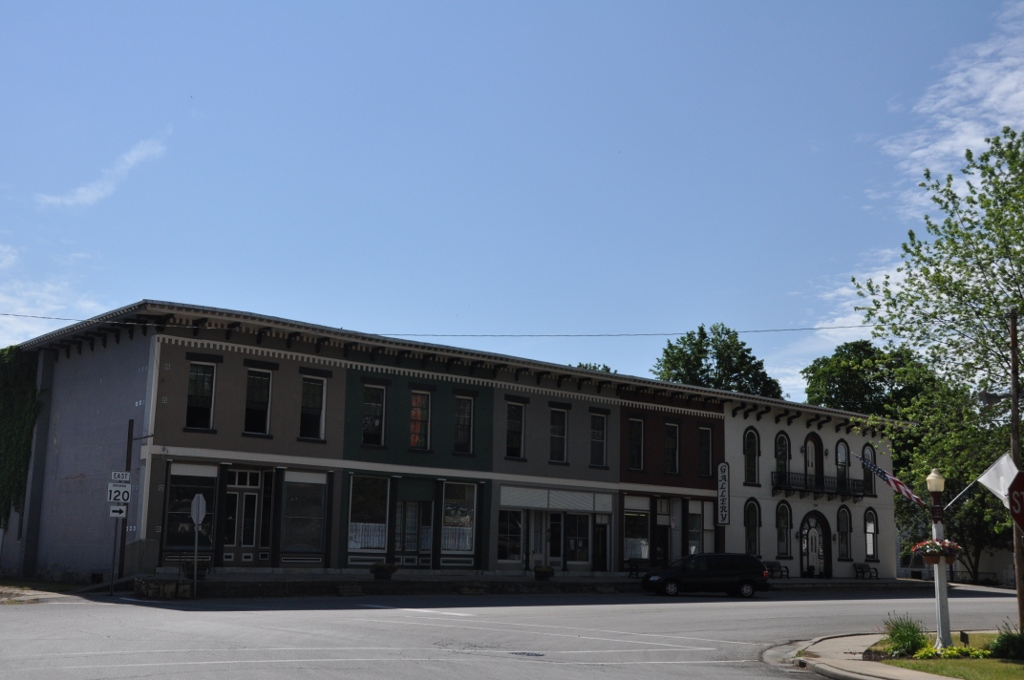
- Shops in the center of Howe, one of the township's villages

- Coordinates: 41°43′48″N 85°25′32″W
- Country: United States
- State: Indiana
- County: LaGrange

Government
  - Type: Indiana township

Area
  - Total: 25.1 sq mi (65 km^{2})
  - Land: 24.45 sq mi (63.3 km^{2})
  - Water: 0.65 sq mi (1.7 km^{2})
- Elevation: 879 ft (268 m)

Population (2020)
  - Total: 2,383
  - Density: 102.5/sq mi (39.6/km^{2})
- FIPS code: 18-43722
- GNIS feature ID: 453569

Historical population
| Census | Pop. | Note | %± |
|---|---|---|---|
| 1930 | 1,081 | | — |
| 1940 | 1,058 | | −2.1% |
| 1950 | 1,141 | | 7.8% |
| 1960 | 1,287 | | 12.8% |
| 1970 | 1,664 | | 29.3% |
| 1980 | 1,889 | | 13.5% |
| 1990 | 2,294 | | 21.4% |
| 2000 | 2,387 | | 4.1% |
| 2010 | 2,507 | | 5.0% |
| 2020 | 2,383 | | −4.9% |
U.S. Census:

Lima Township is one of eleven townships in LaGrange County, Indiana, United States. As of the 2020 census, its population was 2,383 (down from 2,507 at 2010) and it contained 1,014 housing units. It contains the census-designated place of Howe.

== History ==
Lima Township was established in 1832.

John Badlam Howe Mansion, St. James Memorial Chapel, Star Milling and Electric Company Historic District, and Samuel P. Williams House are listed on the National Register of Historic Places.

== Geography ==
According to the 2010 census, the township has a total area of 25.1 square miles (65 km^{2}), of which 24.45 square miles (63.3 km^{2}) (or 97.41%) is land and 0.65 square miles (1.7 km^{2}) (or 2.59%) is water.
