= St. Augustine's Episcopal Church (Gary, Indiana) =

Historic church in Indiana, United States

- U.S. National Register of Historic Places
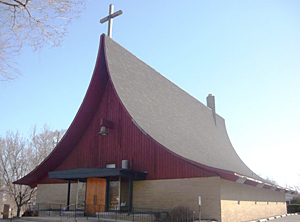
- Viewed from the west

- Location within Indiana Location within the United States
- Location: 2425 West 19th Ave., Gary, Indiana
- Coordinates: 41.584246°N 87.368386°W
- Built: 1958
- Architect: Edward D. Dart
- Architectural style: Modern
- NRHP reference No.: 13000758
- Added to NRHP: September 18, 2013

St. Augustine's Episcopal Church in Gary, Indiana, is a historically black congregation and building in the Episcopal Diocese of Northern Indiana. The congregation was chartered in 1927. The current building, constructed in 1958, was listed on the National Register of Historic Places in 2013. It was nominated for listing by parishioner Paula M. DeBois and approved by the State Historic Preservation Officer.

== Congregation ==
The historically black parish was chartered in 1927 by thirty African American professionals as a Colored Episcopal Mission. St. Augustine's original home was at 19th and Adams in Gary's Midtown section in an old Roman Catholic mission building. The first service in the congregation's new home was held on May 8, 1959.

Initially the church struggled to hold regular services and maintain attendance. Only seventeen people attended the first service, and for the first decade of the congregation's existence, it was only able to attract part-time priests. In 1938 Episcopal Bishop Campbell Gray assigned Benedictine monks of St. Gregory's Abbey, Three Rivers to serve the struggling mission, and they remained with the church until 1946, two years after Gray's death. A retired rector named the Rev. Peter Langendorff headed the church for the next few years until in 1951 the Rev. Wallace L. Wells, spouse of Henrietta Bell Wells and newly ordained, assumed leadership.

During the 1950s many African-Americans that moved to Gary did so as part of the Great Migration, seeking employment opportunities that were kept from them in the South, and many of these newly relocated African-Americans joined St. Augustine's. With this influx, the congregation grew enough so that by 1955, the church was growing too large to remain in its rented Catholic Mission home. While inquiring about a pipe organ to use in services, the organ sales representative suggested the congregation ask Edward D. Dart, now known as a prolific architect, to design a new building for the congregation. Dart had designed many residential homes in suburban Chicago and had designed one other church in 1953 (St. Michael's Episcopal Church in Barrington, Illinois) before St. Augustine's. Though having Dart design the building is significant in and of itself, the fact that the congregation was able to commission his services is even more significant since they were an African American congregation and Dart was white, a rare combination during segregation.

Dart was asked to design a building with a budget of $120,000, which the church was able to afford thanks to a $45,000 cash fund and a $20,000 grant from the National Council of the Protestant Church. Dart's initial design far exceeded this budget with large, ornate stained glass windows that cost $10,000 each, and the parish swiftly rejected it, preferring a more modest, minimalist design. Drawing upon this information, Dart produced a second custom design that was eventually agreed to by the congregation's leadership after discussions that lasted several years.

A new building was constructed from Dart's designs in 1958 at the corner of 19th and Ellsworth in the Tolleston section of Gary, and immediately attracted widespread recognition. In 1960 the building won awards from the American Institute of Architects and the Church Architectural Guild. Several magazines and newspapers including the Chicago Tribune ran articles about the building shortly after its completion due to its perceived architectural beauty, but few mentioned the fact that the congregation it housed was African American. Most of the pictures published about the building omitted any of the church's members.

St. Augustine's advanced to parish status in 1961, a full two years after the new building was completed.

=== Pastors/Rectors ===
- Wallace Lewis Wells (1951–1963)
- Dr. Robert Earl Hood (1963–1967)
- William James Walker (1967–1968)
- Joseph W. Riggs (1970–1975)
- James Donald Manning (1978–1982)
- H. Fitz-Roy Henderson Thompson (1983–1989)
- David Lee Hyndman (1991–2018)

== Building ==
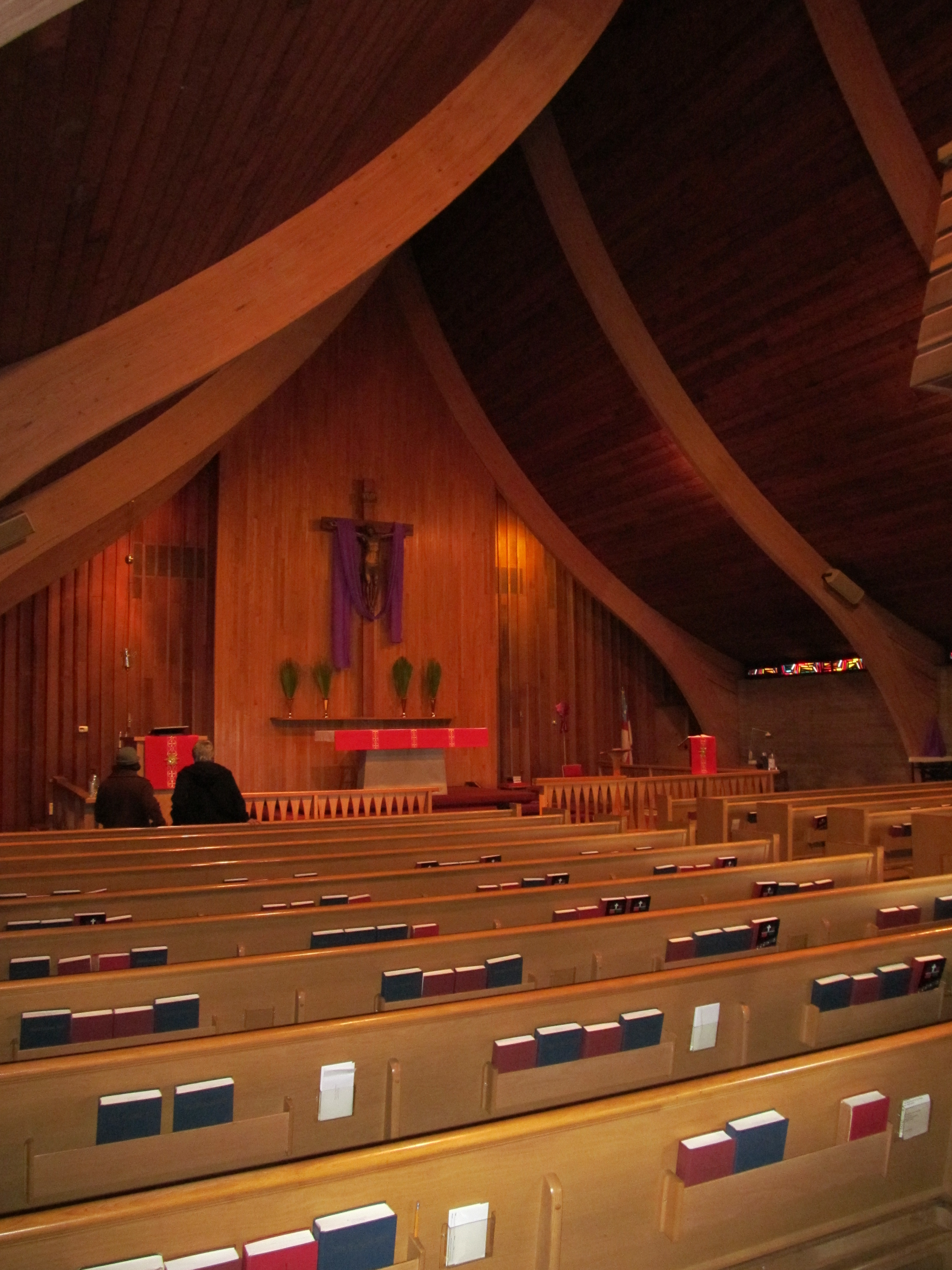
St. Augustine's Episcopal Church Interior

Designed by renowned Mid-Century Modern architect Edward D. Dart, FAIA in 1958, the architecturally significant church garnered two architectural awards shortly after its construction. St. Augustine's successfully employs the use of Indiana limestone, wood and stained glass clerestory windows. The building was the first of Dart's commissioned designs to be nominated to the National Register of Historic Places; it was listed on September 18, 2013. At the time of the listing, St. Augustine's was Gary's only modern church structure constructed after the Second World War. In 2012, the congregation was also given a $2,000 African American Heritage Grant from Indiana Landmarks to aid it in its building preservation efforts.

== Sources ==
- Dart, Susan (1993). Edward Dart Architect. ISBN 1-879260-09-3.
- "Like Praying Hands." Chicago Sunday Tribune Magazine 27 Dec. 1959: 16. Print.
- "St. Augustine’s Episcopal Presents Unusual Form." The Post Tribune 14 May 1960: 7.Print.
- Wells, Wallace L. "Prayerful and Militant." The Living Church 140.3 (1960): 12.Print.
- Dart, Edward, Collection, 1841-1993 (bulk 1940-1993)
