= St. James Memorial Chapel (Howe, Indiana) =

- U.S. National Register of Historic Places
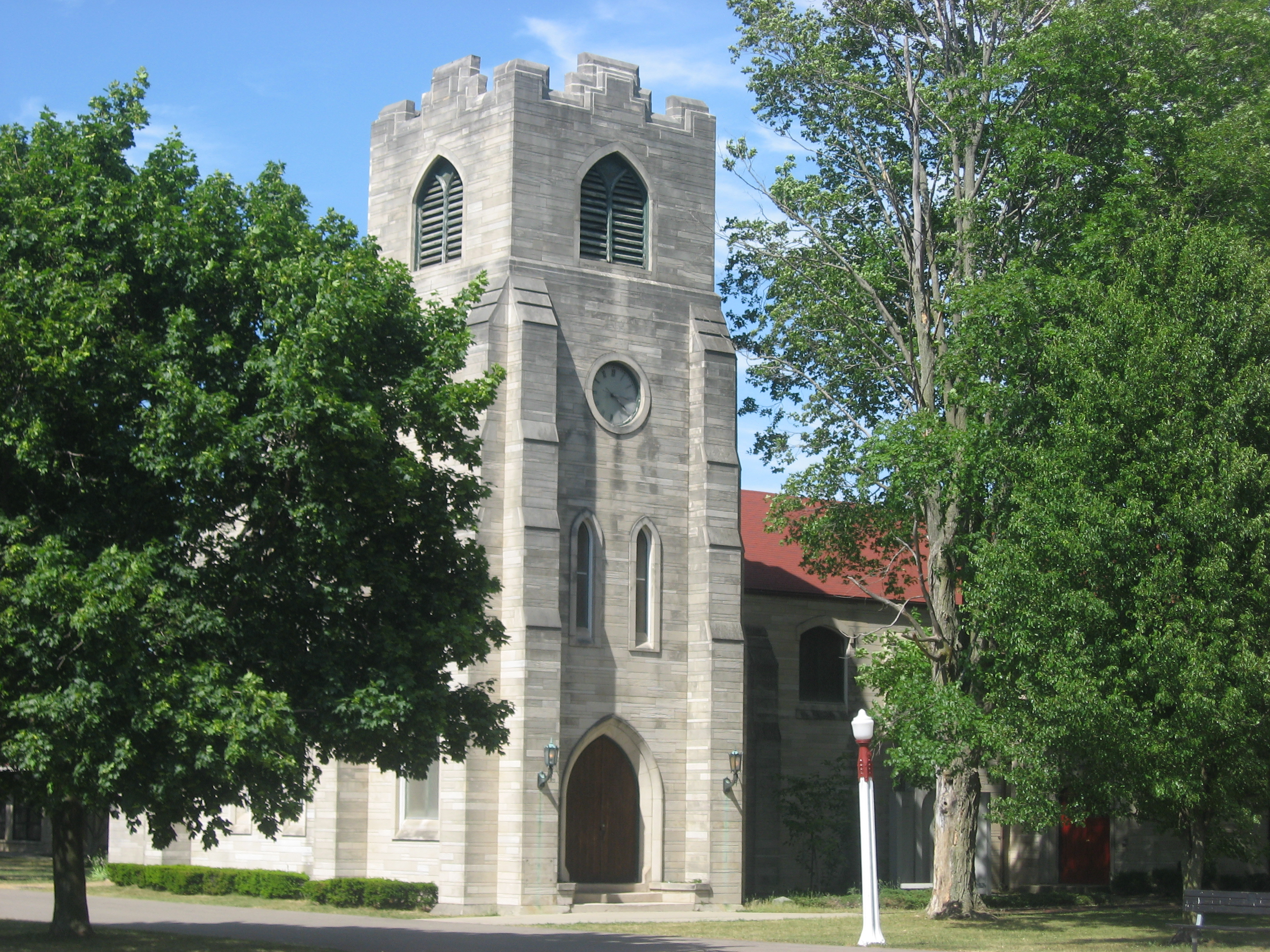

- Location within Indiana Location within the United States
- Location: IN 9, just S of Cty Rd. 600 N., Howe Military School; Howe, Indiana
- Coordinates: 41°43′27.72″N 85°25′29.33″W
- Area: less than one acre
- Built: 1902
- Architect: Sutcliffe, John
- Architectural style: Tudor Revival
- NRHP reference No.: 01000989
- Added to NRHP: September 16, 2001

St. James Memorial Chapel is a former Episcopal chapel located on the grounds of Howe Military School, in Howe, Indiana. It was built in 1902, and is a one-story, Tudor Revival style brick building sheathed with a limestone veneer. It measures 152 feet by 64 feet, and has additions made in 1909, 1914 (Mother's Chapel), and 1955. The building features a two-story, crenellated corner tower.

It was listed in the National Register of Historic Places on September 16, 2001. In 2016 the Episcopal Diocese of Northern Indiana disassociated and ended the relationship between the Episcopal Church and Howe Military School. The Chapel is no longer under the care of the Episcopal Church and cannot be regarded as Episcopal.

== Chapel crypt burials ==
Buried in the chapel's crypt are the founders of Howe Military School, John Badlam Howe, (1812–1883) and Frances Marie (Glidden) Howe, his wife. Also buried there are the first four bishops of the Episcopal Diocese of Northern Indiana and the wives of three of them, as follows:

- 1. John Hazen White (1849–1925), first bishop, (and also the fourth bishop of the Episcopal Diocese of Indiana and his wife, Louise (Holbrook) White (1858–1928);
- 2. Campbell Gray (1879–1944), second bishop, and his wife, Virginia (Morgan) Gray (1886–1978);
- 3. Reginald Mallett (1893–1965), third bishop, and his wife, Lucy Atkinson Murchison Mallett (1898–1959); and
- 4. Walter C. Klein, fourth bishop (1904–1980).

== Other local sites on the National Register of Historic Places ==
Other sites in Howe on the National register are:

- John Badlam Howe Mansion, which is also known as the Howe Military School Rectory or the Administration Building, located next to the chapel
- Lima Township School
- Star Milling and Electric Company Historic District
- Samuel P. Williams House

== See also ==
- List of Registered Historic Places in Indiana
