= John Hazen White =

American bishop

The Right Reverend John Hazen White
- Bishop of Northern Indiana
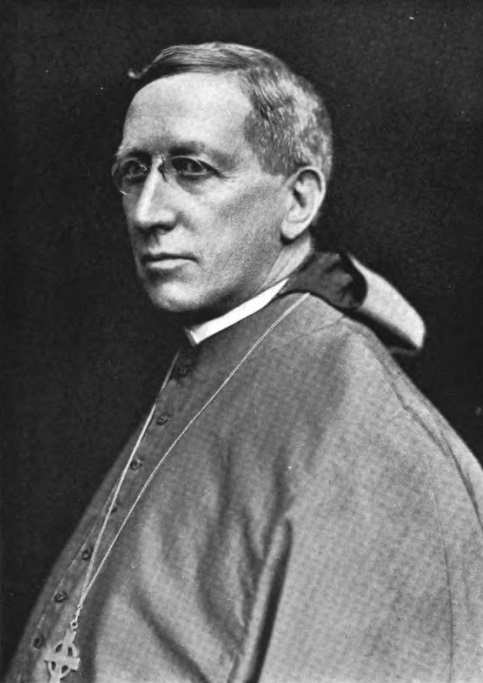
- Church: Episcopal Church
- Diocese: Northern Indiana
- Elected: 1899
- In office: 1899–1925
- Successor: Campbell Gray
- Previous post: Bishop of Indiana (1860-1865)

Orders
- Ordination: May 28, 1876 by John Williams
- Consecration: May 1, 1895 by Daniel S. Tuttle

Personal details
- Born: March 10, 1849 Cincinnati, Ohio, United States]
- Died: March 16, 1925 (aged 76) Seabreeze, Florida, United States
- Buried: St. James Memorial Chapel (Howe, Indiana)
- Denomination: Anglican
- Parents: Moses Hazen White & Mary Miller Williams
- Spouse: Marie Louise Holbrook
- Children: 7
- Education: Kenyon College
- Signature: John Hazen White's signature

John Hazen White (March 10, 1849 – March 16, 1925) was an episcopal bishop in Indiana and the first bishop of Northern Indiana in The Episcopal Church.

== Biography ==
White was born in Cincinnati, Ohio on March 10, 1849, the son of Moses Hazen White and Mary Miller Williams. He was educated at the public schools of Cincinnati, graduating from Woodward High in 1867. He then entered Kenyon College, from where he earned a Bachelor of Arts in 1872. In 1875, he graduated with a Bachelor of Divinity, after studying at Berkeley Divinity School.

White was ordained deacon on June 4, 1875, and priest on May 28, 1876. He then became assistant rector of St Andrew's Church in Meriden, Connecticut, while in 1878 he became rector of Grace Church in Old Saybrook, Connecticut and in 1881 of Christ Church in Joliet, Illinois. He married Marie Louise Holbrook on April 23, 1879, and together they had seven children.

White was elected Bishop of Indiana on February 6, 1895, on the first ballot. He was consecrated on May 1, 1895, by Presiding Bishop Daniel S. Tuttle. With the creation of the Diocese of Michigan City in 1898, White was elected to serve as its first bishop, where he was installed on April 25, 1899. In 1912, he took upon himself the rectorship of St James' Church in South Bend, Indiana, a post he retained till 1920. White died in office on March 16, 1925, in Seabreeze, Florida, where he had been spending the winter. He died as a result of a heart disease, followed a period of ill health.
