= Francis Campbell Gray =

American bishop

The Right Reverend Francis Campbell Gray D.D.
- Bishop of Northern Indiana
- Church: Episcopal Church
- Diocese: Northern Indiana
- Elected: May 10, 1986
- In office: 1987–1998
- Predecessor: William C. R. Sheridan
- Successor: Edward S. Little II
- Previous post: Coadjutor Bishop of Northern Indiana (1986-1987)

Orders
- Ordination: December 20, 1969 by William L. Hargrave
- Consecration: October 31, 1986 by Edmond L. Browning

Personal details
- Born: June 27, 1940 (age 86) Manila, Philippines
- Denomination: Anglican
- Spouse: Karen Brumbaugh (m. 1965)
- Children: 3
- Education: Nashotah House; Rollins College

Francis "Frank" Campbell Gray Jr. (born June 27, 1940) was the sixth bishop of the Episcopal Diocese of Northern Indiana, serving from 1987 to 1998. He was elected coadjutor in 1986 and later served as assistant bishop of Virginia.

== Early life, family, and education ==
Gray was born on June 27, 1940, in Manila, the Philippines, the son of the Reverend Francis Campbell Gray and Jane Elizabeth Greenwell. His grandfather was Campbell Gray who served as the second Bishop of Northern Indiana, while his great-grandfather was William Crane Gray who served as the Missionary Bishop of Southern Florida.

He was educated at Rollins College in Winter Park, Florida and graduated in 1966. He then studied at Nashotah House where he received his Bachelor of Divinity in 1969, and a Master of Sacred Theology in 1979. He married Karen Brumbaugh on February 19, 1965, and together had three children.

== Ordained ministry ==
Gray was ordained deacon on June 20, 1969, and priest on December 20, 1969, on both occasions by Bishop William L. Hargrave. He served as assistant at St Wilfred's Church in Sarasota, Florida from 1969 to 1970, and then chaplain of Manatee Junior College in Bradenton, Florida from 1970 to 1974. In 1974, he became rector of St John's Church in Melbourne, Florida, while in 1979, he transferred to Orlando, Florida, to serve as rector of Emmanuel Church.

== Bishop ==
Gray was elected Coadjutor Bishop of Northern Indiana on the fourteenth ballot on May 10, 1986. He was consecrated in the Basilica of the Sacred Heart at the University of Notre Dame on October 31, 1986, by Presiding Bishop Edmond L. Browning. He succeeded as diocesan on January 10, 1987. Despite his conservative stance, and the traditionalist approach of the diocese, Gray eventually allowed the ordination of women in his diocese, and was the first bishop of Northern Indiana to ordained a woman in the diocese, for the diocese. He retired in 1998, and became the Assistant Bishop of Virginia on January 1, 1999. He retired from Virginia in 2005.
