= Mongo, Indiana =

- Unincorporated community
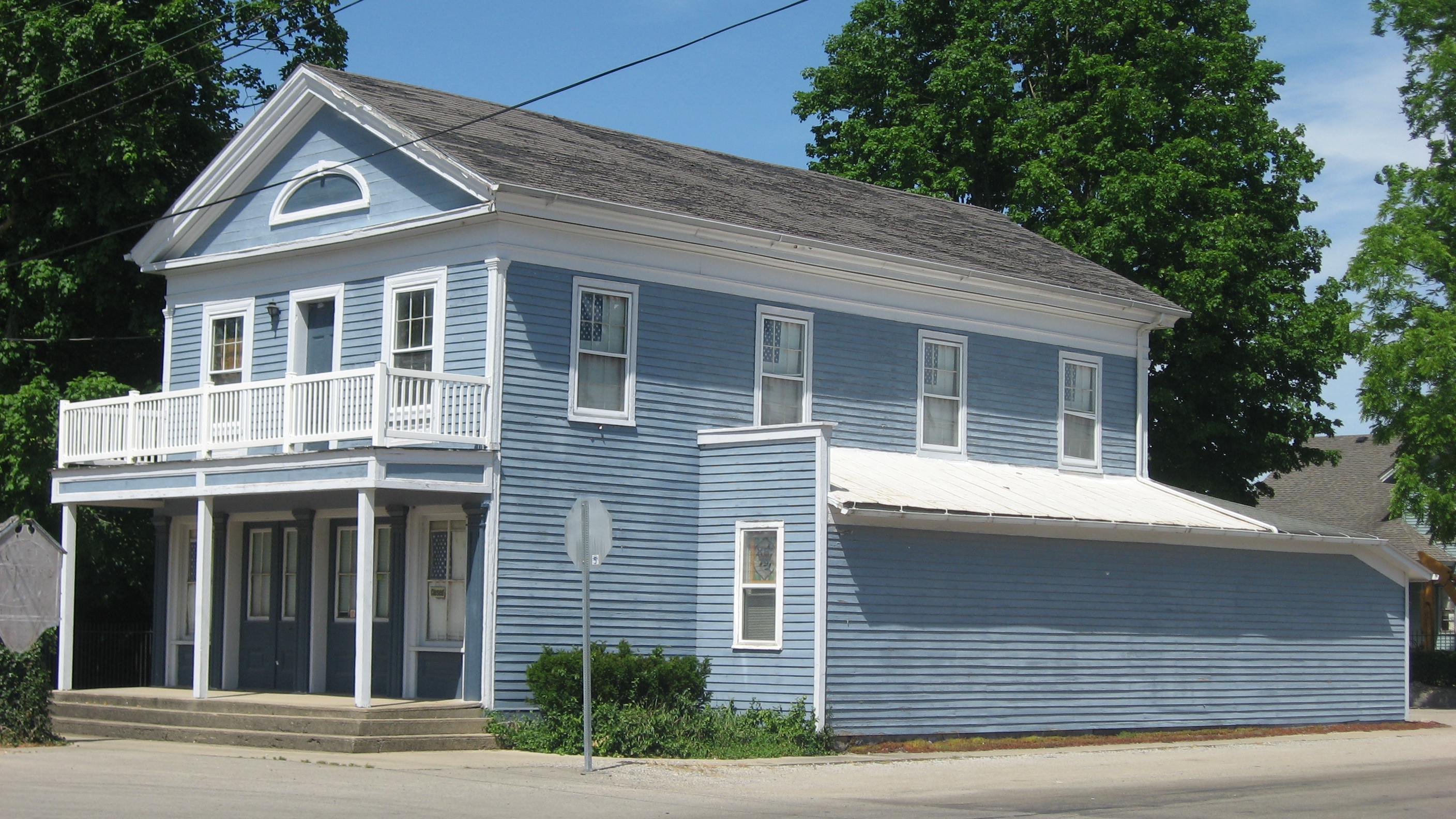
- Mongo's "Olde Store"

- Location within Indiana Location within the United States
- Coordinates: 41°41′03″N 85°16′42″W
- Country: United States
- State: Indiana
- County: LaGrange
- Township: Springfield
- Elevation: 906 ft (276 m)

Population (2010)
  - Total: 105
- ZIP code: 46771
- FIPS code: 18-50094
- GNIS feature ID: 2830436

Mongo is an unincorporated community in Springfield Township, LaGrange County, Indiana. The population in 2010 was 105.

== History ==
Mongo was originally called Mongoquinong, and under the latter name was laid out in 1840. Mongoquinong was later shortened to Mongo. Although An Illustrated Historical Atlas of LaGrange County, Indiana (1874) translates the native name as 'Big Squaw Village', it is thought to be a corruption of the Miami-Illinois maankwahkionka, meaning 'in the Loon Land'.

The John O'Ferrell Store was listed in the National Register of Historic Places in 1975.

== Geography ==
Mongo is the site of "The Olde Store" (a.k.a. "John O'Ferrell Store" or the "Mongo Trading Post"), on the National Register of Historic Places.

== Demographics ==
The United States Census Bureau defined Mongo as a census designated place in the 2022 American Community Survey.
