= St. Gregory's Abbey =

St. Gregory's Abbey may refer to:

- St. Gregory's Abbey (Oklahoma) in Shawnee, Oklahoma
- St. Gregory's Abbey, Three Rivers in Michigan
