= Walter C. Klein =

American bishop

The Right Reverend Walter Conrad Klein Ph.D., S.T.D.
- Bishop of Northern Indiana
- Church: Episcopal Church
- Diocese: Northern Indiana
- Elected: March 13, 1963
- In office: 1963–1972
- Predecessor: Reginald Mallett
- Successor: William C. R. Sheridan
- Previous post: Coadjutor Bishop of Northern Indiana (1963)

Orders
- Ordination: June 24, 1928 by Sheldon Munson Griswold
- Consecration: June 29, 1963 by William A. Brown

Personal details
- Born: May 28, 1904 Brooklyn, New York, United States
- Died: March 1, 1980 (aged 75) LaPorte, Indiana, United States
- Buried: St James' Memorial Chapel, Howe, Indiana
- Denomination: Anglican
- Parents: Louis William Klein & Lilly A. Sommer
- Spouse: Helene Rosentreter (m. 1935)
- Children: 2
- Education: Lehigh University

Walter Conrad Klein (May 28, 1904 – March 1, 1980) was bishop of the Episcopal Diocese of Northern Indiana from 1963 to 1971.

== Early life and education ==
Klein was born in Brooklyn, New York, on May 28, 1904, the son of Louis William Klein and Lilly A. Sommer. He was educated at the High School of Pottsville, Pennsylvania, and then at Lehigh University, from where he graduated with a Bachelor of Arts in 1924. He then studied at the General Theological Seminary and earned a Bachelor of Divinity in 1929, a Master of Sacred Theology in 1932, and a Doctor of Sacred Theology in 1933. He later received a Doctor of Philosophy in Semitic languages from Columbia University in 1940. In 1935, Klein married Helene Rosentreter (1905–2000) and together they had two children.

== Ordained ministry ==
Klein was ordained deacon on May 17, 1927, by Bishop Ethelbert Talbot, and priest on June 24, 1928, by Bishop Sheldon Munson Griswold. He served as assistant priest at the Church of St Mary the Virgin in New York City between 1930 and 1934, and curate at Grace Church in Newark, New Jersey. In 1937, he became vicar of St Augustine's Church in Norristown, Pennsylvania, and also accepted the post of lecturer at the Philadelphia Divinity School. In 1938, he became chairman of the graduate department of the Philadelphia Divinity School, where he remained till 1942. Between 1942 and 1943, he served as rector of St Barnabas' Church in Haddington, Philadelphia. He also served as a naval chaplain during WWII between 1943 and 1946. After the war, he joined the staff of the Anglican Bishop of Jerusalem and became a canon of the Cathedral chapter of St George's Cathedral in Jerusalem in 1948. He resigned the post in 1950 to become a professor of Old Testament Literature and Languages at Seabury-Western Theological Seminary. He also served as the seminary's assistant dean between 1952 and 1959. In 1959, he was elected Dean of Nashotah House, and retained the post till 1963.

== Episcopacy ==
On March 13, 1963, during a diocesan special convention, Klein was elected on the third ballot Coadjutor Bishop of Northern Indiana. He was consecrated on June 29, 1963, by the Bishop of Southern Virginia William A. Brown. He succeeded as diocesan on November 1, 1963. Klein retired on June 23, 1972. He died of cancer in LaPorte, Indiana, on March 1, 1980.

== Author ==
Klein is the author of various publications, notably:

- The Elucidation of Islam's Foundation (1940)
- Johann Conrad Beissel: Mystic and Martinet (1942)
- The Syrian Orthodox Liturgy (1953)
- Clothed With Salvation: A Book of Counsel for Seminarians (1953)
- A Priest Forever (1964)
