= List of Indiana state historical markers in LaGrange County =

Location of LaGrange County in Indiana

This is a list of the Indiana state historical markers in LaGrange County.

This is intended to be a detailed table of the official state historical marker placed in LaGrange County, Indiana, United States by the Indiana Historical Bureau. The location of the historical marker and its latitude and longitude coordinates are included below when available, along with its name, year of placement, and topics as recorded by the Historical Bureau. There is 1 historical marker located in LaGrange County.

== Historical marker ==
Marker title	Image	Year placed	Location	Topics
The La Grange Phalanx		1966	U.S. Route 20, 0.7 miles east of its junction with State Road 3 west of Brushy Prairie; 41°38′31″N 85°15′54″W	Historic District, Neighborhoods, and Towns

== See also ==
- List of Indiana state historical markers
- National Register of Historic Places listings in LaGrange County, Indiana
