= Diocese of Northern Indiana =

Episcopal Church diocese in the US

Diocese of Northern Indiana Diœcesis Indianensis Septentrionalis

Location
- Country: United States
- Territory: The Indiana counties of Adams, Allen, Benton, Blackford, Carroll, Cass, DeKalb, Elkhart, Fulton, Grant, Howard, Huntington, Jasper, Jay, Kosciusko, LaGrange, Lake, LaPorte, Marshall, Miami, Newton, Noble, Porter, Pulaski, St. Joseph, Starke, Steuben, Wabash, Wells, White, and Whitley
- Ecclesiastical province: Province V

Statistics
- Congregations: 30 (2025)
- Members: 2,703 (2025)

Information
- Denomination: Episcopal Church
- Established: April 25, 1899
- Cathedral: Cathedral of St James

Current leadership
- Bishop: Douglas Sparks

Map
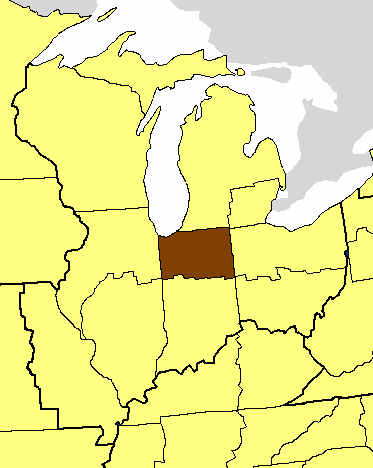
- Location of the Diocese of Northern Indiana

Website
- ednin.org

The Episcopal Diocese of Northern Indiana, originally called the Episcopal Diocese of Michigan City, is the diocese of the Episcopal Church in the United States of America with jurisdiction over the northern one-third of Indiana. It is in Province 5 and its cathedral, the Cathedral of St. James, is in South Bend, as are the diocesan offices.

In 2025, the diocese reported average Sunday attendance (ASA) of 1,110 persons, a relative decline from 1,982 in 2015. Membership decreased from 4,090 reported in 2015 to 2,703 in 2025. The 30 filing congregations of the diocese reported $3,546,425 of plate and pledge income in 2025.

== Description ==
The Episcopal Diocese of Northern Indiana has 29 parishes and missions in 31 counties of northern Indiana. Except for Tippecanoe County, all counties in the state straddling or lying north of 40º 30' North latitude are in the diocese. Fort Wayne is the largest city in the diocese followed by South Bend, Gary, and Elkhart. Cities in the diocese with more than one parish are Fort Wayne and South Bend with three each; and Elkhart and Gary with two.

== History ==
In October, 1888, the General Convention of the Episcopal Church in the United States of America approved splitting the Episcopal Diocese of Indiana into the Episcopal Diocese of Michigan City covering the northern one-third of the state and the Episcopal Diocese of Indianapolis covering the rest. John Hazen White, the Bishop of Indiana at the time elected to become bishop of Michigan City and was consecrated on April 25, 1899. A new bishop was elected for Indianapolis and he was consecrated September 21, 1899.

== Bishop of the Episcopal Diocese of Northern Indiana ==
=== Current bishop ===
Doug Sparks is the eighth and current bishop of the diocese.

=== List of bishops ===
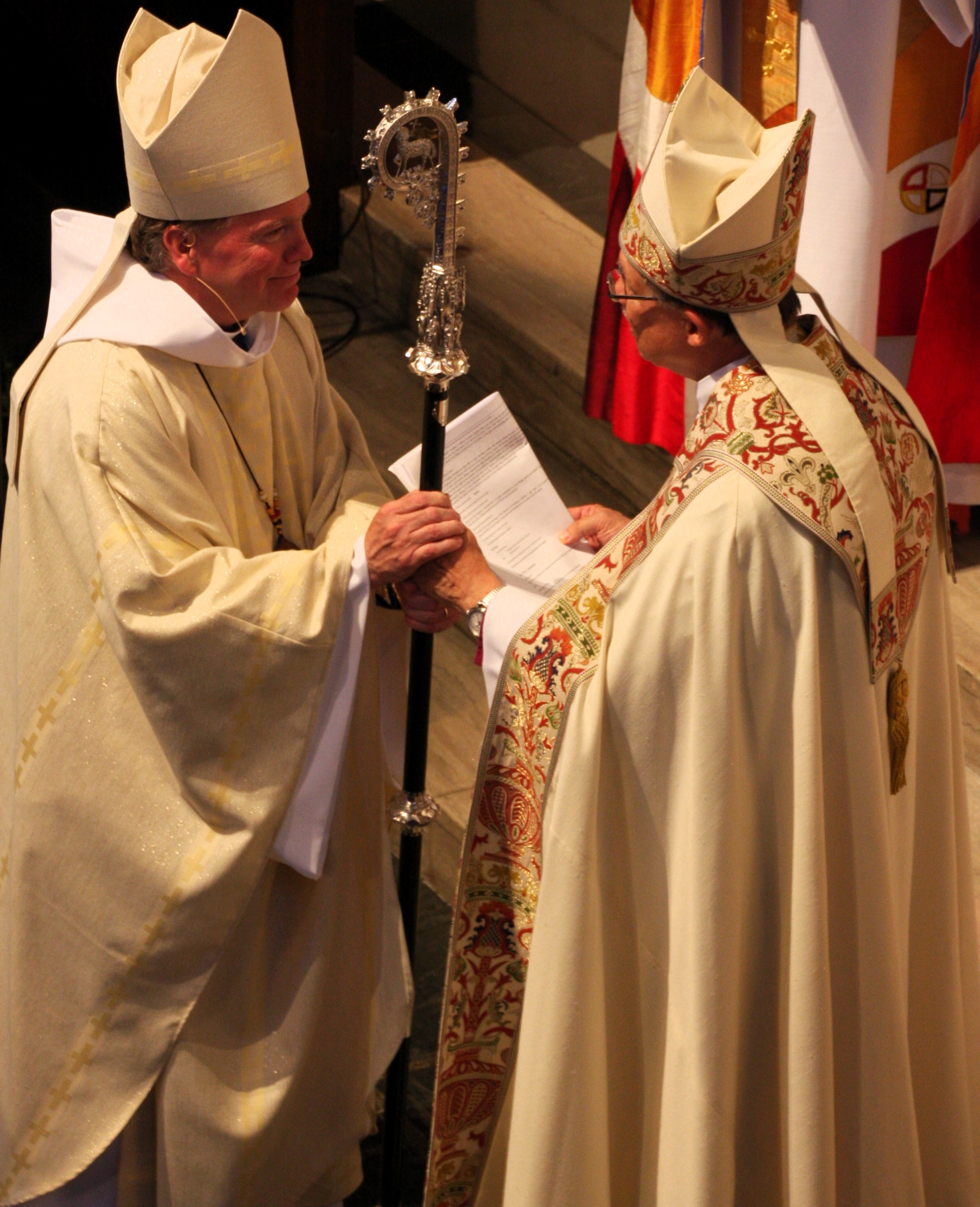
Doug Sparks, 8th bishop, receiving the crozier from his predecessor, Edward S. Little II

The bishops of Northern Indiana have been:

- 1. John Hazen White 1899–1925 (deceased) was previously 4th Bishop of Indiana
- 2. Campbell Gray 1925–1944 (deceased)
- 3. Reginald Mallett 1944–1963 (deceased)
- 4. Walter Conrad Klein 1963–1972 (deceased)
- 5. William C. R. Sheridan 1972–87 (deceased)
- 6. Francis Campbell Gray 1987–1998 elected coadjutor 1986, grandson of No. 2 and later Asst. Bishop of Virginia
- 7. Edward S. Little II 2000–2016
- 8. Douglas Sparks 2016–present

== St. James Memorial Chapel ==
The first four bishops of Northern Indiana are buried in the crypt of St. James Memorial Chapel on the grounds of Howe Military School in Howe, Indiana. The wives of the first three bishops are also buried there. Note: The fifth bishop, William C. R. Sheridan, who died September 24, 2005, at his home in Culver, Indiana, was buried in New Oakhill Cemetery, Plymouth, Indiana.

== See also ==
- Succession of Bishops of the Episcopal Church in the United States

== Bibliography ==
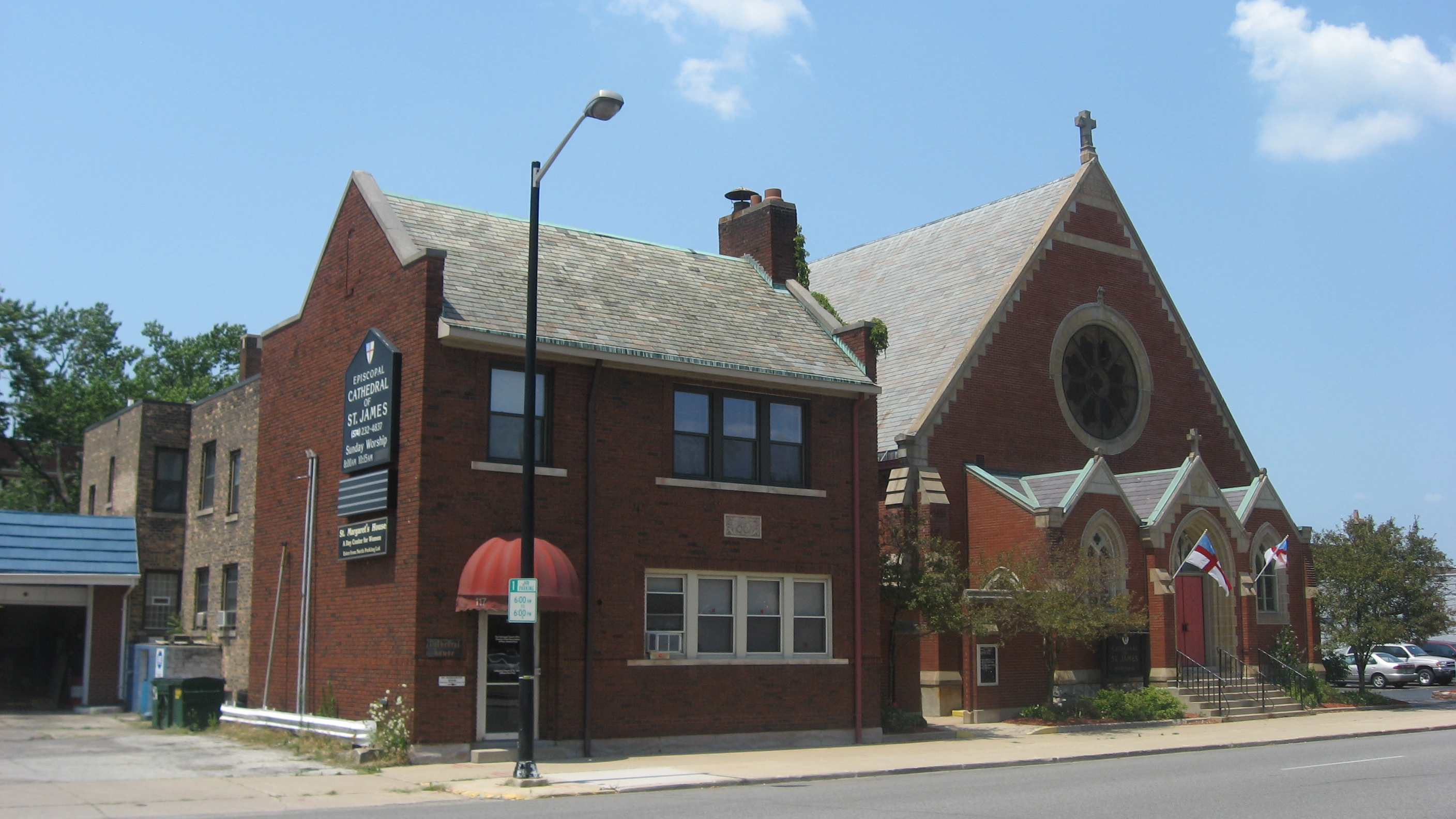
St. James Cathedral in South Bend

- Lilly, Eli, History of the Little Church on the Circle: Christ Church Parish, Indianapolis, 1837-1953 (Indianapolis: Christ Episcopal Church, 1957)
- Center, Robert J. Our Heritage: A History of the First Seventy-five Years of the Diocese of Northern Indiana (South Bend: Petersen Printing, 1973).
- Beatty, John D. The Citadel: The History of the Episcopal Diocese of Northern Indiana, 1898–2026 (South Bend: Episcopal Diocese of Northern Indiana and Lulu, 2026.
