= William C. R. Sheridan =

American bishop

The Right Reverend William C. R. Sheridan D.C.L., D.D.
- Bishop of Northern Indiana
- Church: Episcopal Church
- Diocese: Northern Indiana
- Elected: April 15, 1972
- In office: 1972–1987
- Retired: -->
- Predecessor: Walter C. Klein
- Successor: Francis Campbell Gray

Orders
- Ordination: June 28, 1943 by Noble C. Powell
- Consecration: June 24, 1972 by John E. Hines

Personal details
- Born: March 25, 1917 New York City, New York, United States
- Died: September 24, 2005 (aged 88) Culver, Indiana, United States
- Buried: New Oakhill Cemetery, Plymouth, Indiana
- Parents: John Russell Fortesque Sheridan & Gertrude Magdalene Herley
- Spouse: Rudith Treder (m. 1943)
- Children: 5

William Cockburn Russell Sheridan (March 25, 1917 – September 24, 2005) was the fifth bishop of the Episcopal Diocese of Northern Indiana and served from 1972 to 1987. He was born in New York, New York on March 25, 1917, the son of John Russell Sheridan and Gertrude Magdalen Herley Sheridan. He died September 24, 2005, at his home in Culver, Indiana and was buried in New Oakhill Cemetery, Plymouth, Indiana.

== Early life and education ==
Sheridan grew up in Baltimore where he attended St. Paul's School in Brooklandville, Maryland. He attended one year of college at the University of Virginia but due to lack of funds during the Great Depression had to drop out. He was accepted at Nashotah House Seminary in Wisconsin and attended Carroll College for his undergraduate work. He received a BA from Carroll in 1939. Bishop Sheridan would later obtain a M.Div from Nashotah House in the 1960s.

== Ordination and Parish Ministry ==
William Sheridan was ordained to the diaconate on January 1, 1940, and to the priesthood on June 28, 1943, both in the Episcopal Diocese of Maryland. He assisted at St. Thomas Episcopal Church in Towson, Maryland from 1942 to 1943. From 1943 to 1944 he assisted at St. Paul's, Hyde Park, Chicago. From 1944 to 1947, he was priest in charge of Episcopal churches in Gas City and Hartford City, Indiana while serving as rector of Gethsemane Episcopal Church in Marion, Indiana.

In 1947 Father Sheridan became rector of St Thomas' in Plymouth, Indiana and served there until he was elected bishop in 1972.

In 1959, Bishop Sheridan was presented with Plymouth Indiana's Distinguished Citizen Award for his ecumenical outreach, support for local civic developments, indigent assistance through the Ministerial Association, establishment of an Alcoholics Anonymous chapter (while in Marion, Indiana he established the first AA chapter in Indiana); he received the same award again when he retired and returned to Marshall County. He was also awarded Indiana's highest distinction - the Sagamore of the Wabash - by the then governor of Indiana, Otis Bowen.

== Episcopal ministry ==
William Sheridan was consecrated as bishop on June 24, 1972, in the Basilica of the Sacred Heart on the campus of the University of Notre Dame at the special invitation of Notre Dame's former president, Fr. Theodore M. Hesburgh. The consecration service was broadcast by WNDU Television of South Bend. Bishop Sheridan was the first non-Roman Catholic to be so honored.

Bishop Sheridan was the author of "For High School Boys Only", "Journey to Priesthood" and "Between Catholics". He remained devoted to his alma mater Nashotah House, both serving on the board of trustees and raising over $200,000 for a refectory and library addition. He was conferred the degree of Doctor of Canon Law by the seminary.

== Wife and Family ==
William Sheridan met Rudith Treder, his future wife, when they were both attending Carroll College; they married in Milwaukee, Wisconsin on November 13, 1943. Bishop and Mrs. Sheridan raised three daughters and twin sons while living in Plymouth, Indiana. Mrs. Sheridan taught High School English and Literature.

After his retirement, Bishop and Mrs. Sheridan moved to Culver, Indiana residing in a former rural church where they both lived out their lives. They were survived by all five children, nine grandchildren and eleven great-grandchildren.

== See also ==
- List of recipients of the Sagamore of the Wabash Award
- Succession of Bishops of the Episcopal Church in the United States

Episcopal Church (USA) titles
Preceded by Walter Conrad Klein	5th Bishop of Northern Indiana; 1972–1987	Succeeded by Francis Campbell Gray
