= Douglas Sparks =

American Episcopal bishop (born 1956)

The Right Reverend Douglas Sparks
- Bishop of Northern Indiana
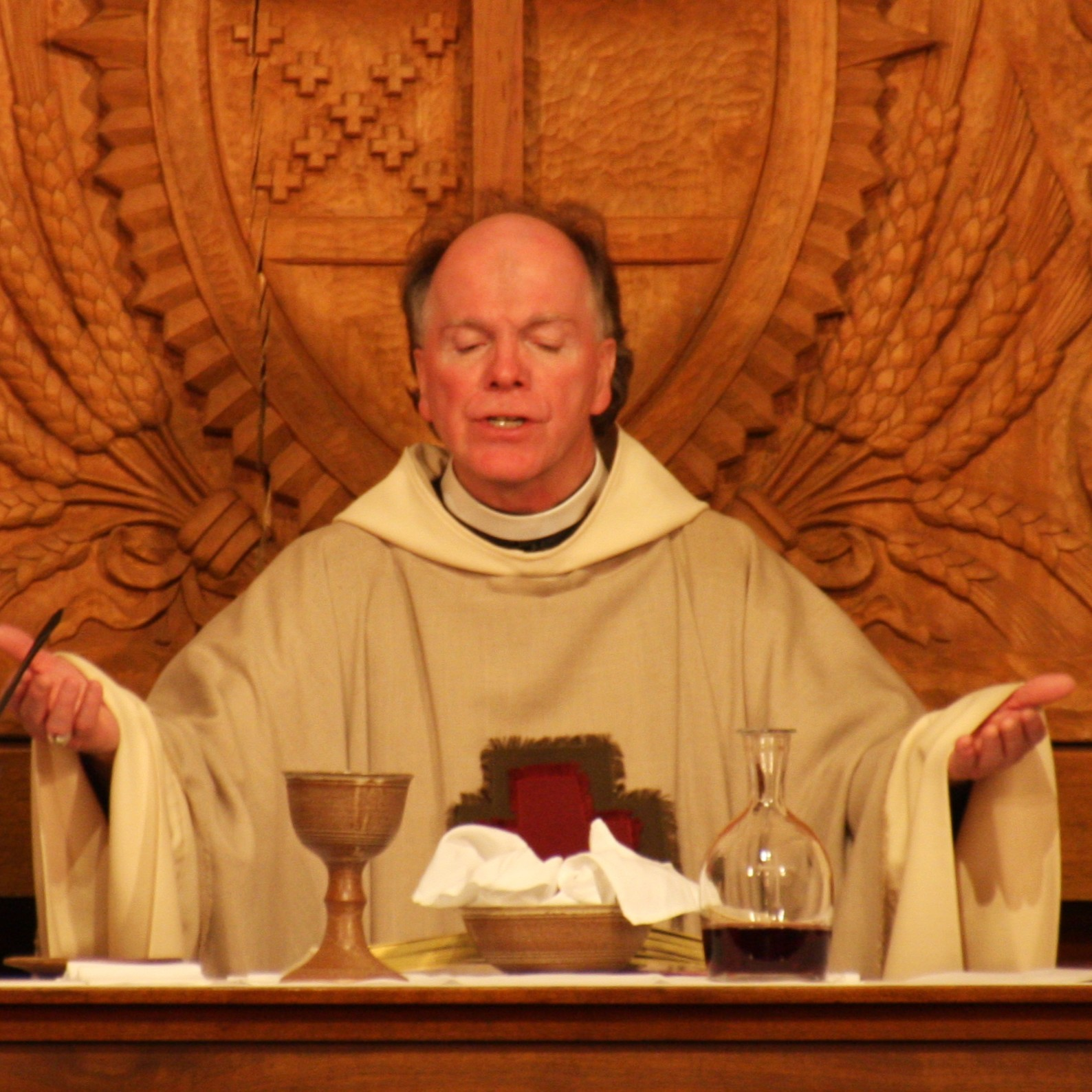
- Bishop Sparks celebrating Holy Eucharist on Ash Wednesday 2016
- Church: Episcopal Church
- Diocese: Northern Indiana
- Elected: February 6, 2016
- In office: 2016–present
- Predecessor: Edward S. Little II
- Previous posts: St. Luke's Episcopal Church, Rochester, Minnesota

Orders
- Ordination: April 9, 1983 (Roman Catholic deacon); June 2, 1984 (Roman Catholic priest) by Jesus Dosado
- Consecration: June 25, 2016 (Episcopalian) by Michael Bruce Curry

Personal details
- Born: January 8, 1956 (age 70) St. Louis, Missouri, United States
- Denomination: Anglican (prev. Roman Catholic)
- Residence: South Bend, Indiana, U.S.
- Spouse: Dana Wirth Sparks (m. 1988)
- Children: 3
- Education: St. Mary's Seminary College

Douglas Everett Sparks (born January 8, 1956) is an American Episcopal bishop. He is the eighth and current bishop of Northern Indiana in The Episcopal Church. He will retire in August 2027.

== Ordained ministry ==
=== Roman Catholic Church ===
Sparks studied Philosophy at St. Mary's Seminary College, graduating with a Bachelor of Arts (BA) degree in May 1980. He attended the De Andreis Institute of Theology in Lemont, Illinois, from which he graduated with a Master of Divinity (M.Div.) degree in June 1984.

Sparks was ordained in the Roman Catholic Church as a deacon in April 1983 and to the priesthood in June 1984. He then served as a priest in Missouri, Colorado, and Illinois.

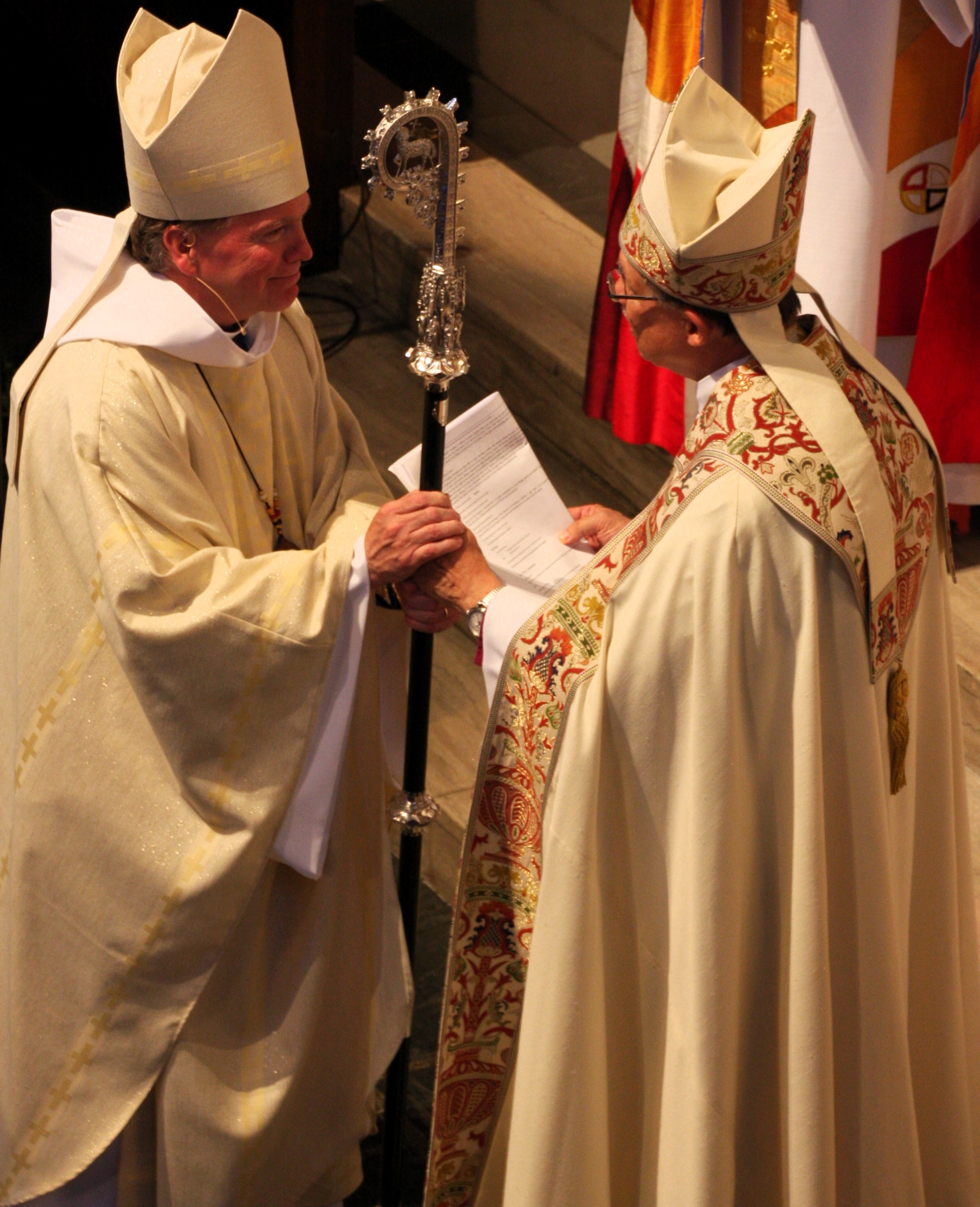
Sparks (left) receiving the crozier from his predecessor

=== Episcopal Church ===
On June 4, 1989, Sparks was received as a priest into the Episcopal Church. Sparks served as Rector of St. Luke's Episcopal Church in Whitewater, Wisconsin from 1990 to 1995.

After a further incumbency at St Matthias in Waukesha, Wisconsin, he spent eighteen months serving as Dean of Saint Paul's Cathedral, Wellington, New Zealand. Upon his return he became Rector of St. Luke's Episcopal Church in Rochester, Minnesota.

On February 6, 2016, Sparks was elected as the next bishop of the Episcopal Diocese of Northern Indiana. On June 25, 2016, the Nativity of Saint John the Baptist, he was consecrated a bishop by Michael Curry.

== Personal life ==
Sparks is married to Dana Wirth Sparks; the couple has three children Christina, Graham, and Gavin.

== See also ==
- List of Episcopal bishops of the United States
- Historical list of the Episcopal bishops of the United States

Anglican Communion titles
Preceded by Michael Henry Brown	Dean of Wellington; 2003–2004	Succeeded by Frank Nelson
