= St. Gregory's Abbey, Three Rivers =

Benedectine monastery near Three Rivers, Michigan

Coordinates: 41°58′32.2″N 85°42′48.0″W

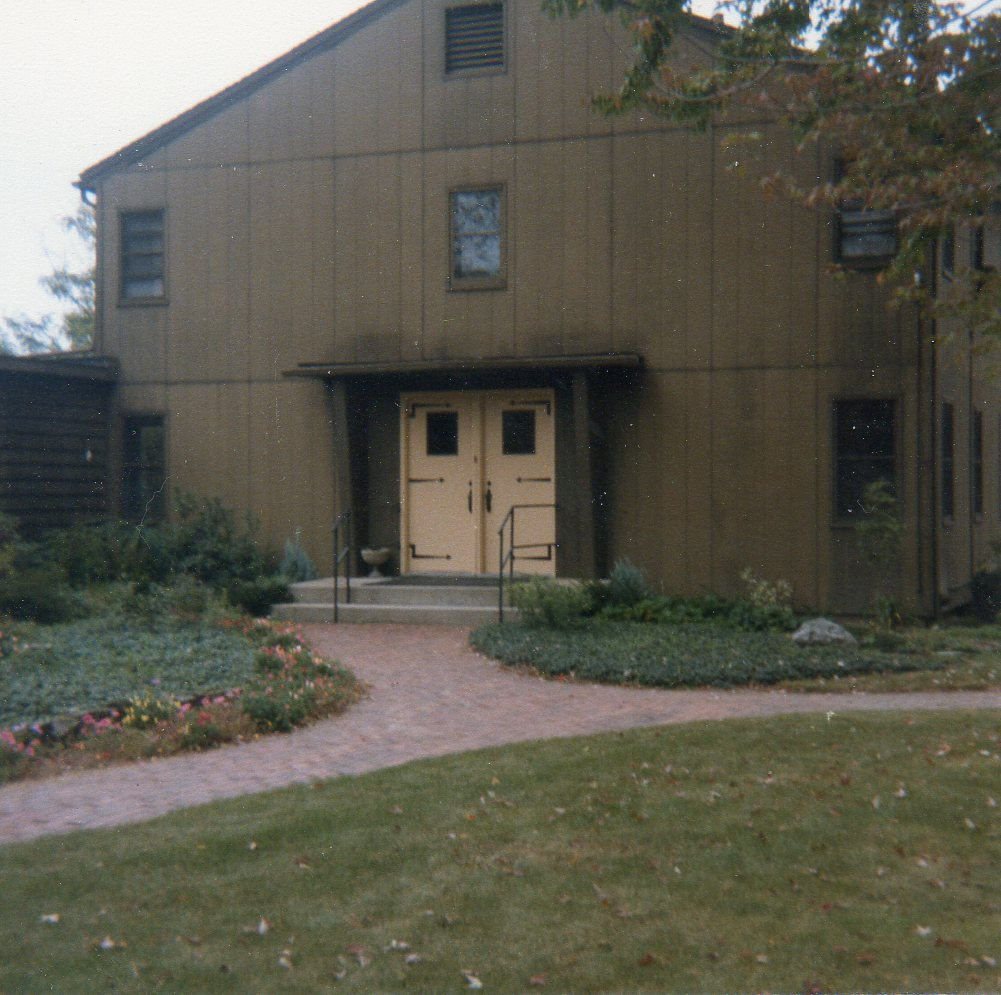
Abbey church, prior to renovation.

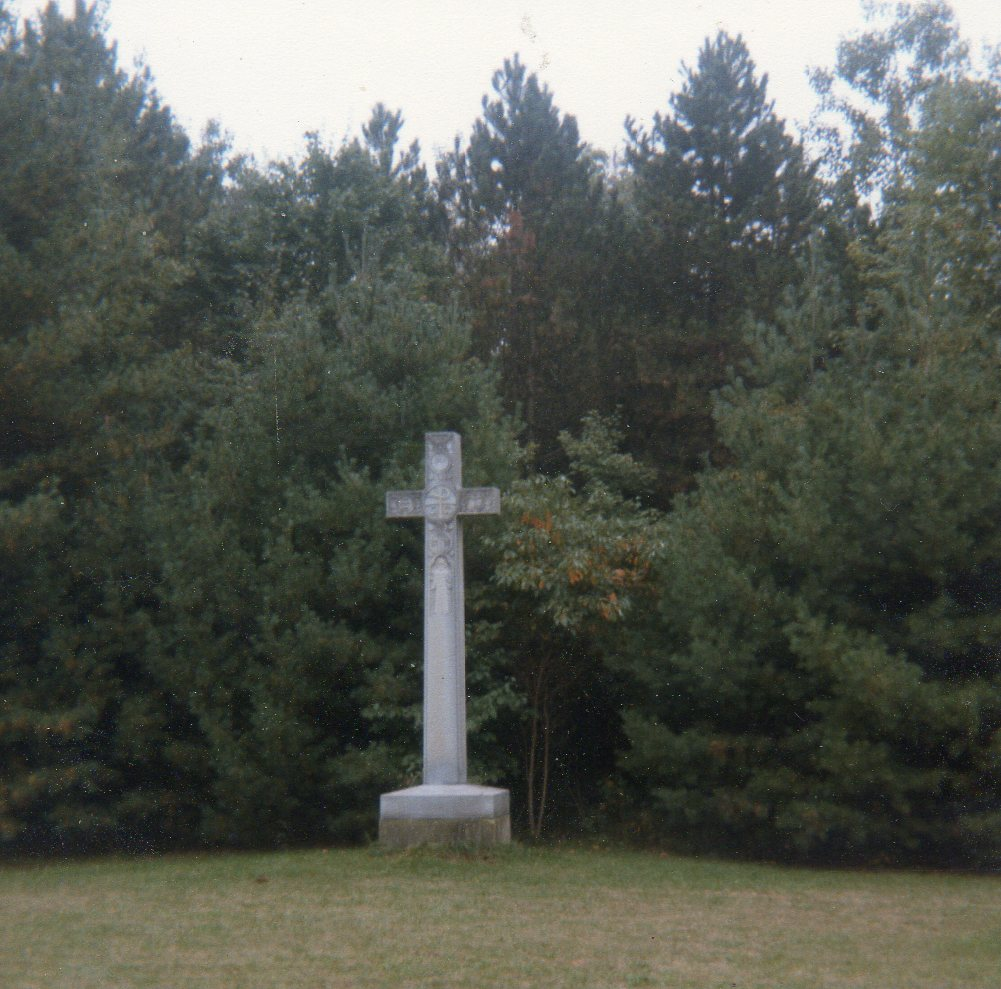
Marble cross in the abbey's cemetery

St. Gregory's Abbey is an American monastic community of men living under the Rule of St. Benedict within the Episcopal Church. The abbey is located near Three Rivers in St. Joseph County, Michigan.

== History ==
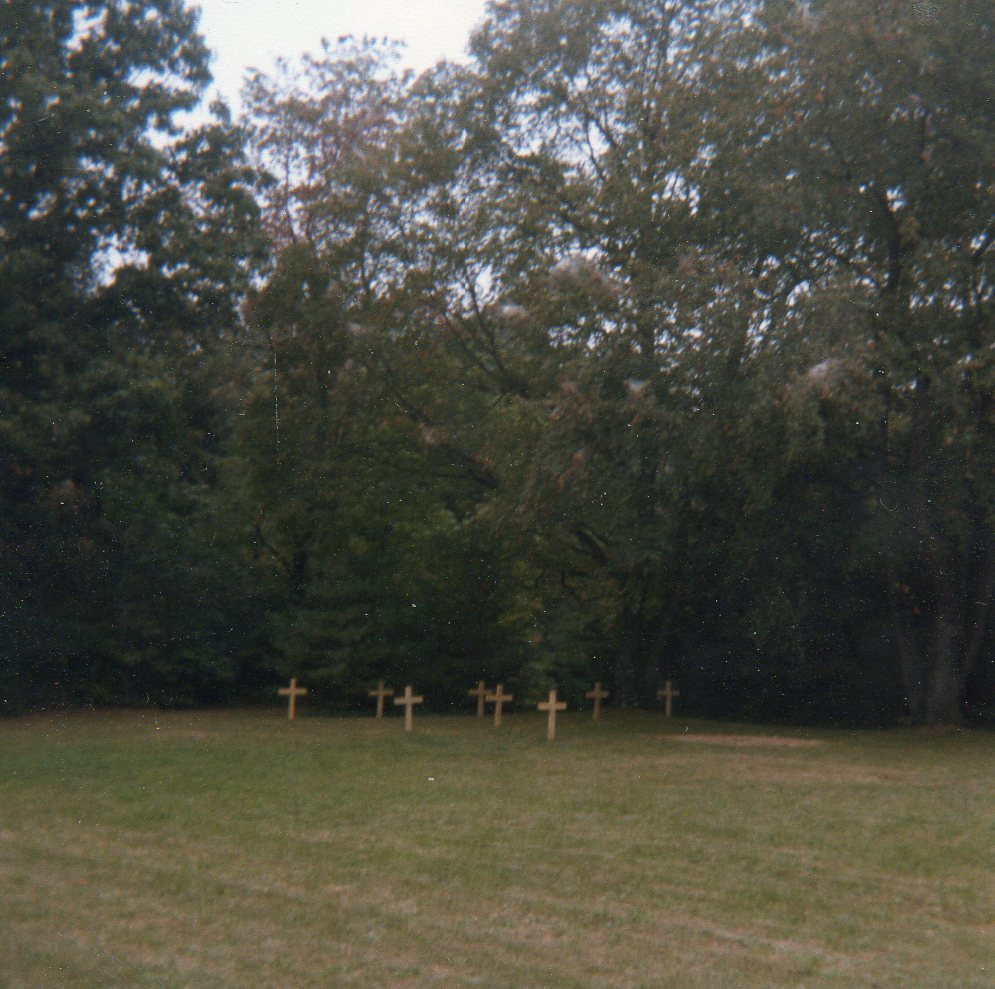
Grave markers in the abbey's cemetery

In 1935, Rolland F. Severance and the Rev. Trevor Bacon joined a group of American Episcopalians who went to England to be trained by the Anglican Benedictines of Nashdom Abbey in Buckinghamshire. Severance was a professor of apologetics at Nashotah House, an Episcopal seminary. Canon Vivian A. Peterson, rector of St. James Anglican Catholic Church in Cleveland, Ohio, raised funds to sponsor their studies.

Severance and Bacon returned to the US, and became life-professed monks; Severance taking the name Dom Paul, and Bacon taking Dom Francis. In 1939 they formed St. Gregory's House in Valparaiso, Indiana.

The monks initially gained their living by taking charge of three mission churches in Episcopal Diocese of Northern Indiana under Bishop Campbell Gray. The three missions were: St. Stephen's in Hobart, St. Andrew's in Valparaiso and St. Augustine's Episcopal Church (Gary, Indiana). The monks published a newsletter titled "Benedicite".

In 1946, the Abbot of Nashdom House advised them that as the community was relatively new, the monks needed to leave parish ministry to focus more on the monastic life. They moved to a farm near Three Rivers, Michigan; and the community grew considerably under the leadership of Dom Paul Severance. the cornerstone of the first priory building, the chapel, was laid on 20 October 1950.

For 30 years, the monastery was a dependency of Nashdom Abbey and relied on the careful shepherding of its abbots. In 1969 St. Gregory's became an independent abbey, and the community's prior, Benedict Reid, was elected first abbot. In 1989, Andrew Marr was elected as his successor.

== Monastic life ==
The center of the monastery’s life is the Abbey Church. The monks gather seven times a day in the church for the liturgy of the hours and Eucharist. Work, study and prayer are the main activities, with prayer being the most important. The conventual Eucharist is the center of each day. In the past, the monastery celebrated the Tridentine Mass in Latin, but Mass is now celebrated from the 1979 Book of Common Prayer and with the celebrant facing the congregation.

The monastery housework is done by the monks. This includes a good deal of outside work such as landscaping, gardening, and grounds maintenance.

There are classes for the monks, correspondence to answer, sermons, retreats, and special ministries to prepare for. Community members occasionally minister in parish churches and other religious houses, and retreats conducted at the abbey. The abbey has two guesthouses, and a cottage for guest stays of two days to one week. The frequency of external activities incidental to the normal life of a monk is regulated by the necessity of preserving Benedictine life.
