= Edward S. Little II =

The Right Reverend Edward Stuart Little II D.D.
- Bishop of Northern Indiana
- Church: Episcopal Church
- Diocese: Northern Indiana
- Elected: November 5, 1999
- In office: 2000–2016
- Predecessor: Francis Campbell Gray
- Successor: Douglas Sparks

Orders
- Ordination: December 18, 1971 by James W. Montgomery
- Consecration: April 30, 2000 by Arthur Benjamin Williams Jr.

Personal details
- Born: January 29, 1947 (age 79) New York City, New York, United States
- Denomination: Anglican
- Spouse: Sylvia Gardner (m. 1968)
- Children: 2
- Education: University of North Carolina

Edward Stuart Little II (born January 29, 1947) was elected seventh Bishop of the Episcopal Diocese of Northern Indiana on November 5, 1999, and consecrated on March 18, 2000, in the Basilica of the Sacred Heart on the campus of the University of Notre Dame. He was seated in the Cathedral of St. James, South Bend, on April 30, 2000. He retired on June 30, 2016.

== Ministry ==
Bishop Edward S. Little II was born in New York City on January 29, 1947, and attended schools in Manhattan and in Norwalk, Connecticut. He received his bachelor's degree from the University of Southern California in 1968, his Master of Divinity from Seabury-Western Theological Seminary in 1971, and was ordained deacon and priest that year in the Diocese of Chicago. Following his consecration, Bishop Little was awarded an honorary Doctor of Divinity degree by Seabury-Western.

Bishop Little served two parishes as an assistant—St. Matthew's, Evanston, Illinois, and St. Michael's, Anaheim, California—and then moved in 1975 to St. Joseph's Church, Buena Park, California, to become its vicar and later its first rector. In 1986, Bishop Little was called to All Saints Church, Bakersfield, California, where he served as rector until his election to the episcopate. He has authored two books; Ears to Hear and Joy in Disguise.

He is currently a member of Communion Partners, an Episcopalian group which opposed the 77th General Episcopal Convention's decision to authorize the blessing of same-sex marriages in 2012. The measure to allow the blessing of same-sex unions won by a 111–41 vote with 3 abstentions.

== Family life ==
Bishop Little married the former Sylvia Gardner on March 22, 1968, in Palm Desert, California. They met at the University of Southern California in 1964.

== Sources ==
- Episcopal Clerical Directory, 2005, revised edition, New York: Church Publishing, p. 547.
- Little, Edward S. (2003). Ears to Hear. ISBN 9780819219398
- Little, Edward S. (2009). Joy In Disguise . ISBN 9780819223289

Episcopal Church (USA) titles
Preceded by Francis Campbell Gray	Seventh Bishop of Northern Indiana; 2000 – 2016	Succeeded by Douglas Sparks
