= Campbell Gray =

American bishop

The Right Reverend Campbell Gray
- Bishop of Northern Indiana
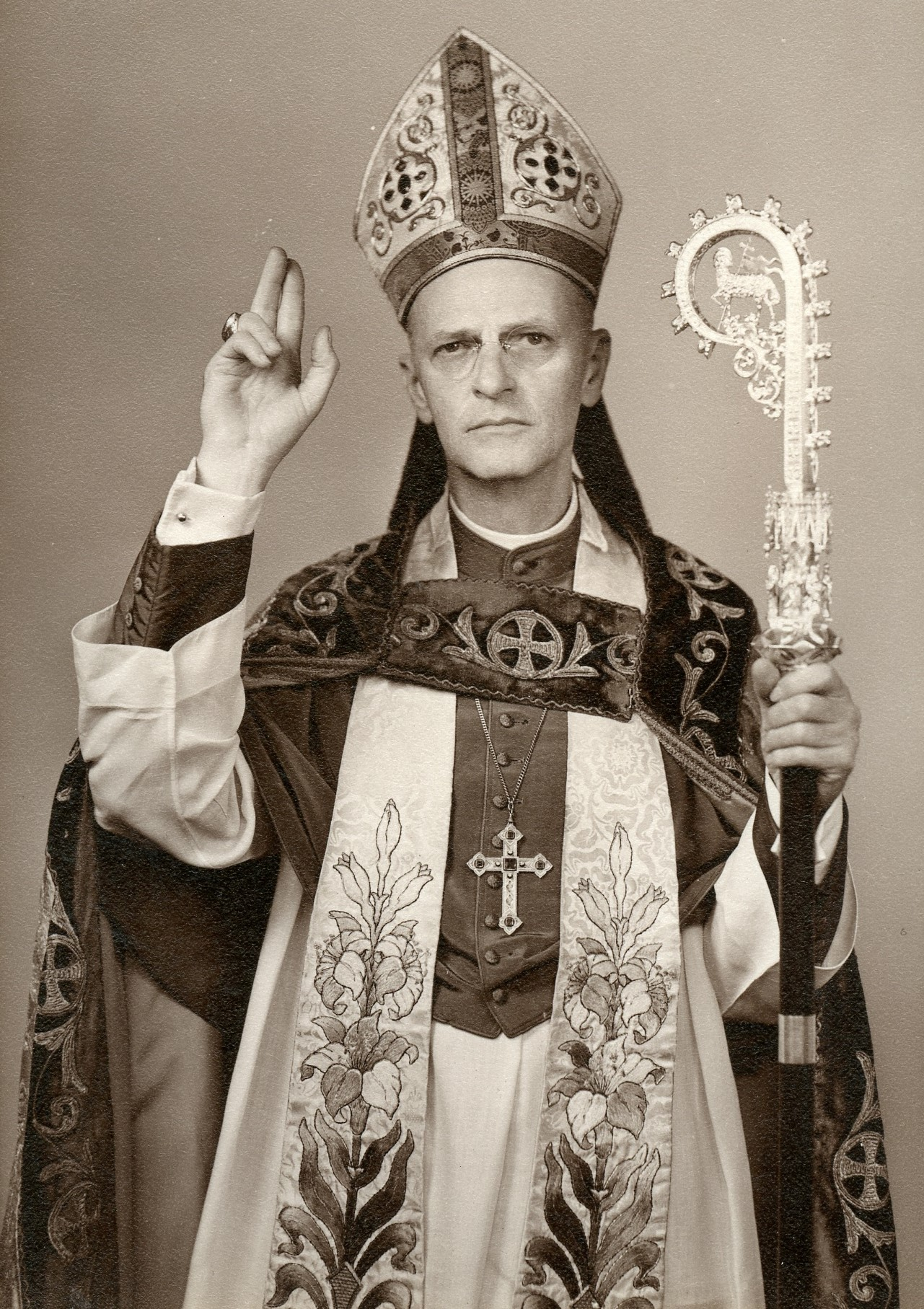
- Church: Episcopal Church
- Diocese: Northern Indiana
- Elected: January 21, 1925
- In office: 1925–1944
- Predecessor: John Hazen White
- Successor: Reginald Mallett

Orders
- Ordination: January 6, 1905 by William Crane Gray
- Consecration: May 1, 1925 by Reginald Heber Weller

Personal details
- Born: January 7, 1879 Bolivar, Tennessee, United States
- Died: May 16, 1944 (aged 65) Mishawaka, Indiana, United States
- Buried: St. James Memorial Chapel, Howe, Indiana
- Denomination: Anglican
- Parents: William Crane Gray, Fannie Campbell Bowers
- Spouse: Virginia Neil Morgan (m. 1905)
- Children: 5
- Education: University of the South

Campbell Gray (January 6, 1879 – May 16, 1944) was an American bishop of the Episcopal Church. He was the second Bishop of Northern Indiana.

== Early life and education ==
Gray was born on January 6, 1879, in Bolivar, Tennessee, the son of an Episcopal priest and later bishop, William Crane Gray, and his second wife, Fannie Campbell (Bowers) Gray. He attended the University of the South in Sewanee, Tennessee, and received a B.A. in 1901 and an M.A. in 1902. He started his theological studies at Sewanee but transferred after one year to the General Theological Seminary in New York City where he graduated in 1904.

== Ministry ==
Gray was ordained to the diaconate in 1904 and to the priesthood in 1905. He worked as a missionary in Southern Florida from 1904 to 1914 when he became vicar of St. Augustine's Episcopal Church in Rhinelander, Wisconsin. He stayed there until 1922 when he left to become rector of St. Paul's Episcopal Church in Peoria, Illinois. In 1925 he was elected bishop coadjutor of the Episcopal Diocese of Northern Indiana, but John Hazen White died before he could be consecrated. Gray was immediately consecrated to the episcopate immediately as the diocesan bishop.

== Family ==
Gray married Virginia Neil Morgan (born September 18, 1886) on November 1, 1905. They had five children, one son, Francis Campbell Gray, became an Episcopal priest and the sixth Bishop of Northern Indiana. Gray's wife died in February 1978 while residing in Davenport, Florida.

== Honorary doctorates ==
In 1925, Gray was awarded an honorary Doctor of Divinity (D.D.) degree by Nashotah House and, in 1926, honorary doctorates from Sewanee (D.D.) and the General Theological Seminary (S.T.D.).

== Death and burial ==
Gray died on May 16, 1944, when residing in Mishawaka, Indiana. He was buried next to his wife in the crypt of St. James Memorial Chapel on the grounds of Howe Military School in Howe, Indiana.

== See also ==
- Historical list of bishops of the Episcopal Church in the United States of America

== Resources ==
- Who Was Who in America, vol. 2 (1943–1950), Chicago: A.N Marquis Company, 1963, p. 219

Episcopal Church (USA) titles
Preceded by John Hazen White	2nd Bishop of Northern Indiana; 1925 – 1944	Succeeded by Reginald Mallett
