= Springfield Township, LaGrange County, Indiana =

Township in Indiana, United States

Springfield Township
- Township
- Coordinates: 41°39′36″N 85°15′34″W
- Country: United States
- State: Indiana
- County: LaGrange

Government
  - Type: Indiana township

Area
  - Total: 35.9 sq mi (93 km^{2})
  - Land: 35.59 sq mi (92.2 km^{2})
  - Water: 0.31 sq mi (0.80 km^{2})
- Elevation: 920 ft (280 m)

Population (2020)
  - Total: 1,158
  - Density: 33.1/sq mi (12.8/km^{2})
- FIPS code: 18-72152
- GNIS feature ID: 453866

Historical population
| Census | Pop. | Note | %± |
|---|---|---|---|
| 1960 | 880 | | — |
| 1970 | 851 | | −3.3% |
| 1980 | 1,094 | | 28.6% |
| 1990 | 1,188 | | 8.6% |
| 2000 | 1,284 | | 8.1% |
| 2010 | 1,179 | | −8.2% |
| 2020 | 1,158 | | −1.8% |
U.S. Census:

Springfield Township is one of eleven townships in LaGrange County, Indiana. As of the 2020 census, its population was 1,158 (down from 1,179 at 2010) and it contained 453 housing units.

== History ==
Springfield Township was founded in 1834.

The John O'Ferrell Store at Mongo was listed on the National Register of Historic Places in 1975.

== Geography ==
According to the 2010 census, the township has a total area of 35.9 square miles (93 km^{2}), of which 35.59 square miles (92.2 km^{2}) (or 99.14%) is land and 0.31 square miles (0.80 km^{2}) (or 0.86%) is water.
