= Lima Township School =

- Formerly listed on the U.S. National Register of Historic Places
- Location: Market and Broad Sts., Howe, Indiana
- Area: less than one acre
- Built: 1874-1875
- Architectural style: Gothic
- NRHP reference No.: 85003193

Significant dates
- Added to NRHP: December 19, 1985
- Removed from NRHP: June 18, 1986

Lima Township School, also known as Lima School, was a historic school building located at Howe, Indiana. It was built in 1874–1875, and was a 2 1/2-story, Gothic Revival style brick building on a raised basement. It had a hipped roof with gable dormers. Additions were made in 1911, 1927, and 1961. It has been demolished.

It was listed in the National Register of Historic Places in 1985 and delisted in 1986.
