= Star Milling and Electric Company Historic District =

Historic district in Indiana, United States

- U.S. National Register of Historic Places
- U.S. Historic district
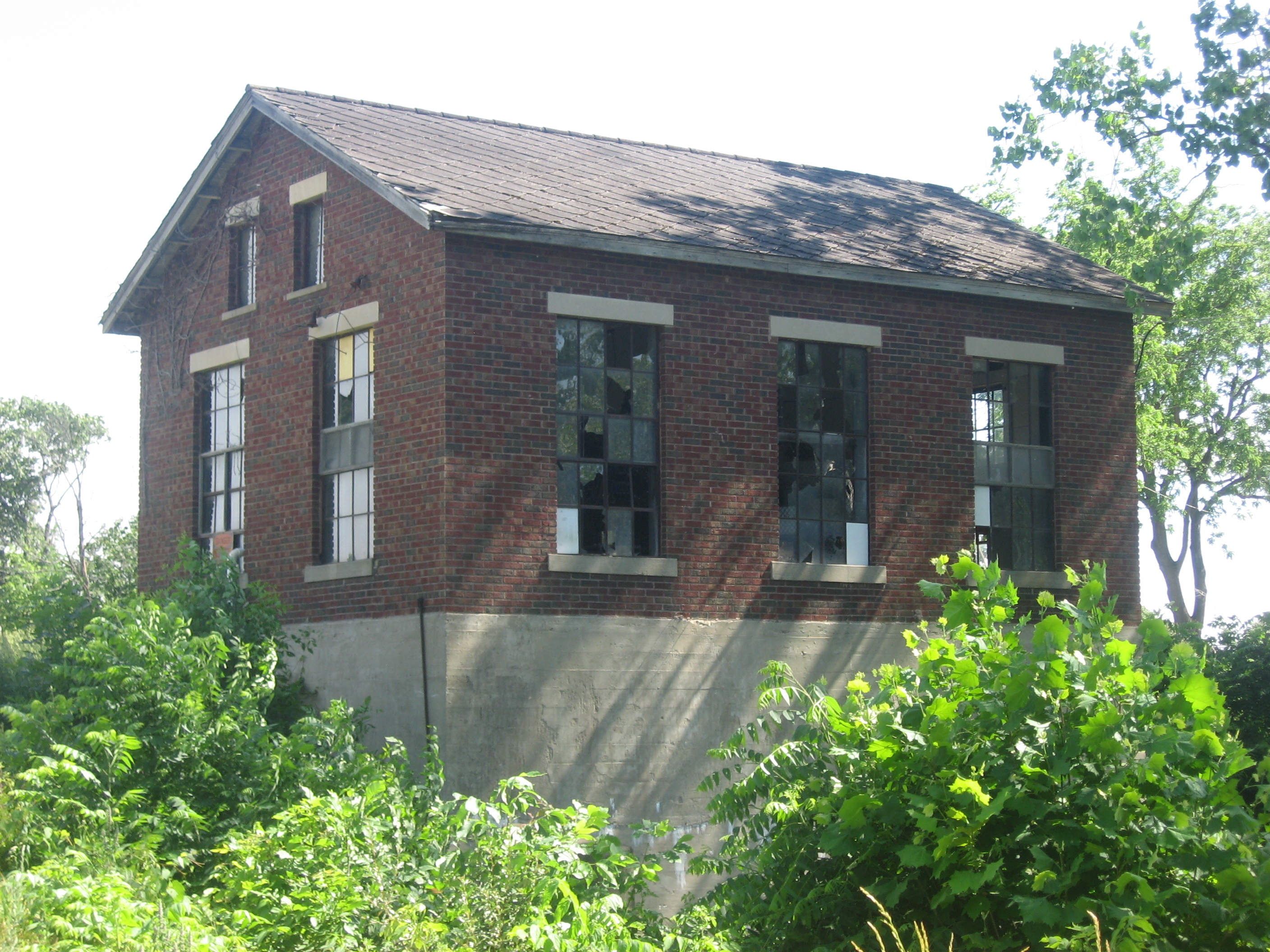
- Star Mill Power Plant, May 2012

- Location within Indiana Location within the United States
- Location: Junction of County Roads 505 W and 700 N, northeast of Howe in Lima Township, LaGrange County, Indiana
- Coordinates: 41°44′54″N 85°26′14″W
- Area: 4 acres (1.6 ha)
- Built: 1911
- Architect: McKee, Ray
- NRHP reference No.: 95001107
- Added to NRHP: September 14, 1995

Star Milling and Electric Company Historic District, also known as Star Mill Falls and Star Gristmill, is a historic industrial complex and national historic district located in Lima Township, LaGrange County, Indiana. The district encompasses one contributing building, one contributing site, and two contributing structures. They are a small hydroelectric powerhouse (1929), two dams (1929), and the site of the original 1870 grist mill / hydroelectric generating plant. The old mill generated electric power from 1911 to 1929, and in 1930 the new powerhouse began operation.

It was listed in the National Register of Historic Places in 1995.
