= Cathedral of St. James (South Bend, Indiana) =

Historic church in Indiana, United States

- Cathedral of St. James and Parish Hall
- U.S. National Register of Historic Places
- The cathedral in 2019

- Location within Indiana Location within the United States
- Location: 115 and 117 N. Lafayette Boulevard; South Bend, Indiana
- Coordinates: 41°40′37″N 86°15′14″W
- Area: less than one acre
- Built: 1894
- Architect: Austin & Parker
- Architectural style: Gothic Revival
- MPS: Downtown South Bend Historic MRA
- NRHP reference No.: 85001205
- Added to NRHP: June 5, 1985

The Cathedral of St. James is an Episcopal cathedral in South Bend, Indiana, United States. It is the seat of the Diocese of Northern Indiana. The cathedral church and the adjoining parish hall were placed on the National Register of Historic Places in 1985.

The cathedral reported 245 members in 2017 and 189 members in 2025. Plate and pledge income for the congregation in 2025 was $354,169 with average Sunday attendance (ASA) of 109.

== History ==
The parish hall (left) and cathedral

St. James parish was established in 1868 and was the first Episcopal congregation in the city. The present church building was designed by the architectural firm of Austin & Parker in the Gothic Revival style. It was completed in 1894. The parish hall was completed in 1920.

Initially, the parish was part of the Diocese of Indiana and became a part of the Diocese of Michigan City when Indiana was split by the 1898 General Convention. Trinity Church in Michigan City was chosen as the diocesan cathedral at the first diocesan convention on April 25, 1899. It served that purpose until November 4, 1917, when it ceased being a cathedral. The name of the diocese was changed to the Diocese of Northern Indiana on May 20, 1919. St. James Church became the diocesan cathedral on January 30, 1957.

== Notable people ==
Pete Buttigieg, the former mayor of South Bend, was a parishioner at St. James, and married his husband Chasten Glezman there on July 16, 2018.

== See also ==
- List of the Episcopal cathedrals of the United States
- List of cathedrals in the United States
