= John O'Ferrell Store =

- Olde Store (John O'Ferrell Store)
- U.S. National Register of Historic Places
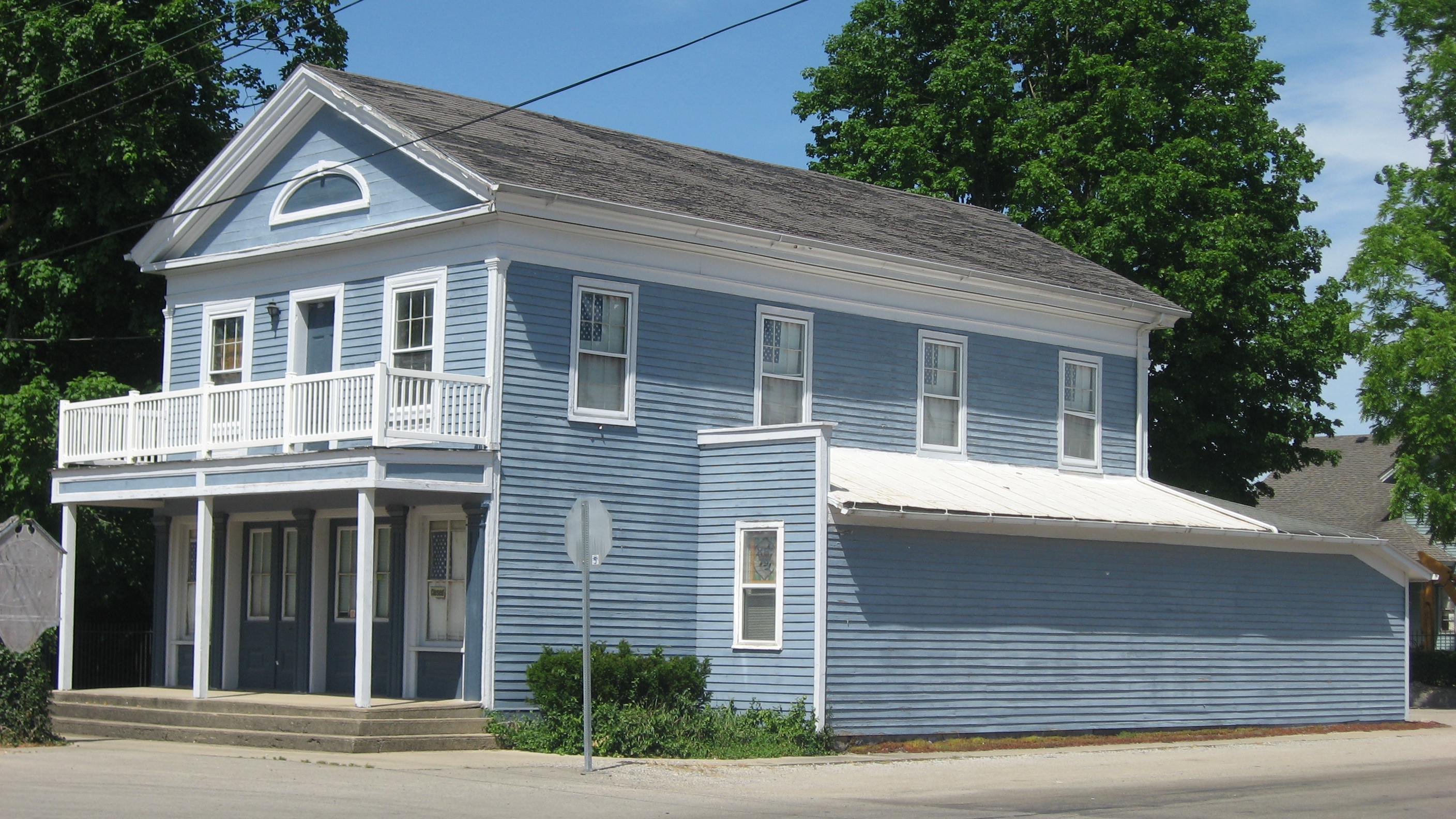
- John O'Ferrell Store, May 2012

- Location within Indiana Location within the United States
- Location: West and 2nd Sts., Mongo, Indiana
- Coordinates: 41°41′8″N 85°16′46″W
- Area: 0.1 acres (0.040 ha)
- Built: 1832
- Architectural style: Greek Revival
- NRHP reference No.: 75000024
- Added to NRHP: October 29, 1975

John O'Ferrell Store, also known as "Olde Store", is a historic general store located at Mongo, Indiana. It was built in 1832, and is a two-story, Greek Revival style frame building, with later 19th century additions. The replacement shed roofed front porch was added in the 1930s. Over its history, the store served as a post office, distillery, and informal courtroom.

It was listed in the National Register of Historic Places in 1975.
