= Howe Military Academy =

Private college preparatory school in Indiana, US

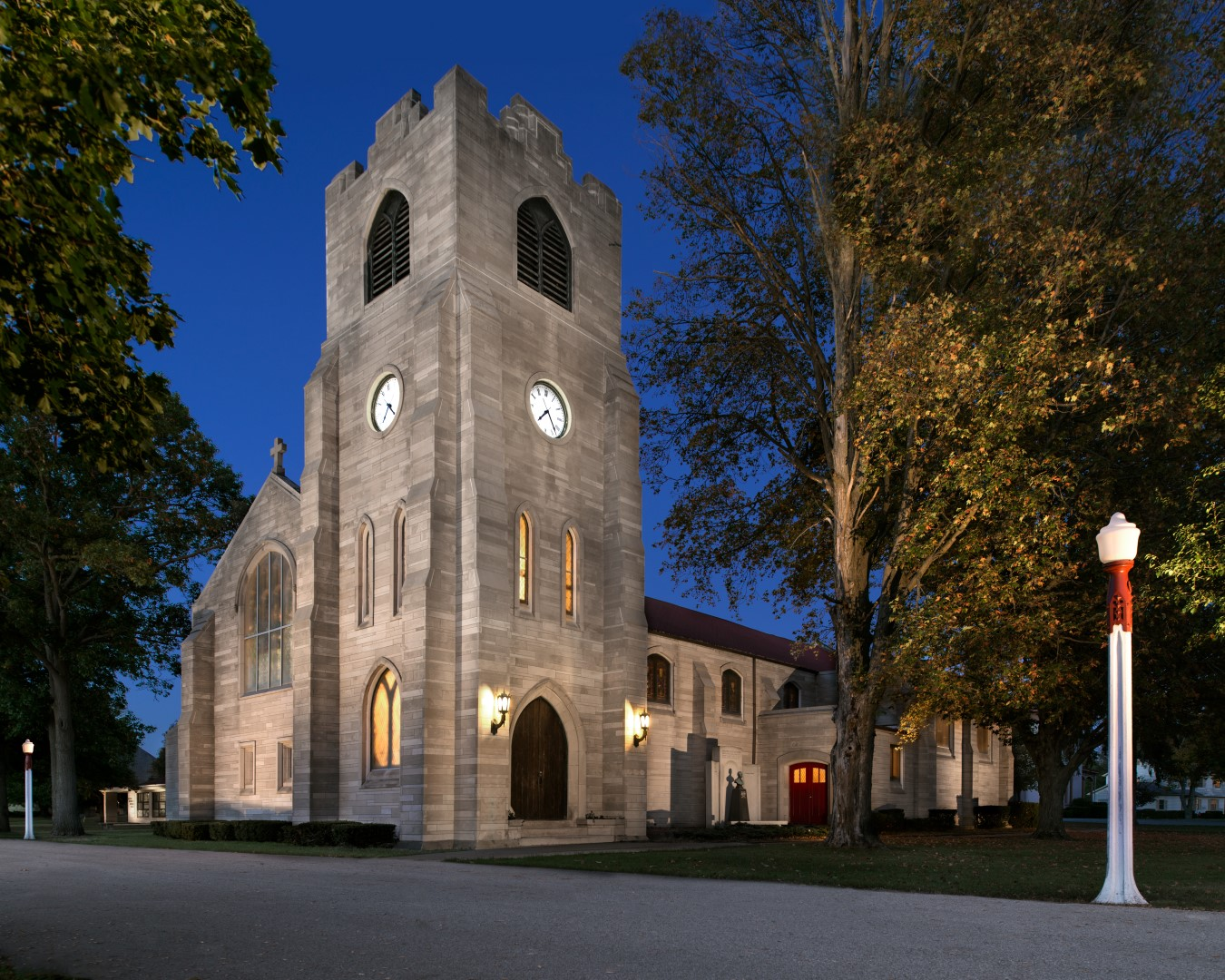
- St James Memorial Chapel at the former Howe Military Academy

Location
- Howe, Indiana; United States; 41°43′28″N 85°25′24″W

Information
- Type: Private, Boarding, JROTC
- Religious affiliation: Christian
- Established: 1884
- Status: Closed
- Closed: 2019
- President: Col Thomas Tate
- Faculty: 42
- Enrollment: 80
- Campus: 100 acres (0.40 km^{2})
- Mascot: Cadets
- Website: www.hmsalumni.net

Howe Military Academy was a private, co-educational and college preparatory boarding school located on a 100-acre (0.40 km^{2}) campus in Howe, Indiana. The school, which enrolled students for grades 5 through 12, opened in 1884, and closed after the 2018–19 academic year.

== History ==
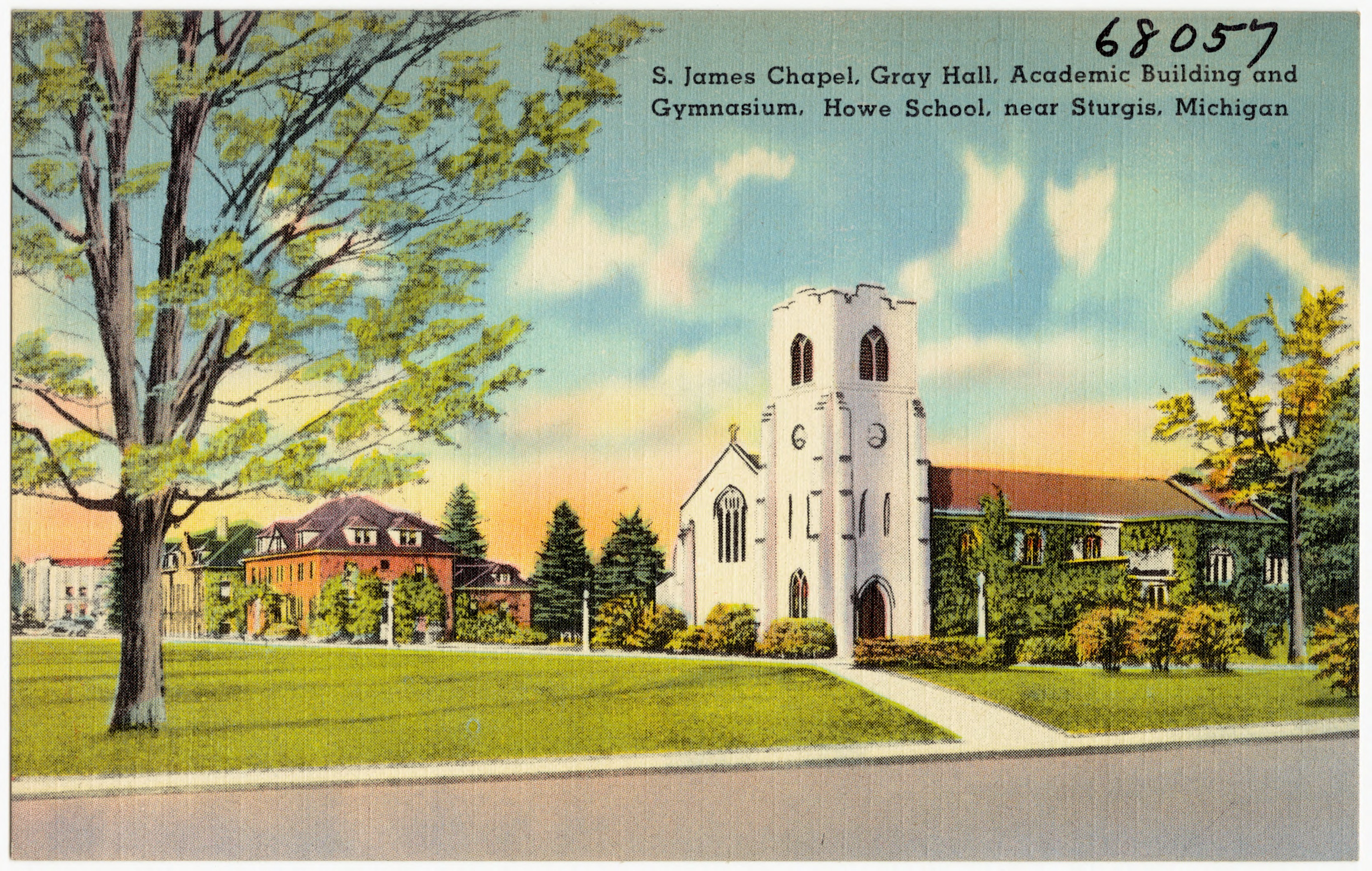
Old postcard of the school

Founded in the fall of 1884, Howe Grammar School, later renamed Howe Military Academy, was established as a preparatory school for young men who were seeking ordination to the priesthood of the Episcopal Church. The school's formation was largely the result of a bequest of John Badlam Howe, who died in 1883. His widow, Frances Marie Glidden Howe, and James Blake Howe, along with the Right Reverend David B. Knickerbacker third Episcopal bishop of Indiana, and Dr. Charles Spaulding, the first rector at Howe, took the $10,000 bequest left by John Howe and increased it to $50,000 to establish Howe Grammar School for boys. The school opened in the former home of Mr. and Mrs. Howe, built in 1844, with two boys. The school became a military school in 1895, and fully co-educational in 1988, with Company A (Alpha) being the all-female company consisting of day students and those that live on campus full-time.

As of September 2008, Howe was one of 28 military schools in the United States, down from a high of 125 such schools, and one of only two in Indiana. For many years, the Howe house has been the home of the chaplain who serves Howe Military Academy. This was the house in which John B. Howe drafted the 1851 Constitution of the State of Indiana. St. James Memorial Chapel is on the National Register of Historic Places. The Rev. Philip Morgan, a native of Wales, serving in the Episcopal Church from 1984 was the School Chaplain, and Rector of St. Mark's, Howe from 1986 to 2000

On March 18, 2019, Howe announced it would be closing its doors due to operational and fiscal challenges. At the end of the 2018–2019 school year, the school was closed and put on the market. In June 2020, the school property and its buildings were sold for US$3 million to Olivet, a New York-based religious organization.

== Sports ==
Howe Military did not compete in a conference structure. Preferring to stay independent, Howe competed regionally against parochial, private and public schools. Howe fielded men's football, tennis, soccer, basketball, wrestling, baseball, lacrosse, drill, and track. For women soccer, volleyball, and tennis were available. Also Howe had a perennially nationally ranked rifle team that was available to both men and women.

== Notable alumni ==
- John Cromwell - actor and director•
