= John Badlam Howe Mansion =

Historic house in Indiana, United States

- U.S. National Register of Historic Places
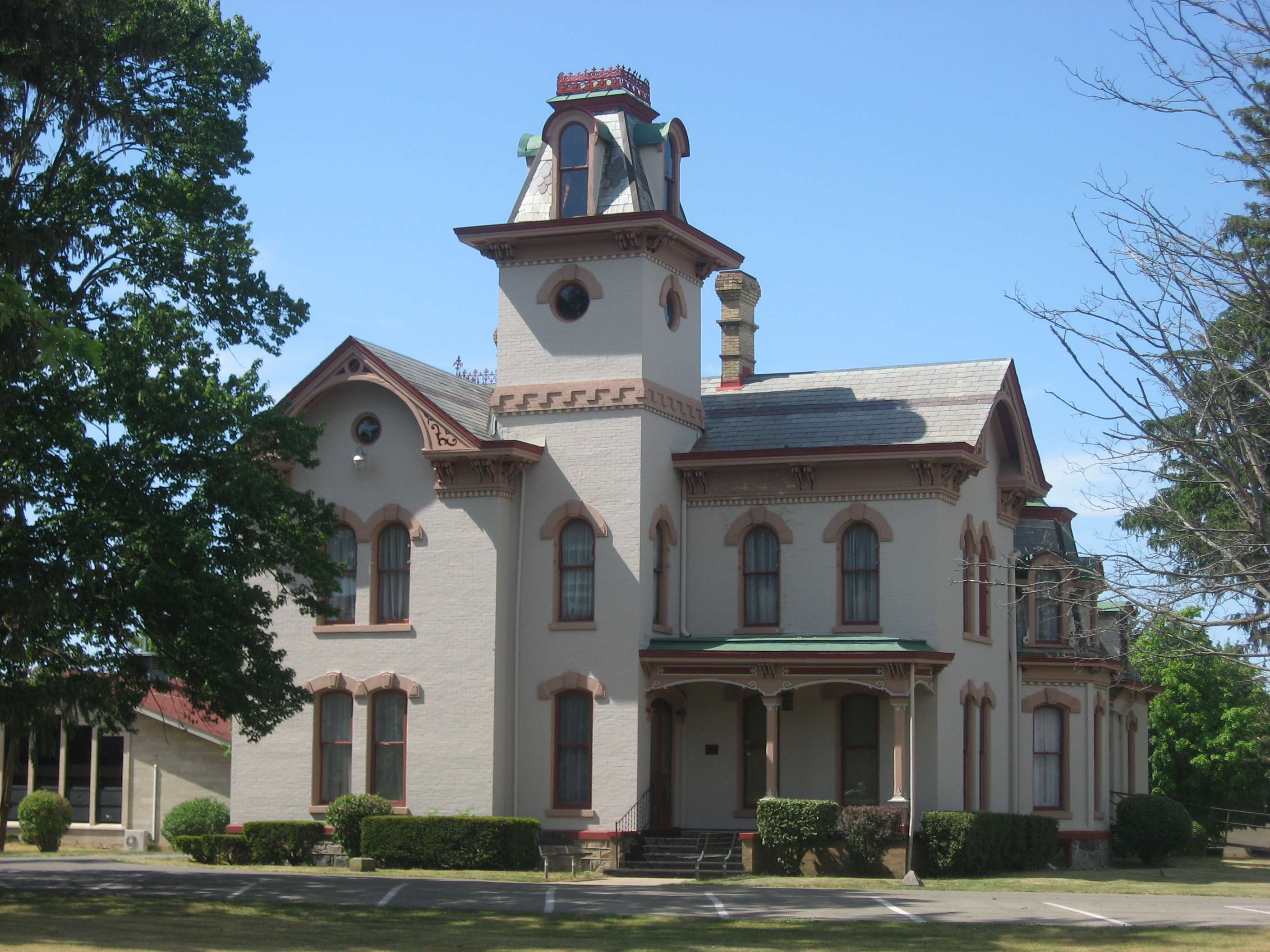
- John Badlam Howe Mansion, May 2012

- Location within Indiana Location within the United States
- Location: W. Union St. at Howe, Indiana
- Coordinates: 41°43′28″N 85°25′28″W
- Area: less than one acre
- Built: 1875-1876
- Architect: Barrows, Julius
- Architectural style: Italianate, Second Empire
- NRHP reference No.: 95001106
- Added to NRHP: September 14, 1995

John Badlam Howe Mansion is a historic home located on the grounds of Howe Military School, in Howe, Indiana. It was built in 1875–1876, and is a two-story, Italianate style white brick building trimmed with stone and terra cotta. It measures 51 feet by 78 feet, and features a three-story, central tower with a Second Empire style mansard roof.

It was listed in the National Register of Historic Places in 1995.
