= Samuel P. Williams House =

Historic house in Indiana, United States

- U.S. National Register of Historic Places
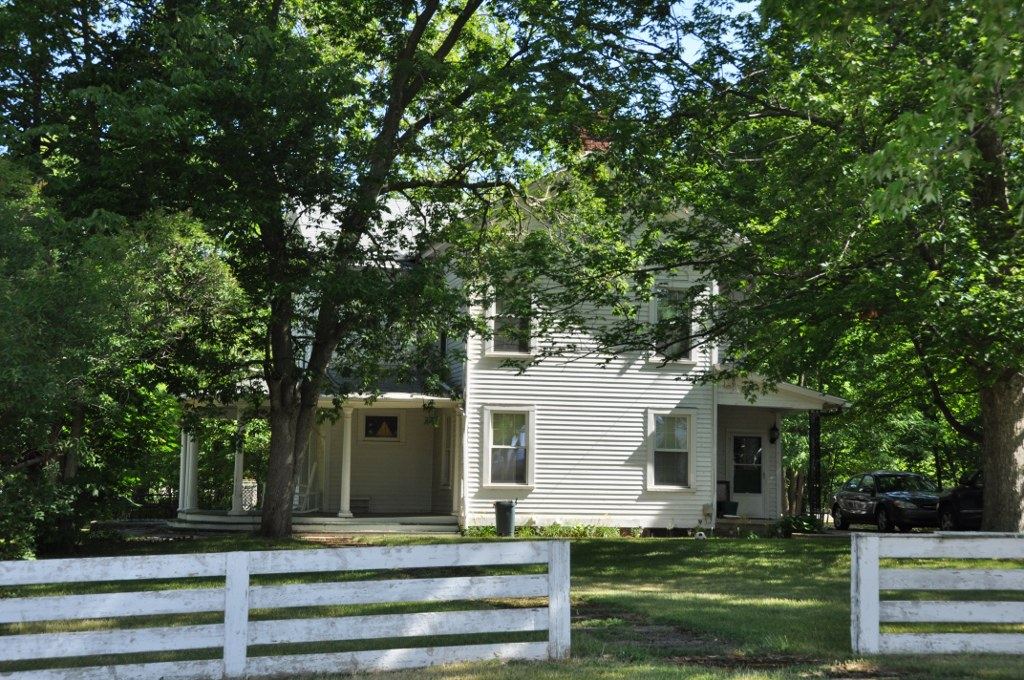
- Samuel P. Williams House, 2012

- Location within Indiana Location within the United States
- Location: 101 South St., at Howe, Indiana
- Coordinates: 41°43′19″N 85°25′7″W
- Area: 2.2 acres (0.89 ha)
- Built: 1838-1843
- Architectural style: Western Reserve
- NRHP reference No.: 80000043
- Added to NRHP: August 11, 1980

Samuel P. Williams House, also known as "Old Home", is a historic home located at Howe, Indiana. It was built between 1838 and 1843, and is a Western Reserve style frame dwelling. It consists of a 2 1/2-story central block with 1 1/2-story symmetrical wings. Also on the property is a contributing carriage barn constructed in the 1840s.

It was listed in the National Register of Historic Places in 1980.
