= Howe, Indiana =

- Census-designated place
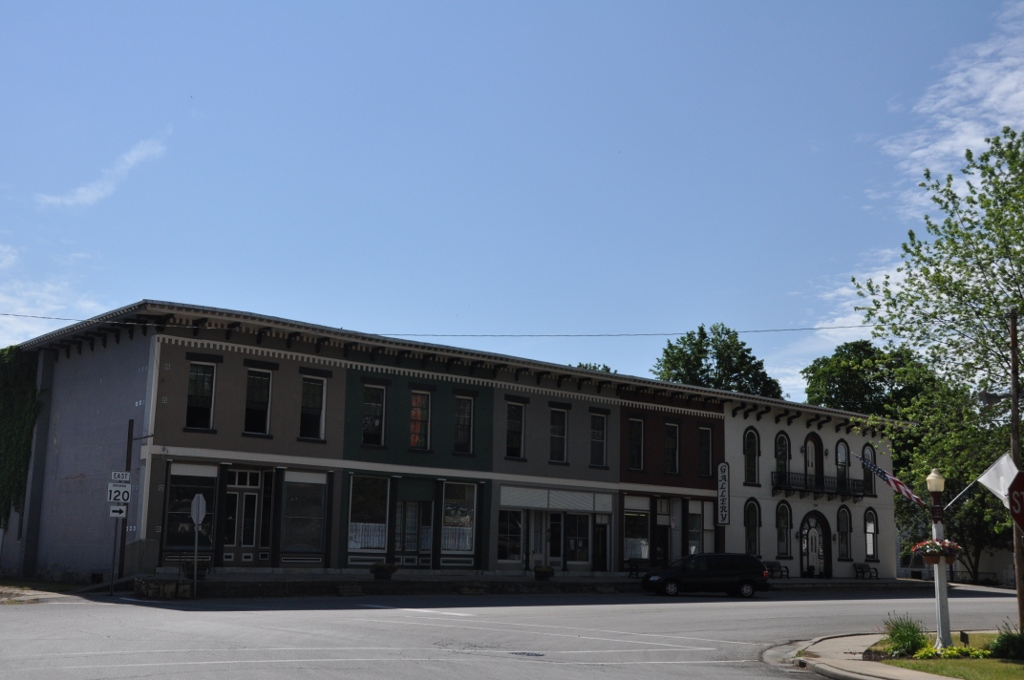
- Shops in the center of Howe

- Location in LaGrange County, Indiana

- Location in Indiana Location in the United States
- Coordinates: 41°43′22″N 85°25′32″W
- Country: United States
- State: Indiana
- County: LaGrange
- Township: Lima

Area
  - Total: 1.79 sq mi (4.63 km^{2})
  - Land: 1.79 sq mi (4.63 km^{2})
  - Water: 0 sq mi (0.00 km^{2})
- Elevation: 876 ft (267 m)

Population (2020)
  - Total: 610
  - Density: 341.2/sq mi (131.74/km^{2})
- ZIP code: 46746
- FIPS code: 18-34978
- GNIS feature ID: 2629774

Howe is an unincorporated community and census-designated place in Lima Township, LaGrange County, Indiana. As of the 2020 census, Howe had a population of 610.

== History ==
Howe was settled in 1834. At that time, it was named "Mongoquinong", a name that the Potawatomi people had given to the prairie in northeastern Indiana. Shortly thereafter it was renamed "Lima" and was, at that time, the county seat. It was later renamed "Howe" after John B. Howe, a local attorney.

The Howe Military School, the town's most famous attraction, was founded in 1884.

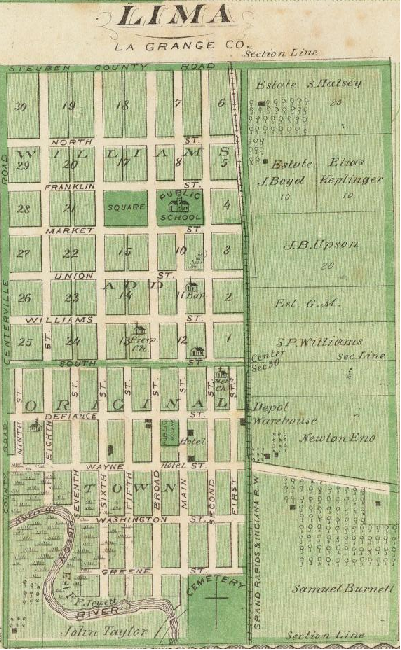
Lima, Indiana (now Howe) in 1876

=== Local places on the National Register ===
Sites in Howe on the National Register of Historic Places are:

- John Badlam Howe Mansion, also known as the Howe Military School Rectory
- Lima Township School
- St. James Memorial Chapel
- Star Milling and Electric Company Historic District
- Samuel P. Williams House

Kingsbury Hotel

== Geography ==
Howe is located in northern LaGrange County at the intersection of State Road 120 and State Road 9. It is the principal community in Lima Township. It is 2 miles (3 km) south of Interstate 80/90 (the Indiana Toll Road), and 5 miles (8 km) north of LaGrange, the county seat.

According to the U.S. Census Bureau, the Howe census-designated place has an area of 1.8 square miles (4.6 km^{2}), all of it recorded as land. The Pigeon River, a tributary of the St. Joseph River, flows westward along the southern edge of the community.

== Demographics ==
Historical population
Census	Pop.	Note	%±
2010	807		—
2020	610		−24.4%
U.S. Decennial Census

== Notable person ==
- Marlin Stutzman, U.S. representative, former state senator and state representative
