= Amish in Indiana =

Amish community in Indiana

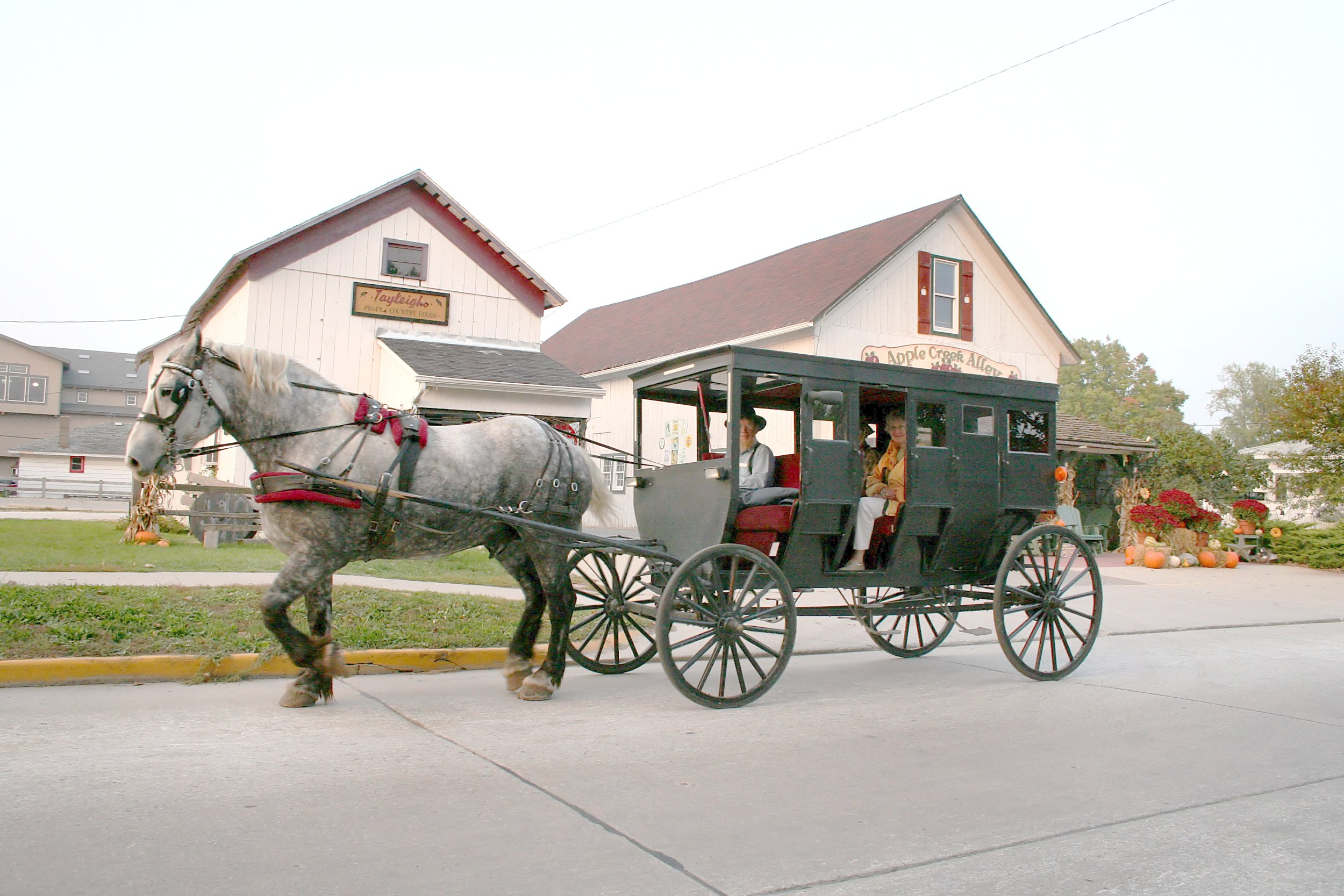
Amish buggy offering tourist rides in Shipshewana, Indiana

The state of Indiana is home to a large Amish population, estimated at 68,025 in 2026, the third-largest behind the states of Ohio and Pennsylvania. Around 1 in 7, or 16% of all Amish in the United States reside in Indiana. The largest numbers of Amish are primarily concentrated in the northeast of the state, however, smaller communities in the south also exist.

== Locations ==
=== Adams County ===
Adams County has the second-largest grouping of Amish in the state behind the Elkhart/LaGrange County region, with an estimated 11,055 adherents in 2025. The population in the county is primarily Swiss Amish. Amish settlement in the county began in the 1850s around the town of Berne.

=== Allen County ===
Amish settlement in Allen County began in 1853, when a group of Amish families migrated to the area from Stark County, Ohio, and before that the area surrounding the town of Montbéliard in France. In 2020, Allen County had an Amish population of 4,577.

=== Elkhart/LaGrange County ===
The combined Amish population in Elkhart and LaGrange counties in northern Indiana was 29,905 in 2025, making it the third-largest Amish settlement in the United States and the largest in Indiana. In 1986, roughly 75% of the farming population of LaGrange County was Old Order Amish. Due to their lifestyle, as well as their decision to not attend higher education, their high population has negatively affected the county's per-capita and educational attainment levels. As of 2020, LaGrange County was over one-third Amish. In 2002, Amish settlements in the two counties had an average of 139 members.

Amish settlement in the region first began in 1841, after a group of four Amish began exploring land in the Midwest to establish a settlement. The group initially decided on land in Iowa, however while returning to their settlement in Pennsylvania they visited land near Goshen and decided to settle there instead. Four Amish families moved to the area the following year. At the time of their arrival, the Amish lifestyle did not differ significantly from that of their non-Amish counterparts in the county, with many non-Amish even speaking German. By the First World War, with the advent of new technologies, the Amish had become more of an ethnic enclave in the region. In 1874, the Illustrated Atlas of LaGrange County wrote of the Amish in the county as a "peculiar class of people... found mostly in Newbury and Eden.", and referred to them as "generally good farmers". In Newbury Township, the Amish owned nearly half of the real estate value and around 36 percent of "improved" land in the township.

The Menno-Hof Amish & Mennonite Museum, a museum which displays the history of both groups, is located in Shipshewana, in LaGrange County.

=== Parke County ===
In 1991, two Amish families moved from Lancaster County, Pennsylvania in Pennsylvania and began a settlement in Parke County, primarily due to overpopulation in Pennsylvania. In 2020, Parke County had a population of 1,351 Amish adherents.

== Population ==
Evolution of the Amish population in Indiana in recent years
Year	Pop.	±% p.a.
1992	23,405	—
2000	32,840	+4.32%
2010	43,710	+2.90%
2020	59,305	+3.10%
2021	60,960	+2.79%
2022	62,800	+3.02%
2023	63,645	+1.35%
2024	65,540	+2.98%
2025	67,310	+2.70%
2026	68,025	+1.06%
Sources: 1992, 2000, 2010, 2020s

In 2026, estimates from Elizabethtown College in Pennsylvania placed the Amish population in Indiana at 68,025, which accounted for .97% of the overall population, the highest percentage of any state in the country. In 2020, there were roughly 8.4 Amish for every 1,000 people in Indiana.

Counties in Indiana by population (2020)
County	Amish population (2020)
Adams	8,088
Allen	4,577
Clark	64
Crawford	64
Daviess	5,106
Decatur	46
Elkhart	7,886
Fayette	62
Fulton	16
Henry	249
Howard	86
Jay	1,272
Jefferson	207
Jennings	162
Kosciusko	2,472
LaGrange	17,567
Lawrence	234
Marshall	1,636
Martin	33
Miami	103
Noble	1,589
Orange	523
Parke	1,351
Randolph	95
Ripley	148
Rush	275
St. Joseph	172
Steuben	187
Switzerland	470
Washington	811
Wayne	1,045
Wells	110
Whitley	266
