= Adams Lake, Indiana =

Adams Lake
- Census-designated place
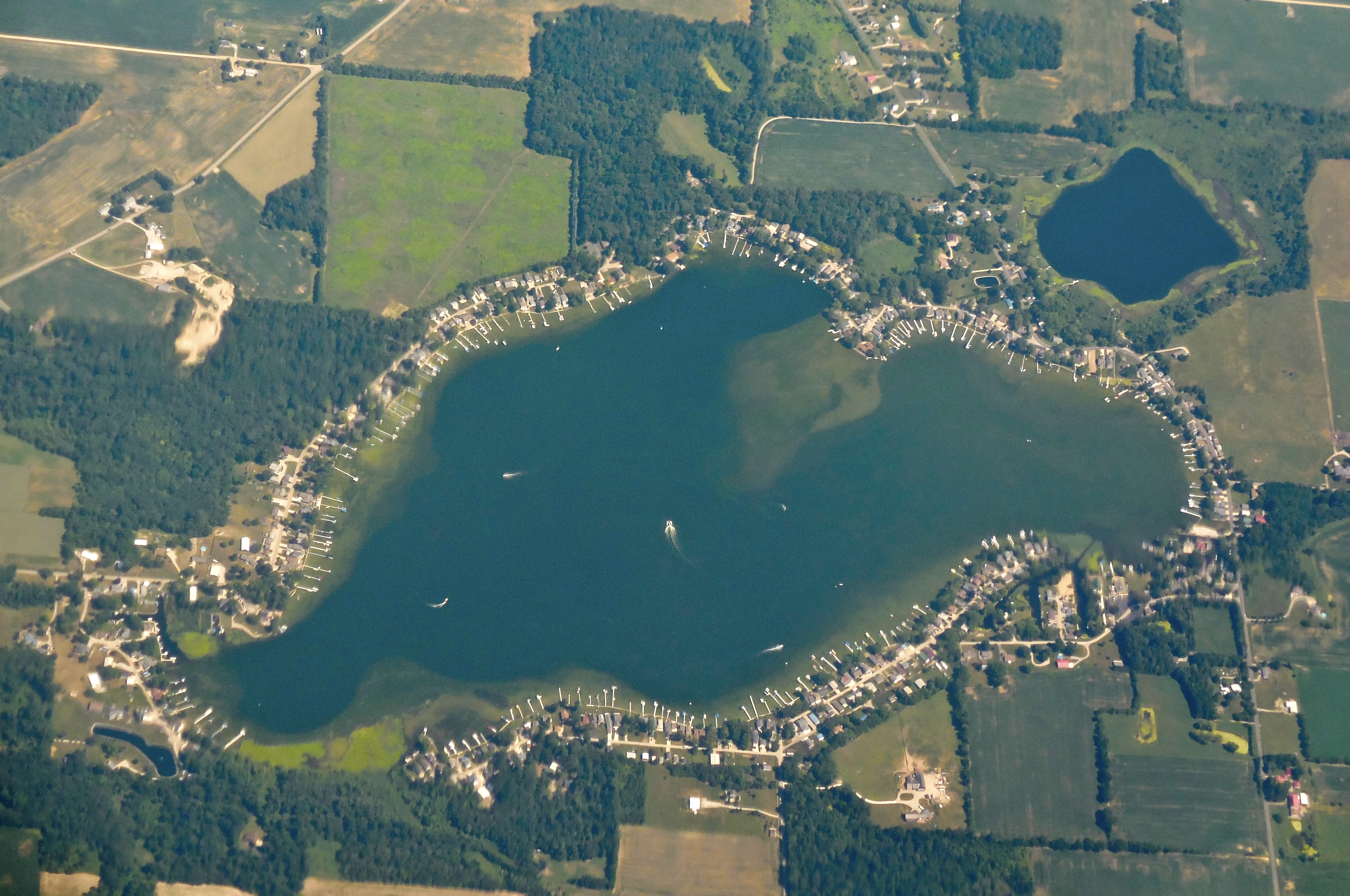
- Aerial view of Adams Lake

- Location within Indiana Location within the United States
- Coordinates: 41°33′13″N 85°19′49″W
- Country: United States
- State: Indiana
- County: LaGrange
- Township: Johnson

Area
  - Total: 0.83 sq mi (2.1 km^{2})
  - Land: 0.41 sq mi (1.1 km^{2})
  - Water: 0.42 sq mi (1.1 km^{2})
- Elevation: 955 ft (291 m)
- Time zone: UTC-5 (Eastern (EST))
  - Summer (DST): UTC-4 (EDT)
- ZIP code: 46795 (Wolcottville)
- Area code: 260
- FIPS code: 18-00532
- GNIS feature ID: 2830435

Adams Lake is an unincorporated community and census-designated place (CDP) in LaGrange County, Indiana, United States.

== Geography ==
The community is in southeastern LaGrange County, surrounding the natural water body of Adams Lake. It is 2 miles (3 km) northeast of Wolcottville and 9 miles (14 km) southeast of LaGrange, the county seat.

According to the U.S. Census Bureau, the Adams Lake CDP has a total area of 0.83 square miles (2.15 km^{2}), of which 0.41 square miles (1.06 km^{2}) are land and 0.42 square miles (1.09 km^{2}), or 50.06%, are water. The lake drains at its south end into an unnamed creek which flows south to Little Elkhart Creek, a west-flowing tributary of the North Branch of the Elkhart River, part of the St. Joseph River watershed leading to Lake Michigan.

== Demographics ==
The United States Census Bureau delineated Adams Lake as a census designated place in the 2022 American Community Survey.
