= Adams Lake (disambiguation) =

Adams Lake is a water body in British Columbia, Canada.

The name may also refer to:

- Adams Lake, Indiana, a census-designated place and water body in the United States
- Adams Lake (Portage County, Wisconsin), a water body in the United States
