= Plato, Indiana =

- Unincorporated community
- Location within Indiana Location within the United States
- Coordinates: 41°38′32″N 85°19′54″W
- Country: United States
- State: Indiana
- County: LaGrange
- Township: Bloomfield
- Elevation: 935 ft (285 m)
- ZIP code: 46761
- FIPS code: 18-60300
- GNIS feature ID: 441228

Plato is an unincorporated community in Bloomfield Township, LaGrange County, Indiana.

== History ==
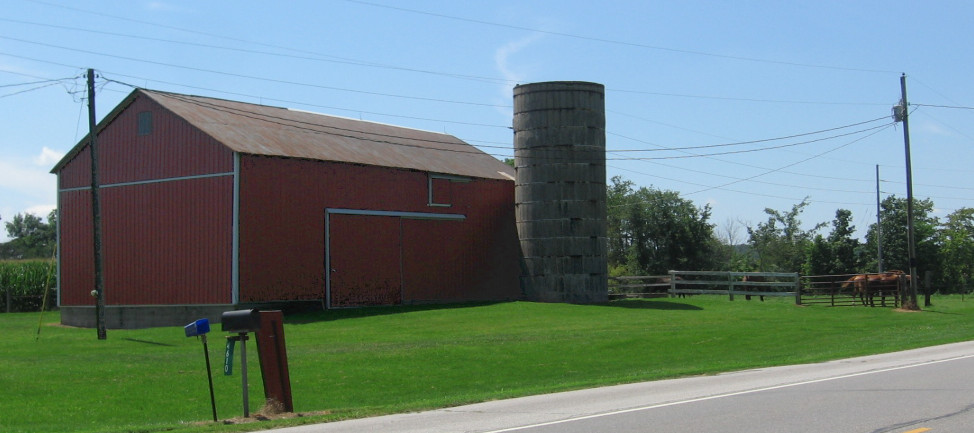
Plato and the surrounding area is dedicated to farming with some artisan craft work. This barn is typical of many in the area.

A post office opened at Plato in 1890, and remained in operation until it was discontinued in 1901. The community was likely named for the philosopher Plato.
