= Newbury Township =

Newbury Township may refer to the following townships in the United States:

- Newbury Township, LaGrange County, Indiana
- Newbury Township, Geauga County, Ohio
