= Honeyville =

Honeyville may refer to:

- Honeyville, Indiana
- Honeyville, Utah
- Honeyville, Virginia
