= Menno Yoder Polygonal Barn =

- Yoder, Menno, Polygonal Barn
- U.S. National Register of Historic Places
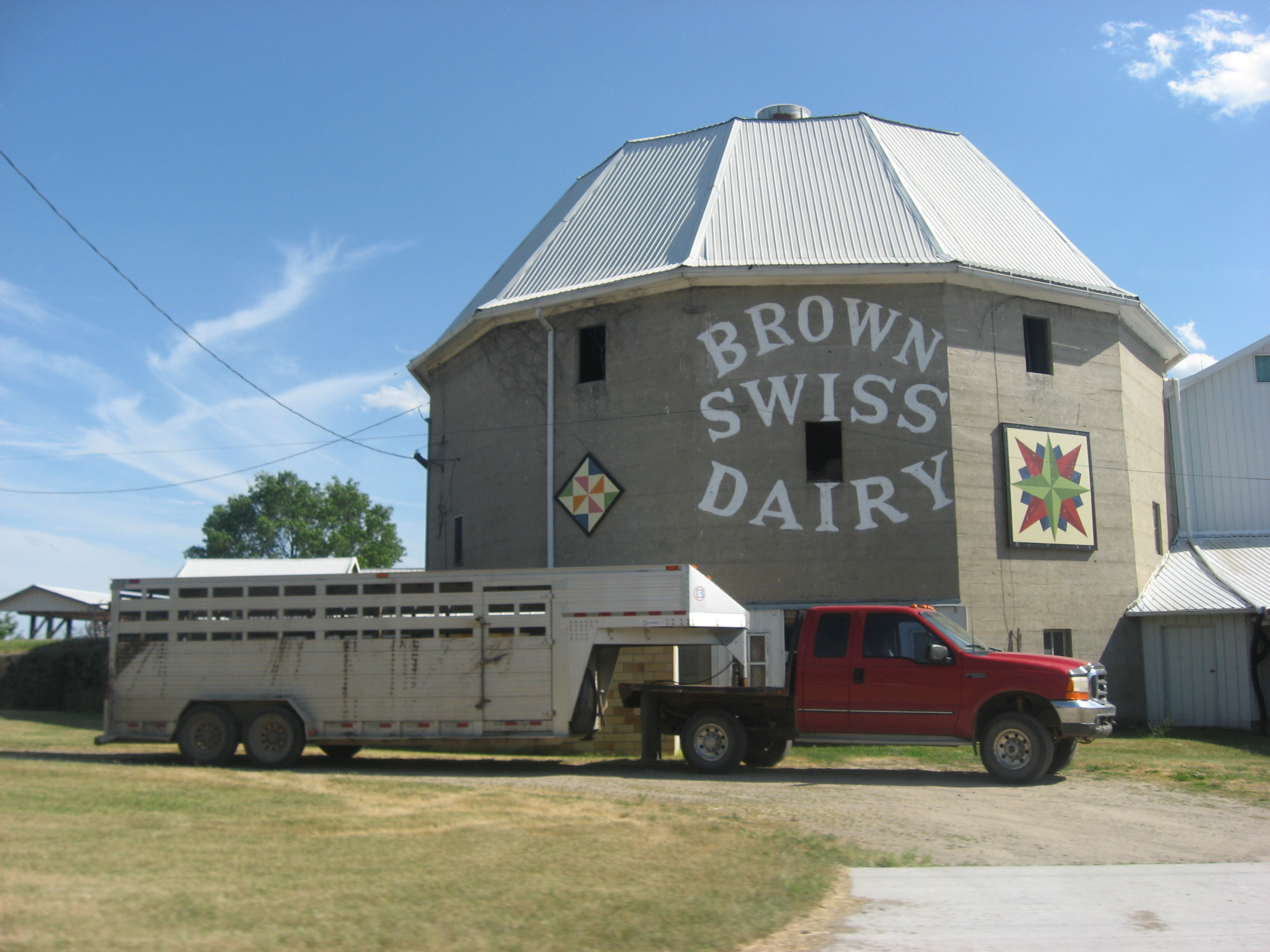
- Northern sides of the Menno Yoder Polygonal Barn built in 1908

- Location within Indiana Location within the United States
- Location: 8690 W250N, west of Shipshewana in Newbury Township, LaGrange County, Indiana
- Coordinates: 41°40′30″N 85°35′47″W
- Area: less than one acre
- Built: 1908
- Built by: Yoder, Menno
- Architectural style: Twelve-sided barn
- MPS: Round and Polygonal Barns of Indiana MPS
- NRHP reference No.: 93000191
- Added to NRHP: April 2, 1993

The Menno Yoder barn is one of the two remaining poured concrete polygonal barns in the United States state of Indiana. Built on the outskirts of Shipshewana in 1908 by Menno Yoder, this 12-sided barn has been expanded upon. It is known as the Brown Swiss Dairy barn. A gravel drive extends to the barn, passing the 1911 concrete farmhouse. The polygonal barn consists of the original 1908 12-sided barn, a 1911 attached silo, a c. 1920 rectangular addition, and a 1960s one-story addition. Next to the barn is a freestanding c. 1950 milk house.

Cultivated fields lie to the south and west.

== Exterior ==
The 12-sided, two-storied structure has a two-pitch sectional gambrel with a metal aerator at the top. The one-story 1960s barn on the northwest side has a gambrel roof that covers the gap between the polygonal barn and the two-story c. 1920 barn behind. The barn is on the southwest side and has a shallow-pitch, gabled roof, which wraps around the barn. A small, rectangular addition on the south side of the barn was erected around 1960. The rectangular barn is two stories tall.

All roofs are metal and feature slight overhanging eaves and exposed rafters. Walls of the polygonal barn are of poured concrete, which were never painted or finished. The c. 1920 barn has vertical, wood-sided walls, and the c. 1960 barn has glazed block walls. All foundations are of concrete.

== Interior ==
A central drive runs from north to south, connecting the two lower-level doors. On either side are pens for horses and cattle, with four horse stalls on either side at the north end and six cattle stalls on either side at the south end. A small walkway is between the horse and cattle stalls and another walkway next to the outside walls at the south end of the barn. Behind the stalls on both the east- and west sides are smaller open areas with feed alleys that served as low pens for sheep and calves. Additionally, a set of stairs to the upper levelis in the northeast corner of the barn, and a bull stall is in the northwest corner. The upper level consists of a large haymow for the storage of hay and straw, and the roof's system is readily visible. Windows help to provide light to the upper level, where laminated beams serve as the main support between the two different roof sections. Additionally, another laminated beam is placed near the roof's apex to offer support for the metal aerator that successfully ventilates the upper reaches of the barn. The only door on the upper level is the one on the east that is served by the ramp, and the stairs to the lower level are located in the northeast quadrant. The ground level is composed of many pens on either side of a main walkway running north to south. A shorter walkway connects this main walk to the 12-sided barn, with the smaller walk running east–west. The upper floors are open for the storage of hay and straw. The northern barn, being one story, has only attic space above the lower level.

== Significance ==
The Yoder Polygonal Barn is one of few masonry barns in the state, and one of only two remaining polygonal concrete structures in Indiana. The barn is an important and direct link to the agricultural development that occurred in the state from 1850 to 1936. The period of significance of the barn is 1908–1936. After 1936, round and polygonal barns were considered obsolete.

== Bibliography ==
- "A Concrete Barn". The Indiana Farmer, vol. LXV, no. 13, May 8, 1909, p. 2.
- Hanou, John. Research compiled on Indiana's round and polygonal barns from 1986 to present. Archived at Historic Landmarks Foundation of Indiana, 340 West Michigan Street, Indianapolis, IN 46202. Intensive architectural survey of Indiana's round and polygonal barns, Conducted June to August 1991, conducted by Jerry McMahan, area wide survey of round and polygonal architectural and historical resources.
- Rolfe, AL . Two Barns of Unique Design". Country Life, vol. XX, October 1, 1911, pp. 62 and 68.
- Soike, Lowell J.; Without Right Angles, the Round Barns of Iowa; Des Moines, IA: Iowa State Historical Department, Office of Historic Preservation, 1983.
- Yoder, Menno S. "A Concrete Barn". The Dakota Farmer, April 15, 1910, pp. 14–15.
- Yoder, Menno S. "Building a Concrete Silo". The Farmer's Guide, vol. XXIII, no. December 16, 1911, p. 4.
- Yoder, Menno S. "Twelve-sided Cement Barn". The Farmer's Guide, vol. XX, no. 25, June 20, 1908, p. 1. vol. XX, no., August 21, 1908, p. 7. vol. XX, December 12, 1908, p. 5.
- Yoder, Menno S. "Yoder's Cement Barn". Hoard's Dairyman, vol. XL, no. 2, January 8, 1919, p. 1355. "Yoder's Stable Plans". vol. XL, no. 11, April 16, 1909, p. l.
