= Greenfield Township, Indiana =

Greenfield Township is the name of two townships in the U.S. state of Indiana:

- Greenfield Township, LaGrange County, Indiana
- Greenfield Township, Orange County, Indiana
