= Johnson Township, Indiana =

Johnson Township is the name of eight townships in the U.S. state of Indiana:

- Johnson Township, Clinton County, Indiana
- Johnson Township, Crawford County, Indiana
- Johnson Township, Gibson County, Indiana
- Johnson Township, Knox County, Indiana
- Johnson Township, LaGrange County, Indiana
- Johnson Township, LaPorte County, Indiana
- Johnson Township, Ripley County, Indiana
- Johnson Township, Scott County, Indiana
