= Woodruff, Indiana =

- Unincorporated community
- Location within Indiana Location within the United States
- Coordinates: 41°34′24″N 85°19′44″W
- Country: United States
- State: Indiana
- County: LaGrange
- Township: Johnson
- Elevation: 971 ft (296 m)
- ZIP code: 46795
- FIPS code: 18-85454
- GNIS feature ID: 446303

Woodruff is an unincorporated community in Johnson Township, LaGrange County, Indiana.

Allen Woodruff was the name of an early postmaster.
