= Emma, Indiana =

- Unincorporated community
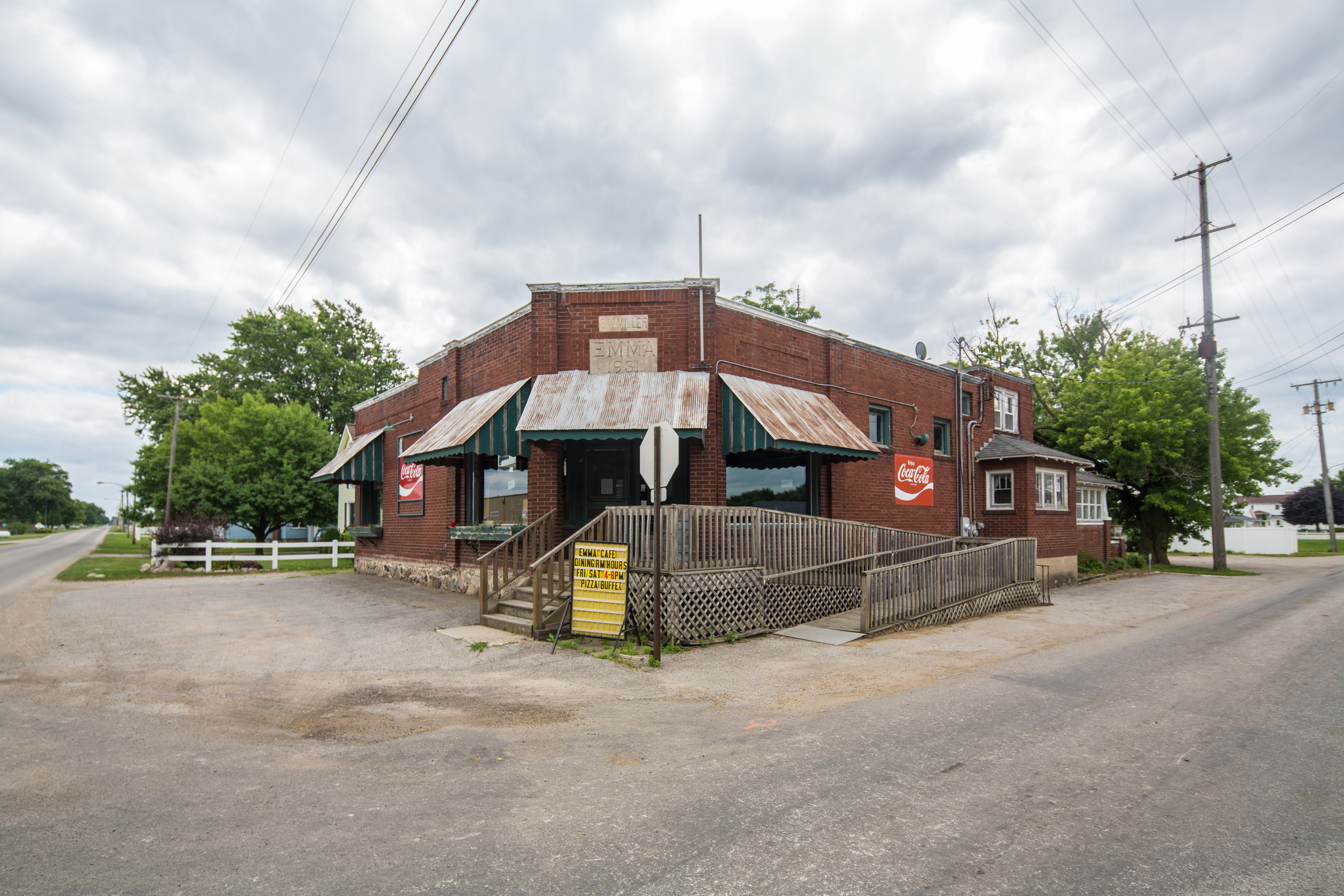

- Location within Indiana Location within the United States
- Coordinates: 41°36′40″N 85°32′28″W
- Country: United States
- State: Indiana
- County: LaGrange
- Township: Eden
- Elevation: 889 ft (271 m)
- ZIP code: 46571
- FIPS code: 18-21142
- GNIS feature ID: 434168

Emma is an unincorporated community in Eden Township, LaGrange County, Indiana.

== History ==
Emma once contained a post office which was first called Eden Mills. The post office operated as Eden Mills from 1868 until 1875, was renamed Emma in 1880, and closed in 1903.
