= Valentine, Indiana =

- Unincorporated community
- Location within Indiana Location within the United States
- Coordinates: 41°35′25″N 85°23′13″W
- Country: United States
- State: Indiana
- County: LaGrange
- Township: Johnson
- Elevation: 955 ft (291 m)
- ZIP code: 46761
- FIPS code: 18-78164
- GNIS feature ID: 445187

Valentine is an unincorporated community in Johnson Township, LaGrange County, Indiana.

== History ==
Valentine was laid out and platted in 1879. The Valentine post office closed in 1926.
