= Cree Lake, Indiana =

- Census-designated place
- Location within Indiana Location within the United States
- Coordinates: 41°30′25″N 85°16′25″W
- Country: United States
- State: Indiana
- County: Noble
- Township: Wayne

Area
  - Total: 0.734 sq mi (1.90 km^{2})
  - Land: 0.637 sq mi (1.65 km^{2})
  - Water: 0.097 sq mi (0.25 km^{2})
- Elevation: 945 ft (288 m)
- Time zone: UTC-5 (Eastern (EST))
  - Summer (DST): UTC-4 (EDT)
- ZIP code: 46755 (Kendallville)
- Area code: 260
- GNIS feature ID: 2830480
- FIPS code: 18-15778

Cree Lake is an unincorporated community and census-designated place (CDP) in Noble County, Indiana, United States.

== Geography ==
Cree Lake is in northeastern Noble County, surrounding the natural lake of the same name. Indiana State Road 3 passes through the community, following the west side of the lake; it leads south 4 miles (6 km) to Kendallville and north 16 miles (26 km) to its terminus at Brighton, 2 miles (3 km) south of the Michigan border.

According to the U.S. Census Bureau, the Cree Lake CDP has an area of 0.73 square miles (1.89 km^{2}), of which 0.64 square miles (1.66 km^{2}) are land and 0.10 square miles (0.26 km^{2}), or 13.22%, are water. The lake outlet at its north end drains to Little Elkhart Creek, which flows west to the North Branch of the Elkhart River, part of the St. Joseph River watershed leading to Lake Michigan.

== Demographics ==
The United States Census Bureau delineated Cree Lake as a census designated place in the 2022 American Community Survey.
