= Stroh, Indiana =

- Unincorporated community
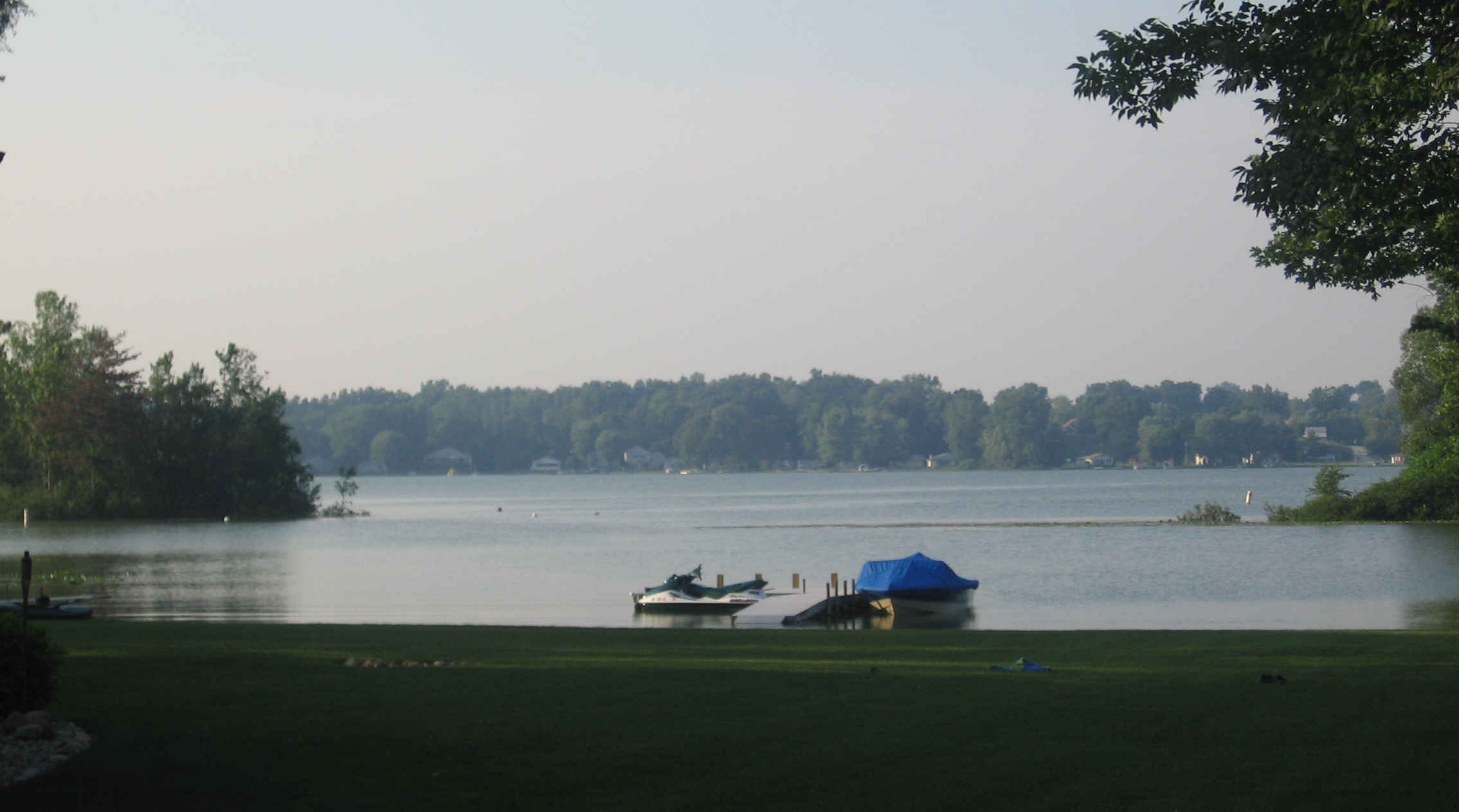
- Looking north from Stroh toward Big Turkey Lake

- Location within Indiana Location within the United States
- Coordinates: 41°34′57″N 85°11′57″W
- Country: United States
- State: Indiana
- County: LaGrange
- Township: Milford
- Elevation: 935 ft (285 m)
- Time zone: UTC-5 (Eastern Standard Time)
  - Summer (DST): UTC-4 (Eastern Daylight Time)
- ZIP code: 46761 (La Grange); 46789 (Stroh)
- Area codes: 260, 574
- FIPS code: 18-73790
- GNIS feature ID: 2830441

Stroh is an unincorporated community in Milford Township, LaGrange County, Indiana, USA.

The Stroh post office was established in 1900.

The settlement has five church buildings, Stroh church of God, Stroh church of Christ, Baptist church, Calvary Chapel, Mt Calvery church.

== Geography ==
Stroh is located on the southwestern shore of Big Turkey Lake.

== Demographics ==
Historical population
Census	Pop.	Note	%±
2023 (est.)	284

The United States Census Bureau defined Stroh as a census designated place in the 2022 American Community Survey.
