= Milford Township, LaGrange County, Indiana =

Milford Township
- Township
- Coordinates: 41°34′14″N 85°15′06″W
- Country: United States
- State: Indiana
- County: LaGrange

Government
  - Type: Indiana township

Area
  - Total: 35.47 sq mi (91.9 km^{2})
  - Land: 33.82 sq mi (87.6 km^{2})
  - Water: 1.66 sq mi (4.3 km^{2})
- Elevation: 988 ft (301 m)

Population (2020)
  - Total: 2,911
  - Density: 84.8/sq mi (32.7/km^{2})
- FIPS code: 18-49338
- GNIS feature ID: 453625

Historical population
Census	Pop.	Note	%±
1960	1,825		—
1970	2,189		19.9%
1980	2,297		4.9%
1990	2,548		10.9%
2000	2,955		16.0%
2010	2,868		−2.9%
2020	2,911		1.5%
U.S. Census:

Milford Township is one of eleven townships in LaGrange County, Indiana. As of the 2020 census, its population was 2,911 (up from 2,868 at 2010) and it contained 1,736 housing units.

Milford Township was established in 1837.

== Geography ==
According to the 2010 census, the township has a total area of 35.47 square miles (91.9 km^{2}), of which 33.82 square miles (87.6 km^{2}) (or 95.35%) is land and 1.66 square miles (4.3 km^{2}) (or 4.68%) is water.

=== Unincorporated towns ===
- Elmira
- Lakeside Park
- Meadow Shores Park
- South Milford
- Stroh

(This list is based on USGS data and may include former settlements.)
