= Honeyville, Indiana =

- Unincorporated community
- Location within Indiana Location within the United States
- Coordinates: 41°34′54″N 85°36′06″W
- Country: United States
- State: Indiana
- County: LaGrange
- Township: Eden
- Elevation: 899 ft (274 m)
- ZIP code: 46571
- FIPS code: 18-34600
- GNIS feature ID: 436400

Honeyville is an unincorporated community in Eden Township, LaGrange County, Indiana.
