= Clay Township, LaGrange County, Indiana =

Clay Township
- Township
- Coordinates: 41°39′04″N 85°28′41″W
- Country: United States
- State: Indiana
- County: LaGrange

Government
  - Type: Indiana township

Area
  - Total: 36.2 sq mi (94 km^{2})
  - Land: 36.14 sq mi (93.6 km^{2})
  - Water: 0.05 sq mi (0.13 km^{2})
- Elevation: 920 ft (280 m)

Population (2020)
  - Total: 3,823
  - Density: 105.8/sq mi (40.84/km^{2})
- FIPS code: 18-13132
- GNIS feature ID: 453213

Clay Township is one of eleven townships in LaGrange County, Indiana. As of the 2020 census, its population was 3,823, up from 3,424 at the previous census.

According to the 2020 "ACS 5-Year Estimates Data Profiles", 24.4% of the township's population spoke only English, while 70.6 spoke an "other [than Spanish] Indo-European language" (basically Pennsylvania German/German).

== Geography ==
According to the 2010 census, the township has a total area of 36.2 square miles (94 km^{2}), of which 36.14 square miles (93.6 km^{2}) (or 99.83%) is land and 0.05 square miles (0.13 km^{2}) (or 0.14%) is water.

== Demographics ==
Historical population
Census	Pop.	Note	%±
1920	905		—
1930	928		2.5%
1940	1,011		8.9%
1950	1,077		6.5%
1960	1,380		28.1%
1970	1,742		26.2%
1980	2,213		27.0%
1990	2,485		12.3%
2000	2,888		16.2%
2010	3,424		18.6%
2020	3,823		11.7%
U.S. Censuses:
