= South Milford, Indiana =

- Unincorporated community
- Location within Indiana Location within the United States
- Coordinates: 41°31′55″N 85°15′59″W
- Country: United States
- State: Indiana
- County: LaGrange
- Township: Milford
- Elevation: 994 ft (303 m)
- ZIP code: 46786
- FIPS code: 18-71396
- GNIS feature ID: 2830440

South Milford is an unincorporated community in Milford Township, LaGrange County, Indiana.

== History ==
South Milford was laid out in 1856. South Milford lies in the southern part of Milford Township, hence the name.

== Demographics ==
Historical population
| Census | Pop. | Note | %± |
|---|---|---|---|
| 2023 (est.) | 243 |

The United States Census Bureau defined South Milford as a census designated place in the 2022 American Community Survey.
