= Ontario, Indiana =

- Unincorporated community Census designated place
- Location within Indiana Location within the United States
- Coordinates: 41°41′55″N 85°22′47″W
- Country: United States
- State: Indiana
- County: LaGrange
- Township: Lima
- Elevation: 883 ft (269 m)
- ZIP code: 46746
- FIPS code: 18-56646
- GNIS feature ID: 2830437

Ontario is an unincorporated community in Lima Township, LaGrange County, Indiana.

== History ==
Ontario was laid out in 1837. The community took its name from Lake Ontario. A post office opened at Ontario in 1846, and remained in operation until it was discontinued in 1943.

== Demographics ==
The United States Census Bureau defined Ontario as a census designated place in the 2022 American Community Survey.
