= Brighton, Indiana =

- Unincorporated community
- Location within Indiana Location within the United States
- Coordinates: 41°43′20″N 85°18′40″W
- Country: United States
- State: Indiana
- County: LaGrange
- Township: Greenfield
- Elevation: 938 ft (286 m)
- ZIP code: 46746
- FIPS code: 18-07642
- GNIS feature ID: 431527

Brighton is an unincorporated community in Greenfield Township, LaGrange County, Indiana.

== History ==
Brighton was originally called Lexington, and under the latter name was laid out in 1836. A post office called Brighton was established in 1837, and remained in operation until it was discontinued in 1911.
