= Wolcottville, Indiana =

- Town
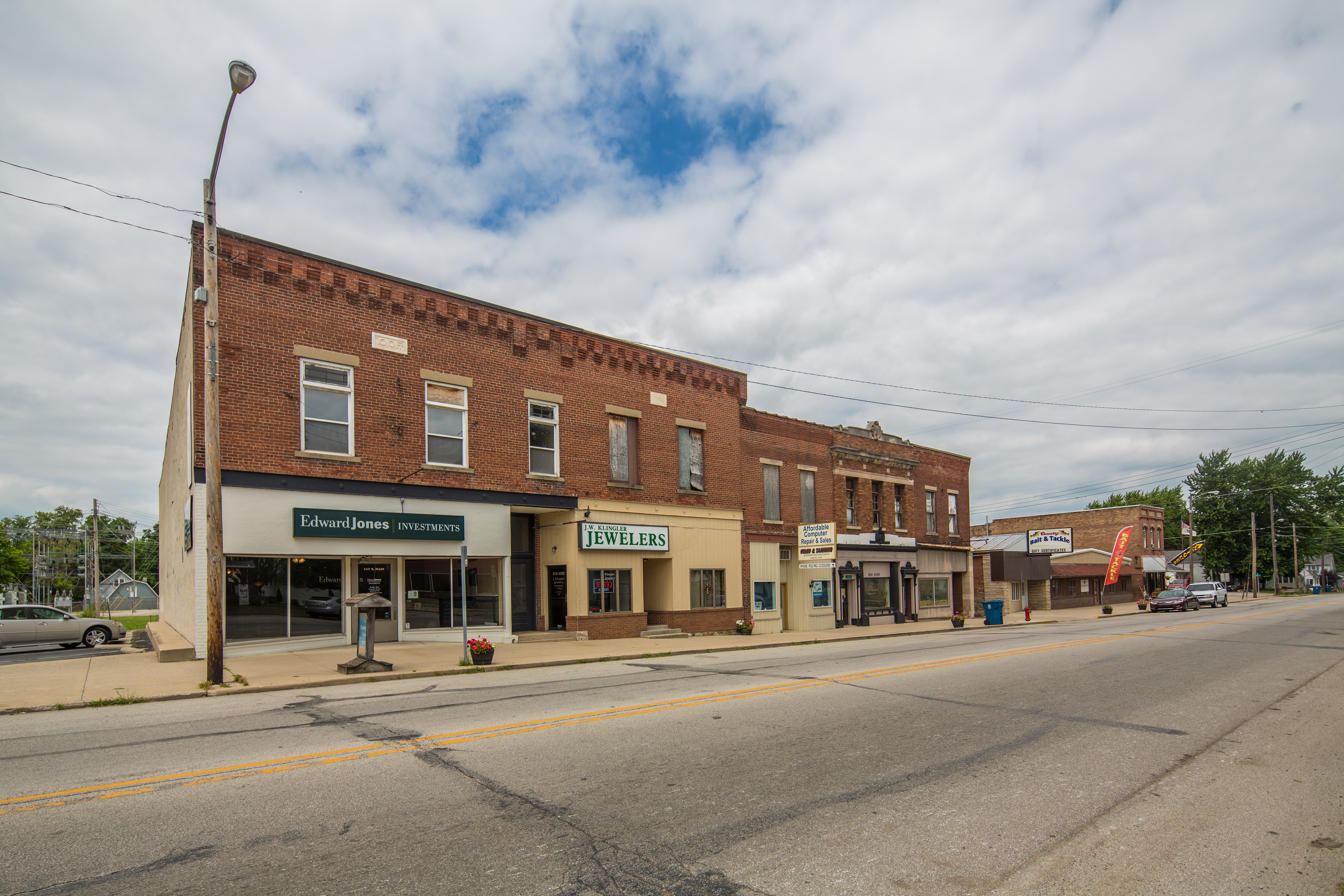

- Location of Wolcottville in Noble County and LaGrange County, Indiana.
- Coordinates: 41°31′31″N 85°22′00″W
- Country: United States
- State: Indiana
- Counties: Noble, LaGrange
- Townships: Orange, Johnson
- Founded: 1849
- Named for: George Wolcott

Area
  - Total: 1.01 sq mi (2.62 km^{2})
  - Land: 1.01 sq mi (2.62 km^{2})
  - Water: 0 sq mi (0.00 km^{2})
- Elevation: 942 ft (287 m)

Population (2020)
  - Total: 1,004
  - Density: 991.2/sq mi (382.72/km^{2})
- Time zone: UTC-5 (Eastern (EST))
  - Summer (DST): UTC-4 (EDT)
- ZIP code: 46795
- Area code: 260
- FIPS code: 18-85076
- GNIS feature ID: 2397754
- Website: www.in.gov/towns/wolcottville/

Wolcottville is a town in Orange Township, Noble County and Johnson Township, LaGrange County in the U.S. state of Indiana. The population was 1,004 at the 2020 census.

== History ==
Wolcottville was laid out in 1849. It was named for George Wolcott, who started a sawmill at the site in 1838.

== Geography ==
According to the 2010 census, Wolcottville has a total area of 1.02 square miles (2.64 km^{2}), all land. In addition to these year-round residents, many homes in the area are lake cottages occupied only in the summers. Many of the owners of these cottages come from Fort Wayne and South Bend.

== Demographics ==
Historical population
Census	Pop.	Note	%±
1880	428		—
1900	659		—
1910	627		−4.9%
1920	666		6.2%
1930	646		−3.0%
1940	612		−5.3%
1950	672		9.8%
1960	720		7.1%
1970	915		27.1%
1980	890		−2.7%
1990	879		−1.2%
2000	933		6.1%
2010	998		7.0%
2020	1,004		0.6%
U.S. Decennial Census

=== 2010 census ===
As of the census of 2010, there were 998 people, 369 households, and 264 families living in the town. The population density was 988.1 inhabitants per square mile (381.5/km^{2}). There were 434 housing units at an average density of 429.7 per square mile (165.9/km^{2}). The racial makeup of the town was 96.0% White, 0.5% African American, 0.7% Native American, 0.8% Asian, 1.5% from other races, and 0.5% from two or more races. Hispanic or Latino of any race were 1.8% of the population.

There were 369 households, of which 40.9% had children under the age of 18 living with them, 52.6% were married couples living together, 13.6% had a female householder with no husband present, 5.4% had a male householder with no wife present, and 28.5% were non-families. 24.1% of all households were made up of individuals, and 9% had someone living alone who was 65 years of age or older. The average household size was 2.70 and the average family size was 3.21.

The median age in the town was 33.8 years. 29.3% of residents were under the age of 18; 9% were between the ages of 18 and 24; 27.1% were from 25 to 44; 24.1% were from 45 to 64; and 10.3% were 65 years of age or older. The gender makeup of the town was 48.3% male and 51.7% female.

=== 2000 census ===
As of the census of 2000, there were 933 people, 350 households, and 249 families living in the town. The population density was 910.1 inhabitants per square mile (351.4/km^{2}). There were 365 housing units at an average density of 356.0 per square mile (137.5/km^{2}). The racial makeup of the town was 98.82% White, 0.11% African American, 0.21% Native American, 0.11% Asian, 0.21% from other races, and 0.54% from two or more races. Hispanic or Latino of any race were 0.75% of the population.

There were 350 households, out of which 41.1% had children under the age of 18 living with them, 52.0% were married couples living together, 13.1% had a female householder with no husband present, and 28.6% were non-families. 23.7% of all households were made up of individuals, and 8.3% had someone living alone who was 65 years of age or older. The average household size was 2.67 and the average family size was 3.15.

In the town, the population was spread out, with 31.0% under the age of 18, 10.2% from 18 to 24, 31.1% from 25 to 44, 18.2% from 45 to 64, and 9.5% who were 65 years of age or older. The median age was 31 years. For every 100 females, there were 93.2 males. For every 100 females age 18 and over, there were 92.2 males.

The median income for a household in the town was $35,833, and the median income for a family was $36,458. Males had a median income of $30,705 versus $21,902 for females. The per capita income for the town was $16,974. About 9.1% of families and 10.9% of the population were below the poverty line, including 14.9% of those under age 18 and 9.9% of those age 65 or over.

== Education ==
The town of Wolcottville lies in the school district of Lakeland School Corporation. The local schools town residents attend are:

- Wolcott Mills Preschool
- Lakeland Primary School
- Lakeland Intermediate School
- Lakeland Jr/Sr High School

== Notable people ==
- Ken Kercheval, actor
- William L. Taylor, Indiana Attorney General (1898–1903)
