= Elmira, Indiana =

- Unincorporated community
- Location within Indiana Location within the United States
- Coordinates: 41°35′31″N 85°12′16″W
- Country: United States
- State: Indiana
- County: LaGrange
- Township: Milford
- Elevation: 932 ft (284 m)
- ZIP code: 46761
- FIPS code: 18-20944
- GNIS feature ID: 434132

Elmira is an unincorporated community in Milford Township, LaGrange County, Indiana.

It was likely named after Elmira, New York.
