= Shipshewana, Indiana =

- Town
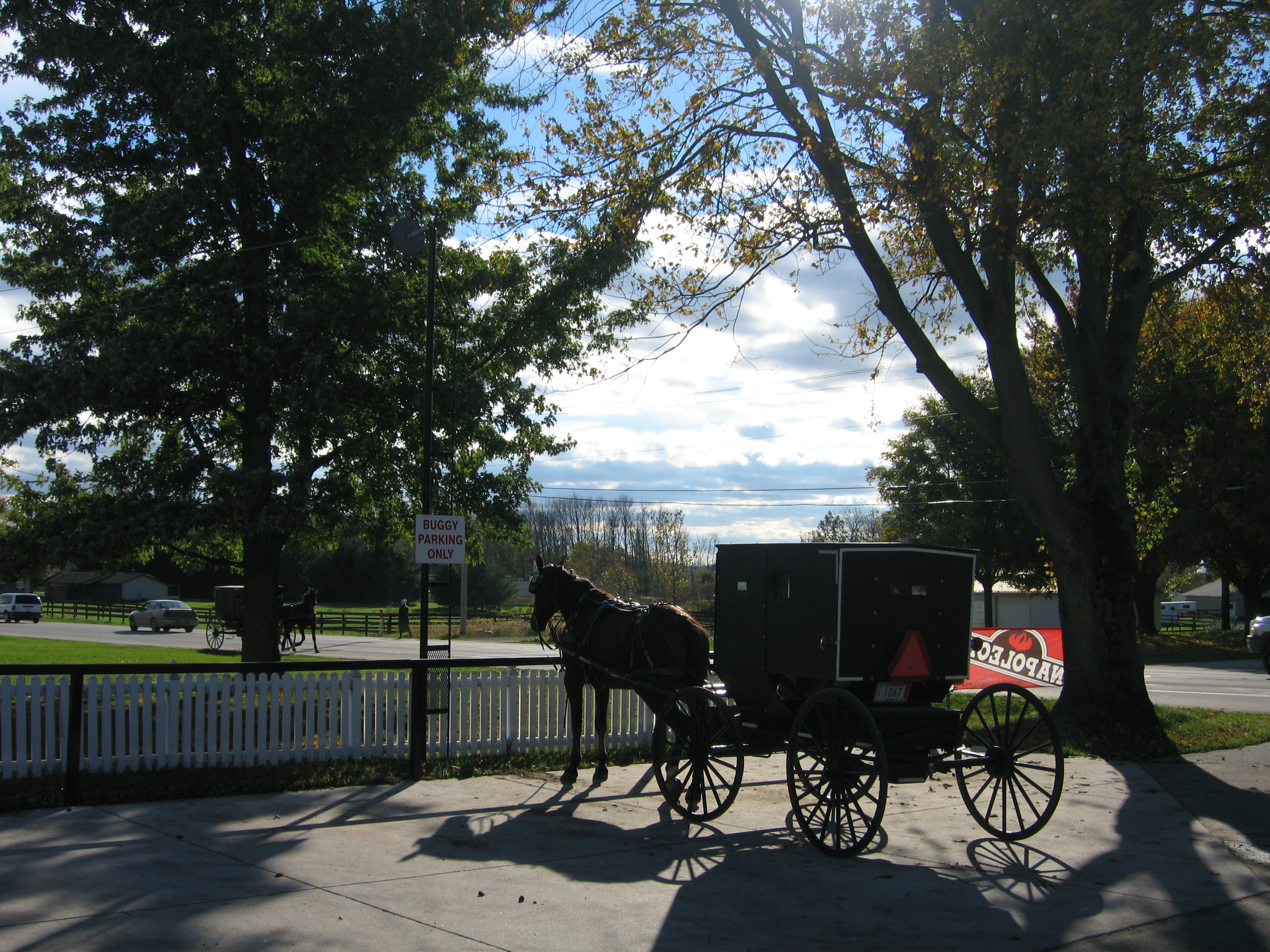

- Logo
- Motto: "A Town of Character"
- Location of Shipshewana in LaGrange County, Indiana
- Coordinates: 41°41′06″N 85°36′23″W
- Country: United States
- State: Indiana
- County: LaGrange
- Township: Newbury

Area
  - Total: 1.36 sq mi (3.53 km^{2})
  - Land: 1.36 sq mi (3.53 km^{2})
  - Water: 0 sq mi (0.00 km^{2})
- Elevation: 853 ft (260 m)

Population (2020)
  - Total: 839
  - Density: 615.0/sq mi (237.44/km^{2})
- Time zone: UTC-5 (Eastern (EST))
  - Summer (DST): UTC-4 (EDT)
- ZIP code: 46565
- Area code: 260
- FIPS code: 18-69480
- GNIS feature ID: 2830439
- Website: www.in.gov/towns/shipshewana/

Shipshewana is a town in Newbury Township, LaGrange County, Indiana, United States. As of the 2020 census, Shipshewana had a population of 839. It is the location of the Menno-Hof Amish and Mennonite Museum, which showcases the history of the Amish and Mennonite peoples.

== History ==
Shipshewana was named after a local Potawatomi Indian. The Shipshewana post office was established in 1889.

== Geography ==
According to the 2010 census, Shipshewana has a total area of 1.18 square miles (3.06 km^{2}), all land.

== Demographics ==
Historical population
Census	Pop.	Note	%±
1920	248		—
1930	262		5.6%
1940	286		9.2%
1950	277		−3.1%
1960	312		12.6%
1970	448		43.6%
1980	466		4.0%
1990	524		12.4%
2000	536		2.3%
2010	658		22.8%
2020	839		27.5%
U.S. Decennial Census

=== 2010 census ===
As of the 2010 census, 658 people, 297 households, and 177 families were in the town. The population density was 557.6 inhabitants per square mile (215.3/km^{2}). The 339 housing units had an average density of 287.3 per square mile (110.9/km^{2}). The racial makeup of the town was 98.3% White, 0.2% African American, 0.5% Native American, 0.2% Asian, 0.3% from other races, and 0.6% from two or more races. Hispanics or Latinos of any race were 0.8% of the population.

Of the 297 households, 26.9% had children under 18 living with them, 47.1% were married couples living together, 9.8% had a female householder with no husband present, 2.7% had a male householder with no wife present, and 40.4% were not families. About 36.4% of all households were made up of individuals, and 14.8% had someone living alone who was 65 or older. The average household size was 2.22, and the average family size was 2.86.

The median age in the town was 37.7 years; the age distribution was 24.2% under 18, 9.8% from 18 to 24, 22.6% from 25 to 44, 21.5% from 45 to 64, and 22.0% were 65 or older. The gender makeup of the town was 44.7% male and 55.3% female.

=== 2000 census ===
As of the census of 2000, 536 people, 235 households, and 149 families were living in the town. The population density was 582.7 inhabitants per square mile (225.0/km^{2}). The 251 housing units had an average density of 272.9 per square mile (105.4/km^{2}). The racial makeup of the town was 97.57% White, 0.37% African American, 0.19% Native American, 0.19% from other races, and 1.68% from two or more races. Hispanics or Latinos of any race were 1.12% of the population.

Of the 235 households, 29.4% had children under 18 living with them, 48.1% were married couples living together, 12.3% had a female householder with no husband present, and 36.2% were not families. About 33.6% of all households were made up of individuals, and 17.4% had someone living alone who was 65 or older. The average household size was 2.28, and the average family size was 2.86.

In the town, the age distribution was 24.1% under 18, 12.7% from 18 to 24, 21.3% from 25 to 44, 23.9% from 45 to 64, and 18.1% who were 65 or older. The median age was 36 years. For every 100 females, there were 79.3 males. For every 100 females 18 and over, there were 79.3 males.

The median income in the town for a household was $30,156 and for a family was $53,214. Males had a median income of $36,875 versus $22,750 for females. The per capita income for the town was $26,270. About 6.0% of families and 8.0% of the population were below the poverty line, including 2.9% of those under 18 and 20.8% of those 65 or over.

== Economy ==
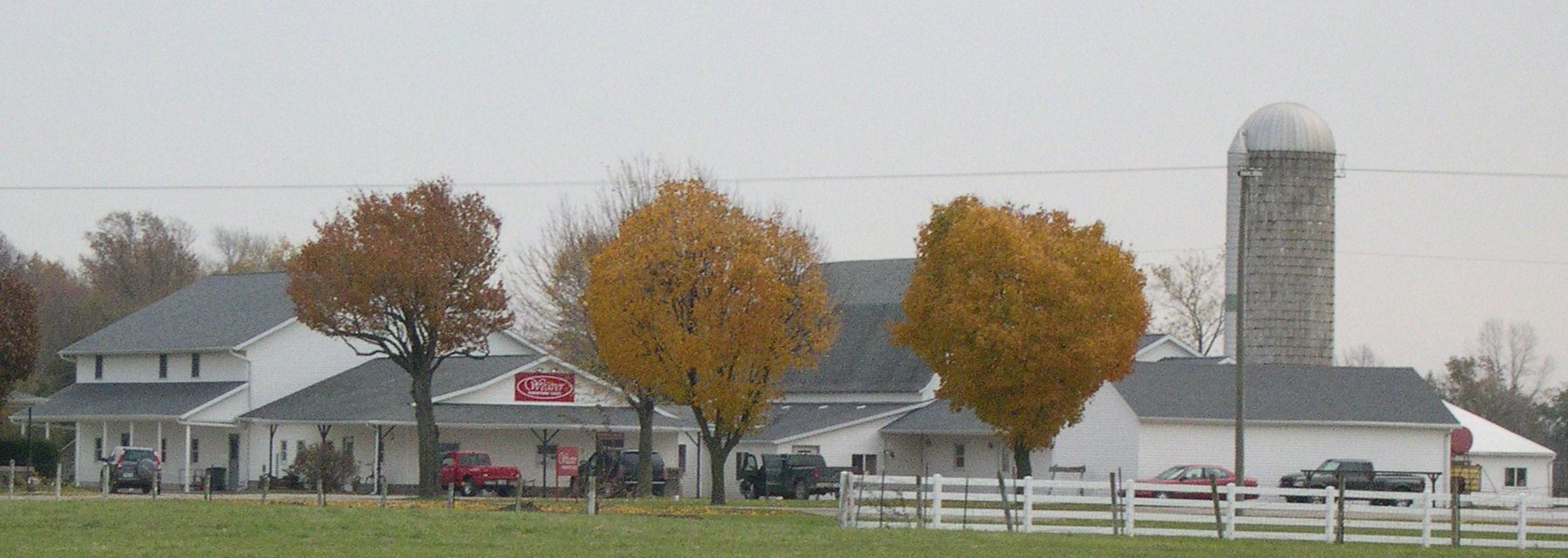
Weaver Furniture

In 2014, the Shipshewana–LaGrange County Convention and Visitor's Bureau commissioned a CERTEC study to gauge the impact of tourism. According to that study, the tourism and travel industry contributed nearly $137.2 million to the LaGrange County economy in 2013.

== Transportation ==
Shipshewana is served by Barons Bus Lines Schedule 0025: Cleveland, Ohio, to Chicago, Illinois; and Schedule 0026: Chicago, Illinois, to Cleveland, Ohio. This is an on-demand bus stop for both schedules 0025 and 0026. Both routes feature local service via primarily US Route 20. These routes are an essential transportation service similar to that of the Essential Air Service, primarily funded by taxpayers.

== Education ==
The town is served by the Westview School Corporation, in nearby Topeka.

Shipshewana has a public library, a branch of the La Grange County Public Library.
