= Adams Lake (Portage County, Wisconsin) =

Lake in the state of Wisconsin, United States

- Second Lake
- Location within Wisconsin Location within the United States
- Location: Wisconsin
- Coordinates: 44°26′12″N 89°22′53″W
- Type: lake
- Basin countries: United States
- Surface elevation: 1,093 ft (333 m)

Adams Lake is a lake in the U.S. state of Wisconsin.

Adams Lake most likely is named after J. C. Adams, who owned land adjacent to the lake. A variant name is "Second Lake".
