= Bloomfield Township, LaGrange County, Indiana =

Bloomfield Township
- Township
- Coordinates: 41°38′56″N 85°21′31″W
- Country: United States
- State: Indiana
- County: LaGrange

Government
  - Type: Indiana township

Area
  - Total: 35.85 sq mi (92.9 km^{2})
  - Land: 35.58 sq mi (92.2 km^{2})
  - Water: 0.27 sq mi (0.70 km^{2})
- Elevation: 945 ft (288 m)

Population (2020)
  - Total: 5,746
  - Density: 152.1/sq mi (58.7/km^{2})
- FIPS code: 18-05752
- GNIS feature ID: 453113
- Website: bloomfieldtownship.org/wp/

Historical population
Census	Pop.	Note	%±
1920	2,465		—
1930	2,400		−2.6%
1940	2,561		6.7%
1950	2,810		9.7%
1960	3,048		8.5%
1970	3,372		10.6%
1980	4,159		23.3%
1990	4,737		13.9%
2000	5,512		16.4%
2010	5,412		−1.8%
2020	5,746		6.2%
U.S. Census:

Bloomfield Township is one of eleven townships in LaGrange County, Indiana. As of the 2020 census, its population was 5,746 (up from 5,412 at the 2010 census), and it contained 2,270 housing units.

== History ==
Bloomfield Township was founded in 1835.

== Geography ==
According to the 2010 census, the township has a total area of 35.85 square miles (92.9 km^{2}), of which 35.58 square miles (92.2 km^{2}) (or 99.25%) is land and 0.27 square miles (0.70 km^{2}) (or 0.75%) is water.
