= Greenfield Township, LaGrange County, Indiana =

Greenfield Township
- Township
- Coordinates: 41°43′32″N 85°16′59″W
- Country: United States
- State: Indiana
- County: LaGrange

Government
  - Type: Indiana township

Area
  - Total: 36.73 sq mi (95.1 km^{2})
  - Land: 36.34 sq mi (94.1 km^{2})
  - Water: 0.39 sq mi (1.0 km^{2})
- Elevation: 935 ft (285 m)

Population (2020)
  - Total: 1,323
  - Density: 35.1/sq mi (13.6/km^{2})
- FIPS code: 18-29538
- GNIS feature ID: 453351

Historical population
Census	Pop.	Note	%±
1960	987		—
1970	1,049		6.3%
1980	1,088		3.7%
1990	1,135		4.3%
2000	1,258		10.8%
2010	1,276		1.4%
2020	1,323		3.7%
U.S. Census:

Greenfield Township is one of eleven townships in LaGrange County, Indiana. As of the 2020 census, its population was 1,323 (up from 1,276 at 2010) and it contained 617 housing units.

Greenfield Township was established in 1832.

== Geography ==
According to the 2010 census, the township has a total area of 36.73 square miles (95.1 km^{2}), of which 36.34 square miles (94.1 km^{2}) (or 98.94%) is land and 0.39 square miles (1.0 km^{2}) (or 1.06%) is water.
