= LaGrange County, Indiana =

County in Indiana, United States

- County
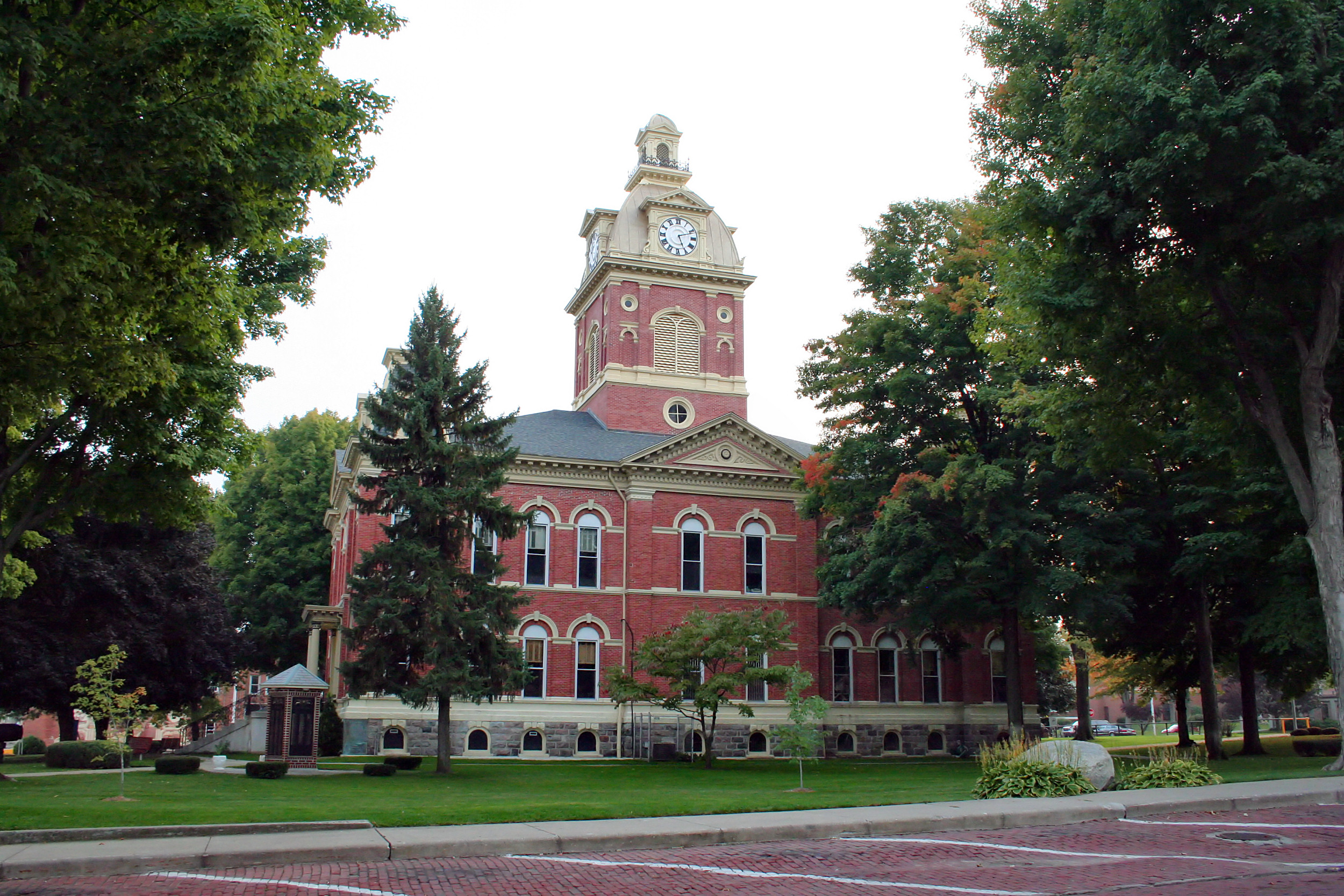
- LaGrange County Courthouse in LaGrange, Indiana. Built in the 1870s, it is now on the National Register of Historic Places.

- Seal

- Location within the U.S. state of Indiana
- Coordinates: 41°38′30″N 85°25′00″W
- Country: United States
- State: Indiana
- Founded: 1832
- Named for: Château de la Grange-Bléneau
- Seat: LaGrange
- Largest city: LaGrange

Area
  - Total: 386.70 sq mi (1,001.5 km^{2})
  - Land: 379.62 sq mi (983.2 km^{2})
  - Water: 7.08 sq mi (18.3 km^{2}) 1.83%

Population (2020)
  - Total: 40,446
  - Estimate (2025): 41,305 ▲
  - Density: 108.8/sq mi (42.0/km^{2})
- Time zone: UTC−5 (Eastern)
  - Summer (DST): UTC−4 (EDT)
- Congressional district: 3rd
- Website: www.lagrangecounty.org
- Indiana county number 44

LaGrange County is a county located in the U.S. state of Indiana. As of 2020, the population was 40,446. The county seat is LaGrange, Indiana. The county is located in the Northern Indiana region known as Michiana and is about 55 miles (89 km) east of South Bend, 105 miles (169 km) west of Toledo, Ohio, and 175 miles (282 km) northeast of Indianapolis. The area is well known for its large Amish population. For that reason, the county teams up with neighboring Elkhart County to promote tourism by referring to the area as Northern Indiana Amish Country. About half of LaGrange County is Amish, and it is home to the third-largest Amish community in the United States, which belongs to the Elkhart-LaGrange Amish affiliation.

== History ==
The first settlement of LaGrange County was founded about a half mile west of Lima in 1828. Over the next four years, settlers flocked to parts of Lima, Springfield, and Van Buren Townships. Finally in 1832, LaGrange County was carved out of neighboring Elkhart County and established with Lima as the county seat. The town of LaGrange was platted in 1836 and settled in 1842 as the new county seat, closer to the center of the county. Lima's name was changed to Howe in 1909. LaGrange was laid out and platted in 1836.

LaGrange County's initial settlers were Yankee immigrants, that is to say, they were from New England. They were descended from the English Puritans who settled that region in the colonial era. They were part of a wave of New England settlers moving west into what was then the Northwest Territory after the completion of the Erie Canal. The original settlers in LaGrange County specifically hailed from the Massachusetts counties of Worcester County, Suffolk County and Berkshire County; the Connecticut counties of Hartford County and Windham County as well as the Connecticut towns of Sherman, Lebanon and Fairfield; and from the Vermont towns of Burlington, Brookfield, Huntington and Grand Isle. They were mainly members of the Congregational Church, but as a result of the Second Great Awakening, many became Baptists and many also converted to Pentecostalism and Methodism. When they arrived in LaGrange County, there was nothing but a virgin forest and wild prairie. The New England settlers cleared roads, built farms, constructed churches, erected government buildings, and established post routes. As a result of this migration, LaGrange County was culturally continuous with early New England culture for many years.

In 1837, the government removed Chief Shipshewana and the Potawatomi Tribe from the county's northwest corner. Several years later, the Chief was allowed to return and died in Newbury Township in 1841. A town named Georgetown had been platted in 1837 but was abandoned because of lack of development. In 1844, the first Amish came from Pennsylvania to settle around the old town. The village continued to grow, and the town of Shipshewana was platted nearby in 1899 and incorporated in 1916 in Newbury Township.

LaGrange County was named after the Château de la Grange-Bléneau, home of Revolutionary War hero, the Marquis de la Fayette, outside of Paris, France.

== Geography ==
According to the 2010 census, the county has a total area of 386.70 square miles (1,001.5 km^{2}), of which 379.62 square miles (983.2 km^{2}) (or 98.17%) is land and 7.08 square miles (18.3 km^{2}) (or 1.83%) is water.

The county is mostly made up of rural farmland but also some rolling hills and several lakes.

=== Adjacent counties ===
- St. Joseph County, Michigan (northwest)
- Branch County, Michigan (northeast)
- Steuben County (east)
- Noble County (south)
- Elkhart County (west)

=== Major highways ===
- I-80 / I-90 / Indiana Toll Road

== Climate and weather ==
LaGrange, Indiana

Climate chart (precipitation, max. and min. temperature)
J	F	M	A	M	J	J	A	S	O	N	D
1.8 29 14	1.8 34 16	2.7 45 25	3.3 57 36	3.6 69 47	4.2 79 57	3.6 82 61	4 80 59	3.5 73 51	2.8 61 40	2.9 47 31	2.6 34 20
- █ Average max. and min. temperatures in °F
- █ Precipitation totals in inches
- Source: The Weather Channel
Metric conversion
J	F	M	A	M	J	J	A	S	O	N	D
45 −2 −10	45 1 −9	68 7 −4	85 14 2	92 21 8	106 26 14	91 28 16	102 27 15	88 23 11	71 16 4	73 8 −1	66 1 −7
- █ Average max. and min. temperatures in °C
- █ Precipitation totals in mm

In recent years, average temperatures in LaGrange have ranged from a low of 14 °F (−10 °C) in January to a high of 82 °F (28 °C) in July, although a record low of −28 °F (−33 °C) was recorded in December 2000 and a record high of 104 °F (40 °C) was recorded in June 1988. Average monthly precipitation ranged from 1.76 inches (45 mm) in February to 4.17 inches (106 mm) in June.

== Demographics ==
Historical population
Census	Pop.	Note	%±
1840	3,664		—
1850	8,387		128.9%
1860	11,366		35.5%
1870	14,148		24.5%
1880	15,630		10.5%
1890	15,615		−0.1%
1900	15,284		−2.1%
1910	15,148		−0.9%
1920	14,009		−7.5%
1930	13,780		−1.6%
1940	14,352		4.2%
1950	15,347		6.9%
1960	17,380		13.2%
1970	20,890		20.2%
1980	25,550		22.3%
1990	29,477		15.4%
2000	34,909		18.4%
2010	37,128		6.4%
2020	40,446		8.9%
2025 (est.)	41,305	▲	2.1%
U.S. Decennial Census:

=== Racial and ethnic composition ===
LaGrange County, Indiana – Racial and ethnic composition Note: the US Census treats Hispanic/Latino as an ethnic category. This table excludes Latinos from the racial categories and assigns them to a separate category. Hispanics/Latinos may be of any race.
Race / Ethnicity (NH = Non-Hispanic)	Pop 1980	Pop 1990	Pop 2000	Pop 2010	Pop 2020	% 1980	% 1990	% 2000	% 2010	% 2020
White alone (NH)	25,313	28,931	33,405	35,290	37,834	99.07%	98.15%	95.69%	95.05%	93.54%
Black or African American alone (NH)	3	37	61	109	92	0.01%	0.13%	0.17%	0.29%	0.23%
Native American or Alaska Native alone (NH)	33	56	37	65	50	0.13%	0.19%	0.11%	0.18%	0.12%
Asian alone (NH)	40	87	84	118	74	0.16%	0.30%	0.24%	0.32%	0.18%
Native Hawaiian or Pacific Islander alone (NH)	x	x	0	1	1	x	x	0.00%	0.00%	0.00%
Other race alone (NH)	12	4	12	8	33	0.05%	0.01%	0.03%	0.02%	0.08%
Mixed race or Multiracial (NH)	x	x	213	220	629	x	x	0.61%	0.59%	1.56%
Hispanic or Latino (any race)	149	362	1,097	1,317	1,733	0.58%	1.23%	3.14%	3.55%	4.28%
Total	25,550	29,477	34,909	37,128	40,446	100.00%	100.00%	100.00%	100.00%	100.00%

=== 2020 census ===
As of the 2020 census, the county had a population of 40,446. The median age was 30.8 years. 33.2% of residents were under the age of 18 and 14.0% of residents were 65 years of age or older. For every 100 females there were 102.2 males, and for every 100 females age 18 and over there were 99.8 males age 18 and over.

The racial makeup of the county was 94.6% White, 0.2% Black or African American, 0.2% American Indian and Alaska Native, 0.2% Asian, <0.1% Native Hawaiian and Pacific Islander, 1.7% from some other race, and 3.0% from two or more races. Hispanic or Latino residents of any race comprised 4.3% of the population.

<0.1% of residents lived in urban areas, while 100.0% lived in rural areas.

There were 12,676 households in the county, of which 38.5% had children under the age of 18 living in them. Of all households, 65.7% were married-couple households, 13.1% were households with a male householder and no spouse or partner present, and 16.2% were households with a female householder and no spouse or partner present. About 19.6% of all households were made up of individuals and 9.4% had someone living alone who was 65 years of age or older.

There were 14,845 housing units, of which 14.6% were vacant. Among occupied housing units, 82.6% were owner-occupied and 17.4% were renter-occupied. The homeowner vacancy rate was 1.1% and the rental vacancy rate was 7.4%.

=== 2010 census ===
As of the 2010 United States census, there were 37,128 people, 11,598 households, and 9,106 families residing in the county. The population density was 97.8 inhabitants per square mile (37.8/km^{2}). There were 14,094 housing units at an average density of 37.1 per square mile (14.3/km^{2}). The racial makeup of the county was 96.6% white, 0.3% black or African American, 0.3% Asian, 0.2% American Indian, 1.7% from other races, and 0.8% from two or more races. Those of Hispanic or Latino origin made up 3.5% of the population. In terms of ancestry, 36.1% were German, 13.3% were American, 6.4% were Irish, and 6.4% were English.

Of the 11,598 households, 40.2% had children under the age of 18 living with them, 67.6% were married couples living together, 7.1% had a female householder with no husband present, 21.5% were non-families, and 18.4% of all households were made up of individuals. The average household size was 3.17, and the average family size was 3.66. The median age was 30.4 years.

The median income for a household in the county was $47,697 and the median income for a family was $53,793. Males had a median income of $40,960 versus $29,193 for females. The per capita income for the county was $18,388. About 12.1% of families and 16.0% of the population were below the poverty line, including 23.5% of those under age 18 and 16.6% of those age 65 or over.

=== Amish community ===
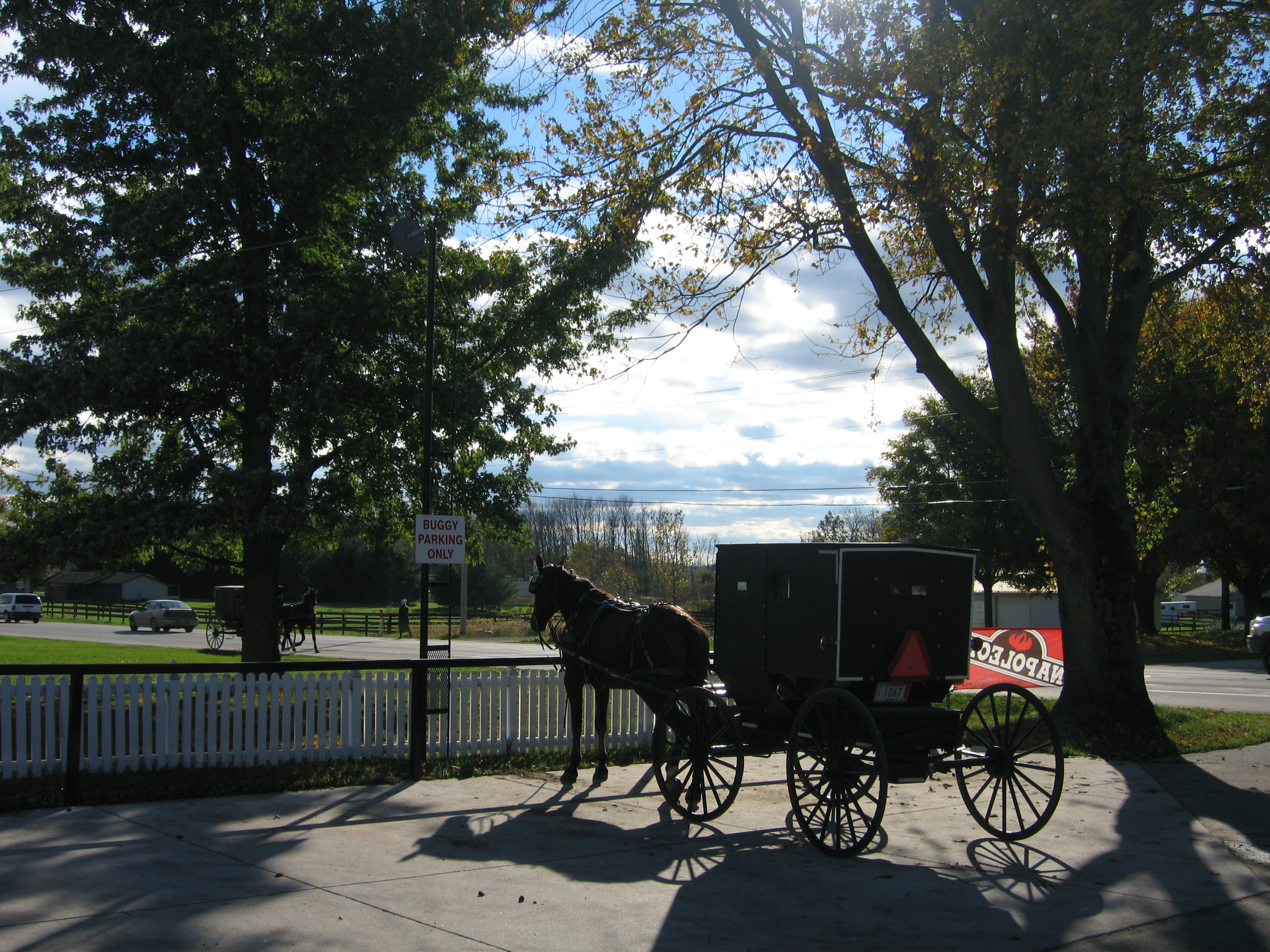
Amish buggy rides are offered in tourist-oriented Shipshewana, Indiana

Approximately 43% of the population of LaGrange County is Amish, as the county is home to the third-largest Amish community in the United States and belongs to the Elkhart-LaGrange Amish affiliation. This is reflected in the linguistic situation in the county: 28.45% of the population report speaking German, Pennsylvania German, or Dutch at home. 68.5% of the total population and 61.29% of the children in 5-17 age group used English as their home language, according to 2000 Census. The Amish languages (German, Pennsylfaansch, and Dutch) were used by 28.47% of the total population and 35.77% of them.

As of 2020 census, Terry Martin, president of the LaGrange County Commissioners, said that "the Amish-English ratio is about 50-50", also adding that the nearly 9% growth, or 3,318 people [between 2010 and 2020 censuses], was mainly due to the increasing Amish population.

== Religion ==
Religion in LaGrange County, according to ARDA (2020) (Numbers reported at the Tradition level, except that the Mennonite/Amish Family has been singled out within the Evangelical Protestant Tradition).
1. Anabaptist Churches (Amish) (44.7%)
2. Evangelical Churches (7.80%)
3. Mainline Protestant Churches (5.20%)
4. Catholic Church (2.30%)
5. Black Protestant Churches (0.70%)
6. None* (39.8%)

*"Nones" is an unclear category. It is a heterogenous group of the not religious and intermittently religious. Researchers argue that most of the "Nones" should be considered "unchurched", rather than objectively nonreligious; especially since most "Nones" do hold some religious-spiritual beliefs and a notable amount participate in religious behaviors. For example, 72% of American "Nones" believe in God or a Higher Power.

== Communities ==
=== Towns ===
- LaGrange
- Shipshewana
- Topeka
- Wolcottville (partially in Noble County)

=== Townships ===
- Bloomfield
- Clay
- Clearspring
- Eden
- Greenfield
- Johnson
- Lima
- Milford
- Newbury
- Springfield
- Van Buren

=== Census-designated place ===
- Howe

=== Other unincorporated communities ===
- Brighton
- Brushy Prairie
- Elmira
- Emma
- Gravel Beach
- Greenwood
- Hartzel
- Honeyville
- Indianola
- Lakeside Park
- Lakeview
- Mongo
- Northwood
- Oak Lodge
- Ontario
- Pashan
- Plato
- Ramblewood
- River Oaks
- Scott
- Sha-Get Acres
- Shady Nook
- South Milford
- Star Mill
- Stroh
- Tall Timbers
- Timberhurst
- Twin Lakes
- Valentine
- Webers Landing
- Witmer Manor
- Woodland Hills
- Woodland Park
- Woodruff

== Economy ==
The economy is based mainly on agriculture and small shops, but tourism also plays a big role, especially in Shipshewana.

== Government ==
The county is led by a board of three elected commissioners that serve as the county government's executive branch. The county council comprises 7 elected members – four from each council district and 3 at large. Also, one assessor serves the entire county as opposed to one for every township.

The current county commissioners are:

- North District: Terry Martin
- Middle District: Kevin Myers
- South District: Peter Cook

The current county council members are:

- Charles F. Ashcraft D - District 1
- Ryan Riegsecker R- District 2
- Harold Gingerich R - District 3
- Jim Young R - District 4
- Jeff Brill R - At Large
- Steve McKowen R - At Large
- Mike Strawser R - At Large

LaGrange County is part of Indiana's 3rd congressional district; Indiana Senate district 13; and Indiana House of Representatives districts 18 and 52.

LaGrange County has consistently been a Republican Party stronghold in presidential elections. In only three elections since 1888 has a Republican candidate failed to win the county, most recently in 1964.

United States presidential election results for LaGrange County, Indiana
Year	Republican		Democratic		Third party(ies)	
Year	No.	%	No.	%	No.	%
1888	2,262	57.32%	1,516	38.42%	168	4.26%
1892	2,033	54.59%	1,438	38.61%	253	6.79%
1896	2,442	58.97%	1,665	40.21%	34	0.82%
1900	2,329	59.34%	1,431	36.46%	165	4.20%
1904	2,461	64.61%	1,100	28.88%	248	6.51%
1908	2,357	60.13%	1,414	36.07%	149	3.80%
1912	758	21.58%	1,233	35.11%	1,521	43.31%
1916	1,958	54.09%	1,512	41.77%	150	4.14%
1920	3,852	68.02%	1,687	29.79%	124	2.19%
1924	3,081	63.34%	1,566	32.20%	217	4.46%
1928	3,171	64.40%	1,720	34.93%	33	0.67%
1932	2,461	42.29%	3,261	56.03%	98	1.68%
1936	3,125	51.72%	2,821	46.69%	96	1.59%
1940	3,731	63.43%	2,124	36.11%	27	0.46%
1944	3,501	68.71%	1,539	30.21%	55	1.08%
1948	3,106	63.82%	1,628	33.45%	133	2.73%
1952	3,822	68.80%	1,604	28.87%	129	2.32%
1956	3,815	70.47%	1,562	28.85%	37	0.68%
1960	4,433	69.03%	1,965	30.60%	24	0.37%
1964	2,785	49.38%	2,818	49.96%	37	0.66%
1968	3,328	61.54%	1,691	31.27%	389	7.19%
1972	4,152	71.11%	1,658	28.40%	29	0.50%
1976	3,876	57.24%	2,835	41.86%	61	0.90%
1980	4,259	62.49%	2,095	30.74%	461	6.76%
1984	4,772	71.31%	1,884	28.15%	36	0.54%
1988	4,495	68.67%	2,029	31.00%	22	0.34%
1992	3,584	48.15%	2,093	28.12%	1,767	23.74%
1996	4,033	52.11%	2,704	34.94%	1,003	12.96%
2000	5,437	65.25%	2,733	32.80%	163	1.96%
2004	6,430	71.42%	2,523	28.02%	50	0.56%
2008	5,702	59.80%	3,663	38.42%	170	1.78%
2012	6,231	66.88%	2,898	31.11%	187	2.01%
2016	7,025	72.68%	2,080	21.52%	561	5.80%
2020	8,110	76.14%	2,355	22.11%	187	1.76%
2024	8,073	77.33%	2,162	20.71%	204	1.95%

== Education ==
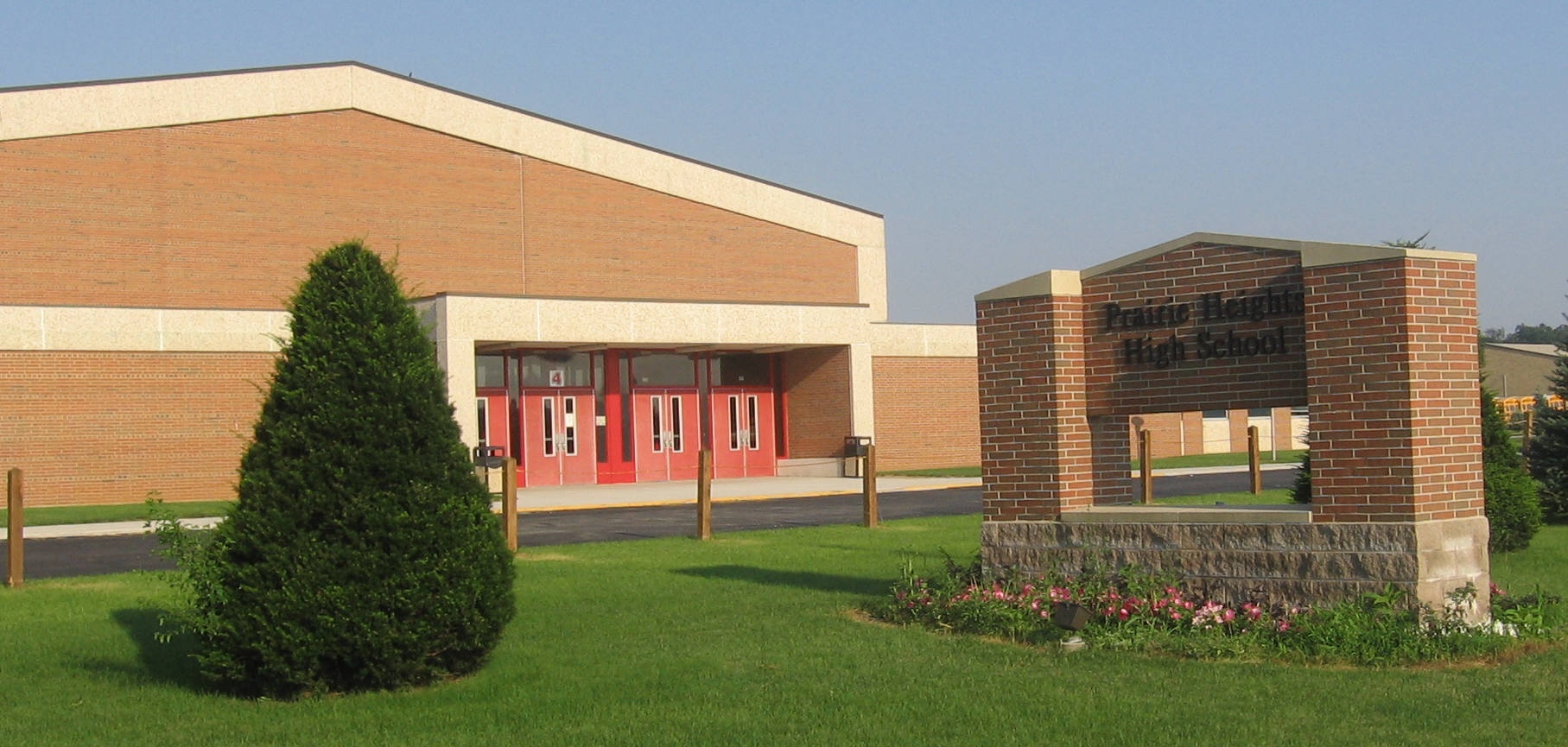
Prairie Heights High School, just off U.S. Route 20 near the Steuben County line.

The county has three public school districts.

=== Public schools ===
The Lakeland School Corporation serve the central part of the county. The system includes Lakeland Primary: Grades (K–2), Lakeland Intermediate: grades (3–6), and Lakeland Jr/Sr High: grades (7–12).

The Prairie Heights School Corporation serves the east side of the county and parts of Steuben County. The mascot of Prairie Heights Senior High School is a black panther.

The Westview School Corporation serves the west portion of the county. This system consists of Meadowview Elementary, Shipshewana-Scott Elementary, Topeka Elementary (all K–4); Westview Elementary (5–6); and Westview Junior-Senior High School (7–12).

=== Private schools ===
Several Amish schools are located across the county.

=== Public library ===
LaGrange County is served by the LaGrange County Public Library, with branches in LaGrange, Shipshewana, and Topeka.

== See also ==
- List of counties in Indiana
- List of counties in Michigan
- Michiana
- National Register of Historic Places listings in LaGrange County, Indiana
- The News Sun, the daily newspaper covering LaGrange County
