= Eden Township, LaGrange County, Indiana =

Eden Township
- Township
- Coordinates: 41°34′13″N 85°35′35″W
- Country: United States
- State: Indiana
- County: LaGrange

Government
  - Type: Indiana township

Area
  - Total: 35.95 sq mi (93.1 km^{2})
  - Land: 35.88 sq mi (92.9 km^{2})
  - Water: 0.07 sq mi (0.18 km^{2})
- Elevation: 920 ft (280 m)

Population (2020)
  - Total: 4,894
  - Density: 136.4/sq mi (52.66/km^{2})
- FIPS code: 18-20206
- GNIS feature ID: 453271

Eden Township is one of eleven townships in LaGrange County, Indiana. As of the 2020 census, its population was 4,894, up from 4,231 at the 2010 census, when it also contained 1,085 housing units. The township has a large Amish and Mennonite population.

According to the 2019 "ACS 5-Year Estimates Data Profiles", 18% of the township's population spoke only English, while 79 spoke an "other [than Spanish] Indo-European language" (basically Pennsylvania German/German).

Eden Township was organized in 1832.

== Geography ==
According to the 2010 census, the township has a total area of 35.95 square miles (93.1 km^{2}), of which 35.88 square miles (92.9 km^{2}) (or 99.81%) is land and 0.07 square miles (0.18 km^{2}) (or 0.19%) is water.

== Demographics ==
Historical population
Census	Pop.	Note	%±
1920	1,315		—
1930	1,319		0.3%
1940	1,448		9.8%
1950	1,494		3.2%
1960	1,584		6.0%
1970	1,794		13.3%
1980	2,067		15.2%
1990	2,510		21.4%
2000	3,422		36.3%
2010	4,231		23.6%
2020	4,894		15.7%
2024 (est.)	5,006		2.3%
U.S. Decennial Census:
