= Newbury Township, LaGrange County, Indiana =

Newbury Township
- Township
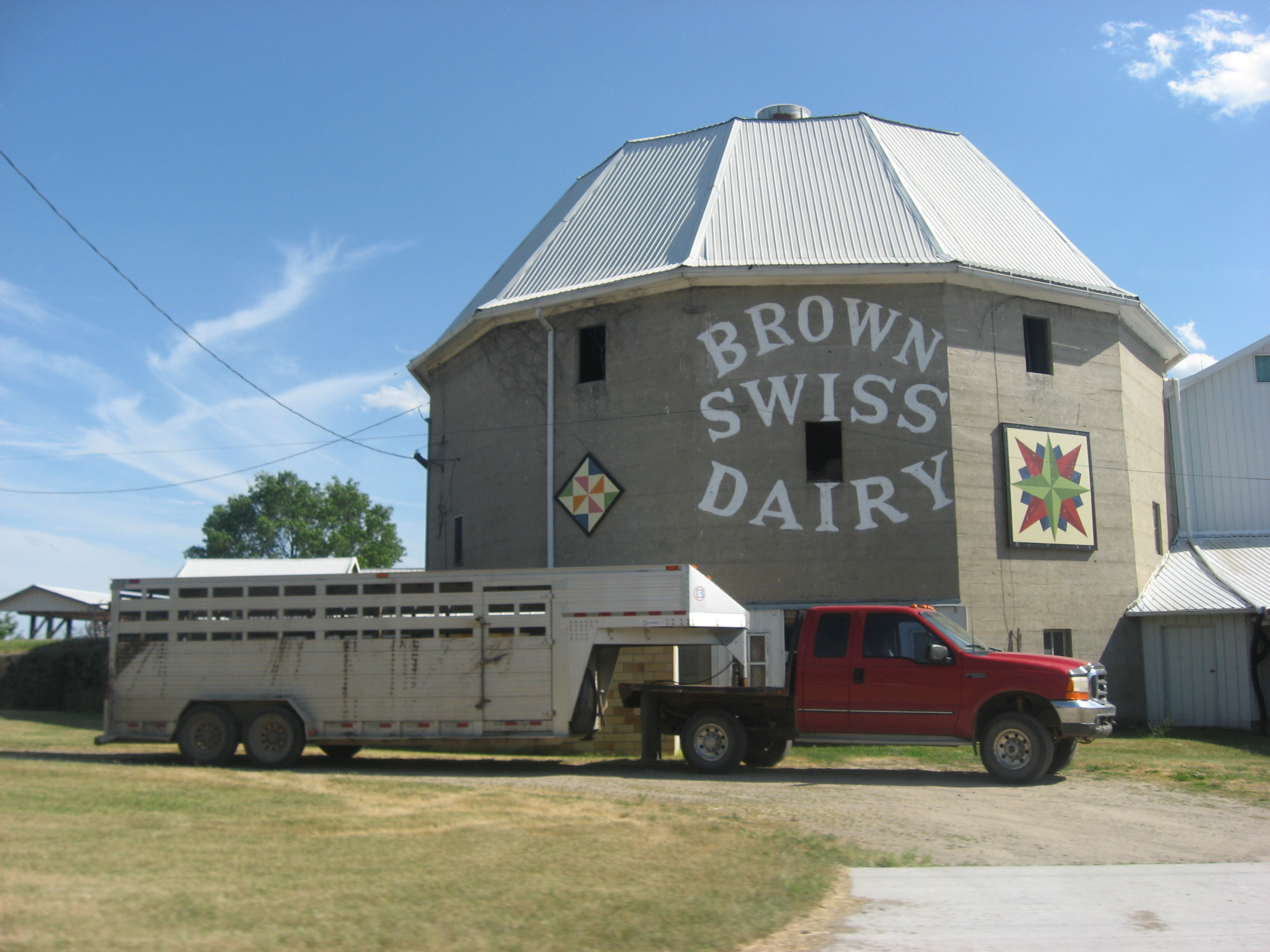
- The Menno Yoder Polygonal Barn, a historic site in the township

- Coordinates: 41°39′03″N 85°35′41″W
- Country: United States
- State: Indiana
- County: LaGrange

Government
  - Type: Indiana township

Area
  - Total: 35.78 sq mi (92.7 km^{2})
  - Land: 35.26 sq mi (91.3 km^{2})
  - Water: 0.52 sq mi (1.3 km^{2})
- Elevation: 896 ft (273 m)

Population (2020)
  - Total: 5,792
  - Density: 164.3/sq mi (63.42/km^{2})
- FIPS code: 18-52686
- GNIS feature ID: 453661

Newbury Township is one of 11 townships in LaGrange County, Indiana. As of the 2020 census, its population was 5,792, up from 5,219 at the previous census.

According to the 2020 "ACS 5-Year Estimates Data Profiles", 36.5% of the township's population spoke only English, while 63.4% spoke an "other [than Spanish] Indo-European language" (basically Pennsylvania German/German).

== History ==
Newbury Township was organized in 1837.

The Menno Yoder Polygonal Barn was listed on the National Register of Historic Places in 1993.

== Geography ==
According to the 2010 census, the township has a total area of 35.78 square miles (92.7 km^{2}), of which 0.52 sq mi (1.3 km^{2}) (or 1.45%) is covered by water.

== Demographics ==
Historical population
Census	Pop.	Note	%±
1920	1,430		—
1930	1,452		1.5%
1940	1,548		6.6%
1950	1,629		5.2%
1960	2,014		23.6%
1970	2,467		22.5%
1980	3,168		28.4%
1990	3,850		21.5%
2000	4,416		14.7%
2010	5,217		18.1%
2020	5,792		11.0%
2024 (est.)	5,929		2.4%
U.S. Censuses:
