= Johnson Township, LaGrange County, Indiana =

Johnson Township
- Township
- Coordinates: 41°34′23″N 85°22′10″W
- Country: United States
- State: Indiana
- County: LaGrange

Government
  - Type: Indiana township

Area
  - Total: 35.63 sq mi (92.3 km^{2})
  - Land: 33.27 sq mi (86.2 km^{2})
  - Water: 2.36 sq mi (6.1 km^{2})
- Elevation: 958 ft (292 m)

Population (2020)
  - Total: 3,546
  - Density: 102/sq mi (39/km^{2})
- FIPS code: 18-38718
- GNIS feature ID: 453514

Historical population
Census	Pop.	Note	%±
1930	1,184		—
1940	1,166		−1.5%
1950	1,234		5.8%
1960	1,510		22.4%
1970	2,025		34.1%
1980	2,593		28.0%
1990	2,880		11.1%
2000	3,304		14.7%
2010	3,392		2.7%
2020	3,546		4.5%
U.S. Census:

Johnson Township is one of eleven townships in LaGrange County, Indiana. As of the 2020 census, its population was 3,546 (up from 3,392 at 2010) and it contained 2,076 housing units.

Johnson Township was founded in 1837.

== Geography ==
According to the 2010 census, the township has a total area of 35.63 square miles (92.3 km^{2}), of which 33.27 square miles (86.2 km^{2}) (or 93.38%) is land and 2.36 square miles (6.1 km^{2}) (or 6.62%) is water.
