= George Y. Bliss =

American cleric (1864–1924)

The Right Reverend George Yemens Bliss
- Coadjutor Bishop of Vermont
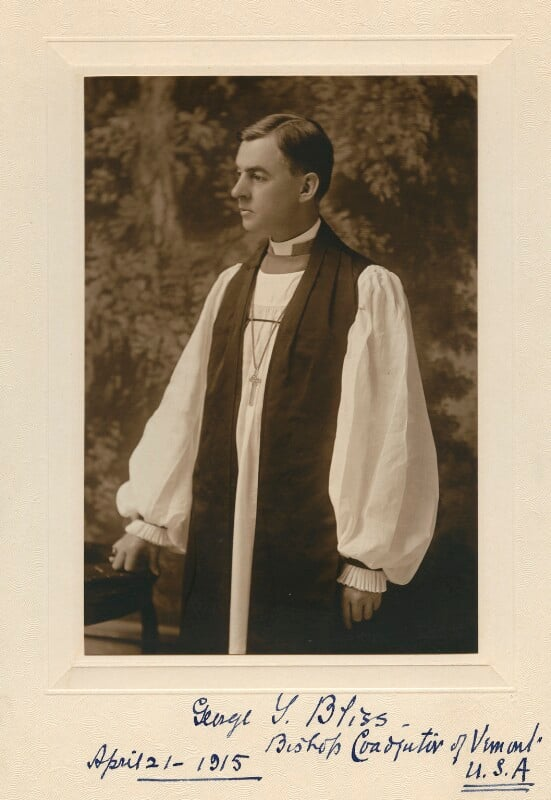
- Bliss in 1915
- Church: Episcopal Church
- Diocese: Vermont
- Elected: January 12, 1915
- In office: 1915–1924
- Predecessor: William Farrar Weeks
- Successor: Samuel B. Booth

Orders
- Ordination: 1893 by Henry A. Neely
- Consecration: April 21, 1915 by Arthur C. A. Hall

Personal details
- Born: March 12, 1864 Shelburne, Vermont, United States
- Died: July 10, 1924 (aged 60) Burlington, Vermont, United States
- Buried: Lakeview Cemetery (Burlington, Vermont)
- Denomination: Anglican
- Parents: George Bliss & Mary Adelaide Stevens
- Spouse: Katherine Lucinda Shattuck
- Children: 3
- Education: University of Vermont

George Yemens Bliss (March 12, 1864 – July 10, 1924) was an American cleric who was the coadjutor bishop of the Episcopal Diocese of Vermont, serving from 1915 until his death in 1924.

== Early life and education ==
Bliss was born on March 12, 1864, in Shelburne, Vermont, the son of George Bliss and Mary Adelaide Stevens. He studied at the University of Vermont and graduated with a Bachelor of Arts in 1889. The same university awarded him an honorary Doctor of Divinity in 1904. He also graduated with a Bachelor of Sacred Theology from the General Theological Seminary in 1892. He married on November 15, 1893, to Katherine Lucinda Shattuck (1870-1954), and together they had three children.

== Ordained ministry ==
Bliss was ordained deacon on June 12, 1892, by Bishop William Henry Augustus Bissell of Vermont in St Paul's Church. He was then ordained priest in 1893 by Bishop Henry A. Neely of Maine. After ordination to the diaconate, he became curate at St Paul's Church in Burlington, Vermont and in 1899 became rector of the same church. He kept the post till 1915.

== Bishop ==
On January 20, 1915, Bliss was elected Coadjutor Bishop of Vermont. He was consecrated on April 21, 1915, at St Paul's Church in Burlington, Vermont, with the Bishop of Vermont Arthur C. A. Hall as chief consecrator. He died as a coadjutor without ever serving as diocesan on July 10, 1924.
