= Donald MacAdie =

American bishop

The Right Reverend Donald MacAdie D.D., S.T.D.
- Suffragan Bishop of Newark
- Church: Episcopal Church
- Diocese: Newark
- Elected: April 29, 1958
- In office: 1958–1963
- Predecessor: Theodore R. Ludlow
- Successor: George Rath

Orders
- Ordination: March 1925 by Edwin Stevens Lines
- Consecration: October 22, 1958 by Benjamin M. Washburn; Co-Conscrators - Arthur C. Lichtenberger and Leland Stark

Personal details
- Born: December 5, 1899 Bayonne, New Jersey, United States
- Died: August 1, 1963 (aged 63) Passaic, New Jersey, United States
- Denomination: Anglican
- Parents: John MacAdie & Ella Jordan
- Spouse: Ruth A. Comer (m. 1922, d. 1951); Helen L. Myer (m. 1953)
- Children: 1 (John)
- Education: Kenyon College; General Theological Seminary

Donald MacAdie (December 5, 1899 – August 1, 1963) was a suffragan bishop of the Episcopal Diocese of Newark, serving from 1958 to 1963.

== Biography ==
MacAdie was born in Bayonne, New Jersey, in 1899 and his mother's name was Ella. He attended Kenyon College where he was a member of Sigma Pi fraternity. While at Kenyon he was drafted into the Student Army Training Corps during World War I and attended Officers Training School at Camp Grant, IL. After being discharged at the end of the war, he graduated from Kenyon in 1922 then attended Bexley Hall before transferring to General Theological Seminary where he graduated in 1924. He would later attain a Doctorate of Sacred Theology (STD) from General Theological Seminary in 1958.

He was ordained in 1925. Before his ordination, he was involved in youth work at St. Thomas' Church in New York City. His first assignment was as rector of St. Mary's Church in Haledon, New Jersey, where he stayed until 1929. From 1929 to 1931 he was the executive secretary of the diocese's social service and field department. From 1931 to 1958 he was the rector of St. John's Church in Passaic, New Jersey.

In 1958 he was named Suffragan Bishop of Newark and received an honorary Doctorate of Divinity from Kenyon. He was presented to his consecration by Bishops Frederick J. Warnecke and James P. deWolfe. His duties included oversight of the churches in Bergen, Passaic, Warren, and Sussex counties. He also was in charge of the diocese's promotion, education, youth, urban work, social work, and laymen's work organizations.

He was married twice, first to Ruth Ansel Comer MacAdie (1897-1951, with whom he had a son, John) and then Helen Myer MacAdie (1906-1989).

He died in Passaic, New Jersey, at the Passaic General Hospital, of an intestinal lesion and a heart ailment.
