= William Farrar Weeks =

American coadjutor bishop

The Right Reverend William Farrar Weeks D.D.
- Coadjutor Bishop of Vermont
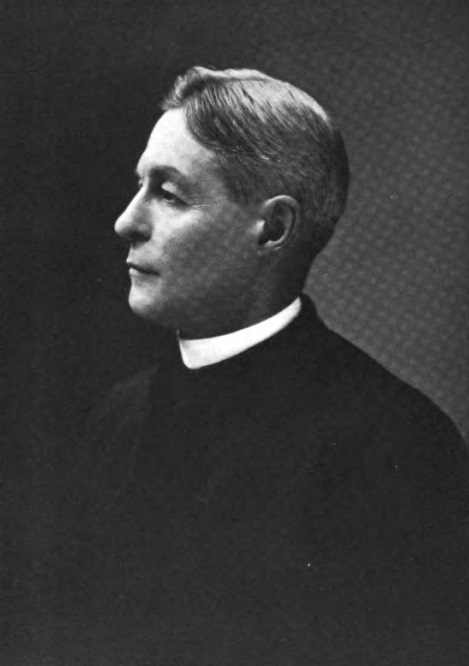
- Church: Episcopal Church
- Diocese: Vermont
- Elected: November 13, 1912
- In office: 1913–1914
- Successor: George Y. Bliss

Orders
- Ordination: September 25, 1885 by William Henry Augustus Bissell
- Consecration: January 29, 1913 by Arthur C. A. Hall

Personal details
- Born: February 22, 1859 St. Albans, Vermont, United States
- Died: October 23, 1914 (aged 55) Rutland, Vermont, United States
- Denomination: Anglican
- Parents: Joseph Seelye Weeks & Mary Elizabeth Farrar
- Spouse: Mary DeForest Wead (1866-1945)
- Children: 4
- Education: Williams College

William Farrar Weeks (February 22, 1859 - October 23, 1914) was coadjutor bishop of the Episcopal Diocese of Vermont from 1913 till 1914.

== Early life and education ==
Weeks was born on February 22, 1859, in St. Albans, Vermont, the son of Joseph Seelye Weeks (1829-1888) and Mary Elizabeth Farrar (1838-1916). He was educated at St. Albans High School and graduated in 1877. He later studied at Williams College, from which he graduated with a Bachelor of Arts in 1881. He enrolled at the General Theological Seminary, and graduated in 1884.

== Ordained ministry ==
Weeks was ordained deacon at St. Albans in October 1884, and then priest on September 29, 1885, in St Matthew's Church, Enosburg Falls, Vermont, by Bishop William Henry Augustus Bissell of Vermont. After ordination he became rector of St Matthew's, the church in which he was ordained priest, and in 1889, became rector of St Thomas' Church in Brandon, Vermont. In 1894, he left for Shelburne, Vermont, to serve as rector of Trinity Church.

== Bishop ==
On November 13, 1912, Weeks was elected Coadjutor Bishop of Vermont and was consecrated on January 29, 1913, at Burlington by Bishop Arthur C. A. Hall of Vermont. He died the following year on October 23 as a result of a prolonged illness of several months.
