= Harvey Butterfield =

American bishop

The Right Reverend Harvey Dean Butterfield S.T.D.
- Bishop of Vermont
- Church: Episcopal Church
- Diocese: Vermont
- Elected: November 3, 1960
- In office: 1961–1973
- Predecessor: Vedder Van Dyck
- Successor: Robert S. Kerr

Orders
- Ordination: February 1935 by Francis M. Taitt
- Consecration: February 8, 1961 by Arthur C. Lichtenberger

Personal details
- Born: March 13, 1908 North Troy, Vermont, United States
- Died: August 10, 1998 (aged 90) Burlington, Vermont, United States
- Buried: Rock Point Cemetery
- Denomination: American
- Parents: Hugh Harvey Butterfield & Evangeline Gladys Barrows
- Spouse: Carolyn Whitney
- Children: 2

Harvey Dean Butterfield (March 13, 1908 – August 10, 1998) was sixth bishop of the Episcopal Diocese of Vermont from 1961 to 1974.

== Education ==
Butterfield was born on March 13, 1908, in North Troy, Vermont, the son of Hugh Harvey Butterfield and Evangeline Gladys Barrows. He attended high school in Burlington. In 1931 he graduated from the University of Vermont and later enrolled as a student at the General Theological Seminary from where he graduated with a Bachelor of Sacred Theology in 1934.

== Ordination ==
Butterfield was ordained deacon on May 27, 1934, by Bishop Samuel B. Booth and served his diaconate as deacon in charge of St. Mary's Church in Carle Place, New York. After ordination to the priesthood in February 1935 by Bishop Francis M. Taitt, he became assistant of the Church of the Good Shepherd (Rosemont, Pennsylvania). From 1936 till 1941 he served as rector of Christ Church in Media, Pennsylvania, after which he became rector of St. Luke's Church in Germantown, Philadelphia. In 1943 he was appointed rector of Trinity Church in Rutland, Vermont, a post he held till 1956. Between 1950 and 1952 he was a chaplain in the US Army during the Korean War. Between 1956 and 1958 he served as director of Education in the Diocese of Vermont. In 1958 he became rector of St. Paul's Church in Burlington, Vermont. He served as a diocesan deputy to the General Convention, notably in 1943, 1946, 1949 and 1955.

== Bishop ==
On November 3, 1960, Butterfield was elected Bishop of Vermont on the seventh ballot of the special convention which took place in Trinity Church in Rutland, Vermont. He was consecrated bishop on February 8, 1961, by Presiding Bishop Arthur C. Lichtenberger. During his time as bishop he was involved in the Civil Rights Movement and was a critic of some political decisions. Butterfield was also a supporter of the ordination of women to the priesthood and was the first Bishop of Vermont to ordain women in Vermont. He retired in 1973 and spent six months as a missionary in El Salvador. He died on August 10, 1998.

== Personal life ==
Butterfield married Carolyn Whitney in 1934 and had two children, Harvey Whitney and Deborah.
