= Order of Saint Helena =

Religious congregation of women in the Episcopal Church

- Order of Saint Helena
- Named after: St. Helena
- Formation: 1945
- Location: North Augusta, SC, United States
- Website: https://www.osh.org/

The Order of Saint Helena is an Episcopal monastic community for women in the Episcopal Church, founded in the 20th century. It emphasizes a life of prayer, hospitality, and service, and is known for its commitment to inclusive language, including the publishing of the Saint Helena Psalter

== History ==
The Order of St. Helena was established in 1945 in Versailles, Kentucky, as a religious community for women within the Episcopal Church. It was formed by nine sisters who felt called to separate from the autonomous Order of St. Anne, which at the time operated Margaret Hall School for girls. The sisters received guidance and support from monks of The Order of the Holy Cross, who served as their superiors for three decades.

By 1953, the order had expanded enough to acquire 50 acres in the Hudson River Valley, New York, where they founded their largest convent in Vails Gate. In 1961, they opened a second convent in Augusta, Georgia, followed by a third in Manhattan in 1975. Over the course of 55 years, the sisters have engaged in ministries extending beyond these locations, reaching communities in Seattle, Liberia, the Bahamas, and Ghana.

In 2008, the order closed its convent in Vails Gate, making the North Augusta convent the only one remaining.

== Vows, life, and core values ==
The sisters live under vows or poverty, chastity and obedience.

Their core values consist of prayer, hospitality, service, and tradition and innovation.

The order is connected to the Episcopal Church by their visiting bishop, who is currently The Rt. Rev. Carlye Hughes, XI Bishop of the Diocese of Newark.

== Publications ==
=== By individual sisters ===
- Stephen, Ellen, OSH. The L Dimension: a World to Free. Asheville, TN: United Writers Press, 2024. ISBN 978-1-961813-45-8. Available from Amazon.com.
- Ampah, Rosina, OSH. The Reason Why Crows in African Countries Have White Color. Houston, TX: Saint Julian Press, Inc., 2022. ISBN 978-1-955194-10-5. Available from Amazon.com and Barnes & Noble.
- Benedicta, OSH. Pinpoints of Light. North Augusta, SC: Order of Saint Helena, 2020. ISBN 979-8693747166. Available from Amazon.com.
- Stephen, Ellen, OSH. You Really Want to Know? A Spiritual Love Story. ISBN 978-1720769323. Available from Amazon.com.
- Stephen, Ellen, OSH. The Poet's Eye: Collected Poetry. Palo Alto, CA: Academica Press, 2012. ISBN 978-1-936320-51-6. Available from Amazon.com.
- Stephen, Ellen, OSH. Some Antics. The Order of Saint Helena, 2012.
- Ampah, Rosina, OSH. The Beautiful Cloth: Stories & Proverbs of Ghana. Cambridge, MA: Yellow Moon Press, 2010. ISBN 978-0-938756-76-7. Available from Amazon.com. Received a "Storytelling World Honor" in 2013.
- Stephen, Ellen, OSH. Together and Apart: A Memoir of the Religious Life. New York, NY: Church Publishing, 2008. ISBN 978-0-8192-2315-9. Available from Amazon.com.
- Stephen, Ellen, OSH, and Doug Shadel. Vessel of Peace: A Guide for Pilgrims of the Spirit. Nashville, TN: Abingdon Press, 2007. ISBN 978-0-687-64255-7. Available from Amazon.com.
- Pemberton, Cintra. Soulfaring: Celtic Pilgrimages Then and Now. Harrisburg, PA: Morehouse Publishing, 1999. ISBN 978-0-8192-1780-6. Available from Amazon.com.

=== As a congregation ===
- The Order of Saint Helena. The Saint Helena Breviary: Personal Edition. New York, NY: Church Publishing, 2019. ISBN 978-1640652750 (hardcover).
- The Order of Saint Helena. The Saint Helena Psalter: A New Version of the Psalms in Expansive Language. New York, NY: Church Publishing, 2018. ISBN 978-1640652057 (paperback).
