= John Croneberger =

The Right Reverend John Palmer Croneberger
- Bishop of Newark
- Church: Episcopal Church
- Diocese: Newark
- In office: 2000–2007
- Predecessor: John Shelby Spong
- Successor: Mark M. Beckwith
- Previous post: Coadjutor Bishop of Newark (1998-2000)

Orders
- Ordination: March 6, 1964 by Frederick J. Warnecke
- Consecration: November 21, 1998 by Arthur Benjamin Williams, Jr.

Personal details
- Born: August 25, 1938 Pottsville, Pennsylvania
- Died: February 23, 2023 (aged 84) Leesport, Pennsylvania
- Denomination: Anglican

John Palmer Croneberger (August 25, 1938 – February 23, 2023) was an American clergyman of the Episcopal Church in the United States of America. He served as the ninth bishop of the Diocese of Newark (based in Newark, New Jersey).

== Biography ==
Croneberger was serving as rector at the Church of the Atonement in Tenafly, New Jersey, in June 1998 when he was elected as Bishop of Newark. He was consecrated as Bishop Coadjutor on November 21 of the same year. Croneberger succeeded Bishop John Shelby Spong on February 26, 2000, in an installation ceremony at Trinity & St. Philip's Cathedral, Newark.

As diocesan bishop, he continued Spong's agenda of radical inclusion. On accepting LGBTQ inclusion in the Episcopal Church, Croneberger said:

"Supporting" inclusion "may be more important than unity within the worldwide Anglican communion."

On April 6, 2005, he announced his intention to retire in January 2007, citing the health of his wife, Marilyn.

The diocese held a special convention to elect his successor on September 23, 2006. Mark Beckwith, the rector of All Saints' Episcopal Church in Worcester, Massachusetts, was elected on the third ballot.

Croneberger also served as an Assistant Bishop of the Diocese of Bethlehem.

John Croneberger died in Leesport, Pennsylvania, on February 23, 2023, at the age of 84.
