= Robert S. Kerr (bishop) =

American Episcopal bishop

The Right Reverend Robert Shaw Kerr D.D., S.T.D.
- Bishop of Vermont
- Church: Episcopal Church
- Diocese: Vermont
- In office: 1974–1986
- Predecessor: Harvey Butterfield
- Successor: Daniel L. Swenson
- Previous post: Coadjutor Bishop of Vermont (1974)

Orders
- Ordination: September 29, 1943 by James De Wolf Perry
- Consecration: March 16, 1974 by John E. Hines

Personal details
- Born: August 16, 1917 Newport, Rhode Island, United States
- Died: November 18, 1988 (aged 71) Burlington, Vermont, United States
- Buried: Rock Point Cemetery
- Denomination: American
- Parents: Edgar John Kerr & Amelia Shaw
- Spouse: Carolyn Brooks Hill
- Children: 2

Robert Shaw Kerr (August 16, 1917 - November 18, 1988) was seventh bishop of the Episcopal Diocese of Vermont, serving from 1974 to 1986.

== Biography ==
Kerr studied at Trinity College in Connecticut and graduated with a Bachelor of Arts in 1940. Later he trained at the General Theological Seminary. Upon graduation in 1943, he was made deacon on February 28, 1943, by Bishop James De Wolf Perry of Rhode Island in Trinity Church, Newport, Rhode Island. He was ordained priest on September 29 of the same year. Kerr served as assistant at Cathedral of St John the Divine in New York City. He also served as rector of St John's Church in Barre, Vermont. In 1949 he became rector of Immanuel Church in Bellows Falls, Vermont. He also served as Dean of St Paul's Cathedral in Burlington, Vermont. In 1973, Kerr was elected Coadjutor Bishop of Vermont and was consecrated on March 16, 1974. After three months, on June 12, 1974, he succeeded as diocesan. He retired in 1986 and died in Burlington of a heart attack on November 18, 1988.
