= Vedder Van Dyck =

American bishop

The Right Reverend Vedder Van Dyck D.D., S.T.D.
- Bishop of Vermont
- Church: Episcopal Church
- Diocese: Vermont
- Elected: November 12, 1935
- In office: 1936–1960
- Predecessor: Samuel B. Booth
- Successor: Harvey Butterfield

Orders
- Ordination: 1915 by Edwin Stevens Lines
- Consecration: February 24, 1936 by James De Wolf Perry

Personal details
- Born: July 18, 1889 Bayonne, New Jersey, United States
- Died: August 2, 1960 (aged 71) Burlington, Vermont, United States
- Buried: Rock Point Cemetery, Burlington
- Denomination: Anglican
- Parents: Vedder Van Dyck & Emily Adams
- Spouse: May Estelle Ketcham
- Children: 1
- Education: Columbia College

Vedder Van Dyck (July 18, 1889 - August 2, 1960) was the fifth bishop of the Episcopal Diocese of Vermont.

== Biography ==
His parents were Vedder Van Dyck (1842-1904) and Emily Adams (1847-1923). A graduate of Columbia College (1918) and the General Theological Seminary in New York (1914), he was consecrated on February 24, 1936. His consecrators were James DeWolf Perry, Henry Knox Sherrill and John T. Dallas. Prior to this, Van Dyck was served Saint Mary's Church in Amityville, New York, where he was ordained as deacon (April 25, 1914), priest (1915), and priest-in-charge and rector (1917–1929). He died in office on August 2, 1960, and was succeeded by Harvey D. Butterfield.

He was a Freemason under the jurisdiction of the Grand Lodge of New York.
