= Lloyd E. Gressle =

American Anglican bishop

The Right Reverend Lloyd Edward Gressle D.D., D.H.L.
- Bishop of Bethlehem
- Church: Episcopal Church
- Diocese: Bethlehem
- In office: 1971–1983
- Predecessor: Frederick J. Warnecke
- Successor: Mark Dyer
- Previous post: Coadjutor Bishop of Bethlehem (1970-1971)

Orders
- Ordination: September 1943 by Beverley Dandridge Tucker
- Consecration: September 26, 1970 by John E. Hines

Personal details
- Born: June 13, 1918 Cleveland, Ohio, United States
- Died: December 7, 1999 (aged 81) East Quogue, New York, United States
- Denomination: Anglican
- Parents: Edward William Gressle & Olga I. Hoppensack
- Spouse: Marguerite Louise Kirkpatrick
- Children: 3
- Education: Oberlin College

Lloyd Edward Gressle (June 13, 1918 – December 7, 1999) was an American Anglican bishop who served as the Bishop of Bethlehem from 1971 to 1983.

== Education ==
Gressle was born on June 13, 1918, in Cleveland, Ohio, the son of Edward William Gressle and Olga I. Hoppensack. He was educated at Oberlin College from where he earned his Bachelor of Arts in 1940. He then studied in Bexley Hall from where he graduated with a Bachelor of Divinity in 1943. He was awarded a Doctor of Divinity in 1958 from Kenyon College and a Doctor of Humane Letters in 1981 from Lehigh University.

== Ordained ministry ==
Gressle was ordained deacon on March 27, 1943, in Christ Church, Shaker Heights, Ohio, by Bishop Beverley Dandridge Tucker of Ohio and priest that September by the same bishop. That same year, on July 12, he married Marguerite Louise Kirkpatrick, with whom he had three children. Between 1943 and 1948, he served as rector of St James' Church in Wooster, Ohio, and in 1948 he became rector of St John's Church in Sharon, Pennsylvania. Between 1956 and 1969 he was the Dean of the Cathedral St John in Wilmington, Delaware, and in 1969 he became rector of St James' Church in Lancaster, Pennsylvania.

== Bishop ==
Gressle was elected Coadjutor Bishop of Bethlehem in 1970 and was consecrated by Presiding Bishop John E. Hines on September 26, 1970, at the Packer Memorial Chapel of Lehigh University. He was enthroned as sixth bishop of Bethlehem on December 4, 1971, and gained responsibility of the diocese on January 1, 1972. He was a member of the Executive Council of the Episcopal Church and was a trustee of St. Luke's Hospital, Bethlehem. He retired in December 1983. Between the 1970s and the 2020s, the diocese has been a major epicenter for clerical sexual abuse claims regarding priests, youth leaders, and organists, with multiple thousands of criminal charges against clergy and lay employees, including charges against Gressle ordinands.

Anglican Communion titles
Preceded by Frederick J. Warnecke	Bishop of Bethlehem; 1970–1982	Succeeded by Mark Dyer
