= Episcopal Diocese of Vermont =

Episcopal Church diocese in the US

Coordinates: 44°N 72.7°W

Diocese of Vermont

Location
- Country: United States
- Territory: Vermont
- Ecclesiastical province: Province I

Statistics
- Congregations: 43 (2024)
- Members: 3,759 (2025)

Information
- Denomination: Episcopal Church
- Established: September 20, 1790
- Cathedral: Cathedral of St Paul

Current leadership
- Bishop: Shannon MacVean-Brown

Map
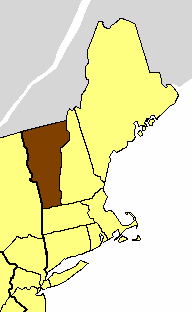
- Location of the Diocese of Vermont

Website
- www.diovermont.org

The Episcopal Diocese of Vermont is the diocese of the Episcopal Church in the United States of America in the state of Vermont. It was the first diocese in the Episcopal Church to elect a woman, Mary Adelia Rosamond McLeod, as diocesan bishop.

The see city is Burlington, where the Cathedral Church of St. Paul is located.

The diocese reported 6,539 members in 2015 and 3,759 members in 2025. Plate and pledge income for the 43 filing congregations of the diocese in 2024 was $3,808,143. Average Sunday attendance (ASA) in 2025 was 1,330 persons, down from 2,126 in 2016.

== Bishops ==
- 1. John Henry Hopkins, 1832–1868;
- 2. William H. A. Bissell, 1868–1893;
- 3. Arthur C. A. Hall, 1894–1929
  - William Farrar Weeks, coadjutor, 1913–1914;
  - George Y. Bliss, coadjutor, 1915–1924;
  - Samuel B. Booth, coadjutor, 1925–1929
- 4. Samuel B. Booth, 1929–1935;
- 5. Vedder Van Dyck, 1936–1960;
- 6. Harvey Butterfield, 1961–1973;
- 7. Robert S. Kerr, 1974–1986;
  - Daniel L. Swenson, coadjutor, 1986;
- 8. Daniel L. Swenson, 1987–1993;
- 9. Mary Adelia Rosamond McLeod, 1993–2001;
- 10. Thomas Clark Ely, 2001–2019.
- 11. Shannon MacVean-Brown, (2019–present)

On May 18, 2019, the church elected Shannon MacVean-Brown as the eleventh Bishop of Vermont. Macvean-Brown was consecrated on September 28, 2019 in Ira Allen Chapel in Burlington. Macvean-Brown is the first African-American Bishop of Vermont.

== Diocesan churches of historical interest ==
Present or former diocesan churches listed on the National Register of Historic Places include:

- Christ Church (Guilford, Vermont)
- Church of Our Saviour (Killington, Vermont)
- St. Ann's Episcopal Church (Richford, Vermont)
- St. Bartholomew's Episcopal Church (Montgomery, Vermont)
- St. John's Episcopal Church (Highgate Falls, Vermont)
- St. James' Episcopal Church (Arlington, Vermont)
