= Daniel L. Swenson =

American bishop

The Right Reverend Daniel Lee Swenson D.D.
- Bishop of Vermont
- Church: Episcopal Church
- Diocese: Vermont
- In office: 1987–1993
- Predecessor: Robert S. Kerr
- Successor: Mary Adelia McLeod
- Previous post: Coadjutor Bishop of Vermont (1986-1987)

Orders
- Ordination: June 29, 1961 by Hamilton Hyde Kellogg
- Consecration: May 17, 1986 by Edmond L. Browning

Personal details
- Born: February 2, 1928 Oklahoma City, Oklahoma, United States
- Died: May 24, 2014 (aged 86) Northfield, Minnesota, United States
- Denomination: American
- Parents: Daniel & Lilian Swenson
- Spouse: Sally Mason
- Children: 2

Daniel Lee Swenson (February 2, 1928 - May 24, 2014) was bishop of the Episcopal Diocese of Vermont from 1987 to 1993.

== Biography ==
Swenson was ordained deacon in 1960 and priest on June 29, 1961 in St Martin's by-the-lake, Minnetonka Beach, Minnesota. He served in multiple parishes in Minnesota. In 1986 he was elected as coadjutor bishop of Vermont and a year later succeeded as diocesan bishop. He was consecrated on May 17, 1986, in the Chapel of St Michael the Archangel of Saint Michael's College in Winooski, Vermont. He retired in 1993. Senson died in Northfield, Minnesota on May 24, 2014. He was married to Sally Mason (1927-2012) with whom he had three children.
