= Thomas A. Starkey =

American bishop

The Right Reverend Thomas Alfred Starkey S.T.D., D.D.
- Bishop of Newark
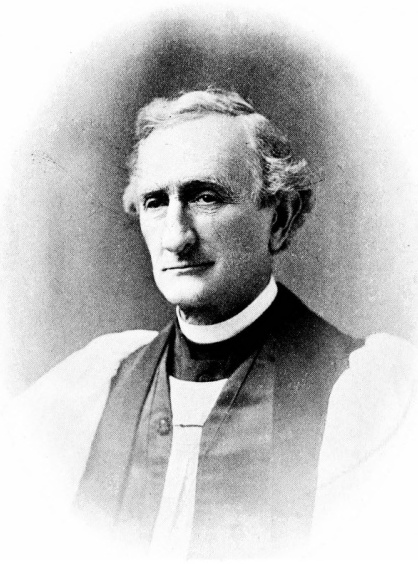
- Church: Episcopal Church
- Diocese: Newark
- Elected: October 28, 1879
- In office: 1880–1903
- Predecessor: William Henry Odenheimer
- Successor: Edwin Stevens Lines

Orders
- Ordination: May 21, 1848 by Alonzo Potter
- Consecration: January 8, 1880 by Thomas M. Clark

Personal details
- Born: March 13, 1819 Philadelphia, Pennsylvania, United States
- Died: May 17, 1903 (aged 84) East Orange, New Jersey, United States
- Buried: Albany Rural Cemetery
- Denomination: Anglican
- Spouse: Julia Rathbone

Thomas Alfred Starkey (March 13, 1819 – May 17, 1903) was bishop of the Episcopal Diocese of Newark from 1880 to 1903.

== Early life and education ==
Starkey was born on March 13, 1819, in Philadelphia, Pennsylvania. He was educated as a civil engineer and practiced that profession from 1839 to 1845. On September 3, 1844, he was accepted as a candidate for the priesthood in the Diocese of Pennsylvania. He graduated in 1847. He was awarded a Doctor of Sacred Theology from Hobart College in 1864.

== Ordained ministry ==
Starkey was ordained deacon on February 21, 1847, in the Church of the Ascension in Philadelphia and a priest on May 21, 1848, in Trinity Church, Pottsville, Pennsylvania, both by Bishop Alonzo Potter of Pennsylvania. He was assigned a missionary work in Schuylkill County, Pennsylvania, where he established the Church of the Holy Apostles in St. Clair, Pennsylvania. In 1850 he became rector of Christ Church in Troy, New York, and in 1854 rector of St Paul's Church in Albany, New York. In 1858 he became rector of Trinity Church in Cleveland, Ohio, and between 1869 and 1872 he served as rector of Epiphany Church in Washington D.C. In 1877 he transferred to Paterson, New Jersey, to become rector of St Paul's Church.

== Episcopacy ==
Starkey was elected Bishop of Northern New Jersey in 1879 and was consecrated on January 8, 1880, by Bishop Thomas M. Clark of Rhode Island and future Presiding Bishop. Starkey was consecrated in Grace Church in Newark, New Jersey. In 1888, upon the name change of the diocese, he became the first to hold the title of Bishop of Newark.
