= Thomas C. Ely =

American Episcopal priest (1951–2025)

The Right Reverend Thomas Clark Ely D. Min.
- [Episcopal Diocese of Vermont|Bishop of Vermont]
- Church: Episcopal
- Diocese: Vermont
- Elected: 2000
- In office: 2001–2019
- Predecessor: Mary Adelia McLeod
- Successor: Shannon MacVean-Brown

Orders
- Ordination: 1980 by The Right Rev. Arthur E. Walmsley
- Consecration: April 28, 2001 by The Rt. Rev. Douglas E. Theuner

Personal details
- Born: December 14, 1951 Norwalk, Connecticut, U.S.
- Died: August 30, 2025 (aged 73) Rutland, Vermont, U.S.
- Denomination: Episcopalian
- Parents: Leonard C. Ely, Shirley (Parker) Ely
- Spouse: Martha Ann Wiggins
- Children: Daughters, Katherine Ann (Ely) Foecking and Jennifer Ann Ely
- Education: Western Connecticut State University

Thomas Clark Ely (December 14, 1951 – August 30, 2025) was an American Episcopal priest who served as the 10th Bishop of Vermont from 2001 to 2019. Tom was born in Norwalk, CT in December of 1951. He attended local public schools in Norwalk.

== Education and career ==
Ely graduated from Western Connecticut State University in 1975 with a degree in Speech and Theater. In 1980, he received a Master of Divinity degree from the University of the South in Sewanee, Tennessee. While a student at the University, he was awarded the Woods Leadership Award at the of his Freshman Year. In 2003, he was awarded an honorary doctorate.

Following ordination as a deacon and priest in the Diocese of Connecticut in 1980, Ely worked for the Middlesex regional ministry for 10 years as an assistant missioner. From 1980 to 1985 he directed the Diocesan youth ministry and its retreat center and summer camp at Camp Washington. From 1991 to 2001, Ely was the Missioner for the Greater Hartford Regional Ministry.

Ely served as the 10th Bishop of Vermont from 2001 to 2019. During his tenure he was involved in ecumenical, international and youth activities. He was especially supportive of the LGBTQ+ community within the Episcopal Church and in his local community. In retirement, he was very involved in the two local theater groups.

== Personal life and death ==
In 1976 Ely married Martha Ann Wiggins, with whom he had two daughters. He died in Rutland, Vermont, on August 30, 2025, at the age of 73 of esophageal cancer.
