= Mark M. Beckwith =

American bishop

The Right Reverend Mark M. Beckwith D.D.
- Bishop of Newark
- Church: Episcopal Church
- Diocese: Newark
- Elected: September 23, 2006
- In office: 2007–2018
- Predecessor: John P. Croneberger
- Successor: Carlye J. Hughes

Orders
- Ordination: 1980 by Morgan Porteus
- Consecration: January 27, 2007 by Katharine Jefferts Schori

Personal details
- Denomination: Anglican

Mark M. Beckwith was the tenth bishop of the Episcopal Diocese of Newark. He is the author of the book Seeing the Unseen: Beyond Prejudices, Paradigms and Party Lines.

== Biography ==
Beckwith graduated from Amherst College in 1973 and from Berkeley Divinity School at Yale University in 1978.

He was ordained as an Episcopal priest in 1980. He served as associate rector at St Peter's Church in Morristown, New Jersey from 1982 to 1985, then became rector of Christ Church in Hackensack, New Jersey (1985–1993). Before his bishop election, he served as rector of All Saints Church in Worcester, Massachusetts (1993–2006). He was consecrated as the tenth Bishop of Newark on January 27, 2007, by Presiding Bishop Katharine Jefferts Schori.

Beckwith has appeared in two PBS specials with Jon Meacham, God in New York (2010) and Christians, Muslims, and Jews: Bridging the Divide (2011).

He has also been a featured guest in several interviews and panel discussions on MSNBC's Morning Joe show.

From 2017 to 2019, Beckwith co-hosted a television talk show series on NJ PBS titled A Matter of Faith with a Bishop, an Imam and a Rabbi. The show premiered on April 12, 2017, and was hosted by Bishop Mark Beckwith, Imam W. Deen Shariff and Rabbi Matthew Gewirtz, who lead conversations with special invited guests and discussed "headlining news through the lens of faith." Beckwith's last day as Bishop was September 22, 2018, when his successor Carlye J. Hughes was consecrated.

Beckwith and his wife, Marilyn Olson, have been married since 1982. They have two children together.

== Activism ==
In the Diocese of Newark, Beckwith co-founded Morris Shelter, Inc., a nonprofit homeless shelter in Morristown, New Jersey, and was the first president of Inter-Religious Fellowship for the Homeless in Bergen County.

On December 7, 2009, as active Bishop of Newark, Beckwith joined other Episcopalians to urge the New Jersey state Senate to pass a marriage equality bill. He testified before the Senate Judiciary Committee, saying "I pray that the marriage bill passes – so that all couples who have engaged in a lifelong union can have their unions recognized. Homosexuality is not an issue of lifestyle; it is a matter of identity. We don't choose our identity; we are challenged to claim our identity as God's gift to us. The church I have chosen to serve is about helping all of God's children claim and celebrate their identity as imago dei – as created in the image of God."

Beckwith helped found the Newark Interfaith Coalition for Hope and Peace in 2008 to reduce street violence among gangs in Newark and to encourage interfaith dialogue and cooperation.

In 2012, Beckwith co-founded Bishops United Against Gun Violence, an advocacy network of over 100 Episcopal Church bishops. The group was formed in response to the Sandy Hook Elementary School shooting in Newtown, Connecticut. In 2019, Beckwith began serving as a bishop liaison to the network to foster relationships and develop partnerships with groups working in the gun violence prevention arena.

Beckwith has been part of the leadership team for Braver Angels, a national movement dedicated to political depolarization.

== Bibliography ==
- Seeing the Unseen: Beyond Prejudices, Paradigms and Party Lines (New York: Morehouse Publishing, 2022) ISBN 9781640655188

== See also ==
- List of Episcopal bishops of the United States
- Historical list of the Episcopal bishops of the United States
