= Mary Adelia McLeod =

American bishop (1938–2022)

The Right Reverend Mary Adelia McLeod
- Bishop of Vermont
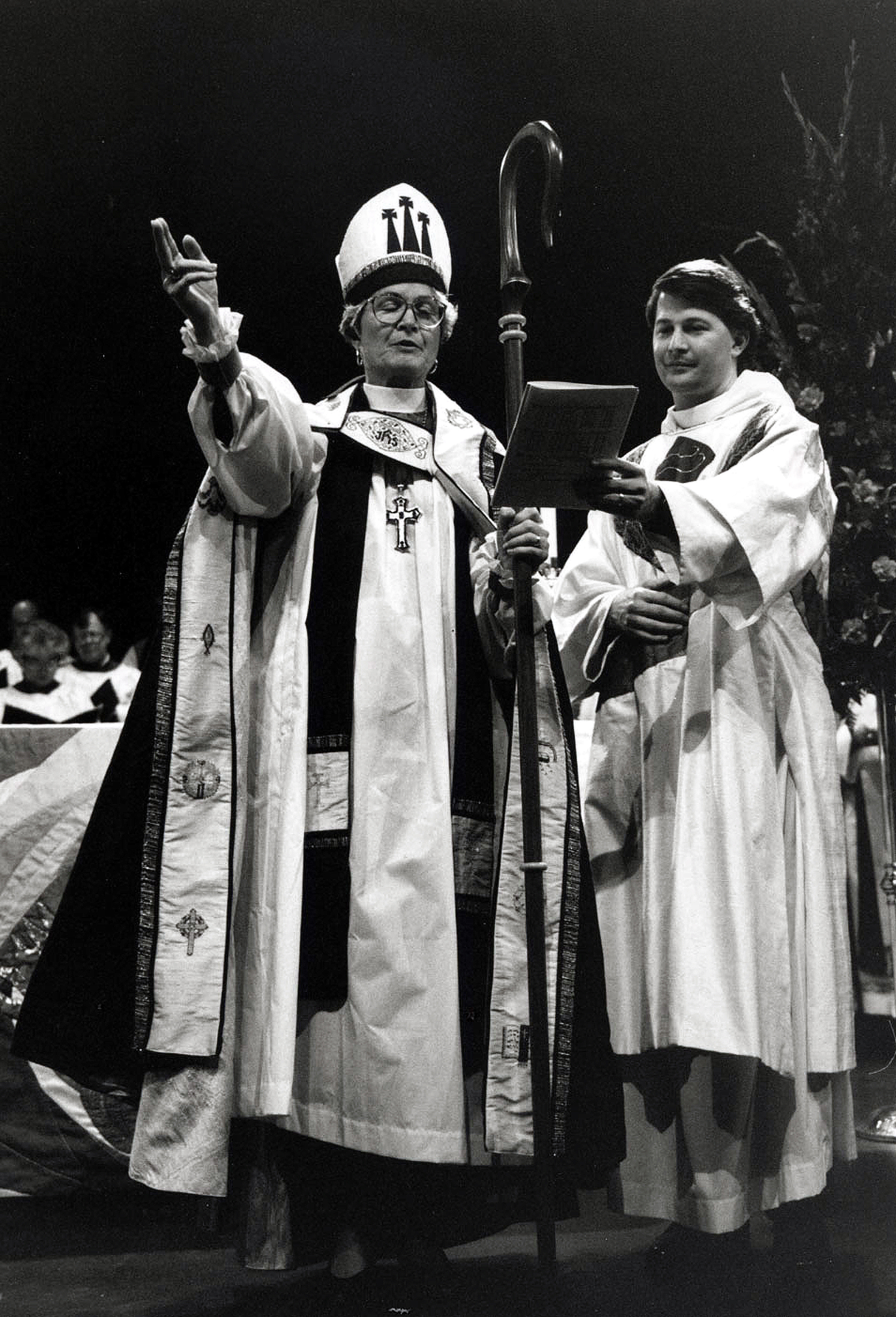
- McLeod blessing the people at her consecration, November 1993. Her son, the Rev. Harrison McLeod, is at her side.
- Church: Episcopal Church
- Elected: June 5, 1993
- In office: 1993–2001
- Predecessor: Daniel L. Swenson
- Successor: Thomas C. Ely
- Previous post: Archdeacon for southern West Virginia (1983–1993)

Orders
- Ordination: December 1980 by Bill Stough
- Consecration: November 1, 1993 by Edmond L. Browning

Personal details
- Born: September 27, 1938 Birmingham, Alabama, U.S.
- Died: October 12, 2022 (aged 84) Charleston, West Virginia, U.S.
- Denomination: Episcopal
- Spouse: Henry Marvin McLeod (m. Nov 25, 1970)
- Children: 5
- Education: University of Alabama

Mary Adelia Rosamond McLeod (September 27, 1938 – October 12, 2022) was the first woman diocesan bishop in the Episcopal Church. She was elected bishop of the Diocese of Vermont on June 5, 1993, at a special convention held at the Cathedral Church of St. Paul in Burlington. Clergy and lay delegates selected her from among five nominees.

== Consecration ==
McLeod was consecrated as the Ninth Bishop of Vermont on All Saints' Day, November 1, 1993, at the Flynn Center for the Performing Arts in Burlington Vermont. The principal consecrator was Edmond L. Browning, the then Presiding Bishop of the Episcopal Church. Michael Peers, Primate of the Anglican Church of Canada and 28 Episcopal and Anglican bishops participated in the historic service. A capacity crowd attended the event, which was televised nationwide by satellite.

The service included a hymn commissioned for the occasion, "God, beyond all human praises". The music was composed by Richard Wayne Dirksen, words by Charles P. Price.

== Life and career ==
Mary Adelia Rosamond McLeod was born on September 27, 1938, in Birmingham, Alabama. Following high school, she attended the University of Alabama where she majored in history and was a member of the Kappa Delta sorority.

Following college, she married and raised five children. During this period, she was a member and officer of the Junior League of Birmingham, Alabama, and a community volunteer. She was an active member of St. Luke’s Episcopal Church in Mountain Brook, Alabama. At age 39, she entered seminary.

McLeod received an L.Th. degree from the School of Theology, University of the South (Sewanee) in 1980. She ranked second in her class.

McLeod was ordained a deacon in June 1980 and a priest in December the same year. After ordination, she was co-rector of St. Timothy’s Episcopal Church, Athens, Alabama, from 1980 to 1983 and co-rector of St. John’s Episcopal Church, Charleston, West Virginia, from 1983 to 1993. She also served as archdeacon for southern West Virginia.

McLeod held honorary degrees from Smith College (L.H.D.), Episcopal Divinity School (D.D.), and the University of Charleston (D.D.).

== Accomplishments as bishop ==
McLeod served as bishop of the Diocese of Vermont from 1993 until 2001 when she retired.

Accomplishments during her episcopacy include:

- The Diocese of Vermont grew by 49.5% in number of communicants and was the third fastest growing diocese in the Episcopal Church during the decade that included her tenure.
- Through her emphasis on stewardship education, the average pledge increased significantly.
- She restructured the diocesan office, council, committees, and other diocesan organizations and systems, resulting in more efficiency and accountability.
- She fostered innovative programs for small congregations, including regional ministry and mutual ministry where lay people performed some functions traditionally done by clergy.
- After inheriting major financial problems, she instituted balanced budgets, regular audits, and other sound and transparent financial practices.
- She led a successful capital campaign creating an Endowment for Congregation Programs, outreach, and capital improvements.
- Created a safe, open environment in the diocese for discussion of difficult and possibly contentious issues.

On her retirement, one Vermont Episcopalian described McLeod as "Firm, Friendly, Focused, Fiscal, Funny, and of course Feminine".

== Ministries in the national church ==
McLeod's national Episcopal Church ministries included; secretary of the House of Bishops, one of three bishops appointed by the presiding bishop to respond to alleged bishop misconduct, Board of Pastoral Development, Board of the Episcopal Women’s Caucus, Dialogue on Human Sexuality Committee, Board of Kanuga Conference Center, Board of Visitors for Episcopal Divinity School, Stewardship Consultation Committee, vice-chair of the Canons Committee, General Convention Planning Committee, Rules of Order Committee, Ad Hoc Committee to Study Insurance Issues, Judge, House of Bishops Trial Court, College for Bishops Committee, and Dispatch of Business Committee.

== Commitment to rights of LGBT people ==
McLeod was a long-time supporter of full inclusion and rights of lesbian, gay, bisexual, and transgender (LGBT) people both in the church and in society. When the Vermont General Assembly debated proposed legislation to extend marriage benefits to gay and lesbian couples, she testified before the House Judiciary Committee urging approval of the bill. "Such action will serve to strengthen [the state's] social fabric and is not a threat to traditional marriage", she said to the committee.

In February 2000, McLeod enunciated her views on LGBT rights in a pastoral letter to the Diocese of Vermont titled "Let the Church Be the First to Issue an Emancipation Proclamation". In it, she stated that "Heterosexual and homosexual people are equally capable of entering into life-long unions of love, mutual support and fidelity" and that "God's great gift of love and the expression of that love cannot and should not be denied to those among us who happen to be homosexual." She requested that the letter be read in every Episcopal church in Vermont.

== Personal life and death ==
McLeod's published writings include a major piece in A Voice of Our Own: Leading American Women Celebrate the Right to Vote and a poem, "Granny's Treasure", in Women’s Uncommon Prayers: Our Lives Revealed, Nurtured, Celebrated.

McLeod was married to the Rev. Henry M. McLeod III, and had five children and eight grandchildren. She died on October 12, 2022, at the age of 84.
