= Theodore R. Ludlow =

American prelate

The Right Reverend Theodore Russell Ludlow D.D., LL.D.
- Suffragan Bishop of Newark
- Church: Episcopal Church
- Diocese: Newark
- Elected: October 10, 1935
- In office: 1936–1953
- Successor: Donald MacAdie

Orders
- Ordination: February 1912 by Logan H. Roots
- Consecration: January 25, 1936 by James De Wolf Perry

Personal details
- Born: July 14, 1883 Valley Creek, Texas, United States
- Died: November 13, 1961 (aged 78) Wareham, Massachusetts, United States
- Denomination: Anglican
- Parents: Samuel Russell Ludlow & Mary Hoagland Vermilye
- Spouse: Helen Roosevelt Lincoln
- Children: 3

Theodore Russell Ludlow (July 14, 1883 – November 13, 1961) was an American prelate of the Episcopal Church who served as the Suffragan Bishop of Newark from 1936 till 1953.

== Early life and education ==
Ludlow was born on July 14, 1883, in Valley Creek, Texas, the son of Samuel Russell Ludlow (1853-1936) and Mary Hoagland Vermilye. He studied at Austin College and graduated with a Bachelor of Arts in 1903. He then studied at Columbia University and earned his Bachelor of Laws and Master of Arts in 1907. He then studied thought history and political science at Austin College between 1907 and 1908, before doing some postgraduate studies at Harvard University from 1908 till 1909, before enrolling at the Episcopal Theological School, from where he graduated with a Bachelor of Divinity in 1911. That same year he married Helen Roosevelt Lincoln (1890-1985), on June 7, 1911, and together they had three sons. He was awarded a Doctor of Divinity from Austin College in 1923 and another from Rutgers University in 1940. He was also awarded a Doctor of Laws from Austin College in 1949.

== Ordained ministry ==
Ludlow was ordained deacon on June 6, 1911 by Bishop William Lawrence of Massachusetts, in St Paul's Church, Boston. He was then ordained priest in February 1912 by Logan H. Roots, Bishop of Hankow in China. In 1911, he travelled to China to server as a missionary. Between 1911 and 1916, he was a professor of Political Science at Boone University in Wuhan. He also served as a political adviser to the provisional Government in Wuhan from 1911 till 1912. He then served as an assistant at the Department for Missions between 1916 and 1918. Between 1918 and 1919 he served as a welfare worker with the American Expeditionary Forces Chinese battalion in France.

Upon his return to the United States in 1920, he became assistant at St John's Church in Waterbury, Connecticut, shortly before becoming rector of St Paul's Church in Newton Highlands, Massachusetts. In 1923, he moved to Topeka, Kansas to become the Dean of Grace Cathedral. In 1927 he became secretary of the National Council's Department of Religious Education. Between 1931 and 1936, he served as rector of the Church of the Holy Communion in South Orange, New Jersey.

== Bishop ==
On October 10, 1935, Ludlow was elected Suffragan Bishop of Newark and was consecrated on January 25, 1936 by Presiding Bishop James De Wolf Perry. He retained the post till his retirement in 1953. He died in Wareham, Massachusetts, on November 13, 1961.
