= Wilson Reiff Stearly =

American bishop

The Right Reverend Wilson Reiff Stearly D.D.
- Bishop of Newark
- Church: Episcopal Church
- Diocese: Newark
- In office: 1927–1935
- Predecessor: Edwin Stevens Lines
- Successor: Benjamin M. Washburn
- Previous posts: Suffragan Bishop of Newark (1915-1917); Coadjutor Bishop of Newark (1917-1927)

Orders
- Ordination: July 31, 1900 by William Andrew Leonard
- Consecration: October 21, 1915 by Edwin Stevens Lines

Personal details
- Born: May 8, 1869 Philadelphia, Pennsylvania, United States
- Died: November 8, 1941 (aged 72) Montclair, New Jersey, United States
- Buried: St Stephen's Cemetery, Millburn, New Jersey
- Denomination: Anglican
- Parents: Wilson Stearly & Mary Reiff
- Spouse: Helen B. Neuhauser
- Children: 3

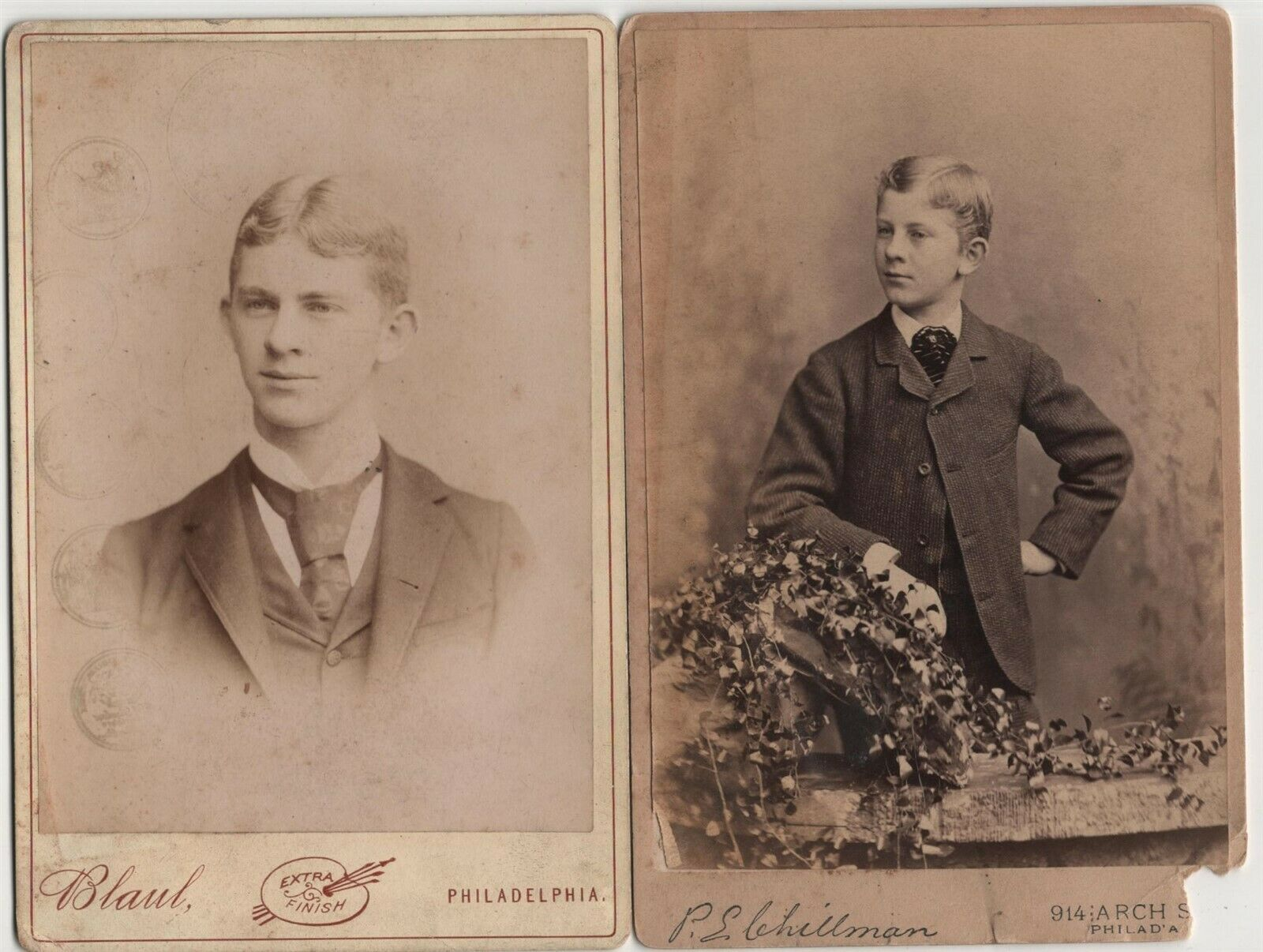

Wilson Reiff Stearly (May 8, 1869 – November 3, 1941) was the fourth bishop of Newark in The Episcopal Church from 1927 to 1935.

== Early life and education ==
Stearly was born on May 8, 1869, in Philadelphia, Pennsylvania, the son of Wilson Stearly and Mary Reiff. He was raised as a Reformed Christian. He graduated with a Bachelor of Arts from Philadelphia High School in 1886. Afterwards, he spent a year studying in Paris and Berlin. In 1887 he enrolled at the Union Theological Seminary and graduated in 1889. He was awarded a Doctor of Divinity from Kenyon College in 1915 and from Case Western Reserve University in 1916.

== Ordained ministry ==
Stearly was ordained a minister in the Reformed Church in 1889 and served as pastor of Hough Avenue Reformed Church in Cleveland, Ohio between 1889 and 1899. He joined the Episcopal Church and was ordained deacon on June 10, 1900, and a priest on July 31, 1900, by Bishop William Andrew Leonard of Ohio. He became rector of Emmanuel Church in Cleveland, Ohio and remained there till 1909 when he became rector of the Church of Holy Apostles in Philadelphia. In 1912 he became rector of St Luke's Church in Montclair, New Jersey.

== Bishop ==
Stearly was elected Suffragan Bishop of Newark in May 1915 and was consecrated in St Luke's Church on October 21, 1915, by Edwin Stevens Lines, Bishop of Newark. On May 22, 1917, he was elected Coadjutor Bishop of Newark and then succeeded as diocesan bishop on October 25, 1927. He resigned as Bishop of Newark due to ill health and was succeeded by the Coadjutor Bishop of Newark Benjamin M. Washburn in November 1935. Stearly died on November 3, 1941, in Millburn, New Jersey.

== Family ==
Stearly married Helen B. Neuhauser on February 12, 1895, and together had three children.
