= George Rath =

American bishop

The Right Reverend George Edward Rath S.T.D.
- Bishop of Newark
- Church: Episcopal Church
- Diocese: Newark
- In office: 1974–1979
- Predecessor: Leland Stark
- Successor: John Shelby Spong
- Previous posts: Suffragan Bishop of Newark (1964-1970); Coadjutor Bishop of Newark (1970-1974)

Orders
- Ordination: June 1939 by William T. Manning
- Consecration: March 6, 1964 by Arthur C. Lichtenberger

Personal details
- Born: March 29, 1913 Buffalo, New York, United States
- Died: November 18, 1995 (aged 82) Brewster, Massachusetts, United States
- Denomination: Anglican
- Parents: Edward Fritz Rath & Eudora Pearl Chadderdon
- Spouse: Margaret Webber
- Children: 2

George Edward Rath (March 29, 1913 – November 18, 1995) was the seventh Bishop of Newark.

== Biography ==
Rath was born in Buffalo, New York, and ordained as a deacon in 1938. He received his undergraduate degree cum laude from Harvard University in 1933, and a master of divinity degree from Union Theological Seminary in 1936. He was ordained as a priest in 1939 for the Diocese of New York where he served as college chaplain for Columbia University and New York University. In 1941 he became the vicar of All Saints Church in Millington, New Jersey. He later became the rector of the church and then the Archdeacon of Morris County. He was elected suffragan bishop of Newark in 1964 when he succeeded Donald MacAdie. He was consecrated by Arthur C. Lichtenberger as chief consecrator.

He was elected coadjutor bishop on May 2, 1970. He became diocesan bishop in 1974 and retired in 1978. As bishop, he championed the causes of the civil rights movement, the anti-Vietnam War movement, and prayer book reform. He was also a long-standing supporter of ordination for women, but waited to do so until the practice had been definitively approved by the Episcopal Church, unlike more radical bishops.

He and his wife, Margaret, had two children.
