= St. Luke's Church (Montclair, New Jersey) =

Historic church in New Jersey, United States

- U.S. National Register of Historic Places
- New Jersey Register of Historic Places
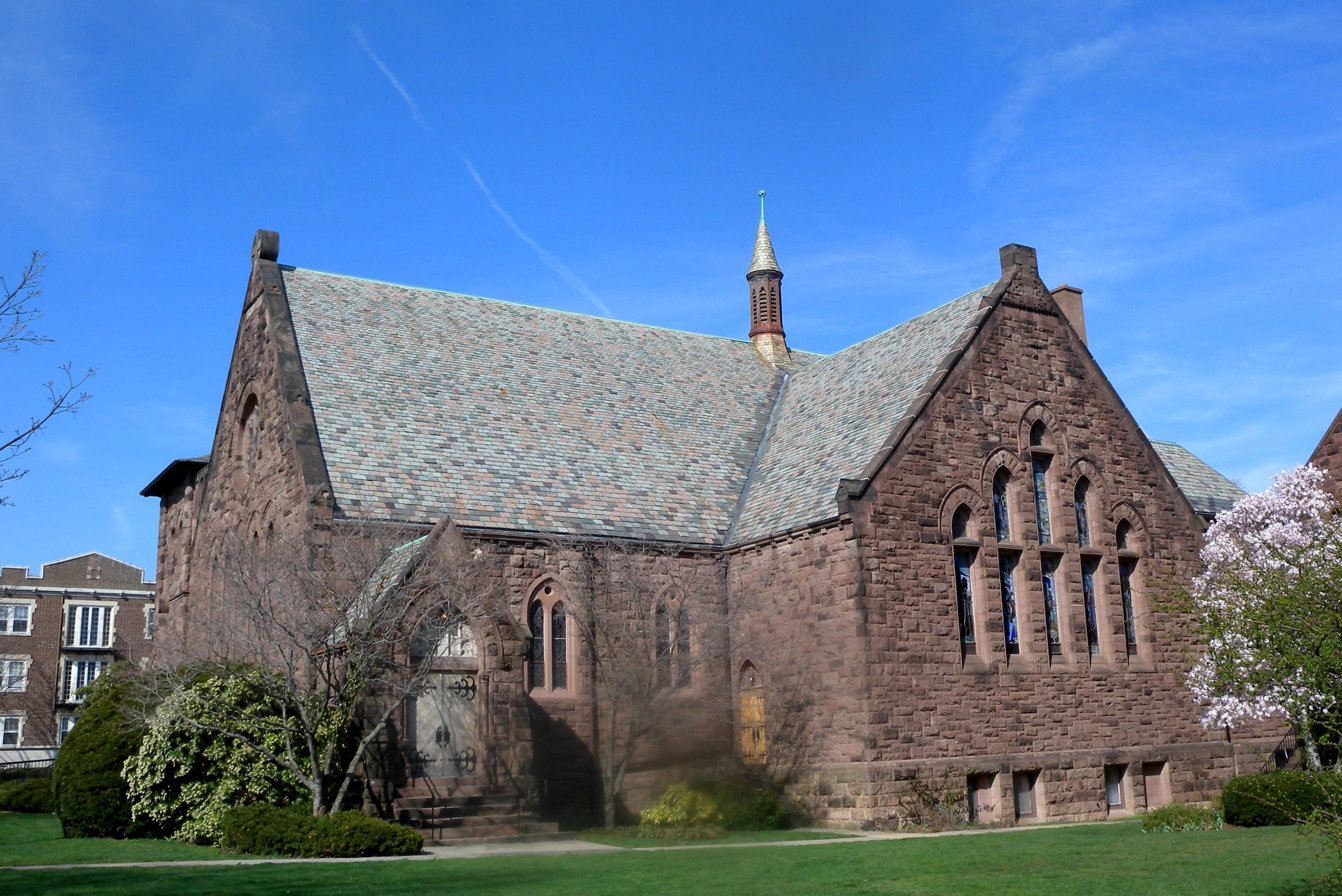

- Location within Essex County, New Jersey Location within New Jersey Location within the United States
- Location: 73 S. Fullerton Avenue, Montclair, New Jersey
- Coordinates: 40°48′36″N 74°13′6″W
- Area: less than one acre
- Built: 1889
- Architects: Robertson, R.H.; Upjohn, Herbert B.
- Architectural style: Gothic, Romanesque, Richardsonian Romanesque
- MPS: Montclair MRA
- NRHP reference No.: 86003045
- NJRHP No.
- Added to NRHP: July 01, 1988

St. Luke's Episcopal Church is an Episcopal parish in Montclair, Essex County, New Jersey, United States, in the Episcopal Diocese of Newark.

The church reported 617 members in 2021 and 703 members in 2023; no membership statistics were reported nationally in 2024 parochial reports. Plate and pledge income reported for the congregation in 2024 was $559,839. Average Sunday attendance (ASA) in 2023 was 162 persons, down from a reported 217 in 2015.

Its historic parish church, at 73 S. Fullerton Avenue was built in 1889 and added to the National Register in 1988. The British-born organist Mark Andrews served as the church's organist from 1902 to 1912.

== See also ==
- National Register of Historic Places listings in Essex County, New Jersey
