= Episcopal Diocese of Newark =

Episcopal Church diocese in the US

Coordinates: 40.737671°N 74.167338°W

Diocese of Newark Diœcesis Newarkensis

Location
- Country: United States
- Territory: northern third of New Jersey
- Ecclesiastical province: Province II

Statistics
- Congregations: 89 (2025)
- Members: 15,727 (2025)

Information
- Denomination: Episcopal Church
- Established: 1874
- Cathedral: Trinity & St. Philip's Cathedral
- Language: English, Korean, Malayalam, Spanish

Current leadership
- Bishop: Carlye J. Hughes

Map
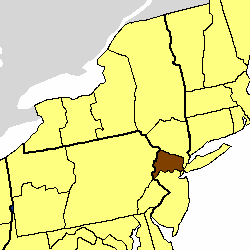
- Location of the Diocese of Newark

Website
- www.dioceseofnewark.org

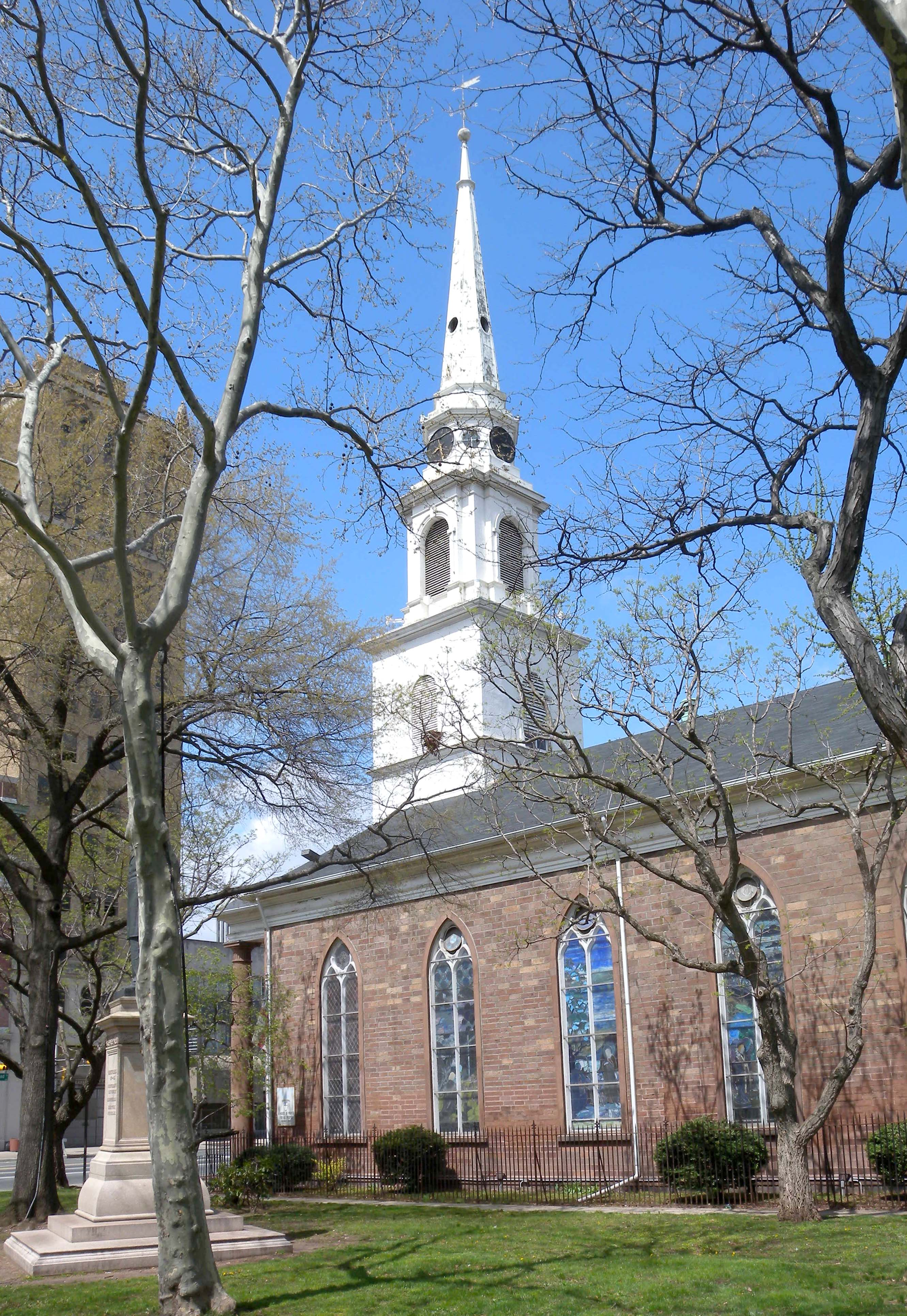
Trinity & St. Philip's Cathedral

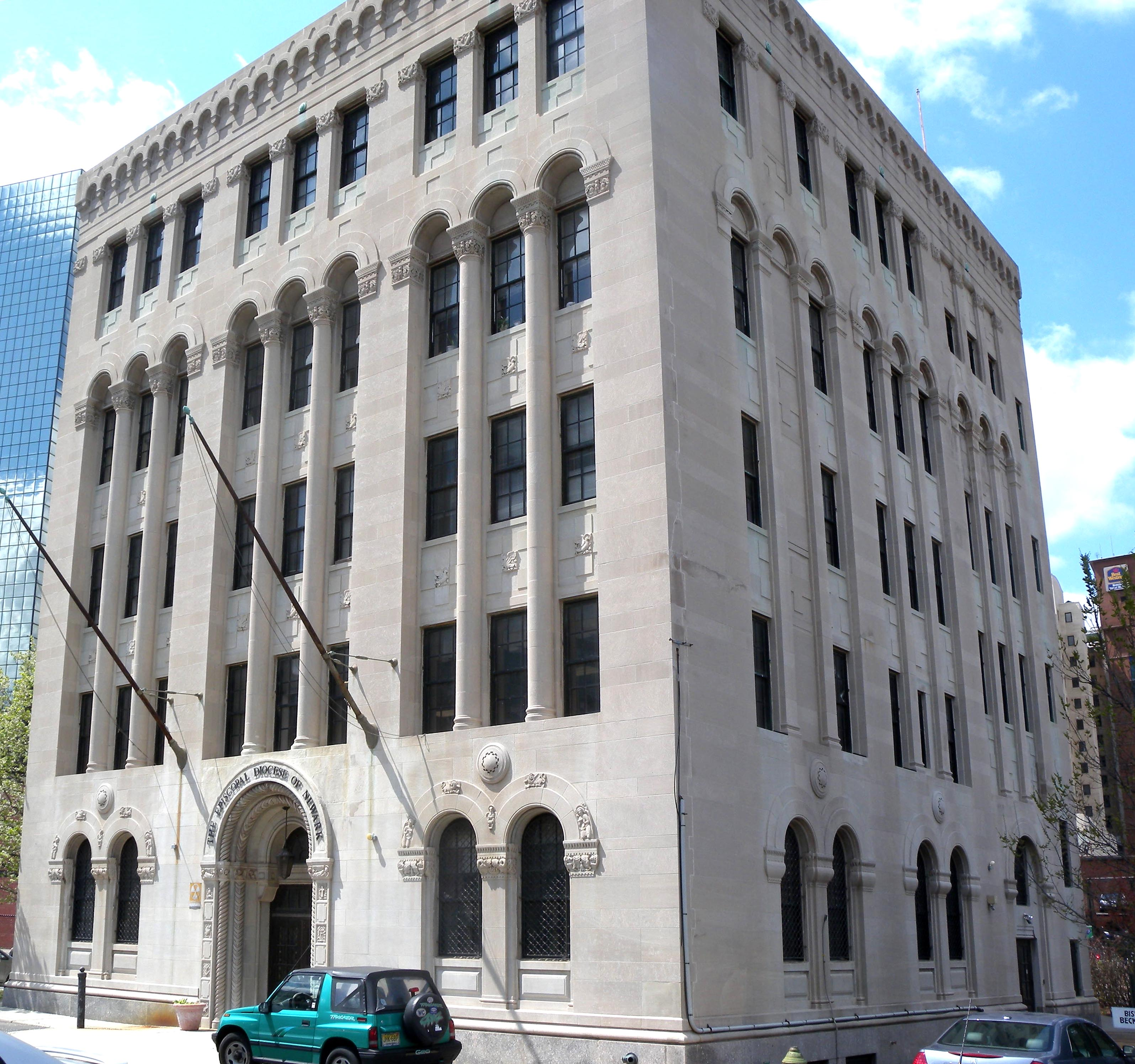
Episcopal House

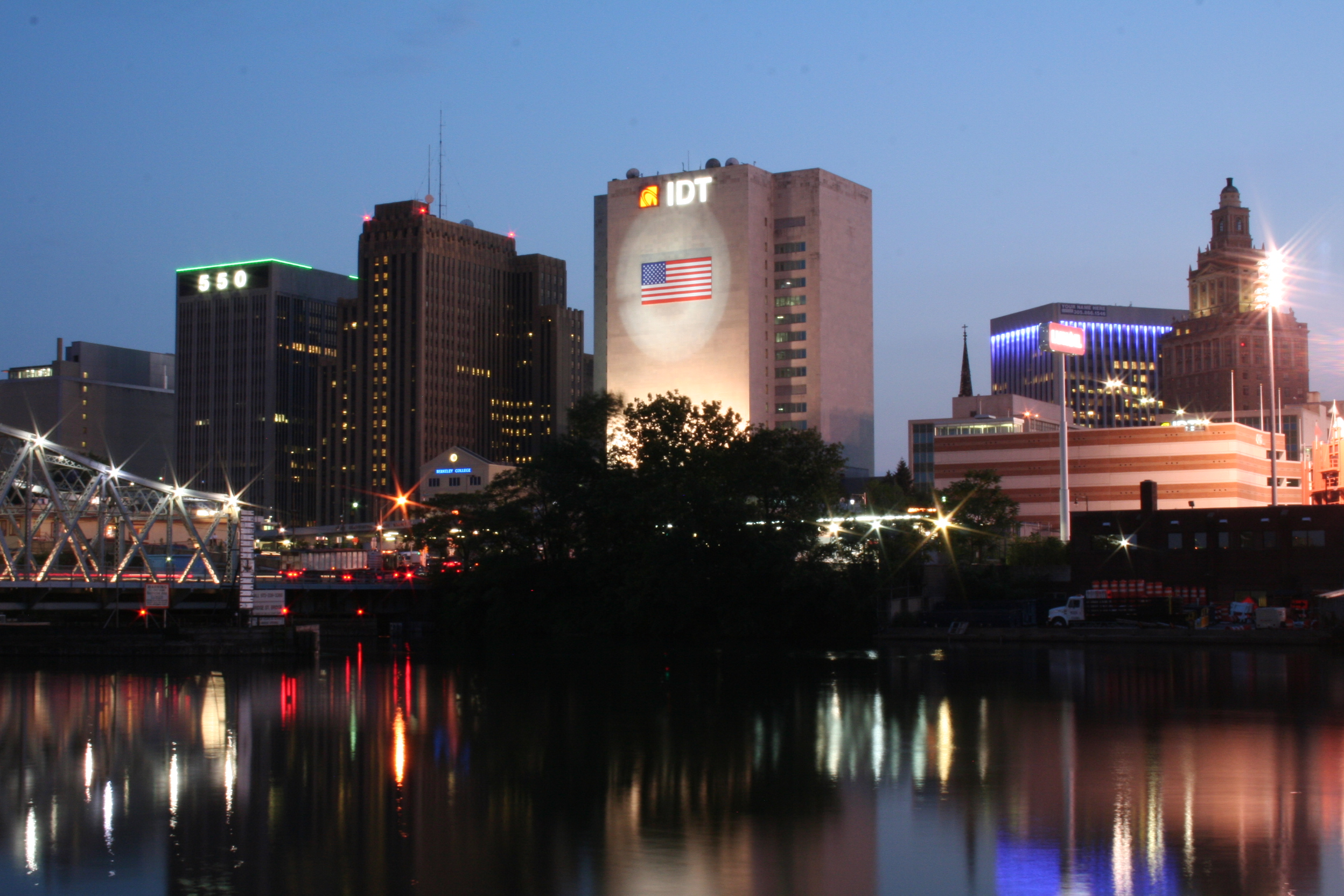
The see city of Newark, New Jersey forms part of the densely populated New York metropolitan area

The Episcopal Diocese of Newark is a diocese of the Episcopal Church in the United States of America comprising the northern third of New Jersey in the United States. The Diocese is part of the Anglican Communion, of which the Episcopal Church is a province. It includes Episcopal parishes, missions, outreach ministries and schools in the New Jersey counties of Bergen, Essex, Hudson, Morris, Passaic, Sussex, Warren, and one church in Union County.

The diocese reported 24,890 members in 2015 and 15,727 members in 2025. Plate and pledge income for the 89 filing congregations of the diocese in 2025 was $14,078,971; average Sunday attendance (ASA) in 2025 was 4,364 persons. This was a relative decrease from 7,729 persons attending on an average Sunday reported in 2015.

== History ==
Though Newark was originally a Puritan settlement, Anglicans have been worshiping in the area since 1695. An Anglican congregation was established in Newark by 1729 and a church, Trinity Church, was under construction in 1742. Two other current parishes, Christ Church in what is now Belleville (1746) and Christ Church in Newton (1769), were established by charter of the British Crown. The church, with its association with Britain, suffered during the American Revolutionary War, but by the time the first bishop of New Jersey was elected in 1815, there were 27 congregations. By 1832, there were 85 congregations statewide.

The Diocese of Northern New Jersey was separated from the larger Diocese of New Jersey in 1874. The new diocese had 64 congregations and established Christ Hospital in Jersey City. The diocese took its present name in 1886, and by 1903 there were over 100 congregations. Despite the Great Depression that number rose to 153 by 1931.

In June 1967, the region was rocked by the Newark riots which began the diocese's growing role as a catalyst for social change. The first-ever national conference for Black empowerment took place at Trinity Cathedral, and in 1969 the Rev. Canon Dillard Robinson became the first African-American dean of any Episcopal cathedral. Bishop Leland Stark was also vocal in the peace movement during the Vietnam War and in favor of women's ordination to the priesthood. His successor, George Edward Rath, would during his tenure advocate adoption of the 1979 Book of Common Prayer and two of the Philadelphia Eleven (the first female priests ordained in the USA) eventually became priests of the Diocese.

The next bishop, John Shelby Spong, was and remains a lightning-rod for controversy. In addition to his positions on war and the ordination of women, Spong advocated for the ordination of gay and lesbian clergy, a stance which drew much criticism and continues to be a subject for much contention in the church. Since his retirement, Spong enjoyed considerable success as a writer and public speaker. Under Spong's watch, the Oasis Commission, the first diocesan ministry to LGBT persons, was formed. Spong's many books have challenged Christian orthodoxy, including the Virgin Birth and the physical Resurrection of Jesus. He also described as "barbaric" the notion that Jesus Christ died for the sins of all mankind.

Under the ninth bishop, John P. Croneberger, the diocese continued to be in the vanguard of radical inclusion. Croneberger directed the creation of an established liturgy for the blessing of same-sex relationships, oversaw the massive diocesan response to the September 11 attacks, and brought the ownership of Christ Hospital back under diocesan control.

Croneberger also established a Canon for Congregational Development, which is helping churches with the challenging task of planning for the future. In the past 30 or so years the diocese has struggled to keep up with the growing population in the region. 23 congregations have closed (compared with a 2% increase nationwide) due to dropping attendance. A major obstacle is the concentration of churches, many of which are over 100 years old, in traditional population centers that do not reflect the growth patterns in the state. Numerous churches are within five miles of 15 other congregations. Another diocesan commission, the Bethsaida Team, helps churches overcome obstacles for people with disabilities.

From 2005 to 2010 not only did attendance decrease, but so did donations and several churches were closed.

== Tenth bishop ==
On September 23, 2006, the Rev. Mark M. Beckwith, a former associate rector of St. Peter's Episcopal Church in Morristown, New Jersey, was elected bishop of Newark on the third ballot from a field of six candidates. He was consecrated on January 27, 2007 at the New Jersey Performing Arts Center in Newark.

The election brought some controversy because one candidate, Michael Barlowe, was openly gay. The New York Times reported that the announcement of the candidate list coincided with two calls for restraint on the issue. The first plea was from the national church's 75th General Convention. The second was a proposal from Archbishop of Canterbury, Dr. Rowan Williams that could exclude provinces with gay bishops from full membership of the Anglican Communion.

== Eleventh bishop ==
On May 19, 2018, the Rev. Carlye J. Hughes was elected from among three candidates on the first ballot to be the eleventh Bishop of Newark. She was consecrated on September 22, 2018, at the New Jersey Performing Arts Center in Newark. She was previously the rector at Trinity Episcopal Church in Fort Worth, Texas, which is in the continuing Episcopal Diocese of Fort Worth (Episcopal Church). She is the first woman and the first African-American to hold the office.

== Bishops of the Episcopal Diocese of Newark ==
#	Portrait	Bishop	Term	Notes
-	-	Uzal Ogden, Jr.	-	While elected as bishop at a diocesan convention 1798, he was not consecrated as the General Convention considered him too "Methodistical" and for having abandoned the Prayer Book in favour of "extemporaneous prayers". He joined the Presbyterians soon after.
-	-	John Croes	1815-1832	As Bishop of New Jersey before partition of the diocese in 1874.
-	-	George Washington Doane	1832-1859	As Bishop of New Jersey.
I	-	William Henry Odenheimer	1859-1879	As Bishop of New Jersey until 1874, afterwards first Bishop of Northern New Jersey.
II	-	Thomas A. Starkey	1880-1903	At first as second Bishop of Northern New Jersey; after 1888 as Bishop of Newark.
III	-	Edwin Stevens Lines	1903-1927	With Wilson Reiff Stearly as Suffragan Bishop (1915) and Coadjutor Bishop (1917)
IV	-	Wilson Reiff Stearly	1927-1935	With Benjamin Martin Washburn as Coadjutor Bishop (1932)
V	-	Benjamin Martin Washburn	1935-1958	With Theodore R. Ludlow as Suffragan Bishop (1936-1953) and Leland Stark as Coadjutor Bishop (1953).
VI	-	Leland Stark	1958-1974	With Donald MacAdie as Suffragan Bishop (1958-1963), and George Rath as Suffragan Bishop (1964), later Coadjutor Bishop (1970).
VII	-	George Rath	1974-1979	With John Shelby Spong as Coadjutor Bishop (1976)
VIII	-	John Shelby Spong	1979-2000	With Walter Cameron Righter as Assistant; Jack Marston McKelvey as Suffragan Bishop (1991-1999); and John Palmer Croneberger as Coadjutor Bishop (1998–2000)
IX	-	John Palmer Croneberger	2000-2007	With Carol Gallagher as Assistant
X	-	*Mark M. Beckwith	2007–2018	
XI	-	Carlye J. Hughes	2018–present	
