= Carlye J. Hughes =

21st-century American Episcopal bishop

The Right Reverend Carlye J. Hughes
- Bishop of Newark
- Church: Episcopal Church
- Diocese: Newark
- Elected: May 19, 2018
- In office: 2018–present
- Predecessor: Mark M. Beckwith

Orders
- Ordination: 2005
- Consecration: September 22, 2018 by Michael Curry

Personal details
- Born: Tulsa, Oklahoma, United States
- Denomination: Anglican
- Spouse: David R. Smedley

Ordination history of Carlye J. Hughes
History
Priestly ordination
- Date: 2005
Episcopal consecration
- Principal consecrator: Most Rev. Michael Curry
- Co-consecrators: DeDe Duncan-Probe, Scott Mayer, Barbara Harris, Mark M. Beckwith, Jennifer Baskerville-Burrows, M. Blair Couch (Ecumenical Consecrator, Moravian Church)
- Date: September 22, 2018
- Place: New Jersey Performing Arts Center

Carlye J. Hughes is the eleventh and current bishop of the Episcopal Diocese of Newark. She was ordained as a bishop on September 22, 2018.

== Early life and education ==
Hughes, a native of Fort Worth, Texas, received a Bachelor of Arts in Drama from the University of Texas at Austin and worked as a corporate trainer for many years before attending seminary at the Virginia Theological Seminary, graduating in 2005. Hughes is currently a Doctor of Ministry student at the School of Theology of the University of the South in Sewanee, TN.

== Ordained ministry ==
Hughes was ordained in 2005. She served in a Lilly Fellowship at St. James' Episcopal Church in New York City, followed by five years as rector of St. Peter's Episcopal Church in Peekskill, New York. Trinity Episcopal Church in Fort Worth, Texas, called Hughes to serve as rector beginning in June 2013. Hughes is the first woman to serve as rector in the Episcopal Diocese of Fort Worth and the first African-American priest to serve in that parish.

== Personal life ==
Hughes is married to David R. Smedley and is the daughter of Coach Robert Hughes, a longtime boys’ high school basketball coach and a member of the Naismith Basketball Hall of Fame.

== See also ==
- List of Episcopal bishops of the United States
- Historical list of the Episcopal bishops of the United States
