= Packer Memorial Chapel =

Historic church in Pennsylvania, United States

- U.S. National Register of Historic Places
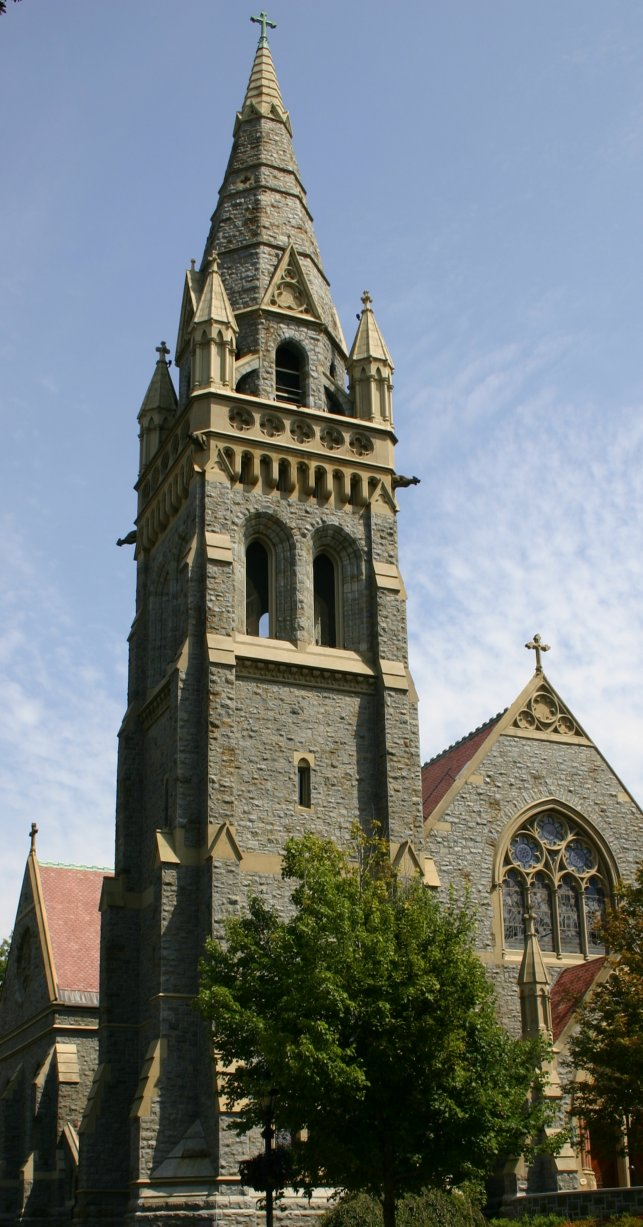

- Location within Pennsylvania Location within the United States
- Location: Packer Avenue, Lehigh University, Bethlehem, Pennsylvania, U.S.
- Coordinates: 40°36′27″N 75°22′41″W
- Area: 1 acre (0.40 ha)
- Built: 1885
- Architect: Addison Hutton
- Architectural style: Gothic Revival
- NRHP reference No.: 79003234
- Added to NRHP: November 20, 1979

Packer Memorial Chapel, also known as Packer Memorial Church, is a historic church on the campus of Lehigh University in Bethlehem, Pennsylvania, United States.

The chapel was added to the National Register of Historic Places in 1979.

== History ==
Packer Memorial Chapel was designed by Philadelphia architect Addison Hutton, and built in 1885 when the university was affiliated with the Episcopal Church. It was donated by Mary Packer Cummings in memory of her father, Asa Packer. The cornerstone was laid on "the seventh Founder's Day, October 8, 1885" and the consecration took place "Two years later, on the ninth Founder's Day, October 13, 1887". Asa Packer was buried in Mauch Chunk Cemetery in Jim Thorpe, Pennsylvania, where his mansion was located.

Currently non-denominational, the chapel is operated by the Office of the University Chaplain. On Sundays, Roman Catholic mass is usually held at 12:10 pm and 9:10 pm in the chapel. On Fridays, Muslim prayers are held at 1:10 pm. The Church is also available for weddings in which at least one of the parties is a Lehigh University student or alumnus. It was also formerly the location of the freshman convocation, held during orientation at the beginning of each school year; however due to growing class size, convocations were moved to the larger Baker Auditorium in the Zoellner Arts Center, beginning in 2007.

"The Catacombs", was named on February 1, 1969 for a coffee house in the basement of the church. It soon became disused and was later a social meeting place for graduate student.

Asa Packer was buried in Mauch Chunk Cemetery, Jim Thorpe, Pennsylvania, where his mansion was located.

== Gallery ==
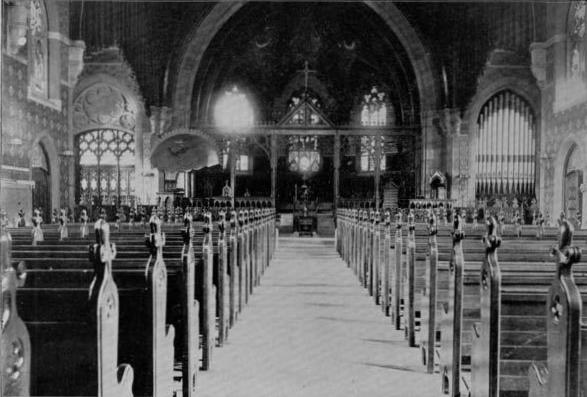
Interior in 1896

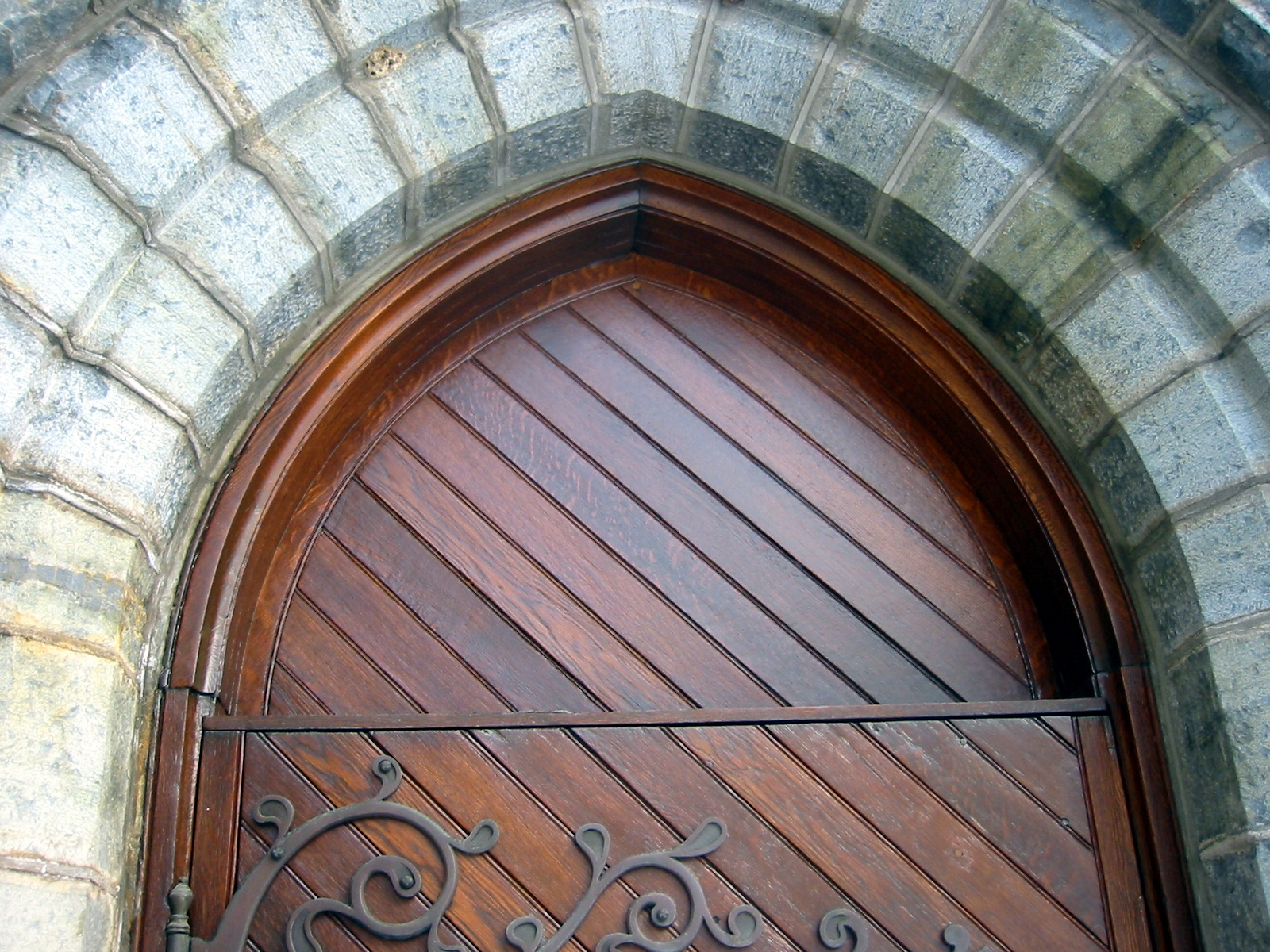
Above an entrance to Packer Memorial Church

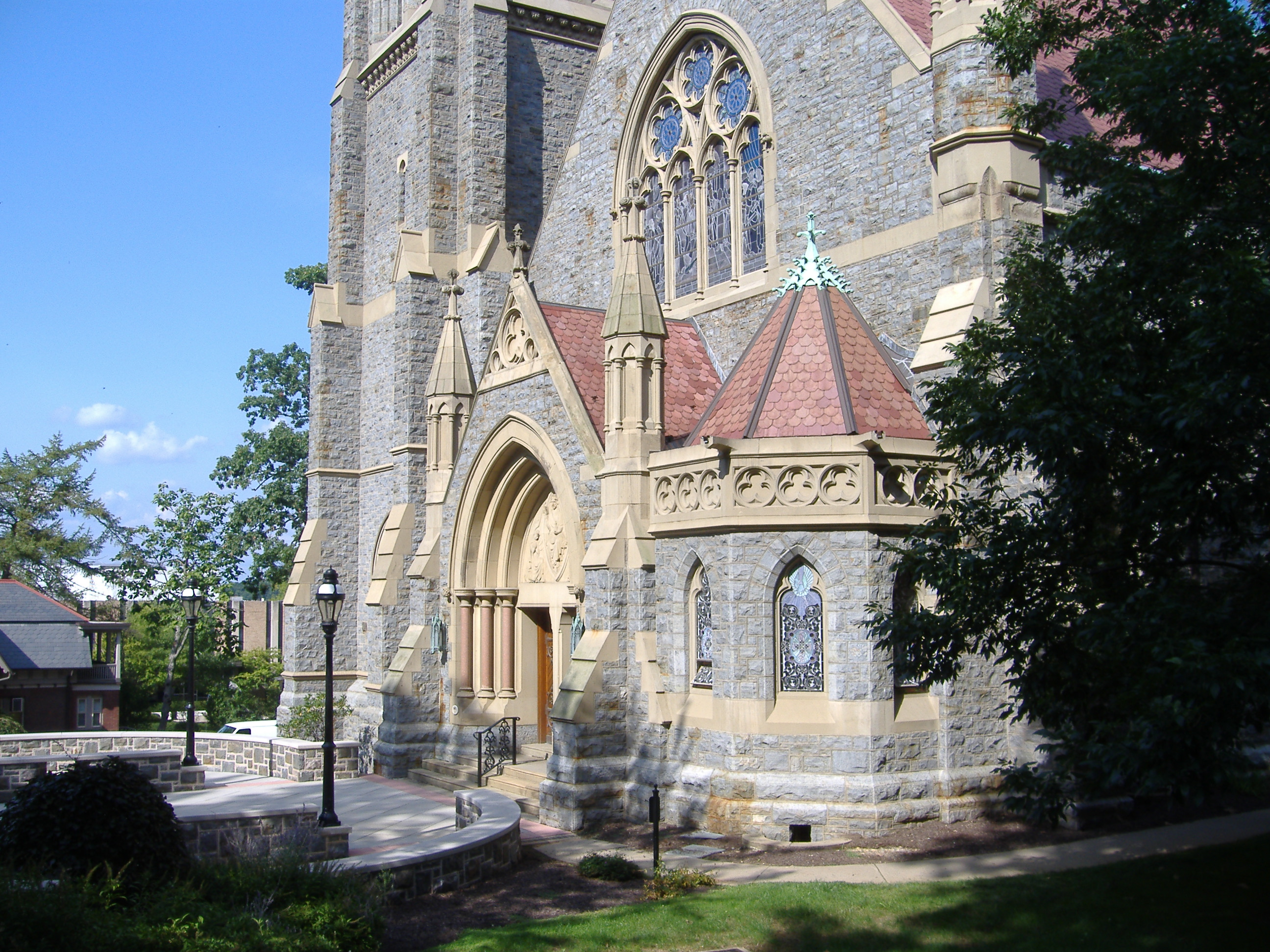
Packer Chapel Entrance

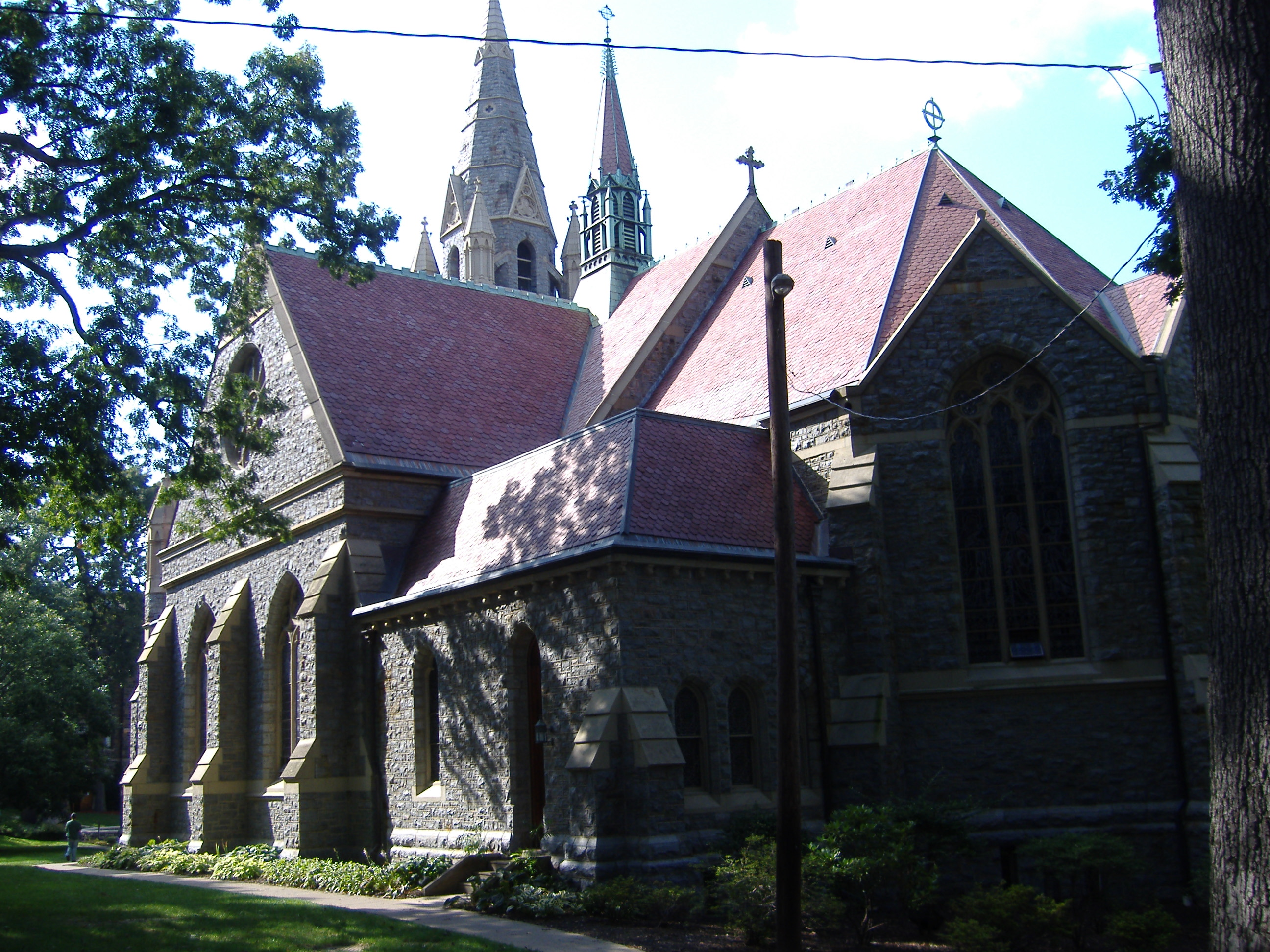
Packer Chapel Rear Detail

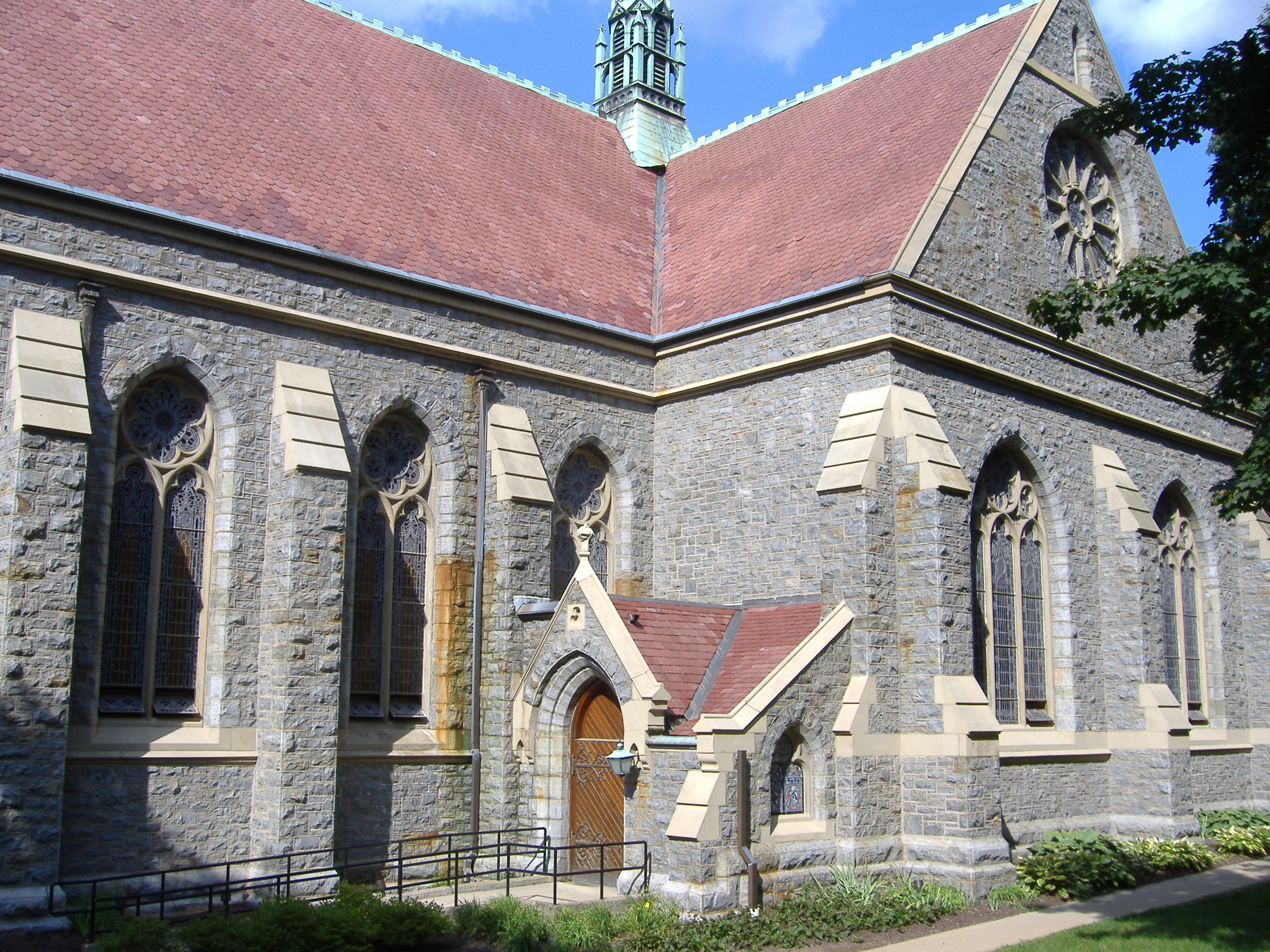
Packer Chapel Side Detail
