= Shannon MacVean-Brown =

American bishop

The Right Reverend Doctor Shannon MacVean-Brown
- Bishop of Vermont
- Church: Episcopal Church
- Diocese: Vermont
- Elected: May 19, 2019
- In office: 2019–present
- Predecessor: Thomas C. Ely

Orders
- Ordination: 2005
- Consecration: September 28, 2019 by Michael Curry

Personal details
- Denomination: Anglican
- Spouse: Phil
- Children: 2

Shannon MacVean-Brown is an American prelate of the Episcopal Church who is the eleventh and current Bishop of Vermont, since 2019.

== Biography ==
MacVean-Brown graduated with a Master of Divinity from Seabury-Western Theological Seminary in 2004 and has a Doctor of Ministry from Ecumenical Theological Seminary. She was ordained deacon in 2004 and priest in 2005 in the Diocese of Michigan.

Prior to her election, she was interim rector at St Thomas' Church in Franklin, Indiana. She was elected Bishop of Vermont on May 18, 2019 during a Special Electing Convention which took place in Burlington, Vermont. She was consecrated on September 28, 2019 at Ira Allen Chapel in Burlington by Presiding Bishop Michael Curry.
