= Benjamin M. Washburn =

American prelate

The Right Reverend Benjamin Martin Washburn D.D., S.T.D.
- Bishop of Newark
- Church: Episcopal Church
- Diocese: Newark
- In office: 1935–1958
- Predecessor: Wilson Reiff Stearly
- Successor: Leland Stark
- Previous post: Coadjutor Bishop of Newark (1932-1935)

Orders
- Ordination: May 18, 1913 by Arthur C. A. Hall
- Consecration: October 14, 1932 by James De Wolf Perry

Personal details
- Born: June 1, 1887 Bethel, Vermont, United States
- Died: October 16, 1966 (aged 79) Ridgefield, Connecticut, United States
- Buried: Holy Innocents Cemetery, New Jersey
- Denomination: Anglican
- Parents: Seth Monroe Washburn & Kate Strong Brooks
- Spouse: Henrietta Tracy de Selding
- Children: 1

Benjamin Martin Washburn (June 1, 1887 – October 16, 1966) was an American prelate who served as the fifth bishop of Newark in The Episcopal Church.

== Early life and education ==
Washburn was born on June 1, 1887, in Bethel, Vermont, United States. Son of Seth Monroe Washburn and Kate Strong Brooks. He studied at and graduated with a Bachelor of Arts in 1907. Later he studied at the General Theological Seminary and graduated with a Bachelor of Divinity in 1913. He was awarded a Doctor of Divinity from Dartmouth College in 1929, Kenyon College in 1949 and Hobart College in 1951. In 1933 he was awarded a Doctor of Sacred Theology from General Theological Seminary.

== Ordained ministry ==
He was ordained deacon in June 1912 in St Paul's Church in Burlington, Vermont, and a priest on May 18, 1913, both by Arthur C. A. Hall of Vermont. He served as curate of Grace Church in New York City from 1912 to 1915 after which he became vicar. In 1918 he became rector of St Paul's Church in Kansas City, Kansas. Between 1929 and 1932 he was the rector of Emmanuel Church in Boston.

== Bishop ==
Washburn was elected Coadjutor Bishop of Newark in 1932 and was consecrated on October 14, 1932, by Presiding Bishop James De Wolf Perry. In 1935 he succeeded as diocesan bishop where he remained till 1958. He died after a long illness on October 16, 1966, in Ridgefield, Connecticut.
