= Leland Stark =

American bishop

The Right Reverend Leland Stark D.D.
- Bishop of Newark
- Church: Episcopal Church
- Diocese: Newark
- In office: 1958–1973
- Predecessor: Benjamin Martin Washburn
- Successor: George Rath
- Previous post: Coadjutor Bishop of Newark (1953-1958)

Orders
- Ordination: December 18, 1935 by Stephen Keeler
- Consecration: June 9, 1953 by Henry Knox Sherrill

Personal details
- Born: September 5, 1907 Evanston, Illinois, United States
- Died: May 8, 1986 (aged 78) Montclair, New Jersey, United States
- Denomination: Anglican
- Parents: Gustav Knute Stark & Jennie Virginia Peterson
- Spouse: Aphilda W. Anderson (m. Sept. 10, 1935)
- Children: 2

Leland William Frederick Stark (September 5, 1907 – May 8, 1986) was sixth bishop of the Episcopal Diocese of Newark, serving from 1958 to 1974.

== Early life and education ==
Stark was born on September 5, 1907, in Evanston, Illinois, the son of the Reverend Gustav Knute Stark and Jennie Virginia Peterson. He was reared as a Lutheran however as he grew up he became an agnostic. He studied at the University of Minnesota and Gustavus Adolphus College from where he graduated with a Bachelor of Arts in 1932. He studied at Chicago Theological Seminary after which he continued his studies at Seabury-Western Theological Seminary and graduated with a Bachelor of Theology in 1935 and was awarded an honorary Doctor of Divinity in 1953.

== Priest ==
Stark was ordained deacon on June 18, 1935 by Bishop Frank McElwain of Minnesota and priest on December 18, 1935 by Bishop Stephen Keeler, Coadjutor of Minnesota. From 1935 to 1940 he served in a number of parishes in Minnesota until being appointed Dean of Calvary Cathedral in Sioux Falls, South Dakota in 1940. On October 10, 1948, he became rector of the Church of the Epiphany in Washington, D.C. In 1952 he served as deputy to the General Convention.

== Bishop ==
Stark was elected Coadjutor Bishop of Newark in 1953 and was consecrated on June 9 by Presiding Bishop Henry Knox Sherrill in Trinity Cathedral, Newark, New Jersey. He succeeded as diocesan in 1958. As bishop he was involved in international peace committees and hence had to travel to countries in Africa and to Vietnam.

In 1967, Stark was involved in a controversy with the Governor of New Jersey Richard J. Hughes for letting a national four day black power conference to take place in the Cathedral house of the diocese. He retired in 1973 and moved to Verona, New Jersey. He died on May 8, 1986, in Mountainside Hospital in Montclair, New Jersey.

== Family ==
Stark was married to Phyllis Anderson and together they had two sons.
