= Edwin Stevens Lines =

American Episcopal bishop (1845–1927)

The Right Reverend Edwin Stevens Lines D.D.
- Bishop of Newark
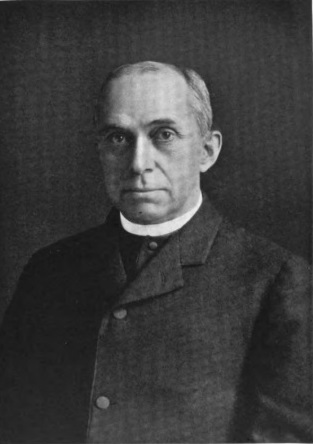
- Church: Episcopal Church
- Diocese: Newark
- Elected: June 15, 1903
- In office: 1903–1927
- Predecessor: Thomas A. Starkey
- Successor: Wilson Reiff Stearly

Orders
- Ordination: December 21, 1874 by John Williams
- Consecration: November 18, 1903 by Daniel S. Tuttle

Personal details
- Born: November 23, 1845 Naugatuck, Connecticut, United States
- Died: October 25, 1927 (aged 81) Newark, New Jersey, United States
- Buried: Evergreen Cemetery (New Haven, Connecticut)
- Denomination: Anglican
- Parents: Henry Willis Lines & Harriet Bunnell
- Spouse: Mary Louise Starr
- Children: 4

Edwin Stevens Lines (November 23, 1845 – October 25, 1927) was a bishop of the Episcopal Diocese of Newark, New Jersey.

== Biography ==
Lines was born in Naugatuck, Connecticut, on November 23, 1845, the son of Henry Willis Lines and Harriet Bunnell. He studied at Yale Divinity School between 1872 and 1873 and later graduated from Berkeley Divinity School in 1874.

== Ordained ministry ==
He was ordained deacon on May 24, 1874, in Middletown, Connecticut, and became rector of Christ Church in West Haven, Connecticut. He was ordained priest in the same church on December 21, 1874, and remained rector till 1879 when he became rector of St Paul's Church in New Haven, Connecticut.

== Bishop ==
Lines was elected on the fifth ballot as Bishop of Newark on June 17, 1903, and was consecrated on November 18, 1903, by Presiding Bishop Daniel S. Tuttle. He died in office on October 25, 1927, due to heart failure.

== Family ==
Lines married in Mary Louise Morehouse on May 4, 1880, and together had four children.
