= Cathedral Church of St. Paul (Burlington, Vermont) =

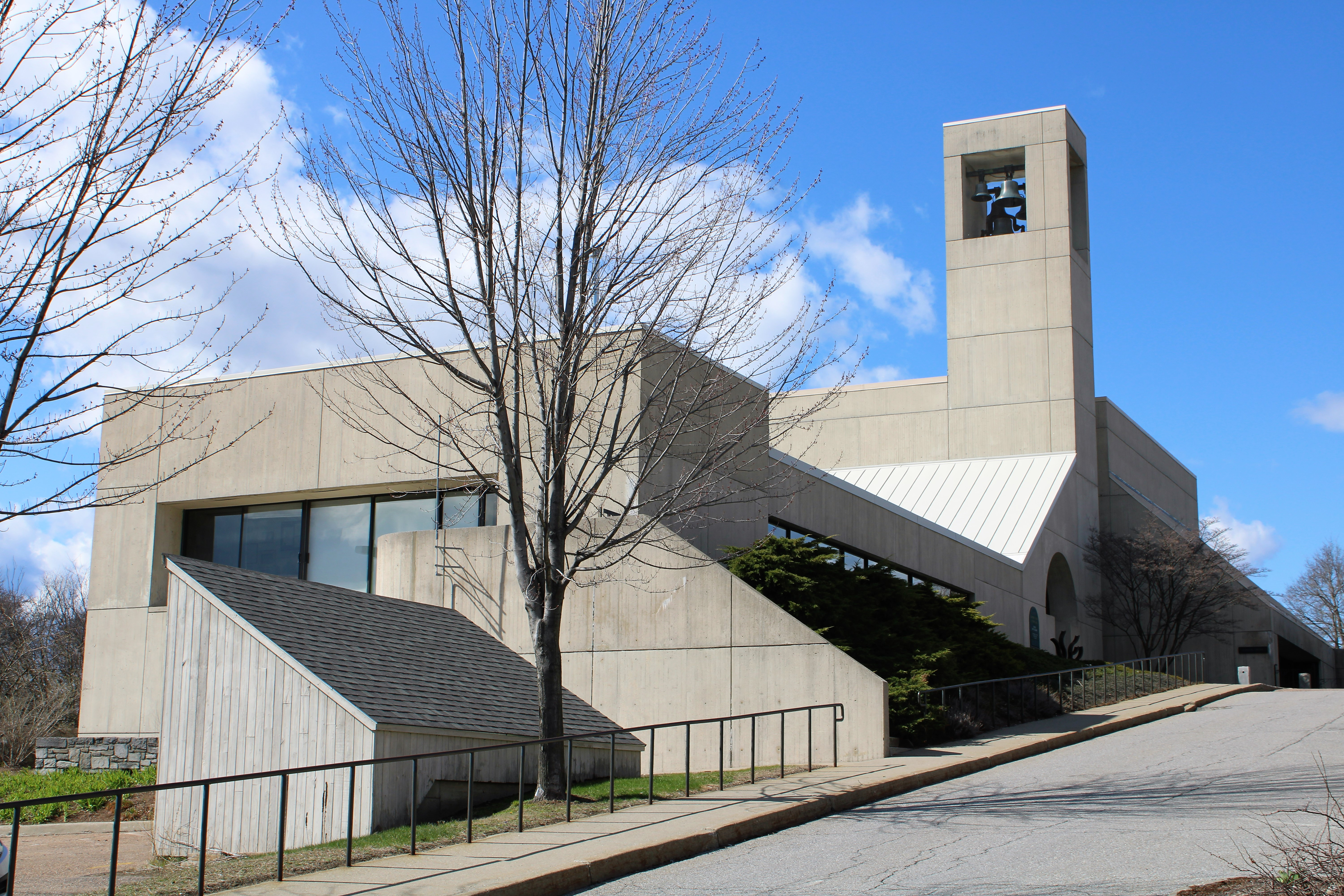
- Cathedral Church of St. Paul
- 44°28′47.44″N 73°13′6.27″W
- Location: 2 Cherry St. Burlington, Vermont
- Country: United States
- Denomination: Episcopal Church in the United States of America
- Website: www.stpaulscathedralvt.org

History
- Founded: 1830
- Consecrated: November 11, 1973

Architecture
- Architect: Burlington Associates
- Style: Modern

Specifications
- Materials: stressed concrete

Administration
- Diocese: Diocese of Vermont

Clergy
- Bishop: The Right Reverend Shannon MacVean-Brown
- Dean: The Very Rev. Greta Getlein

The Cathedral Church of St. Paul is an Episcopal cathedral located in Burlington, Vermont, United States. It is the seat of the Diocese of Vermont. The cathedral reported 390 members in 2025. Plate and pledge income for the congregation in 2025 was $349,109 with average Sunday attendance (ASA) of 117. This was a relative decrease from ASA of 191 reported in 2015.

== History ==
About 55 Episcopalians were present in a Burlington hotel when St. Paul's Church was organized in 1830. The first service was held in the courthouse on June 12, 1831. A stone, Gothic Revival church building was dedicated the following year. The structure was enlarged three times (1851, 1866, 1910) as the congregation grew. The 1910 renovation followed a fire. At the Diocesan Convention of 1965 St. Paul's was designated as the cathedral church of the diocese. It was formally elevated on May 6, 1966.

The old St. Paul's Cathedral was destroyed by a fire on February 15, 1971. It was sparked by an electrical malfunction in the basement. The City of Burlington was in the midst of a massive urban renewal project at the time. They offered to exchange the land on which the old church had stood for a new plot of land overlooking Lake Champlain downtown. Burlington Associates was chosen to design the new cathedral; architects Thomas Cullins and William Henderson led the project. It was completed in 1973 and consecrated on November 11, 1973.

== Architecture ==
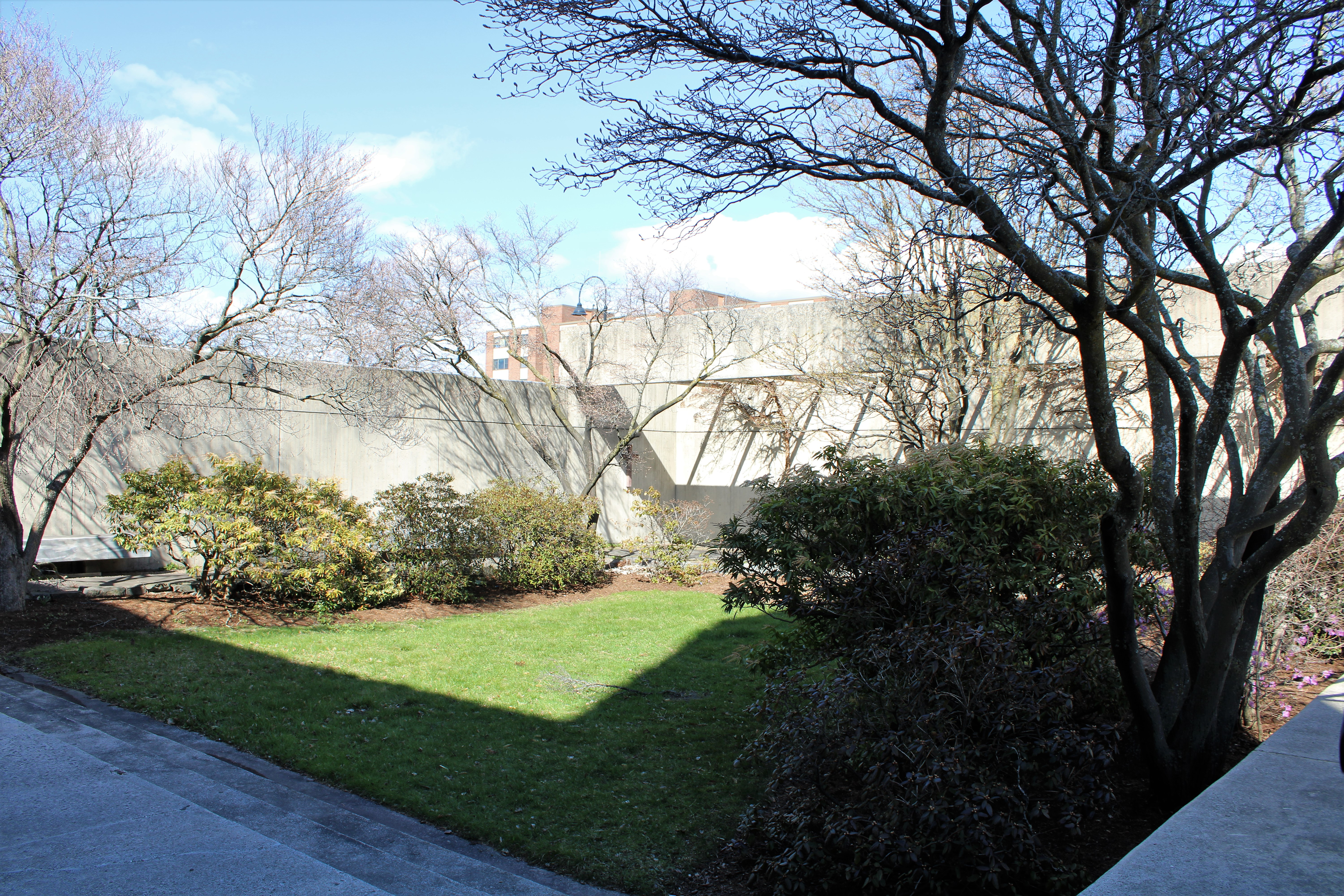
Memorial Garden

A good example of Brutalist architecture, St. Paul's Cathedral is built of exposed poured-in-place reinforced concrete, featuring a coffered sanctuary, textured surfaces from vertical formwork, and carefully proportioned and patterned joints. The interior finishes include white oak furnishings and acoustic paneling and a slate floor. It is naturally lit from the skylights and a large curtain wall, which provides a view of Lake Champlain and the Adirondacks. The campanile holds eight bells from old St. Paul's. They were cast in 1895 by the Clinton H. Meneely Bell Company of Troy, New York. The bells were refurbished after the fire and rehung in the new bell tower. A ninth bell cracked in the fire and is now at the foot of the tower, adjacent to the Memorial Garden gate. The Memorial Garden is located to the east of the church. The ashes of parish members and friends of St. Paul's are buried there. It is enclosed with stonework that incorporates stones from old St. Paul's.

== See also ==
- List of the Episcopal cathedrals of the United States
- List of cathedrals in the United States
