= Samuel B. Booth =

American bishop

The Right Reverend Samuel Babcock Booth D.D.
- Bishop of Vermont
- Church: Episcopal Church
- See: Vermont
- In office: 1929–1935
- Predecessor: Arthur C. A. Hall
- Successor: Vedder Van Dyck
- Previous post: Coadjutor Bishop of Vermont (1925-1929)

Orders
- Ordination: May 28, 1911 by James Bowen Funsten
- Consecration: February 17, 1925 by Arthur C. A. Hall

Personal details
- Born: October 29, 1883 Philadelphia, Pennsylvania, United States
- Died: June 17, 1935 (aged 51) Bennington, Vermont, United States
- Buried: Chapel of the Transfiguration, Burlington, Vermont
- Denomination: Anglican
- Parents: Henry Driver Booth & Mary Bourne Babcock
- Spouse: Anna Peck
- Children: 7
- Education: Harvard University

Samuel Babcock Booth (October 29, 1883 – June 17, 1935) was fourth bishop of the Episcopal Diocese of Vermont.

== Biography ==
He was born in Philadelphia to Henry Driver Booth and Mary Bourne Babcock Booth. Booth attended the William Penn Charter School and graduated from Harvard College in 1906 and the Virginia Theological Seminary in 1911. He was ordained deacon in June 1910 and priest in 1911, serving as a missionary in Idaho from 1910 to 1914. He was rector of St. Luke's Church, Kensington, Philadelphia (1914-1918), chaplain to an American Red Cross evacuation hospital in France, and superintendent of missions, Bucks County, Pennsylvania, before consecration as bishop coadjutor of Vermont on February 17, 1925. He succeeded Arthur C. A. Hall as diocesan bishop on February 26, 1930.

== Personal and family life ==
He was baptized at St. Timothy's Church, Roxborough, Pennsylvania on 24 Feb 1884.

He married Anna Peck (1885-1981) in September 1910 at St. John's, Georgetown, Washington, D.C.
