= William Henry Augustus Bissell =

American bishop

The Right Reverend William Henry Augustus Bissell D.D.
- Bishop of Vermont
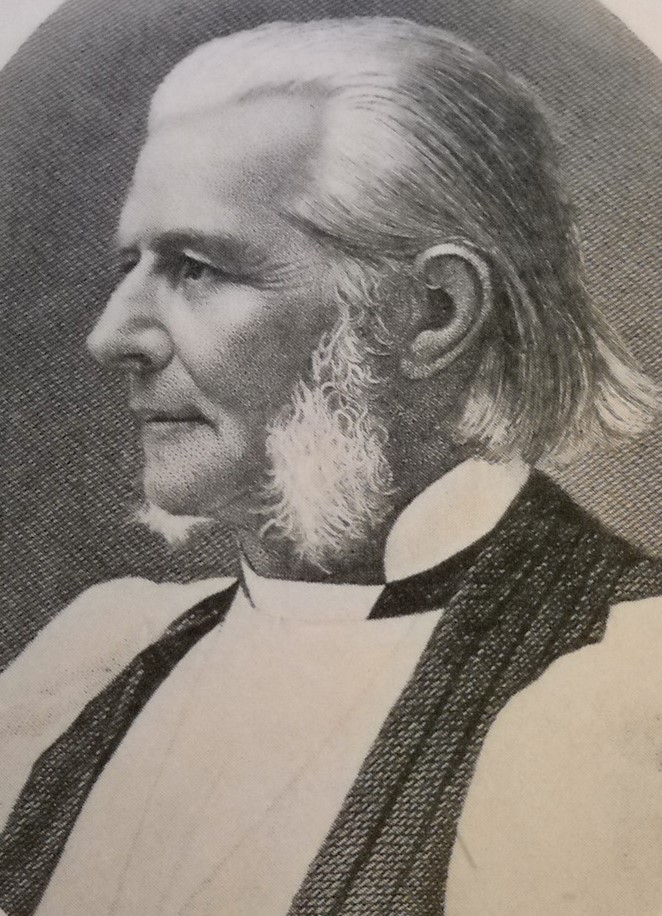
- Church: Episcopal Church
- See: Vermont
- Elected: March 11, 1868
- In office: 1868–1893
- Predecessor: John Henry Hopkins
- Successor: Arthur C. A. Hall

Orders
- Ordination: August 2, 1840 by Benjamin T. Onderdonk
- Consecration: June 3, 1868 by Samuel A. McCoskry

Personal details
- Born: November 10, 1814 Randolph, Vermont, United States
- Died: May 14, 1893 (aged 78) Burlington, Vermont, United States
- Buried: Lake View Cemetery
- Denomination: Anglican
- Parents: Ezekiel Bissell & Elizabeth Washburn Bissell
- Spouse: Martha Cotton Moulton
- Children: 3

William Henry Augustus Bissell (November 10, 1814 - May 14, 1893) was the second bishop of Vermont in the Episcopal Church in the United States of America.

== Education ==
Bissell was born on November 10, 1814, in Randolph, Vermont, the son of Ezekiel Bissell and Elizabeth Washburn. He graduated from the University of Vermont in 1836 and commenced his teaching career in Detroit. He also studied theology at Vermont Episcopal Institute.

== Ordination ==
Bissell was ordained deacon on September 29, 1839, by Bishop Benjamin T. Onderdonk of New York. He was ordained a priest a year later on August 2 by the same bishop. Bissell served as assistant of Christ Church in Troy, New York. In 1941 he was appointed rector of Trinity Church in Watervliet, New York, a post he held until 1845 when he became rector of Grace Church in Lyons, New York. In 1848 he was appointed rector of Trinity Church in Geneva, New York.

== Episcopacy ==
Bissell was elected Bishop of Vermont in 1868 and consecrated bishop on June 3, 1868, by Samuel A. McCoskry Bishop of Michigan and co-consecrated by John Williams of Connecticut, Horatio Potter of New York, Arthur Cleveland Coxe of Western New York and Henry A. Neely of Maine. Bissell died on May 14, 1893, in Burlington, Vermont.

== Personal life ==
Bissell married Martha Cotton Moulton on August 25, 1838, and had four children.
