= Arthur C. A. Hall =

English bishop

The Right Reverend Arthur C. A. Hall S.S.J.E
- Bishop of Vermont
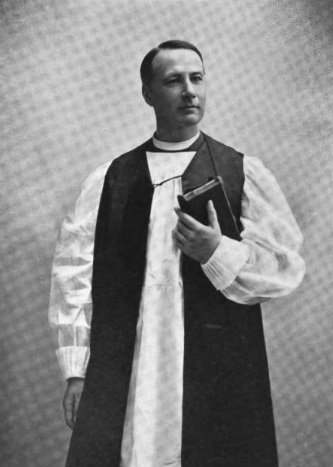
- Province: Episcopal Church
- Diocese: Vermont
- Elected: August 30, 1893
- In office: 1894–1930
- Predecessor: William H. A. Bissell
- Successor: Samuel B. Booth

Orders
- Ordination: December 21, 1871 by John Mackarness
- Consecration: February 2, 1894 by Henry A. Neely

Personal details
- Born: April 12, 1847 Binfield, Berkshire, England
- Died: February 26, 1930 (aged 82) Burlington, Vermont, United States
- Buried: Rock Point Cemetery at Burlington
- Denomination: Anglican
- Education: Christ Church, Oxford
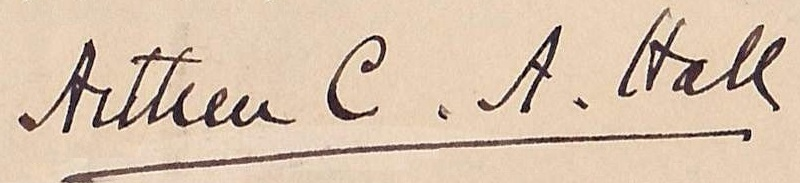
- Signature

Arthur Crawshay Alliston Hall (April 12, 1847 - February 26, 1930) was the third bishop of Vermont in The Episcopal Church. He combined "a thoroughly consecrated character, a commanding, winning personality, a very quick and clear and wise mind, a deeply spiritual purpose and outlook, a very thorough scholarship, a loving heart, alive with a sense of humor, which never suggested the slightest touch of irreverence."

== Early life and education ==
Hall was born near Reading on April 12, 1847. He was the son of a retired army officer.

After completing his early education, Hall received his B.A. in 1869 and his M.A. in 1872 at Christ Church, Oxford. Immediately after graduation, he joined the Society of St. John the Evangelist.

== Ministry as a priest ==
Hall was ordained deacon on December 18, 1870, and priest on December 21, 1871. In 1873, he was sent to Boston, Massachusetts, where he "soon gained a reputation as an excellent preacher and retreat conductor."

In 1874, Hall was sent to America. For a year, he was in charge of a House of the Society at Bridgeport, Connecticut. During 1874 to 1891, he became priest-in-charge at the Church of the Society on Bowdoin Street in Boston. He did preaching and pastoral work in Boston. He also went about the country giving retreats, quiet days, and missions. He gained a reputation as one of the best preachers in the United States.

From 1882 until 1891, when Hall was recalled by the SSJE to England, he served the Church of St. John the Evangelist, Boston. Hall became a naturalized American citizen in 1885. Hall's recall by the SSJE to England in the fall of 1891 was due partly on account of his action with regard to the election of Phillips Brooks as Bishop of Massachusetts. and partly because of differences of opinion as to the policy of the Society in America. Hall and Brooks were warm friends. The other part of the reason for the recall was because of differences of opinion as to the policy of the Society in America. However, Hall did not vote for Brooks. He merely signed the customary testimonial to his election and as a member of the Standing Committee of the Diocese voted that the election be confirmed. Hall said that he had vowed "obedience" as one of his three vows when he joined the Society, and whatever he might think of the wisdom or unwisdom of his superior, obey he would and did. Hall remained in England until he was elected bishop of Vermont.

== Bishop of Vermont ==
On August 30, 1893, when Hall was elected Bishop of Vermont, the Cowley Fathers released him from all obligations to their Society. Having cut all ties with the Cowley Fathers, Hall was consecrated Fourth Bishop of Vermont in the St. Paul's Church, Burlington on February 2, 1894. He served in that capacity until his death.

On April 24, 1929, a diocesan memorial service for Bishop Charles Brent was held in St. Paul's Cathedral, Buffalo, with Hall as preacher.

== Death ==
Hall, the bishop of Vermont and former member of the Society of Saint John the Evangelist, died on February 26, 1930, at Burlington, Vermont, in the 83rd year of his life and the 53rd year of his religious profession. He died having outlived two coadjutor bishops elected to succeed him. He is buried in Rock Point Cemetery at Burlington, Vermont.

After his death, his rochet was put on him with his episcopal ring and his pectoral cross. He was placed in his beautiful private chapel, built by grateful English friends to whom he had ministered.

== Works ==
- Meditations on the Creed (1883).
- Confirmation.
- Christ's Temptation and Ours (Longmans, Green, and Company, 1896).
- Words from & to the Cross.
- The Example of the Passion: Five Meditations (1882).
- Meditations on the Lord's Prayer (1884).
- The Relations of Faith and Life.
- Christ's Temptation and Ours (1896).
