= Granville Gaylord Bennett =

Granville Gaylord Bennett may refer to:

- Granville G. Bennett (1833–1910), American lawyer, judge and delegate to the U.S. House of Representatives
- Granville Gaylord Bennett (bishop) (1883–1975), American Episcopal bishop
