= Ecclesiastical provinces and dioceses of the Episcopal Church =

The Episcopal Church (TEC) is governed by a General Convention and consists of 107 dioceses: 95 dioceses in the United States proper, plus ten dioceses in other countries or outlying U.S. territories, the diocese of Convocation of Episcopal Churches in Europe, and a diocese for Armed Services and Federal Ministries.

A diocese, which is led by a bishop, includes all the parishes and missions within its borders, which usually correspond to a state or a portion of a state. Some dioceses includes portions of more than one state. For example, the Diocese of Washington includes the District of Columbia and part of Maryland; the Diocese of Spokane also includes parishes in Idaho.

== Overview ==
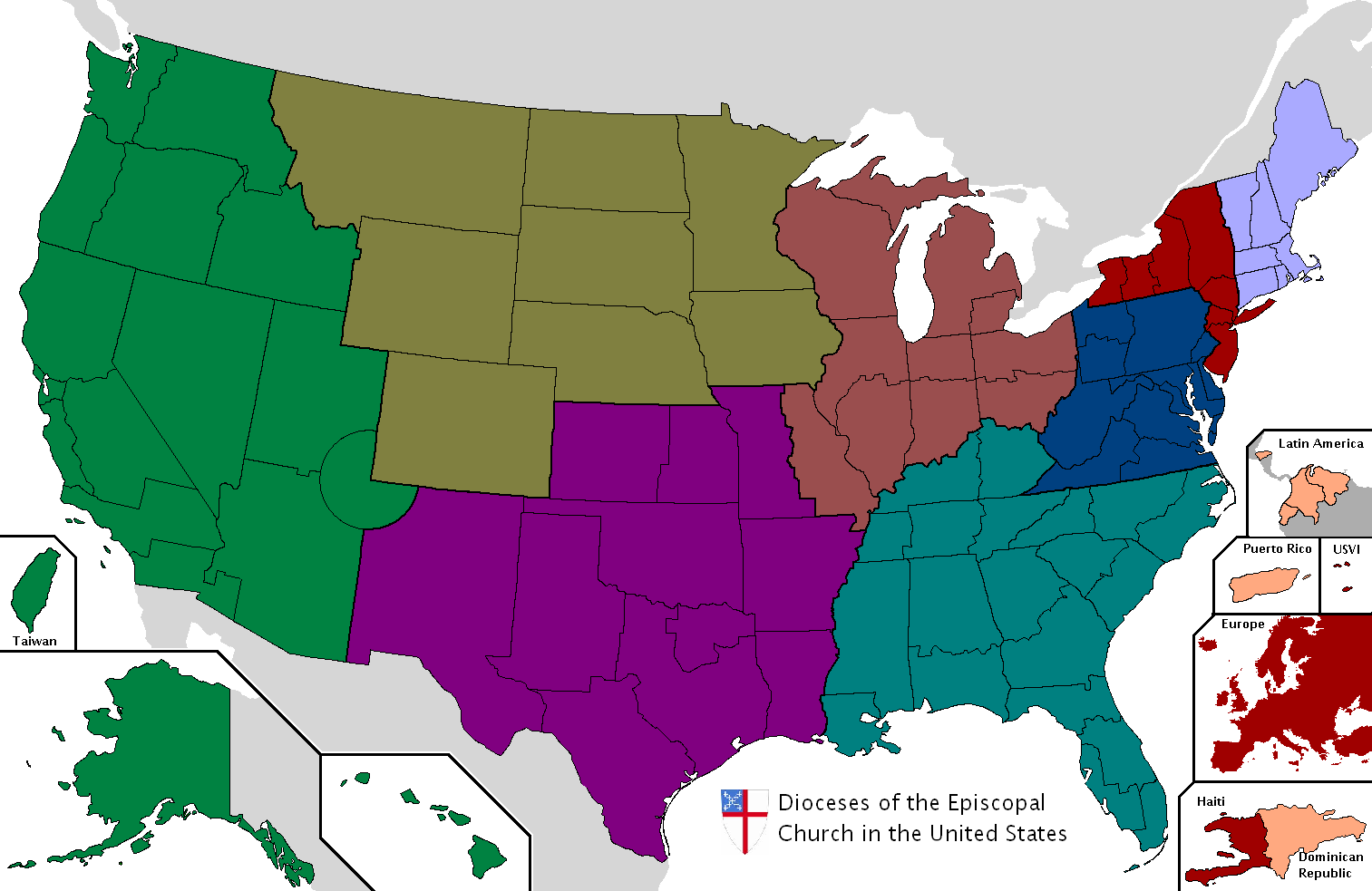
Map of dioceses of the Episcopal Church, colored by province: Province I, New England, 124,481 Province II, Atlantic, 264,640 Province III, Washington, 223,965 / Province IV, Sewanee, 372,412 Province V, Midwest, 91,150 Province VI, Northwest, 62,602 / Province VII, Southwest, 183,968 Province VIII, Pacific, 160,344 Province IX, Latin America, 43,962

The naming convention for the domestic dioceses, for the most part, is after the state in which they are located or a portion of that state (for example, Northern Michigan or West Texas).

Usually (though not always), in a state where there is more than one diocese, the area where the Episcopal Church (or Church of England before the American Revolution) started in that state is the diocese that bears the name of that state. For example, the Church of England's first presence in what is now Georgia was in Savannah, hence the Diocese of Georgia is based in Savannah.

There are, however, many dioceses named for their see city or another city in the diocese. A few are named for a river, island, valley or other geographical feature. The list below includes the see city in parentheses if different from the name of the diocese or unclear from its name.

The see city usually has a cathedral, often the oldest parish in that city, but some dioceses do not have a cathedral. The dioceses of Iowa, Minnesota, and Susquehanna each have two cathedrals, while the Diocese of Wisconsin has three. Occasionally the diocesan offices and the cathedral are in separate cities.

=== Provinces ===
The dioceses are grouped into nine provinces, the first eight of which mainly correspond to regions of the U.S. Province IX is composed of dioceses in Latin America. Province II and Province VIII also include dioceses outside of the United States.

Unlike in many churches of the Anglican Communion, in which provinces are led by a primate or presiding bishop from the clergy, provinces of the Episcopal Church are led by lay executive directors or presidents. Decisions are made at each province's Synod of the Province, consisting of a House of Bishops and House of Deputies. Lay and clergy Deputies are elected, two from each diocese.

Provinces of the Episcopal Church are not themselves provinces of the Anglican Communion, as the Episcopal Church itself is one such province of the Communion.

=== List of provinces and their dioceses ===
Province	Name	Diocese	See city	Founded	Parishes and missions (2023)	Active baptized members (2023)	Average worship attendance (2025)	Diocese Map
Province I	Province of New England	Diocese of Connecticut	Hartford	1785	152	36,763	8,036	
Province I	Province of New England	Diocese of Maine	Portland, ME	1820	57	8,400	2,732	
Province I	Province of New England	Diocese of Massachusetts	Boston	1784	162	42,510	9,709	
Province I	Province of New England	Diocese of New Hampshire	Concord	1832	41	9,279	2,445	
Province I	Province of New England	Diocese of Rhode Island	Providence	1790	52	12,781	3,268	
Province I	Province of New England	Diocese of Vermont	Burlington	1832	45	4,045	1,330	
Province I	Province of New England	Diocese of Western Massachusetts	Springfield, MA	1901	50	10,844	2,346	
Province II	The International Atlantic Province or Province of New York and New Jersey	Diocese of Albany	Albany	1868	102	9,121	3,258	
Province II	The International Atlantic Province or Province of New York and New Jersey	Diocese of Central New York	Syracuse	1868	78	8,534	2,368	
Province II	The International Atlantic Province or Province of New York and New Jersey	Convocation of Episcopal Churches in Europe	Paris	1859	20	2,435	765	
Province II	The International Atlantic Province or Province of New York and New Jersey	Diocese of Cuba	Havana	1901	44	1,931	1,223	
Province II	The International Atlantic Province or Province of New York and New Jersey	Diocese of Haiti	Port-au-Prince	1861	120	98,403	N/A	
Province II	The International Atlantic Province or Province of New York and New Jersey	Diocese of Long Island	Garden City	1868	126	36,349	8,445	
Province II	The International Atlantic Province or Province of New York and New Jersey	Diocese of New Jersey	Trenton	1785	136	30,423	7,462	
Province II	The International Atlantic Province or Province of New York and New Jersey	Diocese of New York	New York City	1787	191	41,888	10,813	
Province II	The International Atlantic Province or Province of New York and New Jersey	Diocese of Newark	Newark	1874	93	18,245	4,364	
Province II	The International Atlantic Province or Province of New York and New Jersey	Diocese of Puerto Rico	San Juan	1920	56	3,199	1,732	
Province II	The International Atlantic Province or Province of New York and New Jersey	Diocese of Rochester	Rochester	1931	48	6,529	2,029	
Province II	The International Atlantic Province or Province of New York and New Jersey	Diocese of the Virgin Islands	Charlotte Amalie	1985	13	1,628	812	
Province II	The International Atlantic Province or Province of New York and New Jersey	Diocese of Western New York	Buffalo	1839	56	6,014	1,660	
Province III	Province of Washington	Diocese of Delaware	Wilmington	1785	32	6,913	2,444	
Province III	Province of Washington	Diocese of Easton	Easton	1888	38	6,858	1,558	
Province III	Province of Washington	Diocese of Maryland	Baltimore	1780	100	25,905	6,302	
Province III	Province of Washington	Diocese of Northwestern Pennsylvania	Erie	1910	32	2,677	1,008	
Province III	Province of Washington	Diocese of Pennsylvania	Philadelphia	1784	133	32,225	8,439	
Province III	Province of Washington	Diocese of Pittsburgh	Pittsburgh	1865	33	8,538	1,747	
Province III	Province of Washington	Diocese of Southern Virginia	Newport News	1892	100	19,534	6,356	
Province III	Province of Washington	Diocese of Southwestern Virginia	Roanoke	1919	50	8,338	2,882	
Province III	Province of Washington	Diocese of the Susquehanna (Note: On January 1, 2026, the Diocese of Bethlehem and the Diocese of Central Pennsylvania reunified; statistics reflect the combined dioceses.)	Bethlehem and Harrisburg	2026	117	15,402	4,814	
Province III	Province of Washington	Diocese of Virginia	Richmond (offices); Orkney Springs (cathedral shrine)	1785	179	61,591	15,507	
Province III	Province of Washington	Diocese of Washington	Washington, D.C.	1895	85	30,741	9,247	
Province III	Province of Washington	Diocese of West Virginia	Charleston, WV	1877	60	5,377	1,747	
Province IV	Province of Sewanee	Diocese of Alabama	Birmingham	1844	88	29,180	7,630	
Province IV	Province of Sewanee	Diocese of Atlanta	Atlanta	1907	91	43,211	10,640	
Province IV	Province of Sewanee	Diocese of Central Florida	Orlando	1969	82	22,131	9,328	
Province IV	Province of Sewanee	Diocese of the Central Gulf Coast	Pensacola (offices); Mobile (cathedral)	1970	61	16,803	4,291	
Province IV	Province of Sewanee	Diocese of East Carolina	Kinston	1863	67	14,133	4,342	
Province IV	Province of Sewanee	Diocese of East Tennessee	Knoxville	1985	46	12,969	4,054	
Province IV	Province of Sewanee	Diocese of Florida	Jacksonville	1838	66	22,884	6,523	
Province IV	Province of Sewanee	Diocese of Georgia	Savannah	1823	67	12,038	3,845	
Province IV	Province of Sewanee	Diocese of Kentucky	Louisville	1832	32	6,409	1,952	
Province IV	Province of Sewanee	Diocese of Lexington	Lexington	1896	34	6,186	2,220	
Province IV	Province of Sewanee	Diocese of Louisiana	New Orleans	1838	47	13,660	3,304	
Province IV	Province of Sewanee	Diocese of Mississippi	Jackson, MS	1850	80	16,981	4,623	
Province IV	Province of Sewanee	Diocese of North Carolina	Raleigh	1823	106	41,835	10,858	
Province IV	Province of Sewanee	Diocese of South Carolina	Charleston, SC	1785	31	7,995	2,497	
Province IV	Province of Sewanee	Diocese of Southeast Florida	Miami	1969	74	25,810	7,230	
Province IV	Province of Sewanee	Diocese of Southwest Florida	Parrish (offices); St. Petersburg (cathedral)	1969	78	24,046	7,583	
Province IV	Province of Sewanee	Diocese of Tennessee	Nashville	1834	45	15,460	4,490	
Province IV	Province of Sewanee	Diocese of Upper South Carolina	Columbia	1922	59	21,422	5,312	
Province IV	Province of Sewanee	Diocese of West Tennessee	Memphis	1985	29	6,163	2,044	
Province IV	Province of Sewanee	Diocese of Western North Carolina	Asheville	1922	60	13,152	4,982	
Province V	Province of the Midwest	Diocese of Chicago	Chicago	1823	120	25,645	7,289	
Province V	Province of the Midwest	Diocese of the Great Lakes	Saginaw	2024	97 (Note: Figures represent the combined totals of the former Dioceses of Eastern and Western Michigan, which joined in 2024 to form the Diocese of the Great Lakes.)	9,802	3,706	
Province V	Province of the Midwest	Diocese of Indianapolis	Indianapolis	1849	48	7,711	2,831	
Province V	Province of the Midwest	Diocese of Michigan	Detroit	1832	70	13,311	4,031	
Province V	Province of the Midwest	Diocese of Missouri	St. Louis	1841	39	8,745	2,340	
Province V	Province of the Midwest	Diocese of Northern Indiana	South Bend	1888	31	2,963	1,110	
Province V	Province of the Midwest	Diocese of Northern Michigan	Marquette	1895	21	975	333	
Province V	Province of the Midwest	Diocese of Ohio	Cleveland	1818	80	13,921	3,897	
Province V	Province of the Midwest	Diocese of Southern Ohio	Cincinnati	1875	71	14,818	4,742	
Province V	Province of the Midwest	Diocese of Springfield	Springfield, IL	1877	33	3,098	1,138	
Province V	Province of the Midwest	Diocese of Wisconsin	Eau Claire, Fond Du Lac, Milwaukee	1835	99 (Note: Figures represent the combined totals of the former Dioceses of Eau Claire and Fond du Lac, which merged into the Diocese of Milwaukee in 2024 to form a reunified Diocese of Wisconsin.)	10,535	4,039	
Province VI	Province of the Northwest	Diocese of Colorado	Denver	1875	93	19,887	6,921	
Province VI	Province of the Northwest	Diocese of Iowa	Des Moines (offices, one cathedral); Davenport (cathedral)	1854	58	4,713	1,620	
Province VI	Province of the Northwest	Episcopal Church in Minnesota	Minneapolis (offices, one cathedral); Faribault (cathedral)	1859	89	14,656	3,583	
Province VI	Province of the Northwest	Diocese of Montana	Helena	1904	32	3,367	1,000	
Province VI	Province of the Northwest	Diocese of Nebraska	Omaha	1865	50	5,867	1,840	
Province VI	Province of the Northwest	Diocese of North Dakota	Fargo	1883	19	2,148	430	
Province VI	Province of the Northwest	Diocese of South Dakota	Sioux Falls	1971	77	6,301	1,459	
Province VI	Province of the Northwest	Diocese of Wyoming	Casper (offices); Laramie (cathedral)	1909	45	5,670	1,382	
Province VII	Province of the Southwest	Diocese of Arkansas	Little Rock	1869	55	12,956	3,363	
Province VII	Province of the Southwest	Diocese of Dallas	Dallas	1895	61	27,214	8,161	
Province VII	Province of the Southwest	Diocese of Kansas	Topeka	1864	44	6,826	2,116	
Province VII	Province of the Southwest	Diocese of Northwest Texas	Lubbock	1958	25	4,788	1,395	
Province VII	Province of the Southwest	Diocese of Oklahoma	Oklahoma City	1937	64	13,576	4,388	
Province VII	Province of the Southwest	Diocese of the Rio Grande	Albuquerque	1881	48	9,764	2,893	
Province VII	Province of the Southwest	Diocese of Texas	Houston	1849	165	72,268	18,740	
Province VII	Province of the Southwest	Diocese of West Missouri	Kansas City, MO	1890	47	8,624	2,344	
Province VII	Province of the Southwest	Diocese of West Texas	San Antonio	1874	86	19,251	7,175	
Province VII	Province of the Southwest	Diocese of Western Kansas	Salina	1971	21	1,173	404	
Province VII	Province of the Southwest	Diocese of Western Louisiana	Pineville (offices); Shreveport (cathedral)	1979	42	7,744	2,117	
Province VIII	Province of the Pacific	Diocese of Alaska	Fairbanks	1971	46	4,794	748	
Province VIII	Province of the Pacific	Diocese of Arizona	Phoenix	1959	58	17,175	5,386	
Province VIII	Province of the Pacific	Diocese of California	San Francisco	1857	74	17,175	4,707	
Province VIII	Province of the Pacific	Diocese of Eastern Oregon	The Dalles	1970	20	1,675	644	
Province VIII	Province of the Pacific	Diocese of El Camino Real	Salinas (offices); San Jose (cathedral)	1980	40	5,760	2,003	
Province VIII	Province of the Pacific	Diocese of Hawaii	Honolulu	1966	37 (Note: Figures include the 2022 statistics reported by the Episcopal Church in Micronesia, which was merged into the Diocese of Hawaii by General Convention in 2024.)	6,019	2,100	
Province VIII	Province of the Pacific	Diocese of Idaho	Boise	1867	27	3,297	961	
Province VIII	Province of the Pacific	Diocese of Los Angeles	Los Angeles (diocesan seat in Echo Park neighborhood; pro-cathedral in downtown L.A.)	1895	128	39,677	7,908	
Province VIII	Province of the Pacific	Missionary Diocese of Navajoland	Farmington	1978	10	800	112	
Province VIII	Province of the Pacific	Diocese of Nevada	Las Vegas	1903	29	3,983	1,570	
Province VIII	Province of the Pacific	Diocese of Northern California	Sacramento	1910	63	9,727	3,434	
Province VIII	Province of the Pacific	Diocese of Olympia	Seattle	1910	90	18,356	6,463	
Province VIII	Province of the Pacific	Diocese of Oregon	Portland, OR	1854	67	11,600	3,900	
Province VIII	Province of the Pacific	Diocese of San Diego	San Diego	1973	41	9,781	3,676	
Province VIII	Province of the Pacific	Diocese of San Joaquin	Fresno	1961	19	1,958	676	
Province VIII	Province of the Pacific	Diocese of Spokane	Spokane	1892	33	3,385	1,245	
Province VIII	Province of the Pacific	Diocese of Taiwan	Taipei	1954	15	1,216	844	
Province VIII	Province of the Pacific	Diocese of Utah	Salt Lake City	1867	22	3,966	1,244	
Province IX	Province of Latin America	Diocese of Colombia	Bogotá	1964	32	2,390	1,167	
Province IX	Province of Latin America	Diocese of the Dominican Republic	Santo Domingo	1960	65	4,357	1,992	
Province IX	Province of Latin America	Diocese of Central Ecuador	Quito	1970	11	676	435	
Province IX	Province of Latin America	Diocese of Litoral Ecuador	Guayaquil	1988	26	7,825	952	
Province IX	Province of Latin America	Diocese of Honduras	San Pedro Sula	1978	110	27,789	3,422	
Province IX	Province of Latin America	Diocese of Venezuela	Caracas	1972	17	925	29	

== Former provinces and dioceses ==
- Diocese of Central America, now an autonomous province of the Anglican Communion
- Diocese of Central Pennsylvania (1904–2025, reunited with Diocese of Bethlehem)
- Diocese of Duluth (1907–1944, reunited with Diocese of Minnesota)
- Eastern Diocese (1811–1843, split into the dioceses of Massachusetts, Vermont, New Hampshire, Maine, and Rhode Island)
- Diocese of Eastern Michigan (1994-2024, juncture to form the Diocese of the Great Lakes)
- Diocese of Eau Claire (1929–2024, reunited with Diocese of Wisconsin)
- Diocese of Fond du Lac (1875–2024, reunited with Diocese of Wisconsin)
- Episcopal Church in North Texas (1983-2022, reunited with Diocese of Texas)
- Diocese of Mexico (1973–1985, now an autonomous province of the Anglican Communion)
- Diocese of the Philippines (1990, now autonomous province)
- Diocese of Quincy (1877–2013, merged with the diocese of Chicago following a schism)
- Diocese of South Florida (1922–1969, divided into dioceses of Central Florida, Southwest Florida, and Southeast Florida)
- Diocese of Western Colorado (1892–1898, 1907–1919, merged into Diocese of Colorado)
- Diocese of Western Michigan (1874-2024, juncture to form the Diocese of the Great Lakes)
- Missionary District of Western Nebraska (1889–1943, merged into diocese of Nebraska)
- Missionary District of Eastern Oklahoma (1911–1918, merged into diocese of Oklahoma)

== Military diocese ==
- Episcopal Diocese of the Armed Services and Federal Ministries

== Dioceses no longer in existence ==
- Duluth reunited with Minnesota in 1943.
- Eastern Diocese comprised all of New England except Connecticut. By 1843, Vermont, New Hampshire, Maine and Rhode Island had their own dioceses and the Eastern Diocese became Massachusetts
- Analogously, the Episcopal Diocese of Illinois formerly comprised all of Illinois. In 1877, the diocese was divided into three parts, with the Episcopal Diocese of Chicago assuming the legal succession of the former statewide diocese, and the Episcopal Diocese of Springfield and the Episcopal Diocese of Quincy becoming independent. Quincy reunited with Chicago in 2013.
- South Florida see Central Florida, Southeast Florida and Southwest Florida
- The Platte, renamed Laramie, Kearney, and Western Nebraska. In 1943 recombined with Nebraska
- Western Colorado reunited with Colorado in 1919.
- Episcopal Church in North Texas reunited with Episcopal Diocese of Texas in 2022.
- Episcopal Church in Micronesia united with Episcopal Diocese of Hawaii in 2024.

== Formerly missionary districts ==
The following were founded as missionary districts of the Episcopal Church but are now full, independent Provinces of the Anglican Communion.

- The Episcopal Church of the Philippines, established during the American Colonial Era of the Philippines
- The Anglican Province of Mexico
- The Anglican Episcopal Church of Brazil
- The Anglican Church in Central America, formed from the missionary dioceses of Guatemala, El Salvador, Costa Rica, Nicaragua, and Panama.
- The Episcopal Diocese of Liberia

== See also ==
- List of the Episcopal cathedrals of the United States
- List of Episcopal bishops of the United States
