= List of presiding bishops of the Episcopal Church in the United States of America =

This is a list of the presiding bishops of the Episcopal Church in the United States. Initially the position of presiding bishop rotated geographically. After 1795, the presiding bishop was the senior bishop in order of consecration. Starting in 1926, the office became elective, the Presiding Bishop being chosen at General Convention by vote by all bishops, and approved by the House of Deputies. The office now has a nine-year term. Since 1938, the presiding bishop has been required to resign his or her former diocese after accepting election.

== Presiding bishops rotated by geographical area ==
No.	Presiding Bishop	Image	Took office	Left office	Diocese	Length of term
1	William White		July 28, 1789	October 3, 1789	Pennsylvania	67 days
2	Samuel Seabury		October 5, 1789	September 8, 1792	Connecticut	2 years, 339 days
3	Samuel Provoost		September 13, 1792	September 8, 1795	New York	2 years, 360 days

== Presiding bishops by seniority ==
No.	Presiding Bishop	Image	Took office	Left office	Diocese	Length of term
4	William White		September 8, 1795	July 17, 1836	Pennsylvania	40 years, 313 days
5	Alexander Viets Griswold		July 17, 1836	February 15, 1843	Eastern	6 years, 213 days
6	Philander Chase		February 15, 1843	September 20, 1852	Illinois	9 years, 218 days
7	Thomas Church Brownell		September 20, 1852	January 13, 1865	Connecticut	12 years, 115 days
8	John Henry Hopkins		January 13, 1865	January 9, 1868	Vermont	2 years, 361 days
9	Benjamin Smith		January 9, 1868	May 31, 1884	Kentucky	16 years, 143 days
10	Alfred Lee		May 31, 1884	April 12, 1887	Delaware	2 years, 316 days
11	John Williams		April 12, 1887	February 7, 1899	Connecticut	11 years, 301 days
12	Thomas M. Clark		February 7, 1899	September 7, 1903	Rhode Island	4 years, 243 days
13	Daniel S. Tuttle		September 7, 1903	April 17, 1923	Missouri	19 years, 222 days
14	Alexander Charles Garrett		April 17, 1923	February 18, 1924	Dallas	307 days
15	Ethelbert Talbot		February 18, 1924	January 1, 1926	Central Pennsylvania	1 year, 317 days

== Presiding bishops by election ==
No.	Presiding Bishop	Image	Took office	Left office	Previous diocese	Length of term
16	John Gardner Murray		January 1, 1926	October 3, 1929	Maryland	3 years, 275 days
17	Charles P. Anderson		November 13, 1929	January 30, 1930	Chicago	78 days
18	James DeWolf Perry		March 26, 1930	December 31, 1937	Rhode Island	7 years, 280 days
19	Henry St. George Tucker		January 1, 1938	December 31, 1946	Virginia	8 years, 364 days
20	Henry Knox Sherrill		January 1, 1947	November 14, 1958	Massachusetts	11 years, 317 days
21	Arthur C. Lichtenberger		November 15, 1958	October 12, 1964	Missouri	5 years, 332 days
22	John E. Hines		January 1, 1965	May 31, 1974	Texas	9 years, 150 days
23	John Allin		June 1, 1974	December 31, 1985	Mississippi	11 years, 213 days
24	Edmond L. Browning		January 1, 1986	December 31, 1997	Hawaii	11 years, 364 days
25	Frank T. Griswold		January 1, 1998	November 1, 2006	Chicago	8 years, 304 days
26	Katharine Jefferts Schori		November 1, 2006	November 1, 2015	Nevada	9 years, 0 days
27	Michael Bruce Curry		November 1, 2015	November 1, 2024	North Carolina	9 years, 0 days
28	Sean W. Rowe		November 1, 2024	―	Northwestern Pennsylvania	1 year, 312 days
