= Granville G. Bennett =

American judge

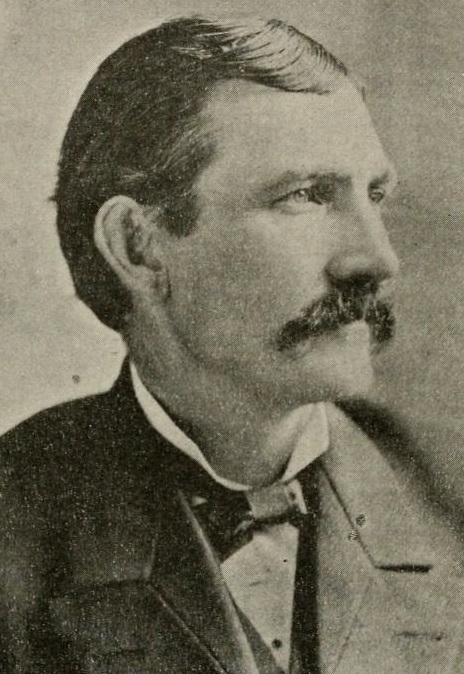
- Bennett in 1899

Member of Iowa House of Representatives
- In office 1865–1867

Member of Iowa State Senate
- In office 1867–1871

Delegate of the Territory of Dakota to the United States Congress
- In office March 4, 1879 – March 3, 1881

Personal details
- Born: Granville Gaylord Bennett; October 9, 1833 Near Bloomingburg, Ohio, U.S.
- Died: June 28, 1910 (aged 76) Hot Springs, South Dakota, U.S.
- Resting place: Mount Moriah Cemetery, Deadwood, South Dakota, U.S.
- Party: Republican
- Spouse: Mary Dawson
- Children: 4

Military service
- Branch/service: United States Army; Union Army
- Years of service: 1861 – 1865
- Rank: First Lieutenant

Granville Gaylord Bennett (October 9, 1833 – June 28, 1910) was an American lawyer who served as a justice of the Supreme Court for the Dakota Territory and as a delegate to the United States House of Representatives. He was the presiding judge at the trial of Jack McCall for the Aug. 2,1876 murder of Wild Bill Hickok in Deadwood, Dakota Territory. This trial was held in Yankton, the then headquarters of the Territory. Judge Bennett later was assigned to Lawrence county and moved his family there.

== Biography ==
Granville was born near Bloomingburg in Fayette County, Ohio, his parents were: Peter Bennett (1793–1859) and Mary Bennett née Pinkerton (1794–1894). His family moved to Fulton County, Illinois in 1849, and then to Washington, Iowa in 1855. He attended Washington College, an academy in Washington, Iowa, and then studied law. He was admitted to the bar in 1859, and practiced in Washington. In 1860, he married Mary Dawson. They were the parents of three children who survived to adulthood; daughters Estelline Rea Bennett (1868 – 1948), author of OLD DEADWOOD DAYS, and Helen Marie Bennett (1872 – 1962), an American journalist, businesswoman, and writer who organized the four women's world's fairs of the 1920s, and son The Right Reverend Granville Gaylord Bennett D.D. (1882 – 1975), the second Bishop of Duluth and the eighth Bishop of Rhode Island in the Episcopal Church in the United States of America. Another son, Robert Dawson Bennett (1878 – 1892) was killed in a hunting accident at age 14 outside of Deadwood, South Dakota.

During the American Civil War he served in the Union Army, first as an officer in the 19th Iowa Volunteer Infantry Regiment, and later on the staff of Thomas J. McKean, commander of the Army of the Tennessee. Following the war, he was discharged as a first lieutenant and returned to Washington, Iowa. He served as a member of the Iowa House of Representatives (1865–1867) and Iowa State Senate (1867–1871).

Bennett moved to the Dakota Territory in the early 1870s. He was appointed an Associate Justice of the Supreme Court of the Territory in 1875, and he served until 1878. In 1878, he was elected as the Territory's Delegate to the U.S. Congress, and served as a Republican from March 4, 1879, to March 3, 1881. He was not a candidate for reelection in 1880.

After his term in Congress, Bennett returned to Deadwood, South Dakota, where he continued to practice law. In 1902, he was elected judge of the Lawrence County Court, and he served three terms. He died in Hot Springs, Fall River County, South Dakota. He was interred in Mount Moriah Cemetery, in Deadwood.

Bennett County, South Dakota is thought by some historians to be named in his honor, whereas others attribute the county name to John E. Bennett, and some claim it honors both men.

U.S. House of Representatives
| Preceded by Jefferson P. Kidder | Delegate to the U.S. House of Representatives from Dakota Territory; March 4, 1879 – March 3, 1881 | Succeeded by Richard F. Pettigrew |
