= Helen Bennett =

Helen Bennett may refer to:

- Helen Bennett (actress) (1911–2001), American actress
- Helen Bennett (journalist) (1872–1962), American journalist, manager of the Chicago Collegiate Bureau of Occupations, envisioned of the Woman's World's Fair
- Helen Bennett (presenter), British television presenter, see The Wall Game
- Helen Cutaran Bennett, foreign secretary of the Philippine Republic under president Elpidio Quirino
- Mother-1 of the Bionix Six
- Helen Bennett, British woman who was a victim of the 2005 Kuşadası minibus bombing
