= St. Columba's Chapel (Middletown, Rhode Island) =

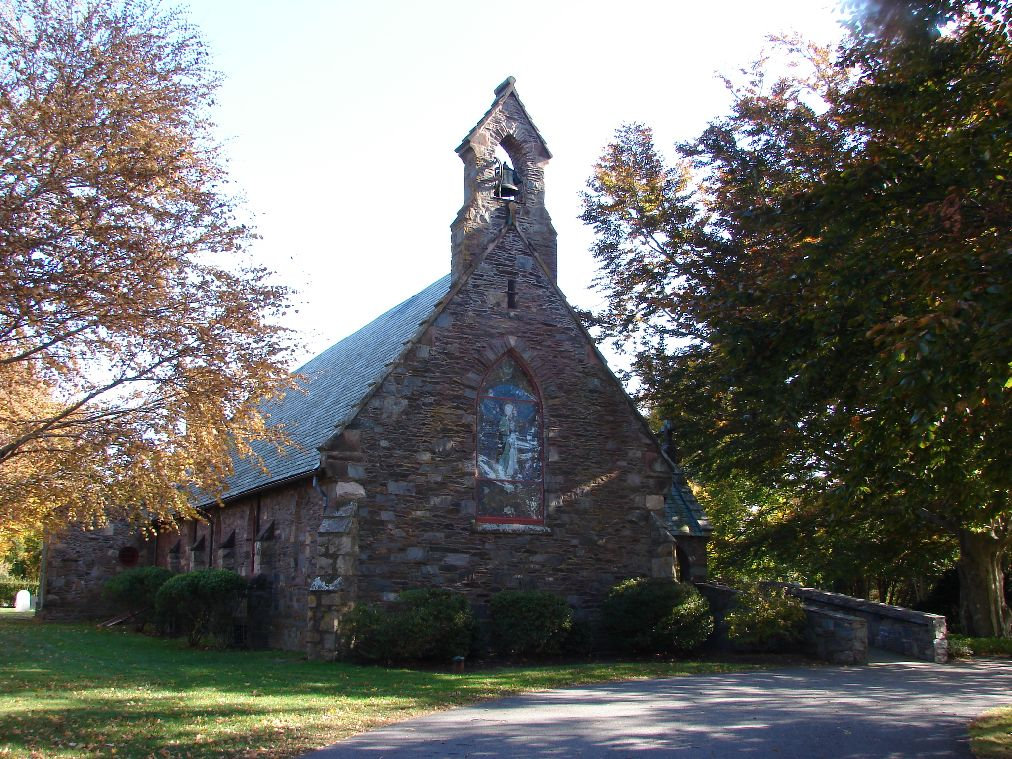
- St Columba's Chapel
- St. Columba's Chapel
- 41.507095°N 71.2421°W
- Location: Middletown, Rhode Island, US
- Denomination: Episcopalian
- Website: http://www.stcolumbaschapel.org/

History
- Former name: The Berkeley Memorial Chapel
- Founded: 1885
- Dedicated: 1886

Architecture
- Architect: Wilson Eyre
- Years built: 1886

Administration
- District: Aquidneck Deanery
- Diocese: Episcopal Diocese of Rhode Island

St. Columba's Chapel in Middletown, Rhode Island, is a parish church of the Episcopal Diocese of Rhode Island of the Episcopal Church. The church is located at 55 Vaucluse Avenue, Middletown, Rhode Island. The chapel is named for the Irish-born missionary St. Columba, renowned for his teaching, healing, and miracles in sixth-century Scotland.

== History ==
Eugene Sturtevant and his wife, Mary Clark Sturtevant donated an acre of land in 1882 for a chapel to serve the neighboring community. Mary Clark Sturtevant was a daughter of Thomas March Clark, Bishop of Rhode Island who would later serve as Presiding Bishop of the Episcopal Church.

The church was originally known as The Berkeley Memorial Chapel in honor of Bishop George Berkeley of Derry. The cornerstone of the chapel was laid on October 11, 1884. The first service was held on June 23, 1885, even though the chapel was not complete. The chapel was consecrated on August 31, 1886, as a mission of the Episcopal Diocese of Rhode Island by Bishop Clark.

In its early history, the chapel had a close association with Saint George's School in Middletown. Many of the ordained teachers officiated at services, and before the school's own chapel was built, boys walked to St. Columba's for Sunday worship.

The chapel contains a collection of eleven stained-glass windows, ten by David Maitland Armstrong, executed by Tiffany Studio. The eleventh window, by an unknown artist, was donated by actor Edwin Booth, brother of John Wilkes Booth, and his daughter, Edwina, in memory of Edwina's mother, Mary Devlin. The churchyard is distinguished by an English lychgate.

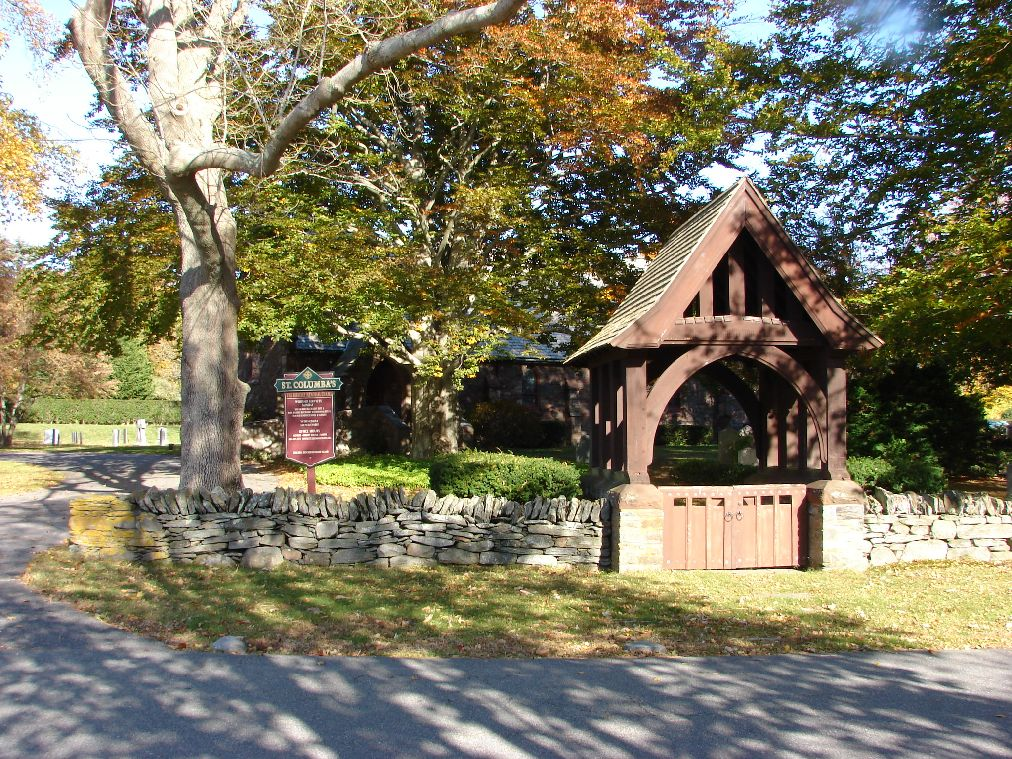
St. Columba's lychgate

== Churchyard ==
A number of significant persons, mostly from "Newport society", are buried in St. Columba's churchyard (a.k.a. Berkeley Memorial Cemetery). They include the following:

- United States Senator Claiborne Pell
- Dorrance Hill Hamilton - philanthropist
- Prince Serge Mdivani - socialite
- Joseph W. Frazer - industrialist
- Frazier Jelke - oleomargarine magnate
- Commander Hugo W. Koehler, USN - international man of mystery
- John Russell Pope - architect
- Raphael Pumpelly - explorer and geologist
- Dr. Alexander Hamilton Rice, Jr. - surgeon, geologist and explorer
- Brigadier General James Henry Van Alen, USV - Civil War general
- Jimmy Van Alen - founder of the International Tennis Hall of Fame
- Varick Frissell - filmmaker
- Admiral Harry E. Yarnell, USN
