= Helen Bennett (journalist) =

American journalist

- Born: Helen Marie Bennett; September 17, 1872; Washington, Iowa, U.S.
- Died: April 22, 1962 (aged 89); Providence, Rhode Island
- Occupations: Journalist, businesswoman
- Parent(s): Granville G. Bennett, Mary Ann Dawson Bennett

Helen Marie Bennett (September 17, 1872 – April 22, 1962) was an American journalist, businesswoman, and writer who organized the four women's world's fairs of the 1920s. She worked as a journalist for the Chicago Record-Herald and was the author of Women and Work. She served as manager of the Chicago Collegiate Bureau of Occupations and is credited with envisioning the Woman's World's Fair with Ruth Hanna McCormick. She was described in the sounvenir program as the managing director of the 1925 Woman's World Fair.

Helen Bennett was born on September 17, 1872, in Washington, Iowa. She was the daughter of Judge Granville Gaylord Bennett, an American lawyer who served as a justice of the Supreme Court for the Dakota Territory and as a delegate to the United States House of Representatives, and Mary Dawson. Her formative years were spent in Deadwood, South Dakota. She had one sister, Estelline Rea Bennett (1868–1948), a journalist and author of Old Deadwood Days, and two brothers, Robert Dawson Bennett (1878–1892), who was killed in a tragic hunting accident at age 14, and The Right Reverend Granville Gaylord Bennett D.D. (1882–1975), who was the second bishop of Duluth and the eighth bishop of Rhode Island in the Episcopal Church in the United States of America.

== Bibliography ==
- Ganz, Cheryl R. (January 2012). The 1933 Chicago World's Fair: A Century of Progress. University of Illinois Press. ISBN 978-0-252-07852-1.
- Hills, William Henry; Luce, Robert (1926). The Writer. Writer Publishing Company.
- Waldheim, Charles (1 September 2005). Chicago Architecture: Histories, Revisions, Alternatives. University of Chicago Press. ISBN 978-0-226-87038-0.
