= Diocese of Duluth =

The Diocese of Duluth may refer to

- Episcopal Diocese of Duluth, a defunct diocese of the Episcopal Church (United States)
- Roman Catholic Diocese of Duluth
