= Philander Chase =

American bishop, educator, and pioneer (1775–1852)

The Most Reverend Philander Chase
- 6th Presiding Bishop of the Episcopal Church
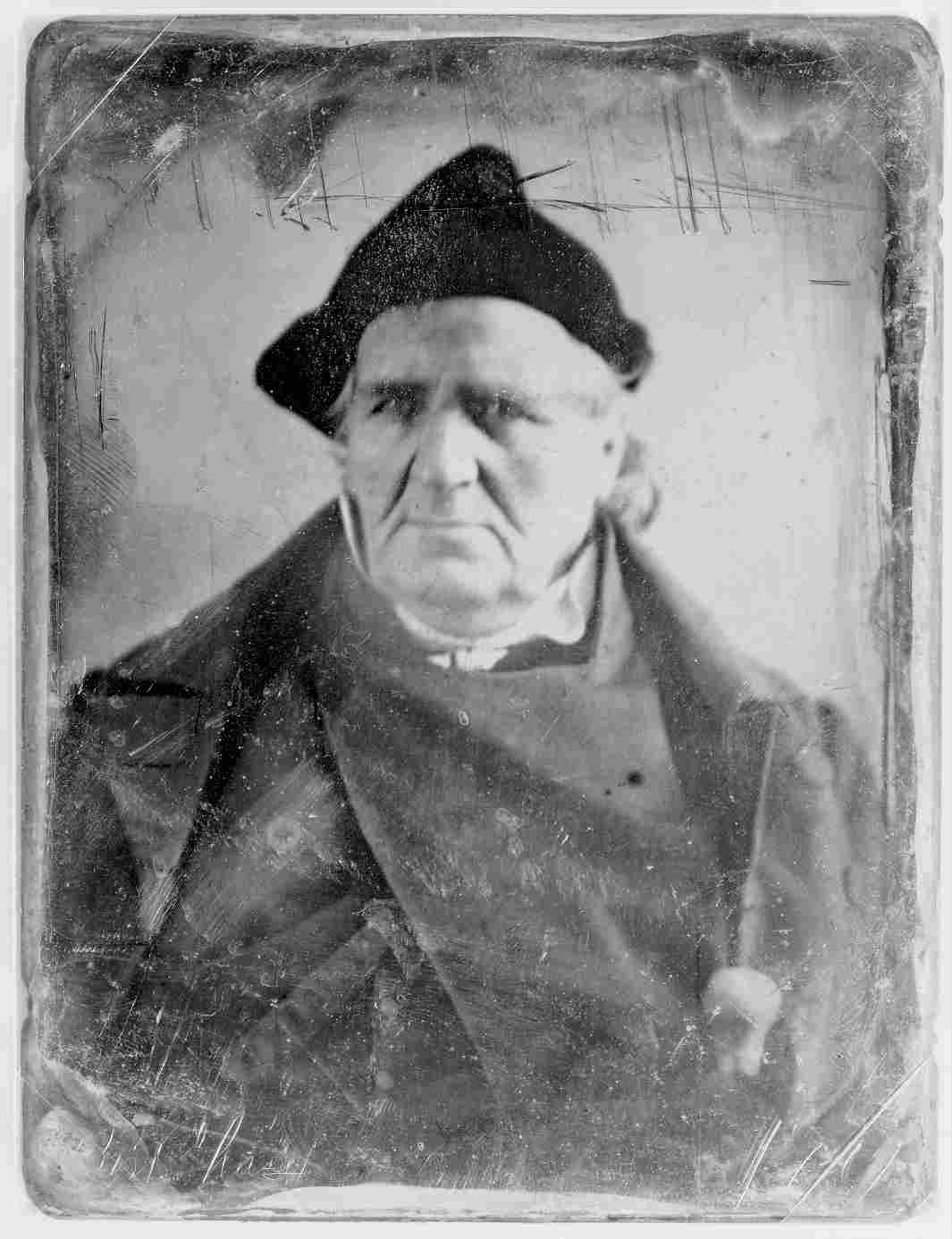
- Church: Episcopal Church
- In office: 1843–1852
- Predecessor: Alexander Viets Griswold
- Successor: Thomas Church Brownell
- Other post: Bishop of Illinois (1835-1852)
- Previous post: Bishop of Ohio (1819-1832)

Orders
- Ordination: November 10, 1799 by Samuel Provoost
- Consecration: February 11, 1819 by William White

Personal details
- Born: December 14, 1775 Cornish, Province of New Hampshire, British America
- Died: September 20, 1852 (aged 76) Brimfield, Illinois, U.S.
- Buried: Jubilee College
- Parents: Dudley Chase & Alice Corbett
- Spouse: Mary Fay (m. 1796; d. 1818); Sophia May Ingraham (m. 1819)
- Children: 6

Sainthood
- Feast day: September 22
- Venerated in: Episcopal Church

Philander Chase (December 14, 1775 – September 20, 1852) was an Episcopal Church bishop, educator, pioneer of the United States western frontier, especially in Ohio and Illinois, and founder of Kenyon College.

== Early life and family ==
Born in Cornish, New Hampshire, to one of the town's founders, Dudley Chase, and his wife Allace Corbett, Philander Chase was the youngest of fourteen children, and ultimately survived all his siblings. His ancestors had been Puritans who fled to New England. Philander wrote in 1844 that "Aquila Chase, according to a tradition among his descendants,was a native of Cornwall, in England," though one of his relatives traced the family's origins to Chesham in Buckinghamshire. His father, a deacon at their local Congregational church, wanted one of his five sons to become a minister. As had three of his brothers (who however, had no inclinations toward ministry), Philander enrolled at Dartmouth College. As a student, Chase became acquainted with the Book of Common Prayer and became a lay reader in the Episcopal Church. After graduating in 1795, he worked as a lay reader in various New England towns while studying for ordination. Thus, he helped establish Trinity Church in his hometown. He studied with the Rev. Thomas Ellison, rector of St. Peter's Church in Albany, New York, while supporting himself teaching at the newly organized city school.

He married Mary Fay (1779-1818), of Hardwick, Massachusetts. They had three sons: Dudley, George (1797–?), and Philander (1800–1824) before her death after many years of health problems in May, 1818. Chase remarried to Sophia May Ingraham (1783–1864) the following summer and had three more children, Henry (1820–1896), Mary (1822–1894) and Philander (1824–1872).

While Philander Chase was Bishop of Ohio, his 12-year-old nephew Salmon P. Chase became his ward after the younger Chase's father died. Chase oversaw the younger man's education in Worthington. The younger Chase then entered Cincinnati College and went on to become a statesman and jurist, including Chief Justice of the United States. His brother Dudley Chase also achieved distinction as a U.S. Senator from Vermont, and his nephew Dudley Chase Denison became a U.S. Representative from Vermont.

== Ministry ==
On May 10, 1798, Bishop Samuel Provoost ordained Chase a deacon at St. George's Chapel on Long Island, New York, and also ordained Robert Wetmore to the priesthood. Both were assigned missionary duties in the state's northern and western parts. Chase became one of only three Episcopal clergymen above the highlands. Wetmore found himself unsuited to the rigorous travels, and settled at Schenectady, while Chase continued evangelizing on horseback, as well as baptizing, preaching and otherwise meeting the needs of widely scattered Episcopalians and other Protestants in the more rural areas from Troy to Lake George to Auburn and Bloomfield. In 1798, he helped organize the first congregation of Trinity Church in Utica, New York and the following year what would become St. John's Episcopal Church, Canandaigua, as well as preaching to the Mohawk in Canajoharie where a church had been established by the Society for the Propagation of the Gospel.

In 1799, the Rev. Chase accepted a position to serve congregations in Poughkeepsie, New York and relatively nearby Fishkill, NY. After Bishop Provoost ordained him as a priest at St. Paul's Church in New York City on November 10, he called for his wife to join him. Chase then taught school in Poughkeepsie and served more than five years at Christ Church, which the Rt. Rev. Samuel Seabury had founded as a mission more than three decades earlier, but whose Loyalist rector had left during the American Revolution.

In 1805 the Chase accepted a challenge to establish the first Episcopal congregation in Louisiana, becoming the founding rector of what ultimately became Christ Church Cathedral, New Orleans. He and Mary had moved south hoping to cure her tuberculosis. They left their children with relatives in New England. Despite the successful parish organization and profitability of his school, they missed their children. With a bank loan, Chase purchased a 19-year-old slave named Jack for $500 to become their house servant. After three months, Jack escaped, boarding a steamer bound for Liverpool, "a hard blow and humiliating as well" for Chase. In 1819, Jack returned to New Orleans and was captured; Chase, by then long gone from Louisiana, emancipated him rather than have him sold.

When Mary's health seemed to improve, and wanting to oversee the further education of their sons George and Philander at the Cheshire Academy, Chase accepted a position as rector of Christ Church, Hartford, Connecticut in 1811, where he would serve six years, referred to in his autobiography as the "Sunshine Years".

Chase continued to feel a call to evangelize and remained deeply interested in the religious condition and prospects of the westward pioneers. He also disagreed on educational and other matters with Bishop Provoost's successor, the Rt. Rev. John Henry Hobart. Thus, in 1817 Chase traveled to Ohio, and on March 16, 1817, preached his first sermon in the new state, at Conneaut Creek near Salem. He continued to evangelize on the frontier, building on the missionary work of the Rev. Dr. Joseph Doddridge in the Ohio Valley and the Rev. Roger Searle in the Western Reserve. Chase reached Cincinnati in May, and helping to form what later became Christ Church Cathedral. Chase bought a farm in the relatively new town of Worthington founded in 1803, agreed to serve five parishes nearby, and became principal of Worthington Academy. He then called his family to join him in Cleveland. Chase chaired the first Episcopal convention in Ohio, which began on January 5, 1818. In May his wife died. In June, six Ohio clergy plus laymen met again in Worthington and elected him as their unfunded bishop.

== Episcopacy ==
Chase traveled east for ordination that winter, but was forced to defend his character before the Standing Committee would give its assent. Elderly Presiding Bishop William White led the consecration service at St. James Episcopal Church in Philadelphia on February 11, 1819, assisted by Bishop Hobart of New York, Bishop Kemp of Maryland and Bishop Croes of New Jersey. He was the 18th bishop consecrated in The Episcopal Church.

Bishop Chase returned on horseback to his diocese, conducting a service at Zanesville on the National Road on February 28 and reaching his home in early March. Between June 1820 and June 1821, he preached 200 times, baptised fifty people, and confirmed another 175 while traveling 1,279 miles on horseback. The following year, he accepted the presidency of Cincinnati Academy, hoping to ease his fiscal crunch. Chase continued to build up the church in that state, lobbying for a seminary there, contrary to Bishop Hobart's belief that the General Theological Seminary in New York sufficed, and requested missionaries from coastal states. The Rev. Ethan Allen was among those answering the call.

In October 1823, Chase even sailed to England armed only with a letter of introduction from Henry Clay to raise funds for his frontier diocese, especially his planned school and seminary. During his fundraising tour of the British Isles he was accompanied by the Thomas Burgess who was Bishop of St Davids and the founder of St David's College. The largest donation came from Jane, Dowager Countess of Rosse, while a collection of books was donated by Bishop Thomas Burgess. By the following July, they had raised nearly $30,000, and Chase started home. In November 1824 the Ohio convention authorized the seminary and the purchase of 8,000 acres in Knox County. In December, 1824 the Ohio Legislature chartered Kenyon College and Bexley Hall seminary, named after major donors Lord Kenyon and Baron Bexley. The foundation was somewhat bittersweet, for Philander Chase Jr., who had become an Episcopal priest like his father and accepted a position in South Carolina, died.

Though Chase had initially donated his Worthington farm for the school, realizing it needed more land, he purchased 8000 acres in Knox County northeast of Worthington, naming the location Gambier after another major donor, Lord Gambier. Chase hoped to establish a self-sufficient community free of urban vices such as drinking and dancing, which would help students to focus on their studies. The new institution had a grammar school as well as a college, post office, grist and sawmill, farm and printing press. His wife Sophia not only cooked for the students, did their laundry and nursed them, but kept the school running during her husband's many fundraising trips. However, his management style proved controversial with the trustees, among others. Some did not believe a bishop should hold so many positions, so the Ohio Convention of 1831 asked him to relinquish some control. Instead, on September 9, 1831, Chase resigned his bishopric, as well as positions at the school and college. He was succeeded as Bishop and college president by Charles McIlvaine.

Chase then moved his family about twenty miles away, to a farm he had purchased near Millersburg, which he called the "Valley of Peace". The following spring, the missionary call returned, and he moved his family to Gilead, Michigan and began evangelizing again.

Meanwhile, in 1835, Episcopalians who had moved further west had decided that they needed a separate diocese, and established the Diocese of Illinois. Although Chase did not attend that convention, he accepted their call to be the first Episcopal bishop of Illinois, and soon moved near Peoria, Illinois.

However, Chase still dreamed of establishing a self-sufficient rural college, and traveled to England first to raise funds for what became Jubilee College in Brimfield, Illinois. The cornerstone was laid in 1839. Fundraising proved more difficult this time, so Chase undertook another tour, this time in the southern states while his cousin Samuel handled operations, his sons Henry, Philander and Dudley handled the farm and sheep, and his daughter Mary ran a small girls' boarding school. The chapel was finished in 1840–1. However, fire destroyed the saw and grist mill in 1849.

Meanwhile, Chase grew in seniority. In 1843, he became the sixth Presiding Bishop of the national church.

== Death and legacy ==
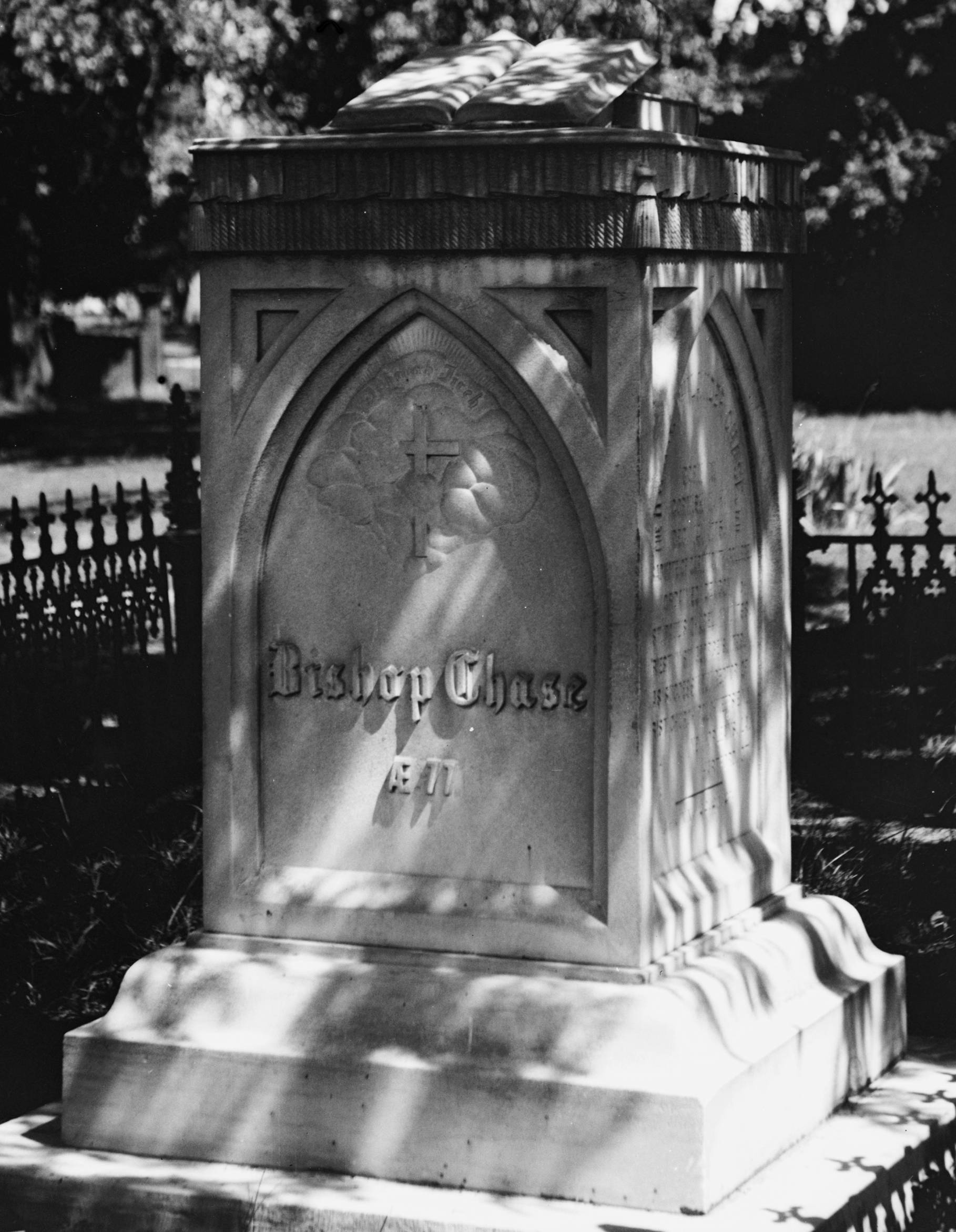
Grave monument in Jubilee Cemetery next to Jubilee College in Peoria County, Illinois

Chase spent the final years of his life founding Jubilee College and the surrounding frontier community near present-day Peoria, Illinois. On September 14, 1852, while riding with his wife in a carriage near their home, it overturned. Chase was thrown and suffered a concussion. He told those carrying him home, "You may now order my coffin, --I am glad of it!" He died in his sleep on the 20th, and was buried at Jubilee's cemetery.

The college faced financial difficulties after his death and closed within a decade. After service as a chaplain in the Civil War, Samuel Chase attempted to revive the college, but failed and sold off some land in 1871. However, the core of the college (other than the cemetery) was donated to State of Illinois, which restored some college buildings in the 1970s (after which it was listed on the National Register of Historic Places). Although the college buildings have generally remained closed since 2008 due to state budget cuts, the surrounding park remains open, including picnic and camping areas. His papers are held by Kenyon College.

The liturgical calendar of the Episcopal Church (USA) remembers Bishop Chase annually on September 22.

== Writings ==
- Christianity and Masonry Reconciled (1814)
- A Plea for the West (1826)
- The Star in the West, or Kenyon College (1828)
- Defense of Kenyon College (1831)
- A Plea for Jubilee (1835)
- Reminiscences: An Autobiography (First Edition, 1841), (Second Edition, 1848, various publishers in 2 volumes)

== See also ==
- List of presiding bishops of the Episcopal Church in the United States of America
- List of Episcopal bishops of the United States
- Historical list of bishops of the Episcopal Church in the United States of America
- Chase family

== Notes ==
Episcopal Church (USA) titles
Preceded by New Diocese	1st Bishop of Ohio; 1819 – 1832	Succeeded by Charles Pettit McIlvaine
Preceded by New Diocese	1st Bishop of Illinois; 1835 – September 20, 1852	Succeeded by Henry J. Whitehouse
Preceded by Alexander Viets Griswold	6th Presiding Bishop; February 15, 1843 – September 20, 1852	Succeeded by Thomas Church Brownell
Academic offices
Preceded by Elijah Slack	President of Cincinnati College; 1822 – 1823	Succeeded by William Holmes McGuffey
Preceded by New	President of Kenyon College (and Bexley Hall); 1824 – 1831	Succeeded by Charles Pettit McIlvaine
Preceded by New	President of Jubilee College; 1839 – 1852	Succeeded by Closed
