= George Nelson Hunt III =

American Episcopal bishop (1931–2022)

The Right Reverend George Nelson Hunt D.D.
- Bishop of Rhode Island
- Church: The Episcopal Church
- Diocese: Rhode Island
- In office: 1980–1994
- Predecessor: Frederick H. Belden
- Successor: Geralyn Wolf

Orders
- Ordination: 1956
- Consecration: May 3, 1980 by John Allin

Personal details
- Born: December 6, 1931 Louisville, Kentucky, U.S.
- Died: October 23, 2022 (aged 90) Santa Rosa, California, U.S.
- Denomination: Anglican
- Parents: George Nelson Hunt Jr. & Jessie Mae Alter
- Spouse: Barbara Noel Plamp
- Children: 3

George Nelson Hunt III (December 6, 1931 – October 23, 2022) was the Episcopal Bishop of Rhode Island from 1980 to 1994.

== Early life, education and family ==
The son of George Nelson Hunt Jr. and Jessie Mae (Alter) Hunt, Hunt was born in Louisville, Kentucky. He attended the University of the South, at Sewanee, Tennessee, where he was awarded a B.A. in 1953. He did graduate work at the Virginia Theological Seminary in Alexandria, Virginia, where he earned his M.Div. degree and was ordained to the ministry in 1956.

During his studies, in June 1955 he had married Barbara Noel Plamp. They had three children together.

He received the degree of Doctor of Divinity from Yale University in 1980. The University of Rhode Island awarded him an honorary L.H.D. in 1995.

== Career ==
In 1956, he was appointed vicar of Holy Trinity Church in Gillette, Wyoming and in 1957, additionally, he became a priest in charge of St. John's Church in Upton, Wyoming. In 1959 he took on the additional responsibilities of priest in charge of St. Francis Church, Wright, Wyoming. In 1960, he was appointed assistant priest at St. Paul's Church in Oakland, California. He served there for two years before being called in 1962 as rector of St. Alban's Church, Worland, Wyoming.

In 1965, he was called back to California as rector of St. Anselm's Church in Lafayette. In 1970, he became rector of St. Paul's Church, Salinas, California. From 1975 to 1980, he served as executive officer of the Episcopal Diocese of California, gaining statewide experience.

In 1980 he was called east and consecrated as bishop of the Episcopal Diocese of Rhode Island.

In 1994, he left Rhode Island to serve as interim bishop of the Episcopal Diocese of Hawaii until his retirement in 1996.

Episcopal Church (USA) titles
Preceded by Frederick H. Belden	11th Bishop of Rhode Island; 1980–1994	Succeeded by Geralyn Wolf
