= Thomas M. Clark =

American Episcopal bishop

The Most Reverend Thomas M. Clark
- 12th Presiding Bishop of the Episcopal Church
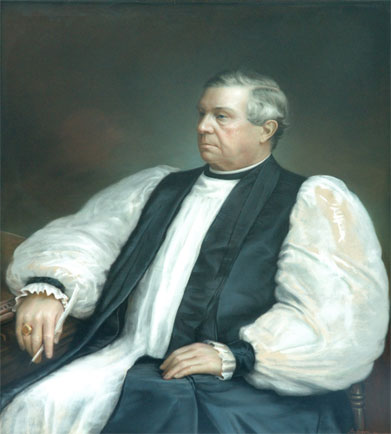
- Church: Episcopal Church
- In office: 1899–1903
- Predecessor: John Williams
- Successor: Daniel S. Tuttle
- Other post: Bishop of Rhode Island (1854-1903)

Orders
- Ordination: November 6, 1836 by Alexander Viets Griswold
- Consecration: December 6, 1854 by Thomas Church Brownell

Personal details
- Born: July 4, 1812 Newburyport, Massachusetts, United States
- Died: September 7, 1903 (aged 91) Newport, Rhode Island, United States
- Denomination: Anglican
- Parents: Thomas March Clark & Rebecca Wheelwright
- Spouse: Caroline Howard
- Education: Yale University; Princeton University

Thomas March Clark (July 4, 1812 – September 7, 1903) was an American Episcopal prelate who served as Bishop of Rhode Island between 1854–1903 and Presiding Bishop of the Episcopal Church between 1899 and 1903.

== Life and career ==
Thomas March Clark was born at Newburyport, Massachusetts on July 4, 1812. He graduated at Yale College in 1831, studied theology at Princeton, and was licensed to preach as a Presbyterian in 1835. He became an Episcopalian in the following year, and was rector of Grace Church, Boston, for seven years, afterward holding charges in Philadelphia, Hartford, and Providence. In 1854 he was consecrated Bishop of Rhode Island, and in 1899, on the death of Bishop John Williams of Connecticut, became Presiding Bishop of the Episcopal Church in America. His Reminiscences appeared in 1895; among his other works are Early Discipline and Culture (1852), and Primary Truths of Religion (1869).

He died in Newport, Rhode Island, on September 7, 1903, at age 91.

His mother's family was related to the Puritan clergyman John Wheelwright.

His brother Rufus Wheelwright Clark was also a minister and author; another brother, Rev Dr Samuel Adam Clark, was also a minister.

== See also ==
- List of presiding bishops of the Episcopal Church in the United States of America
- List of Episcopal bishops of the United States
- List of bishops of the Episcopal Church in the United States of America

Episcopal Church (USA) titles
Preceded by John Williams	12th Presiding Bishop; 1899–1903	Succeeded by Daniel Sylvester Tuttle
Preceded by John Prentiss Kewly Henshaw	Bishop of Rhode Island; 1854–1903	Succeeded by William N. McVickar
