= William N. McVickar =

The Right Reverend William Neilson McVickar D.D., LL.D.
- Bishop of Rhode Island
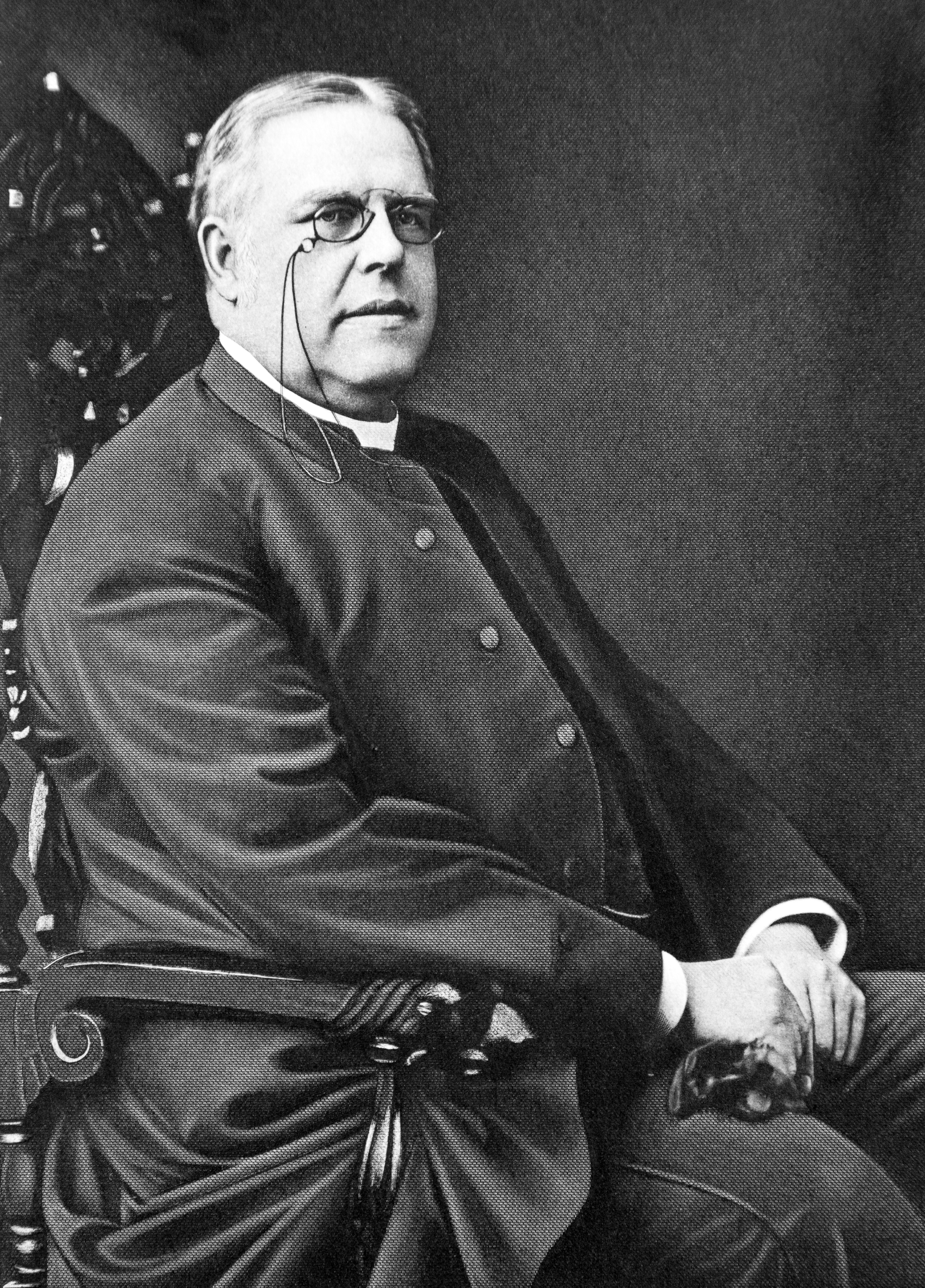
- Church: Episcopal church
- Diocese: Rhode Island
- In office: 1903–1910
- Predecessor: Thomas M. Clark
- Successor: James De Wolf Perry
- Previous post: Coadjutor Bishop of Rhode Island (1898-1903)

Orders
- Ordination: July 1868
- Consecration: January 27, 1898 by William Croswell Doane

Personal details
- Born: October 19, 1843 New York City, New York, United States
- Died: June 28, 1910 (aged 66) Beverly, Massachusetts, United States
- Buried: Saint John's Cemetery, Providence, Rhode Island
- Denomination: Anglican
- Parents: John Augustus McVickar & Charlotte Neilson

William Neilson McVickar (October 19, 1843 – June 28, 1910) was the sixth Bishop of Rhode Island in the Episcopal Church.

== Biography ==
McVickar was born in New York City, on October 19, 1843, the son of Dr John A. McVickar and Charlotte Neilson. He graduated from Columbia University with a Bachelor of Arts in 1865 and with a Master of Arts in 1868. He also studied at the General Theological seminary and graduated in 1868. He was ordered deacon in 1867 and priest in 1868 after which he became rector of Holy Trinity Church on 125th street in New York City. In 1875 he became rector of Trinity Church in Philadelphia. He also served as deputy to the general convention from 1883 till 1897.

McVickar was elected Coadjutor Bishop of Rhode Island on October 19, 1897, at a special session of the diocesan convention of Rhode Island held in Providence. He was consecrated at Holy Trinity church, Philadelphia on January 27, 1898, by Bishop William Croswell Doane of Albany. He succeeded as diocesan in 1903 and served till his death in 1910.

== See also ==
- List of Succession of Bishops for the Episcopal Church, USA
