= James Dow Morrison =

The Rt. Rev. James Dow Morrison First Bishop of Duluth
- I Bishop of Duluth
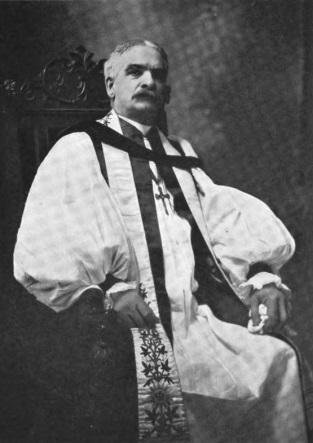
- Church: Episcopal Church in the United States of America
- See: Episcopal Diocese of Duluth

Orders
- Consecration: February 2, 1897

Personal details
- Born: October 16, 1844; Waddington, New York
- Died: January 31, 1934 (aged 89); Ogdensburg, New York

James Dow Morrison (1844–1934) was the first bishop of Duluth in the Episcopal Church in the United States of America.

== Biography ==
James Dow Morrison was born in Waddington, New York on October 16, 1844.

He was consecrated bishop on February 2, 1897.

He died in Ogdensburg, New York on January 31, 1934.
