= Frederick H. Belden =

The Right Reverend Frederick Hesley Belden S.T.D., D.D., L.H.D., D.H.S.
- Bishop of Rhode Island
- Church: Episcopal church
- Diocese: Rhode Island
- In office: 1972–1979
- Predecessor: John Seville Higgins
- Successor: George Nelson Hunt III
- Previous post: Coadjutor Bishop of Rhode Island (1971-1972)

Orders
- Ordination: June 1936 by G. Ashton Oldham
- Consecration: September 25, 1971 by John E. Hines
- Rank: 666 in the American Succession

Personal details
- Born: September 25, 1909 Watertown, New York, United States
- Died: November 4, 1979 (aged 70) Denver, Colorado, United States
- Denomination: Anglican
- Parents: Stacy Beardsley Denn Belden & Emma May Hesley
- Spouse: Dorothy Elizabeth Reumann
- Children: 4

Frederick Hesley Belden (September 25, 1909 - November 4, 1979) was the tenth Bishop of the Episcopal Diocese of Rhode Island.

== Early life, education, and family ==
The son of Stacy Beardsley Denn Belden and Emma May Hesley, he attended Hartwick College, where he earned his B.A. in 1932. He went on the study at the General Theological Seminary, where he earned an S.T.B. in 1936 and in 1970, was awarded an S.T.D. degree. He married Dorothy Elizabeth Reumann on November 26, 1936. They had four children.

== Career ==
Ordained to the ministry of the Episcopal Church, first as deacon on June 16, in 1935 and then priest in June 1936. He first served as rector of Christ Church, Duanesburg, New York for a year, when he was called to be rector of Christ Church, Walton, New York from 1937 to 1942. From there, he became rector of St John's Church, Johnstown, New York from 1942 to 1949. He first came to Rhode Island to become rector of St. Paul's Church, Wickford, Rhode Island in 1949. while rector there, he served as President of the Rhode Island State Council of Churches in 1964-65 and warden of the Guild of Ascension, 1961–69.

In 1971, he was elected Bishop Coadjutor of the Diocese of Rhode Island. He succeeded Bishop Higgins the following year and remained Bishop of Rhode Island until his death in 1979. Noteworthy during his time as president of the Rhode Island State Council of Churches and especially during his time as bishop were his ecumenical efforts as evidenced, in part, by formation of a covenant relationship between twelve parishes of the Diocese of Rhode Island and the Roman Catholic Diocese of Providence. These efforts were recognized with the award of honorary doctorate degrees by Brown University and Providence College.

He was buried at the Old Narragansett Church.

Episcopal Church (USA) titles
Preceded by John S. Higgins	10th Bishop of Rhode Island; 1972 – 1979	Succeeded by George Nelson Hunt, III
