= Jubilee College State Park =

- Jubilee College
- U.S. National Register of Historic Places
- Illinois State Historic Site
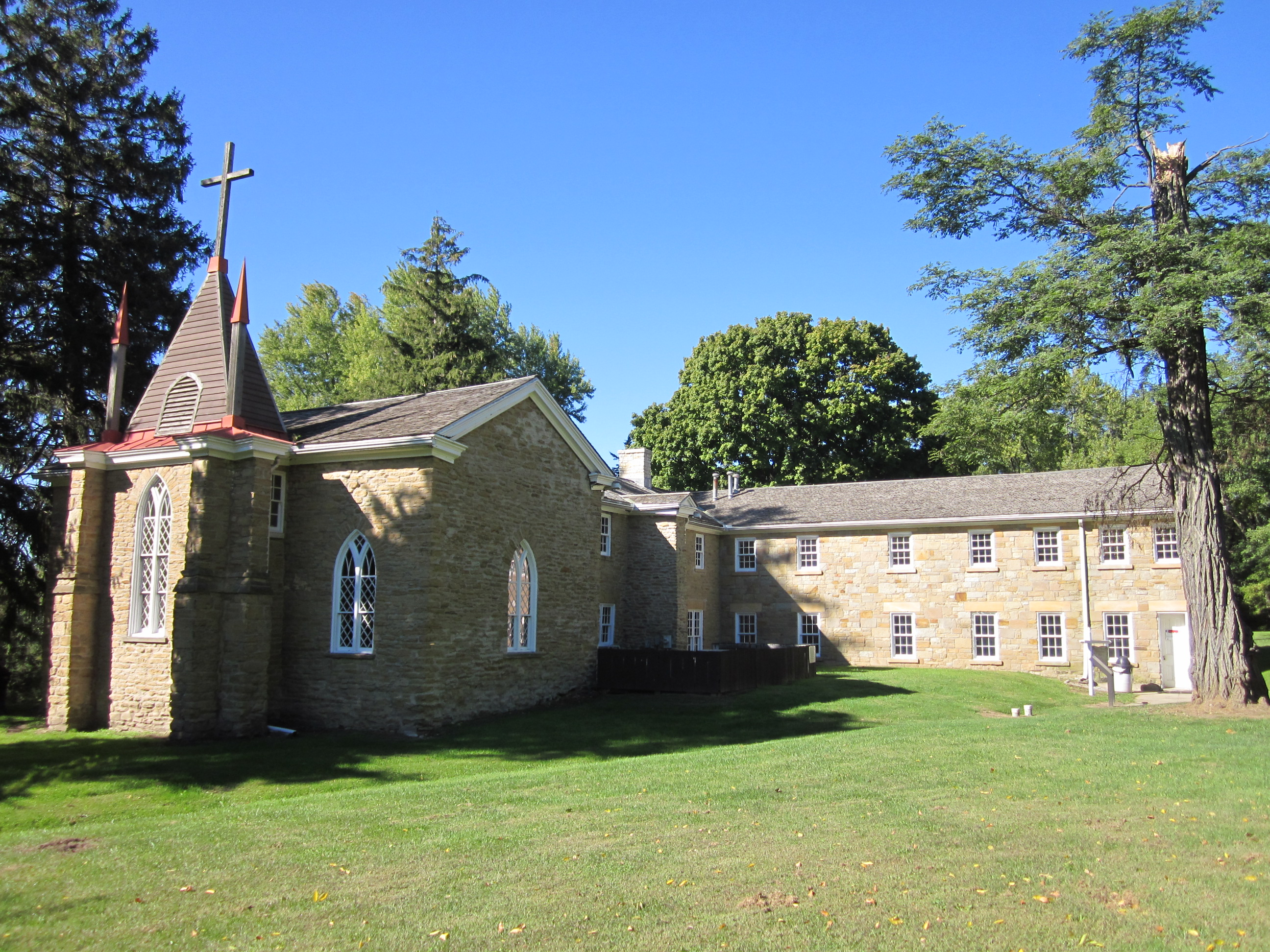

- Location within Illinois Location within the United States
- Location: 13921 W. Route 150, Brimfield, Illinois
- Coordinates: 40°49′26″N 89°47′56″W
- Built: 1839
- Architectural style: Gothic Revival
- NRHP reference No.: 72000465

Significant dates
- Added to NRHP: January 4, 1972
- Designated: January 4, 1972

Jubilee College State Park
- IUCN category III (natural monument or feature)
- Interactive map of Jubilee College State Park
- Location: Peoria County, Illinois
- Nearest city: Brimfield, Illinois
- Area: 3,200 acres (1,295 ha)
- Established: 1933
- Governing body: Illinois Department of Natural Resources

Jubilee College State Park is an Illinois state park located 6 mi (9.7 km) west of Peoria, Illinois. It contains Jubilee College State Historic Site, a frontier Illinois college active from 1840 to 1862.

The entire Jubilee College site is still owned by the state of Illinois. The 90-acre (36 ha) grounds are operated by the Illinois Historic Preservation Agency (IHPA), and the surrounding 3,100 acres (1,300 ha) of open space are operated by the Illinois Department of Natural Resources (DNR).

== Jubilee College Historic Site ==
=== Jubilee College ===
==== Founding ====
Jubilee College, and the frontier community that supported it, was founded in 1839 by Episcopal bishop Philander Chase. He named it after his expression of thankfulness and joy: "If you ask me for the reason why I call my Illinois institution Jubilee College, I answer: That name of all others suits my feelings and circumstances. I wish to give thanks and rejoice...". Earlier in his career, Chase had founded Kenyon College in Ohio.

This was one of the earliest educational institutions in Illinois, and the earliest educational enterprise by the Episcopal Church west of Ohio.

Chase strove to isolate the college from the nuisances and temptations of towns or villages. He also attempted to keep the administration under his own control, and there were no trustees appointed during his lifetime. Chase acquired 3,910 acres and held all structures in his name.

The cornerstone of Jubilee chapel and schoolhouse was laid on April 3, 1839. The two-story, Gothic Revival chapel was consecrated on November 15, 1840. The L-shaped building design was adapted from an Anglican chapel near London, England. It is made of native sandstone.

The collegiate and theological departments were operational by 1841. There was an average of about fifty students with three or four faculty members. Until 1852, the tuition was $100 per year, except for sons of Illinois clergy who could attend for half price and orphans who were educated for free. Most students were from Illinois, but some were from Connecticut or other eastern or southern states. The first graduation was held in July 1847, with five students receiving degrees.

In 1836, Chase lived about a mile to the east in a home called Robin's Nest, a log cabin "made of mud and sticks and filled with young ones". The site originally had other buildings, including a sawmill, a grist mill, a small hand printing press for the periodical "The Motto", a store, a blacksmith shop, a shoemaker's shop, and cottages for teachers and laborers who lived on the property. The sawmill and flour mill were constructed on Kickapoo Creek, two miles south of the college, and used both steam and water power. However, fire destroyed the sawmill and grist mill in September 1849. In 1857, fire also destroyed the west wing of the main building.

==== Closure ====
After the Bishop's death in 1852, the college closed in 1862. In 1876, the church sold parts of the property and leased out the main property for use as schools.

In 1926, the Circuit Court of Peoria annulled the charter due to non-performance and ordered the property to be liquidated within two years. The remaining land was publicly auctioned on July 8, 1931. Dr. George Zeller bought the property. In October 1932, the property transferred to private ownership and eventually to the state of Illinois.

=== Historic site ===
In the 1930s, the Civilian Conservation Corps repaired the building, but it remained dormant until major restorations in the 1970s.

In 1933 the college and grounds, then consisting of 93 acres (38 ha), were presented to the state of Illinois. The site has since been expanded to 3,200 acres (1,295 ha) and includes the original Chase residence and church.

The State of Illinois occasionally offers guided tours of the centerpiece of Jubilee College, the 1840s building that housed the school's Episcopal chapel, classrooms, and dormitory facilities. Restored in the 1970s, one wing contains the recreated schoolmaster's office and library, which also features a video theater and museum exhibits about the college.

The Jubilee College site was added to the National Register of Historic Places in 1972. Public tours started in 1986.

Though the state park remained open, the historic site was closed on October 1, 2008. Jubilee College State Historic Site, as well as 17 other historic sites and state parks, were closed by Governor Rod Blagojevich to help close Illinois' multimillion-dollar budget deficit. The park was reopened by Blagojevich's successor, Pat Quinn, but closed again on October 9, 2009 due to staffing and budget shortages. In September 2022, the historic site reopened to the public.

== Flora and fauna ==
Jubilee College State Park is situated in the Illinoisan drift-plain. It has many near-level ridgetops, floodplains, and steep slope ravines, as well as a large restored prairie. Bedrock exposures include shale, sandstone, limestone, and coal.

Jubilee Creek is a tributary to Kickapoo Creek and runs through the park from northwest to southeast. The average width is 40 feet and average depth is four inches.

Many animals native to Illinois can be sighted in the park, including: deer, rabbits, squirrels, foxes, coyote, raccoons, wild turkeys, mink, muskrat, and beavers. Over 160 species of birds can be spotted.

== Recreation ==
The natural area of Jubilee College State Park contains over 40 miles of multi-use trails maintained by volunteer user groups. The trails were originated by equestrians but are shared with hikers and mountain bikers. The state park also contains various camping areas, for which reservations are suggested.
