= Rufus Wheelwright Clark =

American pastor and author (1813–1886)

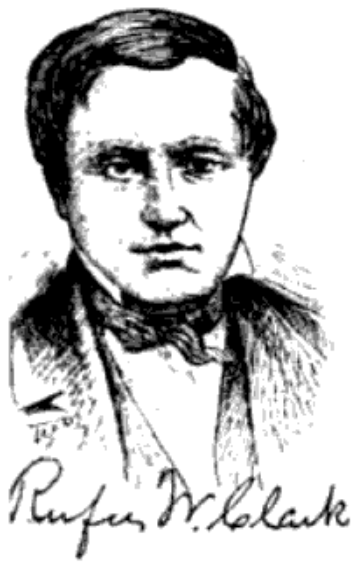
- Born: December 17, 1813; Newburyport, Massachusetts
- Died: August 9, 1886 (aged 72); Nantucket, Massachusetts
- Education: Andover Theological Seminary; Yale Divinity School
- Occupations: Clergyman, writer
- Spouse: Eliza Walton (m. 1843; died 1877)
- Children: 6

Rufus Wheelwright Clark (December 17, 1813 – August 9, 1886) was an American pastor and author.

== Biography ==
Clark, son of Thomas M. and Rebecca (Wheelwright) Clark, was born in Newburyport, Mass., December 17, 1813. At an early age he went to New York City as a clerk in a mercantile house, and while thus engaged became convinced of his duty to prepare for the ministry. He graduated from Yale College in 1838. He spent the year after graduation in the Andover Theological Seminary, and the succeeding year in the Yale Divinity School.

He was ordained and installed as pastor of the Second Presbyterian Church in Washington, D. C, January 7, 1842. He resigned that charge in the following November, to accept a call to the North (Congregational) Church in Portsmouth, N. H., over which he was installed on the 16th of that month. He spent nine years in Portsmouth, leaving there in November, 1851 to remove to East Boston, Mass., where he was settled over the Maverick (Congregational) Church, on December 3 of that year. After a pastorate of five years and four months, he went to Brooklyn, N.Y., where he was installed over the South Congregational Church, from April 14, 1857, to November 17, 1862. From December 10, 1862, until his resignation twenty years later, he held the pastorate of the First Reformed Church in Albany, N.Y.

As a pastor he was widely known through his question books for Sunday schools and other numerous contributions to religious literature. The most important of his published works, aside from those of a distinctly religious character, was his Heroes of Albany (1866, 8vo, pp. 870), written in commemoration of the sacrifices of the American Civil War. The degree of Doctor of Divinity was conferred on him by the University of the City of New York in 1862.

After resigning his charge at Albany, in 1882, he made his home, in feeble health, with one of his sons, on Staten Island, N.Y. He went to Nantucket, Mass., for the summer of 1886, and died there, August 9, in his 73rd year.

He married, June 14, 1843, Eliza, daughter of the Rev. William C. Walton, of Alexandria, Va., and Hartford, Conn.; she died May 21, 1877, leaving five sons and one daughter. Four of the sons were clergymen.

His mother's family was related to the Puritan clergyman John Wheelwright.

His brother Thomas M. Clark was also a minister and was Bishop of Rhode Island; another brother, Rev Dr Samuel Adam Clark, was also a minister.
