= Emmanuel Episcopal Church (Cumberland, Rhode Island) =

Coordinates: 41°58′46.2″N 71°26′50.3″W

Emmanuel Episcopal Church is an historic Episcopal parish founded in 1835 in Manville, Rhode Island, but now located in nearby Cumberland. It is a congregation of the Episcopal Diocese of Rhode Island.

In 2021, the church reported 554 members; in 2023, it reported 376 members. No membership statistics were reported in 2024 national parochial reports. Plate and pledge financial support reported by the church in 2024 was $245,932. Average Sunday Attendance (ASA) reported in 2024 was 94 persons. This was a relative decrease from ASA of 154 persons reported in 2017.

== History ==
=== From a Textile Village to the Church on the Hill ===
The Blackstone River powered the machinery of those textile mills that brought the Industrial Revolution to America. One such mill owned by Samuel Mann (or Man), who gave his name to the village of Manville in which his mill was located. Here, as in the other new mill villages that spread upriver from Samuel Slater’s original mill in Pawtucket, itinerant revivalists rather than settled churches provided only sporadic religious services for the workers in these early factories. Mann, himself a Quaker, found these “enthusiasts” distasteful and sought to replace them with a “sober religion.” He was clearly concerned not only for the souls of his workers but also for the discipline of his workforce when he wrote in 1835 to the Episcopal Bishop of Rhode Island to request a missionary. He offered to provide for the missionary lodging in a mill house, two new suits of clothes a year, and a salary of $300, to be collected at the mill's pay window at the rate of $6 a week. He also promised ongoing financial support for the building and maintaining of a church. The bishop sent the Rev. Ephraim Munroe to answer the call.

If some of these early operatives had emigrated from England, they had not been Anglicans there any more than their Yankee counterparts had been Episcopalians ere. Munroe found his congregation largely unfamiliar with the Prayer Book and uncertain how to use it. He could be sure, however, of a captive audience for his Sunday afternoon service because Mr. Mann himself attended and noted any absentees, who would next day be summoned to explain their whereabouts.

On Sunday mornings teachers instructed the children in reading and writing using the Bible and available primers; the only schooling these children would get, for they too labored in the mill along with their parents. Munroe claimed success in getting increasing numbers of the congregation to use the Prayer Book and participate in the services though the numbers of actual communicants remained very small.

The church survived the vicissitudes of 19th-century economic depressions, the Civil War, and a large influx of Roman Catholic French Canadians in the 1880s. It had always through this long period depended on the mill owners’ continuing financial support.

The Great Depression of 1929, however, bankrupted the Manville-Jenckes Mill, leaving the church to struggle through a very difficult time. It nevertheless celebrated its centennial in 1935 in the presence of the Right Rev. DeWolf Perry, who was not only Bishop of Rhode Island but also the Presiding Bishop of the American Episcopal Church. After World War II, however, the downhill trajectory resumed and membership sank to new lows.

=== Moving across the River ===
Meanwhile, across the Blackstone River in Cumberland Hill was an area experiencing rapid growth and was deemed an appropriate site for a new mission. To this Church of the Incarnation came the Rev. Walter Lyons, who conducted the first service of the new mission on July 20, 1958, at Cumberland Hill Elementary School. Less than a year later he could present to Bishop Higgins a group of 25 to be confirmed and received into the church, even providing for the women and girls in the group the white veils deemed appropriate for the ceremony.

The mission was at that point without a church while the church in Manville had received in 1958, for the first time in 23 years, an extensive redecoration. The two churches decided to merge as the Church of Emmanuel and the Incarnation, but, to avoid the expense of obtaining a new state charter, agreed subsequently to operate under Emmanuel’s existing charter of 1836 and to use its name. The first service of the joint congregations was held at Cumberland Hill School on 7 July 1959 but they now also could use the renovated church in Manville. The new church was thus able to celebrate as “Emmanuel” its 125th anniversary in 1960.

=== Building a New Church ===
At this point the Episcopal Diocese of Rhode Island intervened with the purchase of the present site on Nate Whipple Highway and a substantial contribution toward the cost of a new church. Records found at the Cumberland Town Hall indicate that the land was purchased for $1 from the heir, Ruth Cook, of the estate of Handel Cook. Work was begun on August 28, 1960, and on March 1, 1961, the new edifice was formally dedicated.

With the completion of a parish house adjoining the church, the Sunday school could meet on the premises rather than having to transport to the children to the local school for classes. Understandably the Manville parishioners were reluctant to leave their newly remodeled church but the new location was clearly more convenient for most parishioners. Both a stained glass window from Manville and the baptismal font were eventually incorporated into the new Emmanuel Church to retain continuity with that period of the church’s past. Thus established, the church continued to grow and prosper.

== See also ==
- Manville, Rhode Island
- Cumberland, Rhode Island
