= James De Wolf Perry =

American Episcopal clergyman and prelate (1871–1947)

The Most Reverend James De Wolf Perry III
- 18th Presiding Bishop of the Episcopal Church
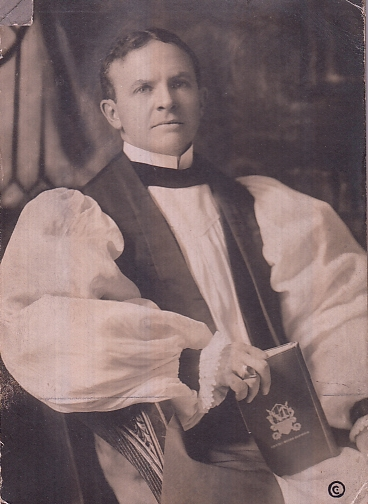
- Bishop Perry as a young man
- Church: Episcopal Church
- In office: 1930–1937
- Predecessor: Charles Palmerston Anderson
- Successor: Henry St. George Tucker
- Other post: Bishop of Rhode Island (1911–1946)

Orders
- Ordination: February 18, 1896 by William Lawrence
- Consecration: January 6, 1911 by Daniel Sylvester Tuttle
- Rank: Presiding Bishop

Personal details
- Born: November 3, 1871 Germantown, Philadelphia, Pennsylvania
- Died: March 20, 1947 (aged 75) Summerville, South Carolina
- Spouse: Edith Weir Perry
- Education: University of Pennsylvania; Harvard University; Episcopal Theological School

James DeWolf Perry (October 3, 1871 – March 20, 1947) was an American Episcopal clergyman and prelate. He was the 7th Bishop of Rhode Island (1911–1946) and the 18th Presiding Bishop of the Episcopal Church (1930–1937).

== Biography ==
The third of five children, Perry was born in the Germantown neighborhood of Philadelphia, Pennsylvania, to the Rev. James DeWolf Perry II and Elizabeth Russell Tyson. His father was rector of Calvary Church in Germantown; he was also a descendant of Captain Christopher Raymond Perry, (who was the father of Commodores Oliver Hazard Perry and Matthew C. Perry), and Senators William Bradford and James De Wolf, and was great great grandson of Lieutenant Benjamin Bourne who served in the American Revolution.

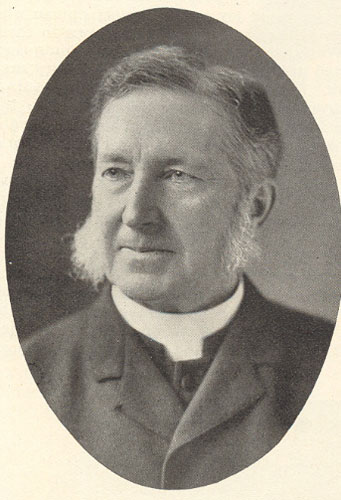
The Rev. James DeWolf Perry II, father of Bishop Perry

After graduating from Germantown Academy in 1887, he matriculated at the University of Pennsylvania and Harvard University, where he was an "able high-jumper." In 1895 he earned a Bachelor of Divinity from the Episcopal Theological School. Perry was ordained a deacon by Bishop William Lawrence on June 9, 1895, and a priest on February 18, 1896. He then served as a curate at Christ Church in Springfield, Massachusetts until 1897, when he was named rector of Christ Church in Fitchburg. During the Spanish–American War, he was chaplain of the 6th Massachusetts Infantry from 1898 to 1904. In 1904 he became rector of St. Paul's Church in New Haven. In 1908 he married Edith Dean Weir (daughter of John Ferguson Weir). She was an author and painter of miniatures. They had three children: James DeWolf, John Weir, and Beatrice Weir.

On September 21, 1910, Perry was elected the 7th Bishop of Rhode Island at age 39 and was consecrated on January 6, 1911, by Bishops Daniel Sylvester Tuttle, Leigh R. Brewer, and William Lawrence.

Perry was admitted as a member of the Rhode Island Society of the Cincinnati in 1915 and became president of the Society in 1921.

During World War I, he served as chief of Red Cross chaplains in France from 1918 to 1919.

On March 26, 1930, Perry was elected the 18th Presiding Bishop by the House of Bishops. He was the last Presiding Bishop to retain his diocesan jurisdiction while serving in the national post. In 1932, he accepted a 10 percent pay cut to help with the church's budget difficulties.

In August 1930, he was chosen to deliver the farewell sermon at the Lambeth Conference and invited to lay the cornerstone of St. Andrew's Cathedral in Aberdeen. Especially interested in foreign missions, he once spent five months visiting mission stations in the Philippines, China, Japan, and Hawaii.

The French government awarded him the Legion of Honor in 1934. At the 1934 General Convention of the church, there was a campaign to have Perry made an archbishop, an office that did not exist within the Episcopal Church, which led to his portrait by Jerry Farnsworth being on the cover of Time magazine.

In a rare instance, he participated directly in politics in 1937 when he accepted an appointment to the Republican Party's Committee on Program, which was charged with drafting "a declaration of principles to redefine the party's stand on political and economic issues."

He retired as Presiding Bishop in 1937, and as Bishop of Rhode Island in 1946. Perry died at the age of 75 from a heart attack in Summerville, South Carolina.

== See also ==
- List of presiding bishops of the Episcopal Church in the United States of America
- List of Episcopal bishops of the United States
- Historical list of the Episcopal bishops of the United States

Episcopal Church (USA) titles
Preceded by Charles Palmerston Anderson	18th Presiding Bishop; March 26, 1930 – December 31, 1937	Succeeded by Henry St. George Tucker
Preceded by William N. McVickar	7th Bishop of Rhode Island; 1911–1946	Succeeded by Granville G. Bennett
