= John Prentiss Kewley Henshaw =

American bishop

The Right Reverend John Prentiss Kewley Henshaw
- Bishop of Rhode Island
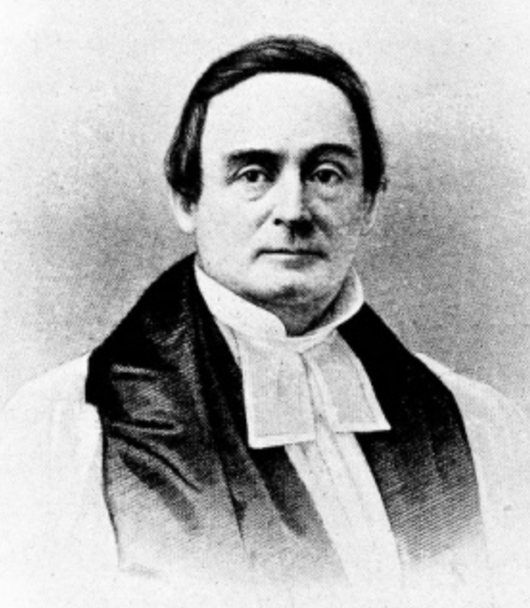
- Church: Episcopal Church
- Diocese: Rhode Island
- In office: 1843–1852
- Predecessor: Alexander Viets Griswold
- Successor: Thomas M. Clark

Orders
- Ordination: June 13, 1816 by John Henry Hobart
- Consecration: August 11, 1843 by Thomas Church Brownell

Personal details
- Born: June 13, 1792 Middletown, Connecticut, United States
- Died: July 20, 1852 (aged 60) Frederick, Maryland, United States
- Buried: Grace Church (Providence, Rhode Island)
- Parents: Daniel Henshaw & Sarah Esther Prentiss
- Spouse: Mary Gorham
- Children: 8

John Prentiss Kewley Henshaw (June 13, 1792 – July 20, 1852) was the fourth Bishop of Rhode Island in the Episcopal Church in the United States of America, and the first to hold that position alone.

== Early life ==
Henshaw was born in Middletown, Connecticut, and raised in the Congregational Church. He attended Middlebury College, graduating in 1808, and spent an additional year at Harvard College in 1809. He converted to the Episcopal Church and Bishop Alexander Griswold made him a lay reader in charge of a church in Marblehead, Massachusetts.

== Ministry ==
Henshaw was ordained deacon on his 21st birthday in 1813 and for three years later served at St. Ann's Church in Brooklyn. After ordination as a priest on his 24th birthday in 1816, he became rector of St. Peter's Church in Baltimore, where he served for seventeen years. During his time in Baltimore, Henshaw befriended the Rev. William Levington, who had established the first African American Episcopal congregation south of the Mason-Dixon line in 1824. However, Henshaw was twice passed over during elections for bishop of the Episcopal Diocese of Maryland.

In 1843, the Episcopal Diocese of Rhode Island elected Henshaw its bishop, and he became that diocese's first bishop not also responsible for another diocese. Consecrated on August 11, 1843, by Bishops Thomas Church Brownell, Benjamin Treadwell Onderdonk, and John Henry Hopkins, Rt. Rev. Henshaw became the 41st bishop in the ECUSA. While serving as Rhode Island's bishop, Henshaw was also the rector of Grace Church in Providence, and managed to pay off its mortgage.

== Death and legacy ==
Henshaw suffered a fit of apoplexy on July 19, 1852, in Frederick County, Maryland, while substituting for Bishop William Whittingham, who was traveling in Europe. He died the following day, and his body was returned to Rhode Island for burial in Grace Church. Henshaw had married Mary Gorham Henshaw (1791-1881) who survived him, as did six sons and two daughters (two sons dying before their parents). By the end of the century, another church in Providence, All Saints Memorial Church, was built as a memorial to him.

== Notes ==
Episcopal Church (USA) titles
Preceded by Alexander Viets Griswold	Bishop of Rhode Island; 1843–1852	Succeeded by Thomas March Clark
