= John Seville Higgins =

English-American bishop

The Right Reverend John Seville Higgins D.D.
- Bishop of Rhode Island
- Church: Episcopal church
- Diocese: Rhode Island
- In office: 1955–1972
- Predecessor: Granville Gaylord Bennett
- Successor: Frederick H. Belden
- Previous post: Coadjutor Bishop of Rhode Island (1953-1955)

Orders
- Ordination: November 1, 1931 by George Craig Stewart
- Consecration: February 4, 1953 by Henry Knox Sherrill

Personal details
- Born: April 14, 1904 London, England
- Died: December 28, 1992 (aged 88)
- Denomination: Anglican
- Spouse: Florence Marion Laird

John Seville Higgins (April 14, 1904 - December 28, 1992) was bishop of the Episcopal Diocese of Rhode Island, serving from 1953 to 1954 as coadjutor and from 1955 to 1972 as diocesan.

== Biography ==
Higgins was born on April 14, 1904, in London, England. He studied at Oberlin College and graduated in 1928. He trained for the ordained ministry at the Western Theological Seminary and graduated in 1931. He was made deacon on May 1, 1931, and ordained priest on November 1 of the same year. He served parishes in Nevada, Illinois and Minnesota and in 1948 became rector of St Martin's Church in Providence, Rhode Island.

He was elected Bishop Coadjutor of Rhode Island in November 1952 and consecrated on February 4, 1953, with Presiding Bishop Henry Knox Sherrill as chief consecrator. He succeeded Granville Bennett as diocesan Bishop of Rhode Island on January 1, 1955. During his time as bishop, particularly in the 1950s, the diocese experienced rapid growth. Bishop Higgins was also instrumental in rebuilding of the diocesan headquarters in Providence. His spirit of ecumenism was effective in creating the Rhode Island State Council of Churches. He retired on June 1, 1972, and died in 1992.

== Bibliography ==
- The Expansion of the Anglican Communion
- One Faith and Fellowship
- This Means of Grace
- Hope of Glory
- The Future of the Anglican Communion (1954)
