= Edward Bass =

American Episcopal bishop (1726–1803)

The Right Reverend Edward Bass D.D.
- Bishop of Massachusetts
- Church: Episcopal Church
- Diocese: Massachusetts
- Elected: May 24, 1796
- In office: 1797–1803
- Successor: Samuel Parker

Orders
- Ordination: May 24, 1752 by Thomas Sherlock
- Consecration: May 7, 1797 by William White

Personal details
- Born: April 17, 1726 Dorchester, Province of Massachusetts Bay
- Died: September 10, 1803 (aged 77) Newburyport, Massachusetts, United States
- Buried: St Paul's Church, Newburyport, Massachusetts
- Denomination: Anglican
- Parents: Joseph Bass & Elizabeth Breck
- Spouse: Sarah Beck
- Education: Harvard University

Edward Bass (November 23, 1726 – September 10, 1803) was the first American Episcopal bishop of the Diocese of Massachusetts and second bishop of the Diocese of Rhode Island.

== Biography ==
Bass attended Harvard University, graduating in 1744. He taught and preached in Congregationalist churches, then went to England to be ordained by the bishop of London in May 1752. He had been appointed assistant at St. Paul's Episcopal Church, Newburyport, Massachusetts, in 1749 by the new rector, Matthias Plant, whom he followed as rector in 1753, serving until his death in 1803.

Bass considered himself neutral during the American Revolution, but since he omitted from the church service all reference to the royal family and the British government, he was accused by the Society for the Propagation of the Gospel in Foreign Parts of supporting the colonists and lost his financial support. In May 1789, the first convention of the Diocese of Massachusetts, meeting in Salem, elected Bass bishop of Massachusetts and Rhode Island but his parish rejected the election because lay delegates did not participate. In 1796 in Boston, Bass was unanimously re-elected bishop of Massachusetts, Rhode Island and Maine, with lay participation, and was consecrated in Philadelphia on May 7, 1797. He also oversaw the churches in New Hampshire and is listed by the Diocese of Rhode Island as its second bishop. Edward Bass was the 7th bishop consecrated for the Episcopal Church. Aged 71 at the time of his consecration, he is the oldest person consecrated bishop in the Episcopal Church.

Bass died on September 10, 1803, just before he was to travel to Portland, Maine. James Morss in his diary, wrote of him, "He felt ill on Saturday and felt he could not preach Sunday night and was concerned about my conducting the service without him as I had not done so before, but he was dead before Sunday."

== Consecrators ==
- William White, 2nd bishop of the Episcopal Church, serving Pennsylvania, and 1st and 4th Presiding Bishops
- Samuel Provoost, 3rd bishop of the Episcopal Church, first bishop of New York
- Thomas John Claggett, 5th bishop of the Episcopal Church, first bishop of Maryland

== See also ==
- Historical list of bishops of the Episcopal Church in the United States of America

== Notes and references ==
Episcopal Church (USA) titles
New title	1st Bishop of Massachusetts; 1797–1803	Succeeded by Samuel Parker
Preceded by Samuel Seabury	2nd Bishop of Rhode Island; 1797–1803	Succeeded by Alexander Viets Griswold
