= Episcopal Eastern Diocese =

Diocese based in the United States

Coordinates: 42°21′17.86″N 71°3′35.07″W

At the founding of The Protestant Episcopal Church in the United States, all of New England was considered one diocese — the Diocese of Connecticut — led by Bishop Samuel Seabury. In 1811, the congregations in Massachusetts petitioned the General Convention to form a separate diocese consisting of the states of Massachusetts (including Maine), Rhode Island, New Hampshire, and Vermont. Titled the Eastern Diocese of the Episcopal Church in the United States of America, its first bishop was Alexander Viets Griswold.

Vermont elected its own bishop in 1832, and separated from the Eastern Diocese. New Hampshire also separated in 1832. The Eastern Diocese ceased to exist in 1843, when Rhode Island and Maine also elected bishops, following the death of Bishop Griswold.

== See also ==
- Episcopal Diocese of Massachusetts
- List of Episcopal bishops
- Ecclesiastical provinces and dioceses of the Episcopal Church § Dioceses no longer in existence
