= Granville Gaylord Bennett (bishop) =

American bishop

The Right Reverend Granville Gaylord Bennett
- Bishop of Rhode Island
- Church: Episcopal church
- Diocese: Rhode Island
- In office: 1946–1954
- Predecessor: James De Wolf Perry
- Successor: John Seville Higgins
- Previous posts: Coadjutor Bishop of Duluth (1920-1921); Bishop of Duluth (1921-1932); Auxiliary Bishop of Rhode Island (1932-1939); Suffragan Bishop of Rhode Island (1939-1946)

Orders
- Ordination: June 9, 1907 by Anson Rogers Graves
- Consecration: November 17, 1920 by Daniel S. Tuttle

Personal details
- Born: November 28, 1882 Deadwood, South Dakota, U.S.
- Died: October 3, 1975 (aged 92) Barrington, Rhode Island, U.S.
- Buried: Forest Chapel Cemetery, Barrington
- Denomination: Anglican
- Parents: Granville Gaylord Bennett & Mary Dawson
- Spouse: Margaret Graves (1907-1920); Mary Roswell Horr (1935-1975)
- Children: 3

Granville Gaylord Bennett (November 28, 1882 – October 3, 1975) was the second Bishop of Duluth and the eighth Bishop of Rhode Island in the Episcopal Church in the United States of America.

== Biography ==
Bennett was born in Deadwood, South Dakota on November 28, 1882, the son of Judge Granville Gaylord Bennett, an American lawyer who served as a justice of the Supreme Court for the Dakota Territory and as a delegate to the United States House of Representatives, and Mary Ann Bennett née Dawson. He studied at the University of Nebraska and later at the Seabury-Western Theological Seminary. Bennett was ordained priest in 1907. He worked as a missionary among the Ojibwe Indians in Montana and Nebraska. He also served as rector of St Paul's Church in Minneapolis. He had two sisters, Estelline Rea Bennett (1868 - 1948), author of OLD DEADWOOD DAYS, and Helen Marie Bennett (1872 - 1962), an American journalist, businesswoman, and writer who organized the four women's world's fairs of the 1920s. An older brother, Robert Dawson Bennett (1878 - 1892) was killed in a tragic hunting accident at age 14.

In 1920 he was elected Coadjutor Bishop of Duluth. He was consecrated in November of that same year by Presiding Bishop Daniel S. Tuttle. He succeeded as diocesan bishop in 1921. In 1931, Bennett was elected Auxiliary Bishop to Bishop James De Wolf Perry of Rhode Island and in 1938 he was elected Suffragan Bishop of Rhode Island. On November 19, 1946, he was elected as diocesan Bishop of Rhode Island. He remained in Rhode Island till 1954, when he resigned. Upon his death, he was the oldest Episcopal bishop by consecration date. Bennett was married twice, first to Margaret Graves whom he married in 1907 and together had 2 daughters, and later, after her death in 1920, married Mary Roswell Horr in 1935, with whom he had a son.
