= Alexander Viets Griswold =

19th-century American Episcopal bishop

The Most Reverend Alexander Viets Griswold
- 5th Presiding Bishop of the Episcopal Church
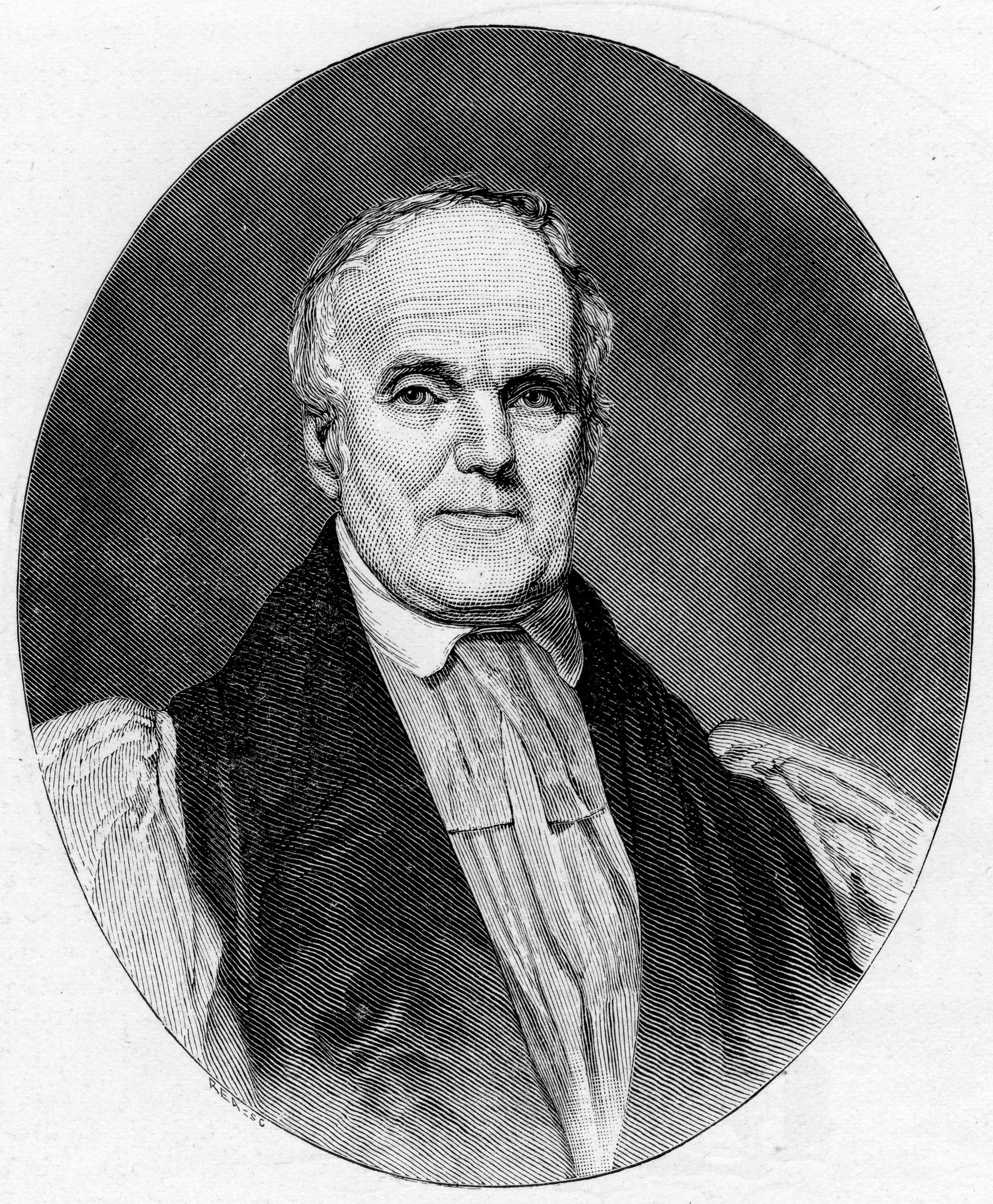
- Church: Episcopal Church
- In office: 1836–1843
- Predecessor: William White
- Successor: Philander Chase
- Other posts: Bishop of Massachusetts (1811-1843); Bishop of Rhode Island (1811-1843)

Orders
- Ordination: October 1, 1795 by Samuel Seabury
- Consecration: May 29, 1811 by William White

Personal details
- Born: April 22, 1766 Simsbury, Connecticut Colony
- Died: February 15, 1843 (aged 76) Boston, Massachusetts, United States
- Buried: Old Village Cemetery
- Denomination: Episcopal
- Parents: Elisha Griswold & Eunice Viets
- Spouse: Elizabeth Mitchelson
- Children: 12
- Education: Brown University, Princeton University, Harvard University

Alexander Viets Griswold (April 22, 1766 – February 15, 1843) was the 5th Presiding Bishop of the Episcopal Church in the United States from 1836 until 1843. He was also the Bishop of the Eastern Diocese, which included all of New England with the exception of the Episcopal Diocese of Connecticut. Griswold was an evangelical Episcopalian.

== Biography ==
Born in Simsbury, Connecticut, Alexander Viets Griswold was the son of Elisha Griswold and Eunice Viets. Griswold died in Boston, Massachusetts. He married Elizabeth Mitchelson on 6 May 1785 or 1786 at Scotland (now Bloomfield), Connecticut. They had 12 children. His sister was the painter Eunice Pinney.

Griswold received the degree of D.D. from Brown in 1810, from Princeton in 1811, and from Harvard in 1812.

Griswold was ordained deacon on June 7, 1795, and priest on October 1, 1795. Griswold served three small churches in Litchfield County and also taught school. Griswold was chosen rector of St. Michael's Church, Bristol, Rhode Island, in 1804. He was elected bishop and consecrated on May 29, 1811. As the eldest serving bishop, he also served as the Episcopal Church's fifth Presiding Bishop from July 17, 1836, until his death.

Griswold also served as Chancellor of Brown University from 1815 to 1828. He was a cousin of both Frank Griswold and Sheldon M. Griswold, both Episcopal bishops.

When he died in 1843, he was interred in Trinity Church on Summer Street in Boston. In 1876, the bodies of Griswold and his family were removed to the churchyard outside St. Paul's Church, in Dedham, Massachusetts.

== Works ==
Griswold wrote the hymn Holy Father, great Creator. He also published Discourses on the Most Important Doctrines and Duties of the Christian Religion (1830); The Reformation and the Apostolic Office (1843); and Remarks on Social Prayer Meetings (1858). His memoirs were published by Dr. J. S. Stone. Some of his papers and a lock of his hair are stored in the University Library, University of Rhode Island.

== Honors ==
The former Griswold College in Davenport, Iowa, was named in honor of Griswold.

== See also ==
- List of presiding bishops of the Episcopal Church in the United States of America
- List of Episcopal bishops of the United States
- Historical list of the Episcopal bishops of the United States

Episcopal Church (USA) titles
Preceded by William White	5th Presiding Bishop; 1836–1843	Succeeded by Philander Chase
Preceded by Samuel Parker	Bishop of Massachusetts; 1811–1843	Succeeded by Manton Eastburn
Preceded by Edward Bass	Bishop of Rhode Island; 1811–1843	Succeeded by John Prentiss Kewly Henshaw
