= Episcopal Church in Micronesia =

Area mission of the Episcopal Church in Micronesia

Coordinates: 13.48303°N 144.77319°E

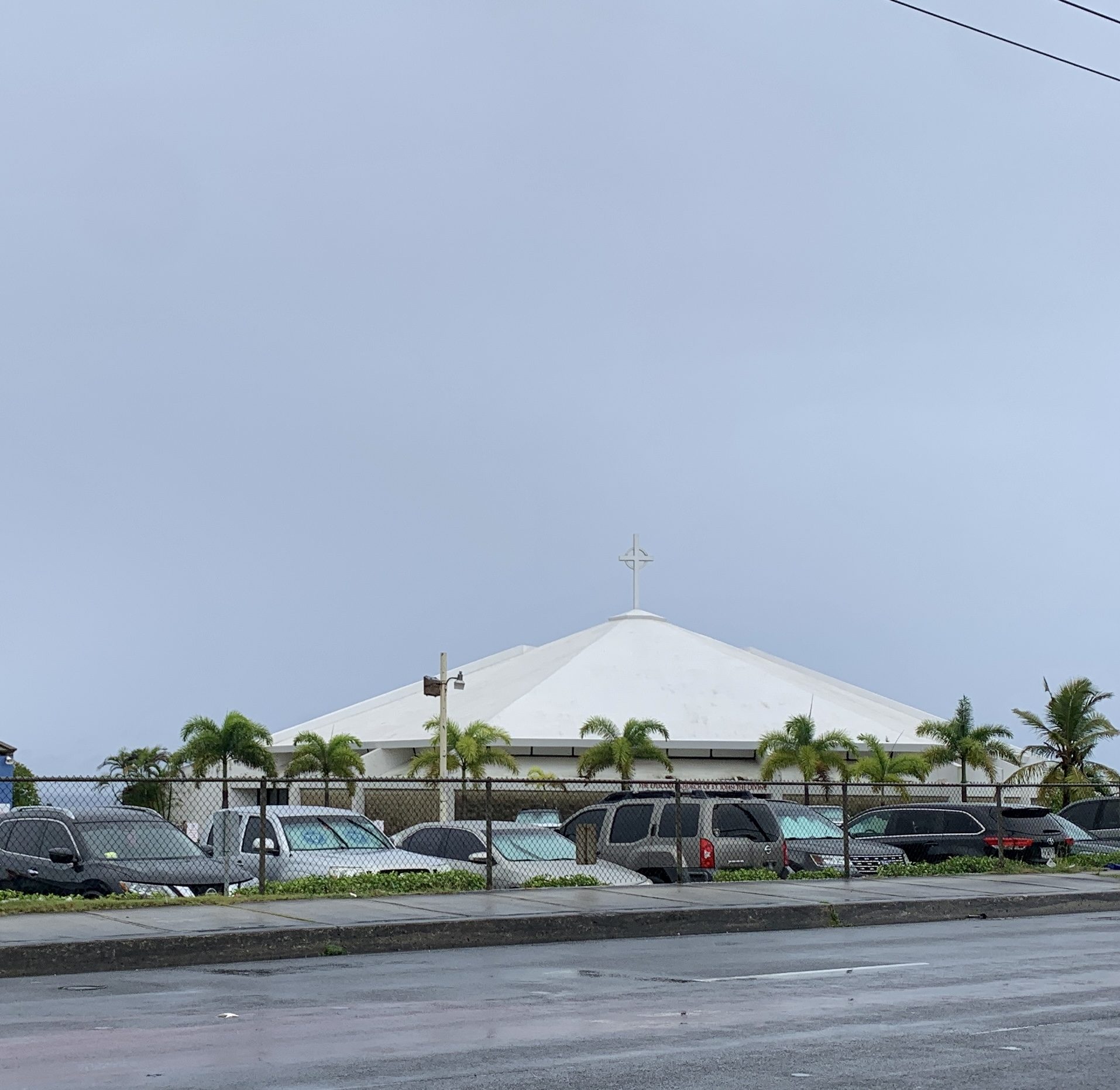
Episcopal Church of St. John the Divine

The Episcopal Church in Micronesia was a mission within Province VIII of the Episcopal Church. At its dissolution, it had four congregations, three on Guam and one on Saipan, in the Commonwealth of the Northern Mariana Islands, as well as St. John's Episcopal School in Upper Tumon, Guam. The 2021 parochial reports indicated two parishes and 218 members. In 2023, the diocese reported average Sunday attendance (ASA) of 78 persons. The most recent membership statistics (2023) showed 236.

The Episcopal Church of Micronesia was absorbed into the Episcopal Diocese of Hawaii in 2024.

Congregations:

- St. Andrew's by the Philippine Sea, Agat, Guam
- St. John the Divine Church, Tamuning, Guam
- St. Michael and All Angels church, Dededo, Guam
- St. Paul's Episcopal Mission, Chalan Kanoa, Saipan, Commonwealth of the Northern Mariana Islands
