= Episcopal Diocese of Duluth =

Diocese in Minnesota, USA

Coordinates: 46°48′22″N 92°4′21″W

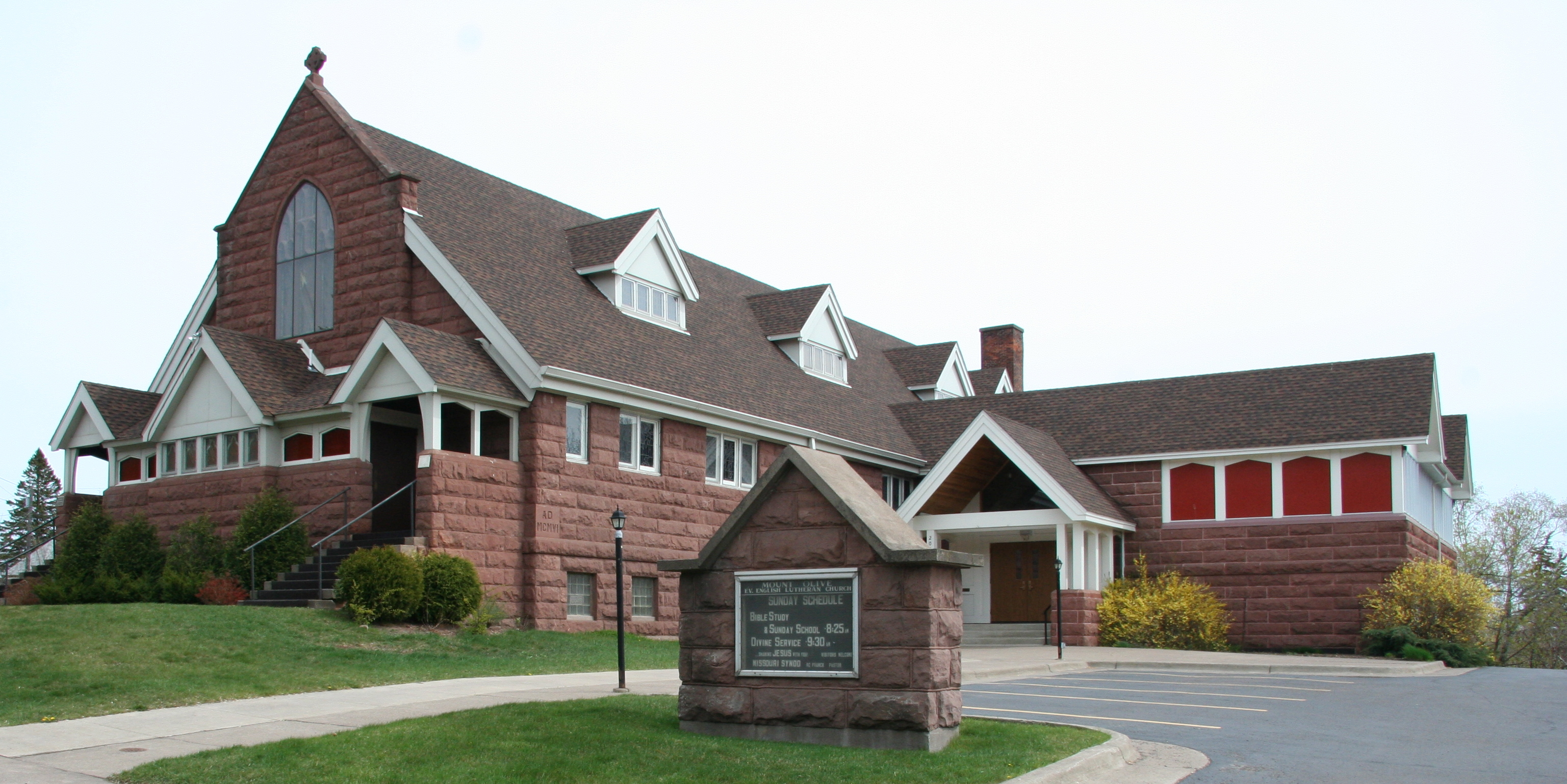
The former Trinity Episcopal Cathedral, built in 1906 in Duluth, Minnesota

The Episcopal Diocese of Duluth was a diocese of the Episcopal Church in the United States of America. The diocese was created as the Missionary District of Duluth in 1895 as a result of the division of the Diocese of Minnesota. The Missionary District was reconstituted as a diocese at its twelfth annual convocation on June 19, 1907. The diocese reunited with the Diocese of Minnesota in 1944. The former cathedral in Duluth, Minnesota was sold to a Lutheran church in 1956.

== Bishops of the Diocese ==
- James Dow Morrison, Missionary Bishop (1896–1906), Diocesan bishop (1907–1921)
- Granville Gaylord Bennett (1921–1933)
- Benjamin Tibbets Kemerer, Coadjutor bishop (1930-1933, Diocesan bishop (1933–1943)
