= Episcopal Diocese of Rhode Island =

Episcopal Church diocese in the US

Diocese of Rhode Island

Location
- Country: United States
- Territory: Rhode Island
- Ecclesiastical province: Province I

Statistics
- Congregations: 52 (2025)
- Members: 11,668 (2025)

Information
- Denomination: Episcopal Church
- Established: November 18, 1790
- Cathedral: Cathedral of St John

Current leadership
- Bishop: W. Nicholas Knisely

Map
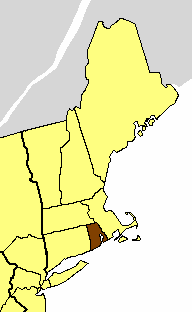
- Location of the Diocese of Rhode Island

Website
- episcopalri.org

The Episcopal Diocese of Rhode Island is a diocese of the Episcopal Church in the United States of America, encompassing the state of Rhode Island. It is one of seven New England dioceses that make up Province 1.

The closed Cathedral of St. John at 271 North Main Street in the see city of Providence was the former episcopal seat. The bishop is the Right Reverend W. Nicholas Knisely, the thirteenth office holder.

The diocese reported 17,618 members in 2015 and 11,668 members in 2025. Plate and pledge income reported for the 52 congregations in 2025 was $8,797,974. Average Sunday attendance (ASA) in 2025 was 3,268 persons. This was a relative decrease from ASA of 4,889 persons reported in 2015.

== History ==
The diocese was founded in 1790 by two clergy and five members of the laity, representatives of the four charter churches of the diocese, King's Church in Providence (1722), Trinity Church in Newport (1698), St. Paul's in North Kingstown (1707), and St. Michael's in Bristol (1720). Without sufficient resources to support a bishop of their own, they elected Samuel Seabury, who was bishop of Connecticut, to hold the office of bishop of Rhode Island as well. Under Rhode Island's third bishop, Alexander Viets Griswold, the Episcopal Church in Rhode Island expanded from 200 communicants in four parishes to almost 2,000 in seventeen parishes. This growth continued under the next two bishops, John P. K. Henshaw and Thomas M. Clark, and this trend was supported by the immigration of many English Anglicans. By the end of the 19th century, the diocese had grown to 35 parishes.

In the first part of the 20th century, the Episcopal Church in Rhode Island focused on urban ministry with a focus on social concerns, led by Bishop William N. McVickar. The first deaconess was ordained in 1890, and from 1910 to 1914 the number of women serving in this position and ordained by Bishop James D. Perry had grown from one to seven. Under Perry and his successor, Gaylord G. Bennett, the number of parishes continued to grow.

From 1955 to 1972, the diocese was led by John Seville Higgins, who started campus ministries and a number of other missions. Bishop Frederick H. Belden led the church through the transitions occasioned by the ordination of women to the priesthood, ordaining Jo-Ann J. Drake to the transitional diaconate in 1977 and to the priesthood in 1978, (Patrica A. Smith, ordained deacon by Bishop Belden in 1976, continued her studies for the priesthood and was ordained in 1980) and adoption of the 1979 Book of Common Prayer. Belden was succeeded by George Hunt, who served as bishop from 1980 to 1994. Hunt led a crusade for accountability by the state government on the issues of corruption, organized crime and gambling. He also insisted that the process for ordination in the diocese not discriminate against anyone on the basis of gender or sexual orientation. In 1996, Geralyn Wolf was consecrated, becoming one of the few women serving as a diocesan bishop.

There are a few parishes with a sizable percentage of African-American parishioners, and some congregations that have become the spiritual homes for people who have fled the civil war in Liberia. There is an active Spanish-speaking congregation in Central Falls and another in Cranston. Most congregations make a point of openly welcoming gay and lesbian members.

== Bishops of Rhode Island ==
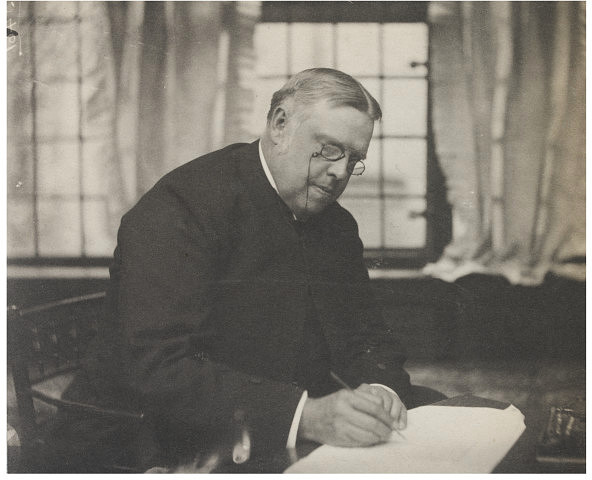
Bishop McVickar

These are the bishops who have served the Diocese of Rhode Island:

1. Samuel Seabury (1790–1796)
2. Edward Bass (1798–1803)
3. Alexander Viets Griswold (1811–1843)
4. John P. K. Henshaw (1843–1852)
5. Thomas March Clark (1854–1903)
  * William N. McVickar, Coadjutor Bishop (1898–1903)
6. William N. McVickar (1903–1910)
7. James DeWolf Perry (1911–1946)
  * Granville G. Bennett, Suffragan Bishop (elected 1939)
8. Granville G. Bennett (1946–1954)
  * John S. Higgins, Coadjutor Bishop (1953–1955)
9. John Seville Higgins (1955–1972)
  * Frederick H. Belden, Coadjutor Bishop (1971–1972)
10. Frederick H. Belden (1972–1979)
11. George N. Hunt, III (1980–1994)
12. Geralyn Wolf (1996–2012)
13. W. Nicholas Knisely (2012–present)

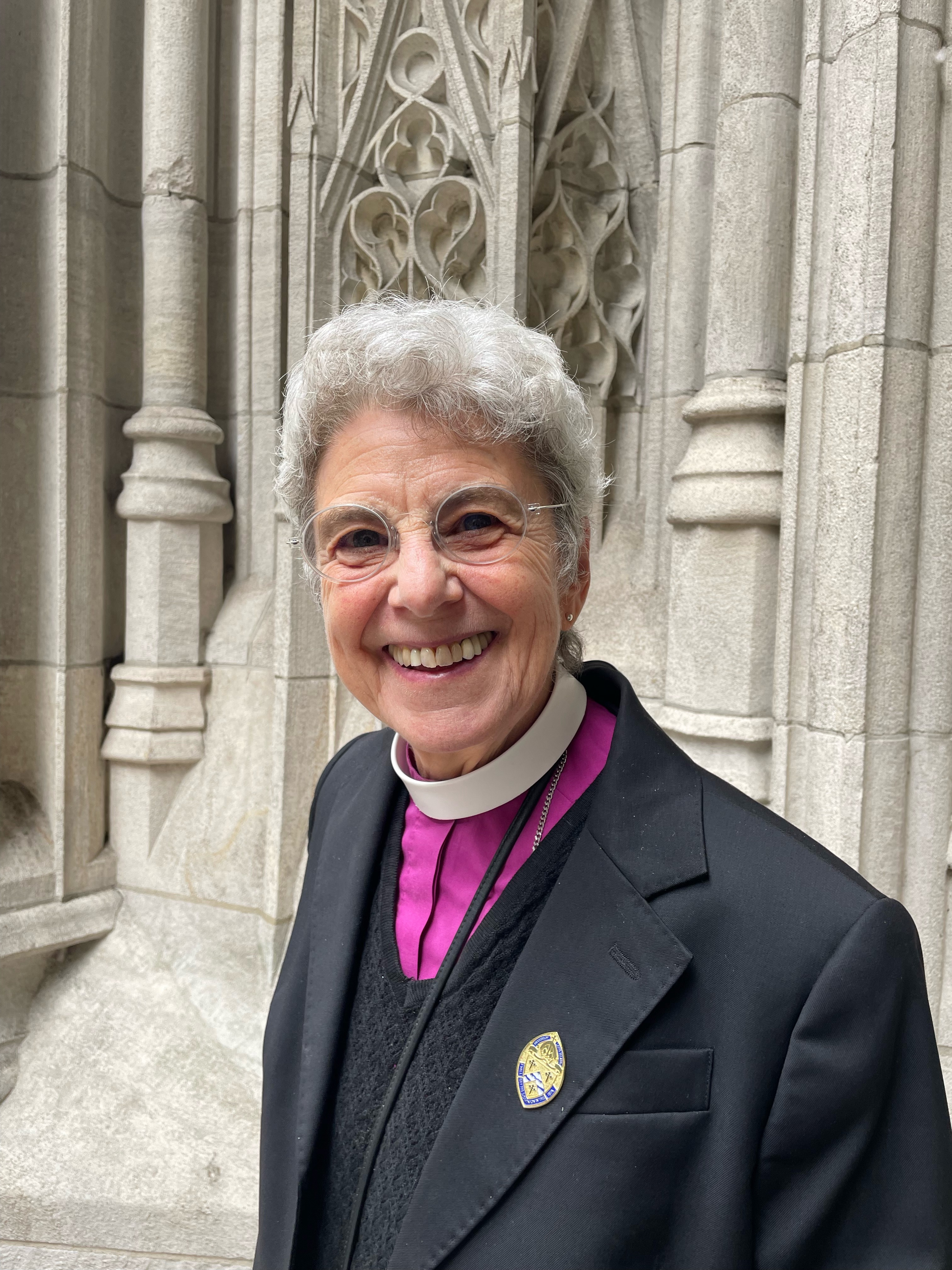
Bishop Wolf

== Churches of Rhode Island ==
=== Bristol County ===
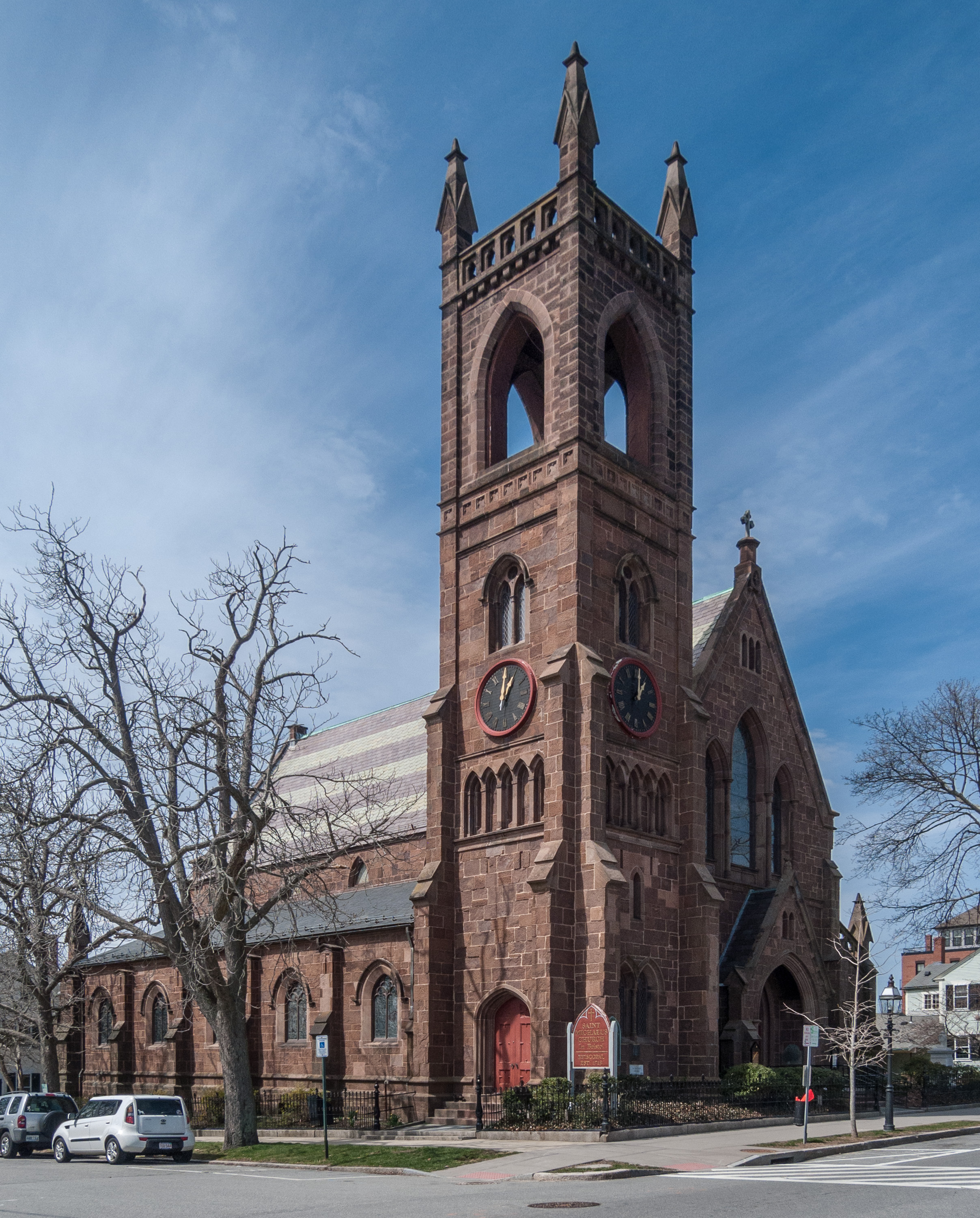
St. Michael's Episcopal Church, Bristol

- St. John's Episcopal Church, Barrington
- St. Matthew's Episcopal Church, Barrington
- St. Michael's Episcopal Church, Bristol
- St. Mark's Episcopal Church, Warren - closed May 2010

=== Kent County ===
- Church of St. Andrew and St. Philip, Coventry
- St. Francis Episcopal Church, Coventry
- St. Matthias's Episcopal Church, Coventry
- St. Luke's Episcopal Church, East Greenwich
- St. Mark's, Warwick
- St. Mary's Episcopal Church, Warwick
- All Saints' Episcopal Church, Warwick
- St. Barnabas Episcopal Church, Warwick

=== Newport County ===
- St. Matthew's Parish, Jamestown
- St. Andrew's-by-the-Sea, Compton
- Church of the Holy Cross (Middletown, Rhode Island)
- St. Columba's Chapel (Middletown, Rhode Island) homepage
- St. George's School, Middletown
- Emmanuel Church (Newport, Rhode Island) homepage
- St. George's Episcopal Church, Newport - closed circa 2010
- Trinity Church (Newport, Rhode Island) homepage
- Zabriskie Memorial Church of St. John the Evangelist Church, Newport
- St. Mary's Episcopal Church, Portsmouth
- St. Paul's, Portsmouth
- Holy Trinity Church, Tiverton

=== Providence County ===
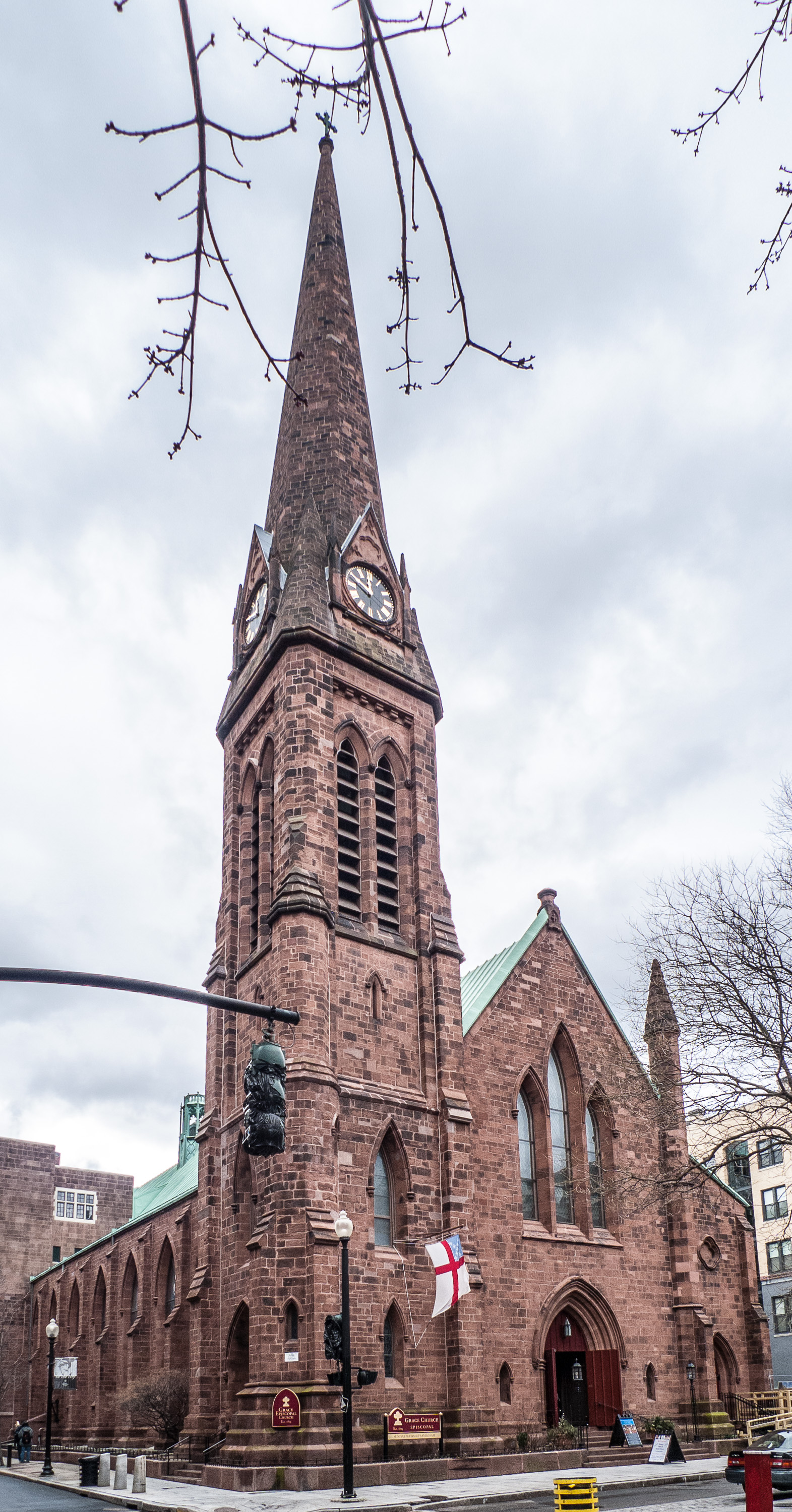
Grace Episcopal Church, Providence

- St. George's Episcopal Church, Central Falls
- St. David's on-the-Hill Episcopal Church, Cranston
- Church of the Transfiguration, Edgewood
- Church of the Ascension, Cranston
- Trinity Church, Cranston
- Emmanuel Episcopal Church, Cumberland homepage
- St. John's Episcopal Church, Ashton (Cumberland)
- Church of the Epiphany, Rumford (East Providence) homepage
- St. Mary's Episcopal Church, East Providence
- St. Thomas, Greenville
- Christ Church, Lincoln
- St. James, North Providence
- St. Alban's Episcopal Church, Centerdale (North Providence)
- Trinity Episcopal Church, North Scituate
- Calvary Episcopal Church, Pascoag
- St. Luke's, Pawtucket
- Church of the Advent, Pawtucket
- Good Shepherd, Pawtucket
- St. Paul's Episcopal Church, Pawtucket homepage
- St. Martin's, Pawtucket
- All Saints' Memorial Church, Providence
- St. Martin's Episcopal Church, Providence homepage
- Grace Church (Providence, Rhode Island)
- S. Stephen's Church, Providence homepage
- Cathedral of St. John, Providence (closed)
- Church of the Redeemer, Providence
- Church of the Messiah, Providence (closed)
- St. Peter's and St. Andrew's Church, Providence homepage
- St. Mark's, Riverside
- St. Michael & Grace, Rumford
- St. James's, Woonsocket

=== Washington County ===
- St. Ann's by-the Sea Episcopal Church, Block island
- Church of the Holy Spirit, Charlestown
- Saint Elizabeth's, Hope Valley (Hopkinton)
- St. Augustine's Episcopal Church, Kingston
- St. Peter's by-the-Sea Episcopal Church, Narragansett
- St. Paul's Episcopal Church, Wickford, North Kingstown
- Chapel of St. John the Divine, Sauderstown
- Church of the Ascension, Wakefield
- Christ Church, Westerly
- St. Thomas's, Alton (Wood River Junction)

== See also ==
- Historical list of bishops of the Episcopal Church in the United States of America
