= Sam Byron Hulsey =

American Anglican bishop (1932–2020)

The Right Reverend Sam Byron Hulsey
- Bishop of Northwest Texas
- Church: Episcopal Church
- Diocese: Northwest Texas
- Elected: August 23, 1980
- In office: 1980–1997
- Predecessor: Willis R. Henton
- Successor: C. Wallis Ohl Jr.

Orders
- Ordination: January 25, 1959 by Joseph Harte
- Consecration: December 13, 1980 by John Allin

Personal details
- Born: February 14, 1932 Fort Worth, Texas, United States
- Died: August 6, 2020 (aged 88) Selby Hill, Parker County, Texas, United States
- Denomination: Anglican
- Parents: Simeon Hardin Hulsey & Ruth Selby
- Spouse: Linda Louise Johnson (m. 1959; died 2001) Isabelle B. Newberry (m. 2002)
- Children: 2

Sam Byron Hulsey (February 14, 1932 – August 6, 2020) was bishop of the Episcopal Diocese of Northwest Texas, serving from 1980 to 1997.

== Early life and education ==
Hulsey was born on February 14, 1932, to Simeon Hardin Hulsey and Ruth Selby in the old All Saints’ Hospital in Fort Worth, Texas. He graduated from Paschal High School and later studied at Washington and Lee University in Lexington, Virginia from where he graduated with a Bachelor of Arts in English in 1953. He pursued graduate studies at St. Andrew's University in Scotland before becoming a student at the Virginia Theological Seminary in Alexandria, Virginia, graduating with a Master of Divinity in 1958. He also studied at St. Andrew's Scotland and was awarded honorary degrees by Virginia Seminary, The University of the South at Sewanee, Tenn., and the Episcopal Seminary of the Southwest in Austin.

== Ordained ministry ==
Hulsey was ordained deacon on June 18, 1958, and priest on January 25, 1959 by the Suffragan Bishop of Dallas Joseph Harte. He served as curate of St John's Church in Corsicana, Texas from 1958 to 1960 and later as its rector between 1960 and 1963. Between 1961 and 1963, he was also dean of the south in the Diocese of Dallas. He was also assistant director of Christian education and rector of St Michael and All Angels' Church in Dallas, Texas from 1963 until 1966. In 1966, he became rector of St Matthew's Church and headmaster of the parochial school in Pampa, Texas. He was also subsequently priest-in-charge of All Saints' Church in Perryton, Texas between 1966 and 1973. He also was rector of St David Church in Nashville, Tennessee between 1973 and 1978 and then of Holy Trinity Church in Midland, Texas from 1978 until 1980.

== Bishop ==
His career culminated in his tenure as bishop of the Diocese of Northwest Texas from 1980 to 1997. He was elected on the sixth ballot at St Paul's Church in Lubbock, Texas on August 23, 1980, and was consecrated on December 13, 1980 at the civic center of Lubbock, Texas by Presiding Bishop John Allin. The diocesan offices in Lubbock are in the Sam Byron Hulsey Episcopal Center. After his retirement, he moved back to his hometown of Fort Worth. There he served as assisting bishop in the Diocese of Fort Worth.: Hulsey died on August 6, 2020, at Selby Hill, his beloved family homestead in Parker County. He was 88 years old.

== Family ==
Hulsey married Linda Louise Johnson on October 3, 1959 and together they had a son and a daughter. Linda died in 2001 after a long battle with Alzheimer’s disease. He married Isabelle B. Newberry in 2002.

== See also ==
- List of Episcopal bishops of the United States
- Historical list of the Episcopal bishops of the United States
