= Charles G. Marmion =

American bishop

The Right Reverend Charles Gresham Marmion D.D.
- Bishop of Kentucky
- Church: Episcopal Church
- Diocese: Kentucky
- Elected: October 2, 1953
- In office: 1954–1974
- Predecessor: Charles Clingman
- Successor: David Reed

Orders
- Ordination: June 1934 by Clinton S. Quin
- Consecration: February 2, 1954 by Henry Knox Sherrill

Personal details
- Born: August 19, 1905 Houston, Texas, United States
- Died: December 7, 2000 (aged 95) Louisville, Kentucky, United States
- Denomination: Anglican
- Spouse: Doris Anita Dissen
- Children: 3
- Education: University of Texas

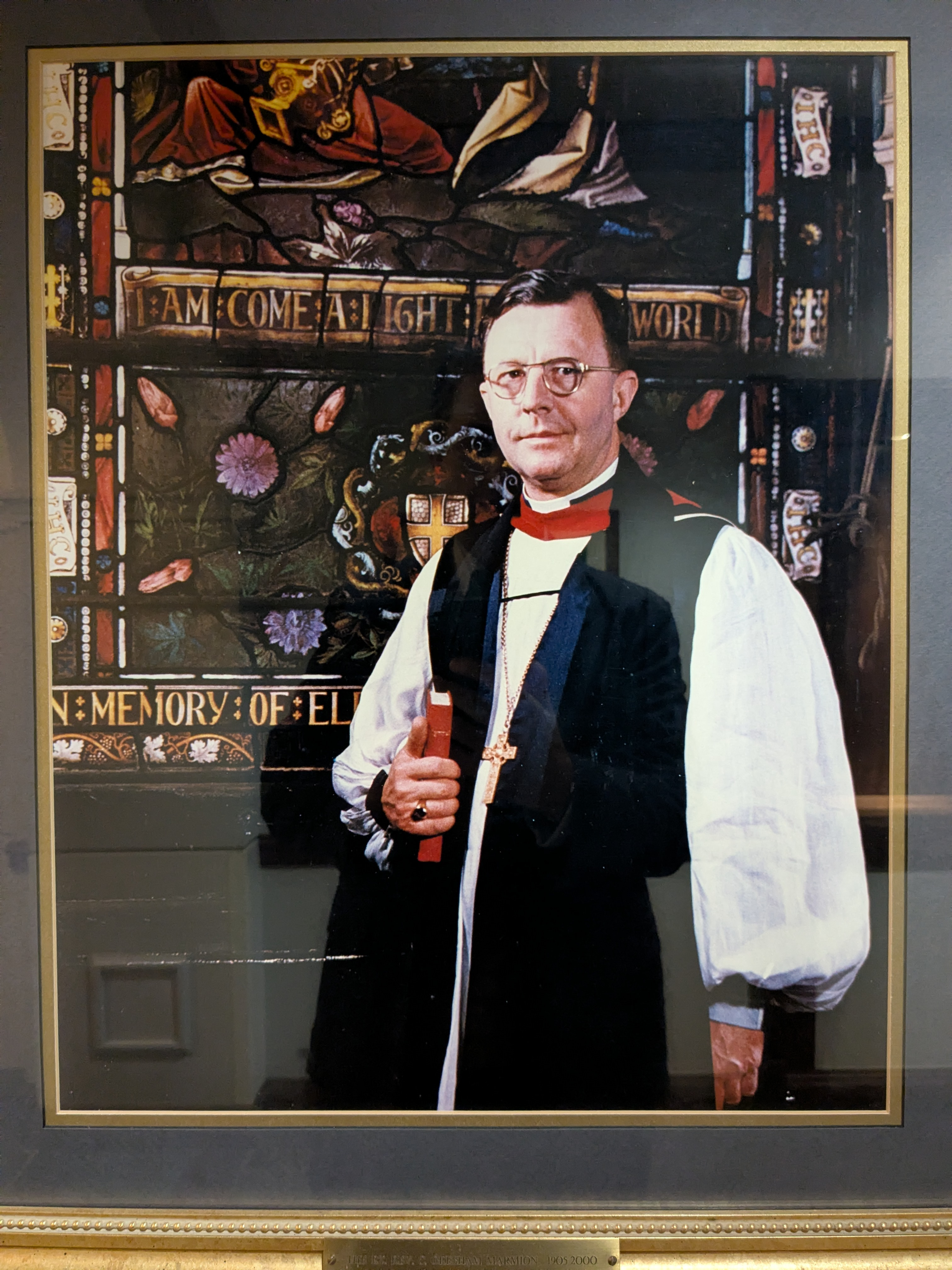
Portrait of C. Gresham Marmion at Church of the Incarnation, Dallas.

Charles Gresham Marmion Jr. (August 19, 1905 - December 7, 2000) was fifth bishop of the Episcopal Diocese of Kentucky, serving from 1954 to 1974.

== Early life and education ==
Marmion was born on August 19, 1905, in Houston, Texas. His younger brother, William H. Marmion, was also a prelate of the Episcopal Church who served as Bishop of Southwestern Virginia. He was educated at the public schools of Houston, Texas. He then studied at the University of Texas and graduated with a Bachelor of Arts in business in 1930. He then studied at the Virginia Theological Seminary and earned a Bachelor of Divinity in 1933. He married Doris Anita Dissen on July 1, 1937, and together had three children. He was awarded a Doctor of Divinity from Sewanee: The University of the South in 1954.

== Ordained ministry ==
Marmion was ordained deacon in July 1933 and priest in June 1934 by Bishop Clinton S. Quin of Texas. In 1933, he became rector of Christ Church in Eagle Lake, Texas and St John's Church in Columbus, Texas asst. He 1937, he transferred to St Alban's Church in Washington, D.C., to serve as its rector. Between 1940 and 1945, he served as rector of St George's Church in Port Arthur, Texas, and then, between 1945 and 1954, as rector of the Church of the Incarnation in Dallas, Texas, whose Marmion Library is named for him.

== Bishop ==
On October 2, 1953, during a convention held in Christ Church Cathedral, Louisville, Kentucky, Marmion was elected on the second ballot as the fifth Bishop of Kentucky. He formally accepted the election on October 22. His younger brother was elected Bishop of Southwestern Virginia that November. Marmion was consecrated Bishop of Kentucky on February 2, 1954, by Presiding Bishop Henry Knox Sherrill. During his episcopacy, parishes in the diocese were encouraged to be fiscally responsible. He also oversaw the establishment of a fund to assist with construction projects, including All Saints' Episcopal Center. He was also a promoter of ecumenism as encouraged after the Second Vatican Council. Marmion retired in 1974.

Episcopal Church (USA) titles
Preceded by Charles Clingman	5th Bishop of Kentucky; 1954–1974	Succeeded by David Benson Reed
