= Mark Bourlakas =

American bishop

The Right Reverend Mark Allen Bourlakas
- Sixth Bishop of Southwestern Virginia
- Church: Episcopal Church
- Diocese: Southwestern Virginia
- Elected: March 9, 2013
- In office: 2013–2025
- Predecessor: Frank Neff Powell
- Successor: Karin MacPhail

Orders
- Ordination: May 24, 1997 (deacon); December 6, 1997 (priest)
- Consecration: July 20, 2013 by Katharine Jefferts Schori

Personal details
- Denomination: Anglican
- Spouse: Martha Bourlakas
- Children: 3

Mark Allen Bourlakas was the sixth bishop of the Episcopal Diocese of Southwestern Virginia.

== Biography ==
After studies at Sewanee: The University of the South and Seabury-Western Theological Seminary, he was ordained to the diaconate on May 24, 1997, and to the priesthood on December 6, 1997. He served parishes in North Carolina, South Carolina, and Tennessee. On November 20, 2006, the cathedral chapter elected him Dean of Christ Church Cathedral in Louisville, Kentucky. he was installed in 2007. Bourlakas was elected Bishop of Southwestern Virginia on March 9, 2013, and was consecrated on July 20, 2013, at the Roanoke Performing Arts Theatre. In 2025, he resigned and assumed duties as an assistant bishop in the Diocese of Virginia on June 1, 2025, based in Falls Church, Virginia.

== See also ==
- Historical list of the Episcopal bishops of the United States
