= Frank Neff Powell =

American bishop

The Right Reverend Frank Neff Powell D.D.
- Bishop of Southwestern Virginia
- Church: Episcopal Church
- Diocese: Southwestern Virginia
- Elected: June 22, 1996
- In office: 1996–2013
- Predecessor: Arthur Heath Light
- Successor: Mark Bourlakas

Orders
- Ordination: 1974
- Consecration: October 26, 1996 by Edmond L. Browning

Personal details
- Born: December 28, 1947 (age 78) Salem, Oregon, United States
- Denomination: Anglican
- Spouse: Dorothy Ruth Houck (m. 1970)
- Children: 3

Frank Neff Powell (born December 28, 1947) was the fifth bishop of the Episcopal Diocese of Southwestern Virginia from 1996 till 2013.

== Early life and education ==
Powell was born on December 28, 1947, in Salem, Oregon. He was baptized at Saint Paul's Church in Salem, Oregon on November 28, 1948. Powell studied at Claremont Men's College from where he graduated with a Bachelor of Arts in history in 1970. After this, he commenced studies at the Episcopal Divinity School in Cambridge, Massachusetts, and graduated in 1973. He married Dorothy Ruth Houck in 1970.

== Ordained ministry ==
Powell was ordained deacon in 1973 and priest in 1974. He served as curate at Trinity Church in Portland, Oregon from 1973 till 1975, and later vicar of St Bede's Church in Forest Grove, Oregon from 1975 until 1983. In 1983 he became archdeacon of North Carolina and director for program in the Diocese of North Carolina. In 1990 he was then appointed as executive assistant to the Bishop of Oregon.

== Episcopacy ==
On June 22, 1996, Powell was elected the fifth Bishop of Southwestern Virginia on the fifth ballot. He was consecrated on October 26, 1996, with Presiding Bishop Edmond L. Browning as principal consecrator. He retired in July 2013 after nearly seventeen years of ministry leading the Diocese.
