= Terry A. White =

American prelate (born 1959)

The Right Reverend Terry Allen White
- Bishop of Kentucky
- Church: Episcopal Church
- Diocese: Kentucky
- Elected: June 5, 2010
- In office: 2010–present
- Predecessor: Edwin F. Gulick

Orders
- Ordination: 1986
- Consecration: September 25, 2010 by Katharine Jefferts Schori

Personal details
- Born: 1959 (age 66–67) Mount Pleasant, Iowa, United States
- Denomination: Anglican
- Spouse: Linda Sue White
- Children: 2
- Education: Iowa Wesleyan College

Ordination history of Terry A. White
History
Episcopal consecration
- Consecrated by: Katharine Jefferts Schori

Terry Allen White (born 1959) is an American prelate who is the eighth and current Bishop of Kentucky.

== Early life and education ==
White was born in 1959, in Mount Pleasant, Iowa. He studied at the Iowa Wesleyan College and graduated with a Bachelor of Arts in religion and philosophy in 1982. He then earned a Master of Divinity from Seabury-Western Theological Seminary in 1985. He was awarded a Doctor of Divinity from Seabury in 2011.

== Ordained ministry ==
White was ordained a deacon in 1985 and priest in 1986. Between 1985 and 1987, he served as curate at Christ Church in Winnetka, Illinois, before becoming rector of St Boniface's Church in Chilton, Wisconsin in 1987. In 1991, he became vicar of St Paul's Church in Plymouth, Illinois and in 1995 became rector of Trinity Church, Highland Park, Illinois. In 2004, he was appointed as Dean of Grace and Holy Trinity Cathedral in Kansas City, Missouri.

== Bishop ==
On June 5, 2010, White was elected on the second ballot as Bishop of Kentucky during a special electing convention held at Christ Church Cathedral in Louisville, Kentucky. His election was confirmed with the required consents from the House of Bishops on September 16, 2010, and was consecrated on September 25, 2010, in the Galt House, with Presiding Bishop Katharine Jefferts Schori as primary consecrator.

== See also ==
- List of Episcopal bishops of the United States
- Historical list of the Episcopal bishops of the United States

Episcopal Church (USA) titles
Preceded by Ted Gulick	8th Bishop of Kentucky; 2010–present	Incumbent
