= D. Bruce MacPherson =

Canadian bishop

The Right Reverend D. Bruce MacPherson
- Bishop of Western Louisiana
- Church: Episcopal Church
- Diocese: Western Louisiana
- Elected: April 20, 2002
- In office: 2002–2012
- Predecessor: Robert Jefferson Hargrove Jr.
- Successor: Jacob Wayne Owensby
- Previous post: Suffragan Bishop of Dallas (1999-2002)

Orders
- Ordination: September 1980 by Robert C. Rusack
- Consecration: October 9, 1999 by William E. Smalley

Personal details
- Born: July 24, 1940 Winnipeg, Manitoba, Canada
- Died: December 21, 2017 (aged 77) Edmond, Oklahoma, U.S.
- Denomination: Anglican
- Spouse: Susan D. Hegele
- Children: 2

David Bruce MacPherson (July 24, 1940 – December 21, 2017) was the third bishop of the Diocese of Western Louisiana in The Episcopal Church.

== Biography ==
MacPherson was born in Winnipeg, Manitoba, on July 24, 1940. He moved to the United States with his family when he was a teenager. He studied at Cypress College and was a manager in the books division of the Times Mirror Company. He then pursued theological studies at Bloy House, The Episcopal Theological School at Los Angeles and was ordained deacon February 1980 and priest in September of the same year by Bishop Robert C. Rusack of Los Angeles.

He served as a chaplain at the Episcopal Hospital of the Good Samaritan in Los Angeles between 1978 and 1980, and then became vicar-in-charge of St John's Church in La Verne, California. Between 1986 and 1988 he was rector of St Raphael's Church in Chino Valley, California In 1988 he also became canon to the ordinary in the Episcopal Diocese of Los Angeles, while in 1993, he became canon to the ordinary in the Episcopal Diocese of Dallas, where he remained until 1999. He was then elected Suffragan Bishop of Dallas on June 5, 1999 on the second ballot. He consecrated bishop on October 9, 1999 by Bishop William E. Smalley of Kansas. On April 20, 2002, he was elected Coadjutor Bishop of Western Louisiana and was installed as such on September 14, 2002, in St Mark's Cathedral. He shortly after succeeded as diocesan bishop and remained in office until his retirement in July 2012.

== Views ==
He was a member of Communion Partners, an organization of Episcopal Church bishops, dioceses, clergy, parishes and lay people which seeks to "maintain and strengthen" ties to the Anglican communion and "fidelity to the canons, integrities and realities of the Episcopal Church." In 2007, he expressed hope that the Anglican primates' ultimatum would help preserve unity in the Anglican communion. In 2015 at the 78th General Convention, Bishop MacPherson was among those who opposed changing the canons and liturgies of the Episcopal Church to allow any two people to marry. This canon replaced the traditional understanding of marriage: a covenant between a man and a woman. That marriage is reserved for a man and a woman is the understanding of the 1979 Book of Common Prayer.
