= Robert Hargrove =

Robert Hargrove may refer to:

- Robert Kennon Hargrove (1829–1905), American bishop of the Methodist Episcopal Church, South
- Robert Jefferson Hargrove Jr. (1934–2005), bishop of the Episcopal Diocese of Western Louisiana
