= George H. Quarterman =

Bishop of the Episcopal Diocese of Northwest Texas

The Right Reverend George Henry Quarterman
- Bishop of Northwest Texas
- Church: Episcopal Church
- Diocese: Northwest Texas
- Elected: September 17, 1946
- In office: 1946–1972
- Predecessor: Eugene Cecil Seaman
- Successor: Willis R. Henton

Orders
- Ordination: December 18, 1931 by Thomas Casady
- Consecration: December 3, 1946 by Henry St. George Tucker

Personal details
- Born: August 12, 1906 Poughkeepsie, New York, United States
- Died: September 7, 2002 (aged 96) Amarillo, Texas, United States
- Buried: Llano Cemetery, Amarillo, Texas
- Denomination: Anglican
- Parents: Frederick George Quarterman & Elizabeth Jane Brown
- Spouse: Ruth Grace Spahr (m. 1931)
- Children: 3

George Henry Quarterman (August 12, 1906 – September 7, 2002) was bishop of the Episcopal Diocese of Northwest Texas from 1946 to 1972.

== Early life and education ==
Quarterman was born on August 12, 1906, in Poughkeepsie, New York, to Frederick George Quarterman (1875-1948) and Elizabeth Jane Brown. (1872-1950) He studied at St Stephen's College, graduating with a Bachelor of Arts in 1928, and then at the General Theological Seminary from where he earned his Bachelor of Sacred Theology in 1931. He was awarded an honorary Doctor of Divinity from the University of the South in 1947 and a Doctor of Sacred Theology from Church Divinity School of the Pacific in 1959. He married Ruth Grace Spahr (1906-1986) on August 21, 1931, and together they had three children.

== Ordained ministry ==
Quarterman was ordained a deacon of the Episcopal Church on May 31, 1931, by Bishop William T. Manning of New York and priest on December 18, 1931, by Bishop Thomas Casady of Oklahoma. He served as rector of St Philip's Church in Ardmore, Oklahoma, between 1931 and 1946 and then briefly as rector of St Andrew's Church in Amarillo, Texas, in 1946. He served as deputy to the General Convention of 1937 and 1943.

== Bishop ==
On September 17, 1946, Quarterman was elected by the House of Bishops to become the third Missionary Bishop of the District of North Texas. He was consecrated on December 3, 1946, with Presiding Bishop Henry St. George Tucker as chief consecrator in St Andrew's Church, Amarillo, Texas. He was instrumental in establishing the Diocese of Northwest Texas, which came to be on October 31, 1958, and he became its first diocesan bishop. He retired in 1972. By the time of his death on September 7, 2002, he was the oldest living Episcopal bishop.
