= St. Mark's Episcopal Church (Shreveport, Louisiana) =

Historic church in Louisiana, United States

- The Church of the Holy Cross (Episcopal)
- U.S. National Register of Historic Places
- U.S. Historic district – Contributing property
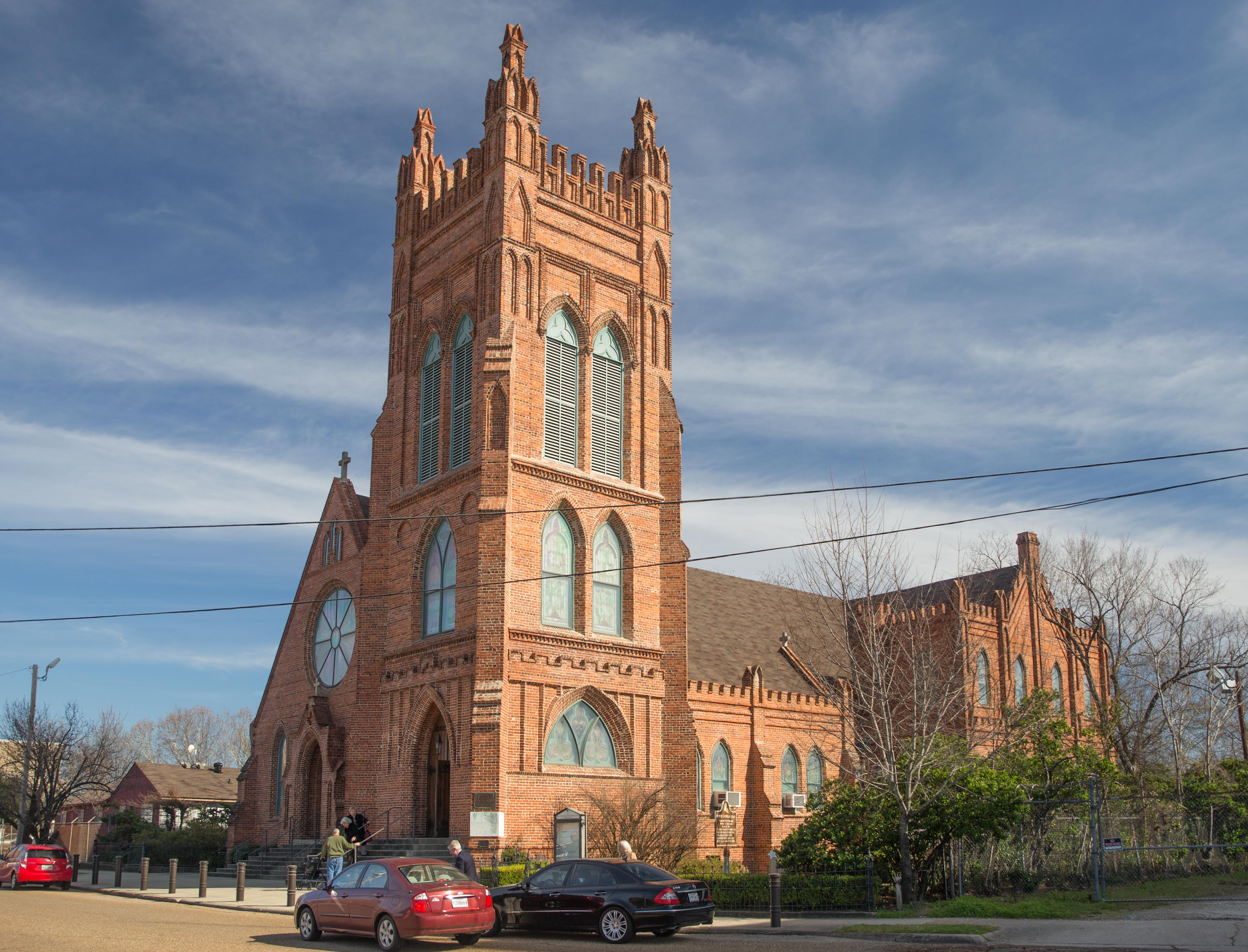
- The Church of the Holy Cross as seen in winter

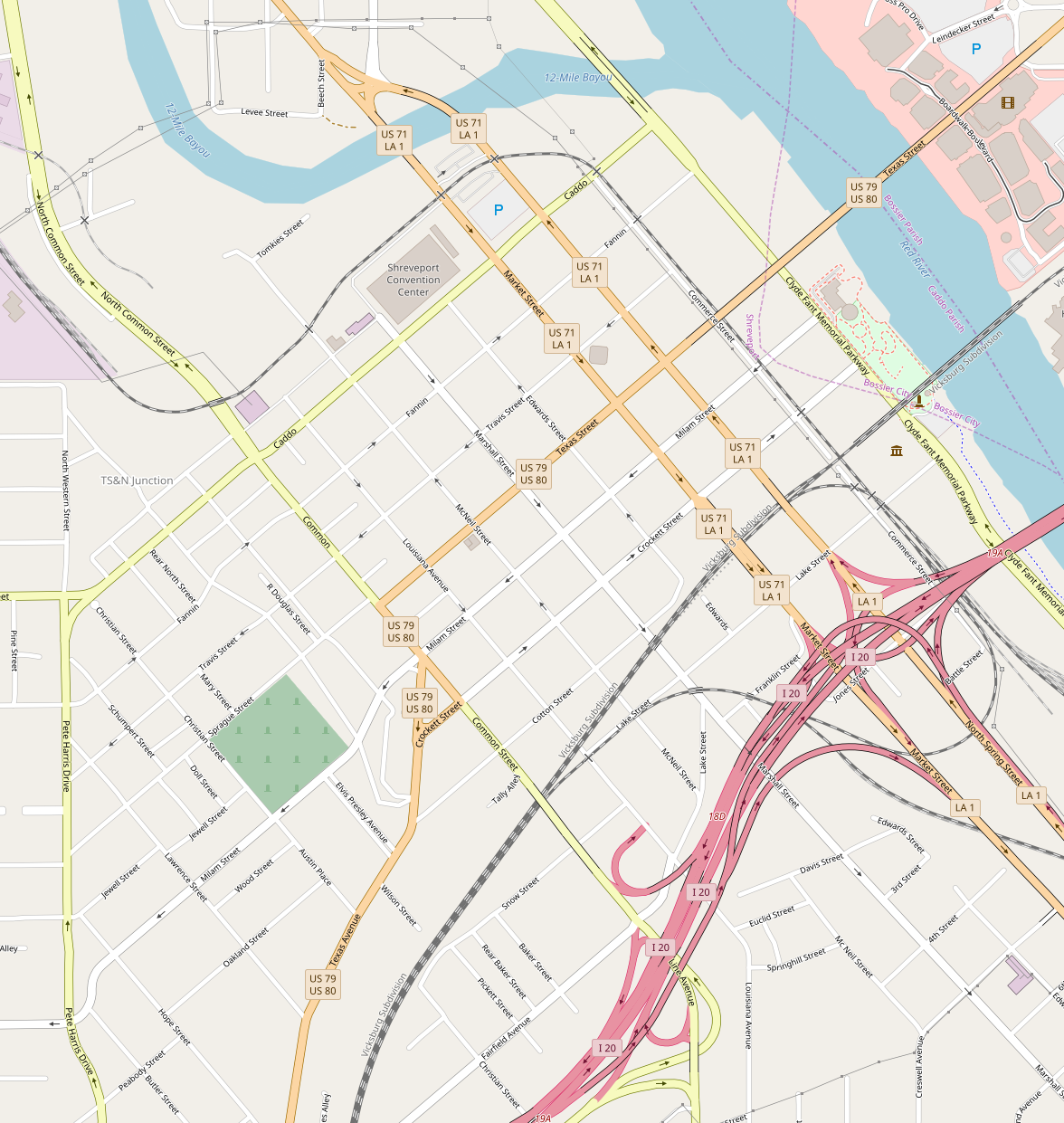
- Location within Shreveport Downtown Location within Louisiana Location within the United States
- Location: 875 Cotton Street; Shreveport, Louisiana
- Coordinates: 32°30′25″N 93°45′05″W
- Area: less than one acre
- Built: 1905
- Architect: C.W. Bulger
- Architectural style: Late Gothic Revival
- Part of: Shreveport Commercial Historic District (ID82002760)
- NRHP reference No.: 91000700

Significant dates
- Added to NRHP: June 11, 1991
- Designated CP: May 16, 1997

The Church of the Holy Cross (Episcopal), which housed St. Mark's until 1954, is a historic church at 875 Cotton Street in Shreveport, Louisiana, United States. The first services of the Episcopal church in Shreveport were celebrated by the Rt. Rev. Leonidas Polk, the Bishop of Louisiana in March 1839. That liturgy is considered the founding day of St. Mark's Church. Prior to this church building, the church was located on Fannin Street. St. Mark's moved into a new church building at Fairfield Avenue and Rutherford Street in 1954. That church became the cathedral of the Diocese of Western Louisiana on July 7, 1990.

Holy Cross was formed because a group of Episcopalians from St. Mark's felt that the Church should maintain a presence in the inner city. It owns and operates a number of ministries around Shreveport, but most notably it runs Holy Cross Hope House. Hope House is a day shelter down the street for homeless people.

Holy Cross is also known for its progressive attitude toward social issues. It is one of the few churches in North Louisiana that will marry gay couples. It is also known for its traditional worship style. It had an E.M. Skinner organ built in 1920, another large Aeolian-Skinner organ was ordered in 1956.

The current rector is the Reverend Garrett Boyte, M.Div. The cathedral reported 1,750 members in 2016 and 1,797 members in 2023; no membership statistics were reported in 2024 parochial reports. Plate and pledge income reported for the congregation in 2024 was $1,869,911. Average Sunday attendance (ASA) in 2024 was 311 persons.

Holy Cross has been served by the Reverend Mary Richard (2008-2019), and the Reverend Kenneth W. Paul (1968-2008).

The church was added to the National Register of Historic Places in 1991. It also became a contributing property of Shreveport Commercial Historic District when its boundaries were increased on May 16, 1997.

== See also ==
- National Register of Historic Places listings in Caddo Parish, Louisiana
