= Robert Jefferson Hargrove Jr. =

American bishop

The Right Reverend Robert Jefferson Hargrove Jr.
- Bishop of Western Louisiana
- Church: Episcopal Church
- Diocese: Northwest Texas
- Elected: March 13, 1989
- In office: 1990-2001
- Predecessor: Willis R. Henton
- Successor: D. Bruce MacPherson

Orders
- Ordination: December 1967 by Gordon V. Smith
- Consecration: July 8, 1989 by Edmond L. Browning

Personal details
- Born: October 3, 1937 Paducah, Kentucky, United States
- Died: May 19, 2005 (aged 67) Pineville, Louisiana, United States
- Denomination: Anglican
- Parents: Robert Jefferson Hargrove & Mildred Alice Copley
- Spouse: Linda Hargrove (m. 1957)
- Children: 3

Robert Jefferson Hargrove, Junior (October 3, 1937 – May 19, 2005) was the second bishop of the Episcopal Diocese of Western Louisiana.

== Early life and education ==
Hargrove was born on October 3, 1937, in Paducah, Kentucky, to Robert Jefferson Hargrove Senior and Mildred Alice Copley, and was raised as a Baptist. He was educated at Paducah Tilghman High School and later studied at Georgetown College from where he earned a Bachelor in Music Education. He married Linda Hargrove on December 29, 1957, and together had three children. Later he earned a Master of Divinity from the Central Baptist Theological Seminary in Kansas in 1965 and subsequently ministered at the DeSoto Baptist Church in DeSoto in De Soto, Kansas. During that time he joined the Episcopal Church and commenced studies at the Seabury-Western Theological Seminary from where he graduated in 1967.

== Ordained ministry ==
Hargrove was ordained to the diaconate in June 1967 and to the priesthood in December 1967 in Trinity Cathedral, Davenport, Iowa. He was then appointed assistant to the dean of Trinity Cathedral. After a while he moved to West Palm Beach, Florida, to serve as associate rector of Holy Trinity Church. Later he also became rector of St Andrew's Church in Grand Prairie, Texas, and Canon to the Ordinary. He was also rector of Grace Church in Madison, Wisconsin, and in 1980 became rector of Grace Church in Monroe, Louisiana. Between 1987 and 1989 he served as rector of the Church Ascension in Lafayette, Louisiana.

== Bishop ==
During a special convention of the Diocese of Western Louisiana held on March 13, 1989, Hargrove was elected its Coadjutor Bishop. He was consecrated as a bishop on July 8, 1989, with Presiding Bishop Edmond L. Browning as chief consecrator. He succeeded as diocesan bishop on July 7, 1990, and duly installed at St Mark's Cathedral in Shreveport, Louisiana. Hargrove retired on November 1, 2001. After a lengthily illness, he died on May 19, 2005, at his home in Pineville, Louisiana.

== Sources ==
- Episcopal Church Annual
