= Jacob W. Owensby =

The Right Reverend Jacob Wayne Owensby
- Bishop of Western Louisiana
- Church: Episcopal Church
- Diocese: Western Louisiana
- Elected: April 21, 2012
- In office: 2012-present
- Predecessor: D. Bruce MacPherson

Orders
- Ordination: June 8, 1997 (deacon); December 7, 1997 (priest)
- Consecration: July 21, 2012 by Katharine Jefferts Schori

Personal details
- Born: October 1957 (age 68–69)
- Denomination: Anglican
- Spouse: Joy Bruce Owensby (m. 1983)
- Children: 3
- Education: University of the South

Jacob Wayne Owensby (born October 1957) is the fourth and current bishop of the Episcopal Diocese of Western Louisiana. He is also chancellor of the University of the South.

== Biography ==
Owensby undertook studies at Emory University from where he graduated with bachelor’s, master’s and doctoral degrees in philosophy. After studies at Sewanee: The University of the South, he was ordained to the diaconate on June 8, 1997 and to the priesthood on December 7, 1997. He was assistant rector of St Mark’s Church in Jacksonville, Florida between 1997 and 1999, then rector of St Stephen’s Church in Huntsville, Alabama, and later rector of Emmanuel Church in Webster Groves, Missouri. In 2009 he was appointed Dean of St Mark's Cathedral in Shreveport, Louisiana.

On April 21, 2012, he was elected on the sixth ballot as Bishop of Western Louisiana during a special convention held at St James’ Church in Alexandria, Louisiana. He was consecrated on July 21, 2012 in St Mark's Cathedral with Presiding Bishop Katharine Jefferts Schori as chief consecrator.

In January 2023, Owensby was selected as the 26th chancellor of the University of the South, the Episcopal college in Sewanee, Tennessee. As at British universities, the chancellor is a ceremonial position but does not run the university day to day, a job left to the vice-chancellor.

== See also ==
- List of Episcopal bishops of the United States
- Historical list of the Episcopal bishops of the United States
