= Scott Mayer (bishop) =

American bishop (born 1955)

The Right Reverend Scott Mayer
- Bishop of Northwest Texas
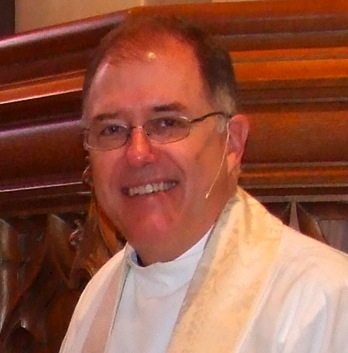
- Church: Episcopal Church
- Diocese: Northwest Texas
- Elected: November 22, 2008
- In office: 2009-present
- Predecessor: Charles Wallis Ohl
- Other post: Provisional Bishop of North Texas (2015-2022)

Orders
- Ordination: March 25, 1993 by James M. Stanton
- Consecration: March 22, 2009 by Katharine Jefferts Schori

Personal details
- Born: September 23, 1955 (age 70) Dallas, Texas, United States
- Denomination: Anglican
- Spouse: Katherine Kistenmacher
- Children: 2

James Scott Mayer (born September 23, 1955) is the fifth and current Bishop of the Episcopal Diocese of Northwest Texas in The Episcopal Church. He was elected after two ballots in an electing convention at St. Paul's on the Plains Church in Lubbock, Texas on November 22, 2008, and was consecrated as Bishop of Northwest Texas on March 21, 2009. Prior to his election as Bishop of Northwest Texas, Mayer served as Rector of the Church of the Heavenly Rest in Abilene, Texas.

== Biography ==
James Scott Mayer was born in 1955 in Dallas, Texas. His family moved to Lubbock soon after his birth. He and his two younger brothers grew up in Lubbock and, subsequently, Fort Worth, where Mayer graduated from Southwest High School in 1973. He received his BBA Degree in Management from Texas Tech University in 1977. Mayer then went to Houston, where he worked in sales for the Wayne Bull Company, and married Katherine in 1978. The next year they moved to the Dallas area where Scott was associated with the Ralph E. Russell Company as a manufacturers' representative.

An Episcopalian since birth, Mayer reports that he sensed a call to ordained ministry for some time, but wrestled with it for several years. In his words, he finally "gave up" and entered the Episcopal Theological Seminary of the Southwest in 1989. There he was interested in Theology and Ethics. His own theology was shaped by Anglican theologians F.D. Maurice, former Archbishop of Canterbury William Temple, and John Macquarrie. He graduated with a Master of Divinity degree in 1992.

In June 1992 he was ordained a deacon by the Rt. Rev. Donis Patterson, V Bishop of Dallas. In March 1993 he was ordained a priest by the Rt. Rev. James Stanton, VI Bishop of Dallas. He first served as a curate at St. James Episcopal Church in Texarkana, Texas. He was then called to the Church of the Heavenly Rest as an associate rector in 1994. In November 1995 he was called to be rector of that same parish. He remained as rector of that parish until he was elected from a field of four nominees in November 2008 as Bishop of Northwest Texas. Mayer was the only candidate for bishop from within the Diocese, the rest serving elsewhere in The Episcopal Church.

Mayer is married to Katherine Mayer and they have two children: Diane and Daniel.

== See also ==
- List of Episcopal bishops of the United States
- Historical list of the Episcopal bishops of the United States

Episcopal Church (USA) titles
Preceded by C. Wallis Ohl	5th Bishop of Northwest Texas; 21 March 2009 – present	Succeeded by incumbent
