= William H. Marmion =

American bishop

The Right Reverend William Henry Marmion D.D.
- Bishop of Southwestern Virginia
- Marmion in the 1930s
- Church: Episcopal Church
- Diocese: Southwestern Virginia
- Elected: November 18, 1953
- In office: 1954–1979
- Predecessor: Henry D. Phillips
- Successor: Arthur Heath Light

Orders
- Ordination: April 5, 1933 by Clinton S. Quin
- Consecration: May 13, 1954 by Henry Knox Sherrill

Personal details
- Born: October 8, 1907 Houston, Texas, United States
- Died: May 30, 2002 (aged 94) Roanoke, Virginia, United States
- Denomination: Anglican
- Parents: Charles Gresham Marmion & Katherine Angie Rankin
- Spouse: Mabel Dougherty Nall (m. December 28, 1935)
- Children: 2

William Henry Marmion (October 8, 1907 - May 30, 2002) was bishop of the Episcopal Diocese of Southwestern Virginia from 1954 to 1979.

== Early life and education ==
Marmion was born on October 8, 1907, in Houston, Texas, the son of Charles Gresham Marmion and Katherine Angie Rankin. His older brother, Charles G. Marmion, was also a prelate of the Episcopal Church who served as Bishop of Kentucky. He studied at the Rice Institute and graduated with a Bachelor of Arts in 1929. he then furthered his education at the Virginia Theological Seminary, from where he gained his Bachelor of Divinity in 1932. He was awarded a Doctor of Divinity from the Virginia Seminary. He married Mabel Dougherty Nall on December 28, 1935, and together had two sons.

== Ordained ministry ==
Marmion was ordained deacon on July 20, 1932, and to the priesthood on April 5, 1933, by the Bishop of Texas Clinton S. Quin. He then served as minister-in-charge of St James' Church in Taylor, Texas and Grace Church in Georgetown, Texas from 1932 to 1935. In 1935 he became associate minister of St Mark's Church in San Antonio, Texas, while in 1938 he transferred to Birmingham, Alabama to become rector of St Mary's-on-the-Highlands. In 1950 he became rector of St Andrew's Church in Wilmington, Delaware, where he remained until 1954.

== The Bishop William H. Marmion Papers ==
The Marmion Papers are isolated into four segments. The first of the series, Personal Papers, is contained an assortment of materials about the individual existence of Marmion. Remembered for this arrangement are photos of the Bishop, historical data, and news sections. Of note are various envelopes on social issues and occasions; models incorporate religion-related exhibitions, for example, Jesus Christ Superstar and Joseph and the Technicolor Dreamcoat. This arrangement likewise remembers pamphlets and maps for the sundry areas Marmion visited because of his movement to church-related occasions.

The subsequent arrangement subtitled Marmion's Early Career from 1932 until 1950. During this time Marmion filled in as a minister and minister in a few temples in Alabama and Texas: as Priest in Charge at St. James Church in Taylor and Grace Church in Georgetown from 1932 to 1935, as Associate Minister of St. Imprint's Church in San Antonio from 1935 to 1938, and as Rector of St. Mary's on the Highlands from 1938 to 1950. Most of the material right now on issues identified with the Marmion's work with the congregation, incorporating his work with youth. A littler third arrangement covers the Bishop's residency as Rector of St. Andrew's, Wilmington, Delaware, from 1950 through May 1954, and a considerable lot of the archives right now with the undertakings of St. Andrew's Church.

The greater part of the Marmion Papers dwells in arrangement four, Bishop of Southwestern Virginia, 1954–1979. The arrangement is partitioned into four sub-arrangement: managerial, social liberties, universal issues, and the Vietnam War. The primary sub-arrangement, Administrative documents, contains general authoritative records identifying with the Diocese of Southwestern Virginia and Marmion's obligations in the Episcopal Church. Data incorporates a wide scope of subjects, including the board of trustees reports, diocesan reports, ventures and projects embraced by both the congregation and ward, and correspondence identified with the everyday activities of the see.

The substance of the second sub-arrangement, Civil Rights, incorporate handouts, correspondence, magazine articles, and paper articles which Marmion either gathered or created on the social equality development, for the most part from the 1950s and 1960s. Remembered for this arrangement are archives identifying with the debate over the biracial meetings at Hemlock Haven, a retreat close to Marion, Virginia obtained by the bishopric in 1957. While Marmion kept up the view that the adolescent gatherings ought to be available to individuals from the two races, many lay individuals from the see restricted blended race meetings for youngsters, and simply following five years of discussion did the office open to camps went to mutually by whites and African-Americans. The Bishop's yearly documents on race relations from 1954 to 1965 additionally offer a firsthand understanding of the social equality development in the United States.

The third sub-arrangement, International Affairs, incorporates correspondence and related reports specifying the Bishop's exercises in abroad issues. Countless the organizers detail partner bishopric associations with holy places in Great Britain and Ecuador, and under the umbrella of this contact, Marmion made visits to the two nations. Likewise remembered for this sub-arrangement are reports that layout Marmion's restriction to politically sanctioned racial segregation in South Africa. Accepting monetary authorizations was vital to compelling the South African government to end the racial segregation of the politically sanctioned racial segregation framework, in 1969 the Bishop led an advisory group to keep the Episcopal Church from utilizing banks which upheld that nation's administration. Marmion's contention was enticing, and the congregation made a deal to avoid using banking firms who financed South Africa.

The fourth and littlest sub-arrangement, Vietnam War, incorporates handouts, correspondence, magazine articles, and news cut-outs on the war in Vietnam somewhere in the range of 1964 and 1975. The Bishop supported closure the contention in Southeast Asia, and his cooperation in an open enemy of war showing in Roanoke got under the skin of a portion of his parishioners. Called both socialist and un-energetic, Marmion by the by tried to impact the United States government to look for a conclusion to military inclusion in Vietnam.

== Bishop ==
On November 18, 1953, Marmion was elected Bishop of Southwestern Virginia on the fifth ballot. He was consecrated on May 13, 1954, with Presiding Bishop Henry Knox Sherrill as chief consecrator, three months after his brother's consecration. Marmion was vocal in his support for the civil rights movement and integration, despite the opposition encountered in the diocese. He also supported the ordination of women and the adoption of the new Book of Common Prayer of 1979. He retained the post till his retirement in 1979. After retirement he served as minister of St Peter's By-The-Sea in Cape Neddick, Maine.
