= Episcopal Diocese of Colombia =

Diocese of the Episcopal Church in Colombia

Diocese of Episcopal Diocese of Colombia Una, Sancta, Catholica et Apostolica Sigillum Ecclesiae Colombianensis Spanish: Iglesia episcopal en Colombia
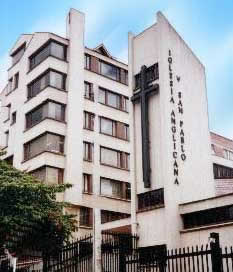
- Cathedral of Saint Paul (Bogotá)

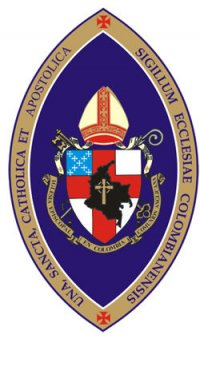
- Coat of arms

Location
- Country: Colombia
- Territory: Bogotá
- Ecclesiastical province: Province IX

Statistics
- Congregations: 35
- Members: 2,776 (2020)

Information
- Denomination: Anglican
- Rite: Anglican
- Established: 1963
- Cathedral: Cathedral of Saint Paul, Bogotá

Current leadership
- Bishop: Elias Garcia Cardenas

Website
- www.episcopalchurch.org/find-a-church/colombia/

The Episcopal Church in Colombia is a church of the Anglican Communion. The diocese comprises 12 parishes, 15 missions and 8 preaching stations in Colombia. It is part of the Province IX of the Episcopal Church in the United States. Its headquarters are located in Bogotá.

== History ==
The Episcopal Church in Colombia began as a chaplainship at the service of English-speaking foreigners residing in the country. Therefore, pastoral jurisdiction passed successively from the Falkland Islands to Jamaica, to British Honduras and finally to Panama.

It was the missionary Waite Hockin Stirling, from the Falkland Islands, who, having been consecrated in 1869 in London, assumed the responsibility of overseeing Colombia pastorally. The Falkland Islands were the only territory on the American continent where an English bishop could legally settle. From such a remote residence, the bishop could hardly visit the missions or chaplaincies of Colombia, but he made use of resident priests in Panama.

The Rev. James Craik Morris, consecrated bishop on February 5, 1920, was in charge of the missionary district of Panama and the Panama Canal Zone. He made his first visit to Colombia in March 1921. The financial and labor crisis of the years 1927-1929 decimated the missionary presence, because people were forced to migrate to other places in search of work. Bishop Morris died in 1930 and the diocese of Panama was vacant until Bishop Harry Beal was elected and consecrated on January 13, 1937. Two years after his consecration, Beal made his first pastoral visit to Colombia, in 1939.

In 1944 Bishop Beal sent the Rev. George F. Packard to Colombia for a two-week visit. The report he gave so motivated the national council of the church that it approved the reopening of work in Colombia in February 1945. Everything was prepared for the aggressive missionary plan that would begin that same year.

In 1946, the Archbishop of Canterbury, Geoffrey Fisher, passed the pastoral care of the churches in Colombia and Ecuador to Bishop Henry Sherrill, presiding bishop of the Episcopal Church of the United States, who placed the two countries under the pastoral care of Bishop Reginald Heber Gooden (1946-1963). The work in Colombia grew through Gooden's strategy.

The most important church in the diocese is that of San Alban, inaugurated on Easter in 1958.

In the early 1960s it became apparent to Bishop Gooden that the ministry had to be extended nationally if further growth of the church was to be achieved. On April 13, 1961, the bishop celebrated the first mass in Spanish in Barranquilla. Ten days later, he officiated at a baptism in Spanish in Cali. The English-speaking missionaries who entered Colombia could do so under the condition that they minister only to foreigners.

In 1963 the Episcopal Diocese of Colombia was erected. Colombia split from the missionary district of Panama and the Canal Zone.

At that time the membership of the diocese was, in a very high percentage, foreign, speaking 99 percent in English.

The first diocesan convention of the Diocese of Colombia was presided over by Bishop David Reed in Barranquilla between May 18 and 20, 1964. In this convention, Bishop Reed outlined the objectives of his ministry: to create a strongly pastoral church, to make a Colombian church in Spanish, to be an ecumenical church, to participate in God's world mission, to trust in the laity for the exercise of a vanguard ministry in social work. The first Colombian priest, Oscar Pineda Suárez, is ordained in Guayaquil, Ecuador, by Bishop Reed, in 1964. The first Colombian deacon was Samuel Pinzón Gil.

The process of indigenization of the church was achieved gradually. In 1965, the diocese had five North American priests, one British and two Colombians. In 1969 there were six Colombian priests, four North Americans and one Spaniard. Foreign membership had dropped to 65 percent.

The Diocese's Trinity Foundation is funded in part by Episcopal Relief & Development.

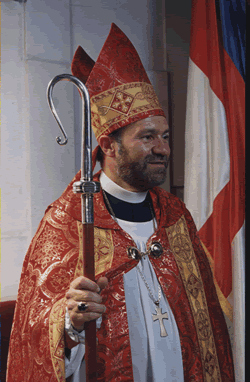
The Rt. Rev. Francisco Jose Duque-Gómez

In 2001, the first "cradle Episcopalian", native Colombian bishop, Francisco Jose Duque-Gómez, was consecrated.

== List of bishops ==
Bishops of Colombia
From	Until	Incumbent	Notes
1964	1972	David Reed	David Benson Reed (born February 16, 1927, Tulsa, OK); became coadjutor (later diocesan) in Kentucky.
1972	1978	William A. Franklin	William Alfred Franklin (born in the United Kingdom)
1979	2001	Bernardo Merino Botero	(born c. 1931)
2001	2023	Francisco Duque-Gómez	Francisco José Duque-Gómez (born 1950, Salamina, Caldas); previously coadjutor since 2001.
2023	Present	Elias Garcia Cardenas	

== Ecumenism ==
The Episcopal Church in Colombia participates in several ecumenical organizations:

- Colombian Confederation of Religious Freedom, Conscience and Worship (CONFELIREC): confederation that seeks equal conditions for all churches in Colombia. It is a consultative entity of the Colombian government in matters of freedom and religious equality.
- Ecumenical Network of Colombia: a space made up of some churches and Christian organizations with a presence in Colombia.
- Latin American Council of Churches (CLAI): an organization of churches and Christian movements that promotes unity among Christians on the continent.
