= Arthur Heath Light =

American prelate (born 1929)

The Right Reverend Arthur Heath Light D.D.
- Bishop of Southwestern Virginia
- Church: Episcopal Church
- Diocese: Southwestern Virginia
- In office: 1979–1996
- Predecessor: William H. Marmion
- Successor: Frank Neff Powell

Orders
- Ordination: June 24, 1955 by George P. Gunn
- Consecration: June 2, 1979 by John Allin

Personal details
- Born: July 7, 1929 (age 96) Lynchburg, Virginia, United States
- Denomination: Anglican
- Parents: Alexander Heath Light & Mary Watkins Nelson
- Spouse: Sarah Ann Jones (m. June 12, 1954)
- Children: 4

Arthur Heath Light (born July 7, 1929) is an American prelate who served as the fourth Episcopal Church Bishop of Southwestern Virginia between 1979 and 1996.

== Early life and education ==
Light was born on July 7, 1929, in Lynchburg, Virginia, son of Alexander Heath Light and Mary Watkins Nelson. He studied at Hampden–Sydney College from where he graduated with a Bachelor of Arts in 1951. He also enrolled at the Virginia Theological Seminary from where he earned his Master of Divinity in 1954. He married Sarah Ann Jones on June 12, 1954, and together had four children. In 1979 he was awarded am honorary Doctor of Divinity by the Virginia Theological Seminary.

== Ordained ministry ==
Light was ordained deacon on June 11, 1954, and priest on June 24, 1955, in Christ and St. Luke's Church by Bishop George P. Gunn of Southern Virginia. From 1954 to 1958, he served as priest-in-charge of St James Church and Christ Church in Boydton, Virginia, St John's Church in Chase City, Virginia and St Timothy's Church in Clarksville, Virginia. In 1958 he became rector of Christ Church in Elizabeth City, North Carolina, while in 1964 he became rector of St Mary's Church in Kinston, North Carolina. Between 1967 and 1979, he served as rector of Christ and St. Luke's Church in Norfolk, Virginia. He also served as deputy to the General Conventions of 1969, 1970, and 1973 from the Diocese of Virginia.

== Bishop ==
Light was elected Bishop of Southwestern Virginia in 1979 and was consecrated on June 2, 1979, in the Salem Civic Center in Salem, Virginia. He was consecrated by Presiding Bishop John Allin. Throughout his tenure, Light was a prominent supporter of the ordination of women and appointed numerous women to different positions in the diocese. He retired in 1996.
