= Diocese of Fort Worth =

Diocese of Fort Worth may refer to:

- Roman Catholic Diocese of Fort Worth
- Episcopal Diocese of Fort Worth, part of the Anglican Church in North America
- Episcopal Church in North Texas, a defunct diocese of the Episcopal Church now merged with the Diocese of Texas
