= Eugene Cecil Seaman =

American Episcopal bishop

The Right Reverend Eugene Cecil Seaman
- Missionary Bishop of Northwest Texas
- Church: Episcopal Church
- See: Northwest Texas
- Elected: 1924
- In office: 1924–1945
- Predecessor: Edward A. Temple
- Successor: George H. Quarterman

Orders
- Ordination: May 26, 1907 by George Herbert Kinsolving
- Consecration: January 18, 1925 by Thomas F. Gailor

Personal details
- Born: December 9, 1881 Galveston, Texas, United States
- Died: November 22, 1950 (aged 68) Phoenix, Arizona, United States
- Buried: Llano Cemetery, Amarillo, Texas
- Denomination: Anglican
- Parents: William Henry Seaman & Sophia Baldwin
- Spouse: Henrietta Morgan (m. 1912)
- Children: 3
- Education: University of the South

Eugene Cecil Seaman (December 9, 1881 – November 22, 1950) was an American prelate of the Episcopal Church who was missionary bishop of the Missionary District of Northwest Texas, serving from 1924 to 1945.

== Early life and education ==
Seaman was born on December 9, 1881, in Galveston, Texas, the son of William Henry Seaman and Sophia Baldwin. He was educated at Ball High School in Galveston, graduating in 1900. He also earned a Bachelor of Arts in 1903, a Bachelor of Divinity in 1906, and an honorary Doctor of Divinity in 1925 from the University of the South.

== Ordained ministry ==
Seaman was ordained deacon in June 1906 and priest on May 26, 1907, by Bishop George Herbert Kinsolving of Texas. He then became assistant minister at Christ Church in Houston, Texas, while in 1907, he became rector of Christ Church in Temple, Texas. Between 1911 and 1916 he served as Archdeacon and general missionary in North Texas, and then rector of St Andrew’s Church in Amarillo, Texas, between 1916 and 1920. In 1920 he transferred to Gadsden, Alabama, to serve as rector of the Church of the Holy Comforter, where he remained until 1925. He was also executive secretary of the Diocese of Alabama from 1923 until 1924.

== Bishop ==
In 1924, Seaman was elected on the first ballot to be the missionary bishop of the Missionary District of North Texas. He was subsequently consecrated bishop on January 18, 1925, by Bishop Thomas F. Gailor of Tennessee. In 1926 he was also elected as acting missionary bishop of Oklahoma. During that time he consecrated St Paul's Cathedral in Oklahoma City. He relinquished his responsibilities in Oklahoma to give way to the election of its first diocesan bishop in 1927. He remained in North Texas until his retirement in 1945. He died in Phoenix, Arizona, on November 22, 1950.

== Personal life ==
Seaman married Henrietta Morgan on April 11, 1912, and together had two sons, one of whom dies in infancy, and one daughter. His wife died on April 8, 1971.
