= Virginia Episcopal School =

Prep school in Lynchburg, Virginia, US

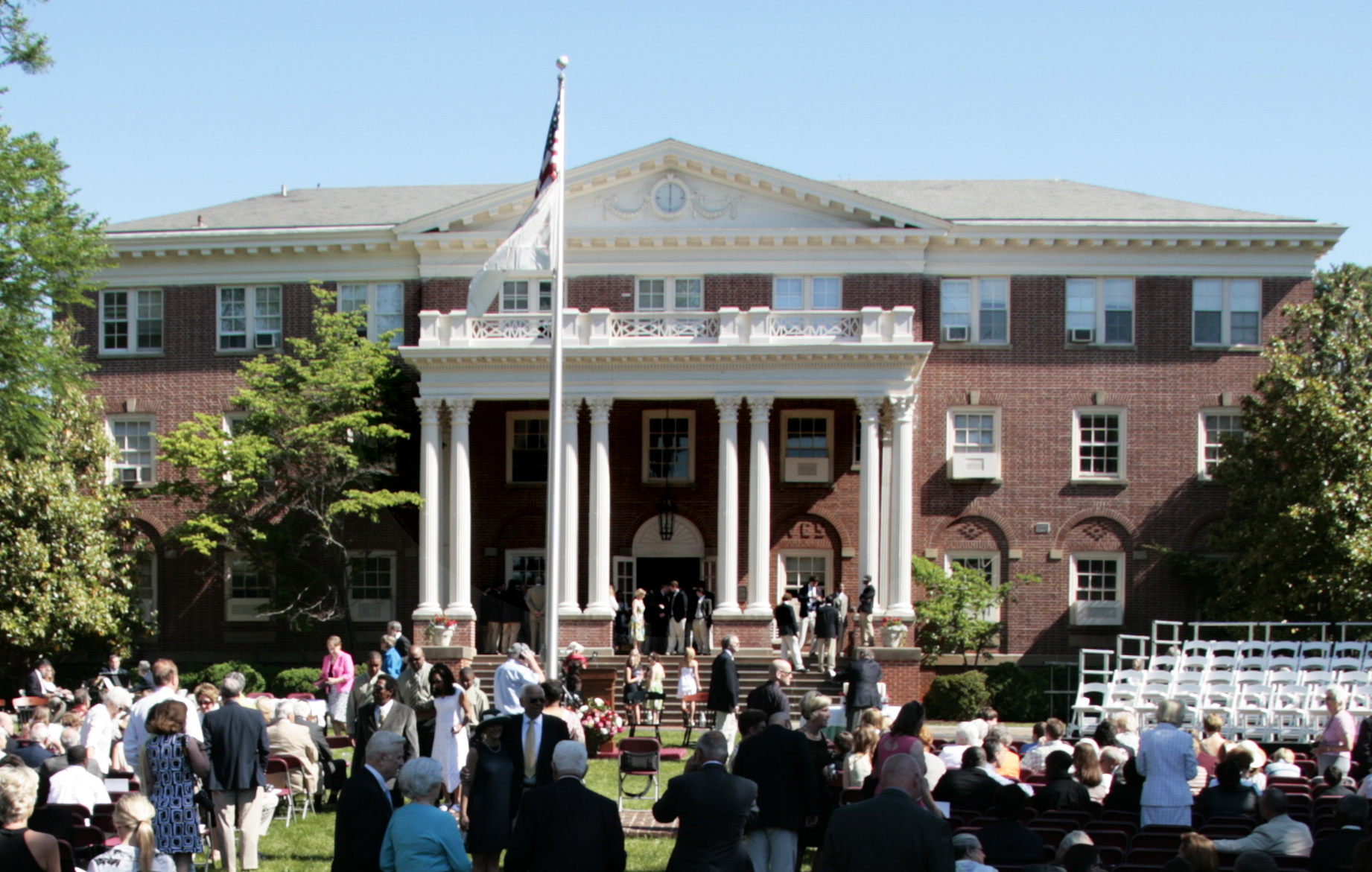
- Jett Hall, VES's main building

Location
- 400 VES Road; Lynchburg, Virginia 24503; United States; 37°27′9.5″N 79°11′26.5″W

Information
- Other name: VES
- Type: Private, college preparatory, boarding and day school
- Motto: "Toward Full Stature"
- Religious affiliation: Episcopalian
- Established: 1916; 110 years ago
- Founder: Reverend Robert Carter Jett
- Head of school: Garth Q. Ainslie
- Faculty: 40
- Grades: 9-12
- Gender: Co-educational
- Enrollment: 260
- Average class size: 11
- Student to teacher ratio: 6:1
- Campus size: 160 acres (0.65 km^{2})
- Campus type: Suburban
- Colors: Garnet and White
- Athletics conference: Virginia Independent Conference (Boys); Blue Ridge Conference (Girls)
- Team name: The Fighting Bishops
- Website: www.ves.org
- Virginia Episcopal School
- U.S. National Register of Historic Places
- Virginia Landmarks Register
- Location within Virginia Location within the United States
- Location: 400 Virginia Episcopal School Rd., Lynchburg, Virginia
- Area: 160 acres (65 ha)
- Built: 1916
- Architects: Brooke, Frederick H.
- Architectural style: Colonial Revival, Georgian Revival
- NRHP reference No.: 92001392
- VLR No.: 118-0224

Significant dates
- Added to NRHP: October 28, 1992
- Designated VLR: June 17, 1992

Virginia Episcopal School (VES) is a private, co-educational college preparatory, boarding and day school for students in grades 9 - 12, located in Lynchburg, Virginia, United States. The school was first conceived in 1906 by the Reverend Robert Carter Jett, and opened its doors to students in September 1916. Virginia Episcopal School's 160-acre (0.65 km^{2}) campus is located above the James River in Lynchburg along the foothills of the Blue Ridge Mountains.

== History ==
Virginia Episcopal School's early benefactor, Viscountess Astor, the first female member of British Parliament, donated much of the school's initial endowment while visiting her family home, Mirador, in Albemarle County. Lady Astor maintained a keen interest in the school for the rest of her life and was instrumental in having her father Chiswell Langhorne donate the school chapel in memory of his wife Nancy Witcher Keene (parents of Lady Astor).

Virginia Episcopal School opened its doors to students in September 1916. Jett Hall was completed the same year under the direction of Frederick H. Brooke, a prominent Washington architect. Pendleton Hall was completed in 1918, enabling enrollment to be increased from sixty-three to one-hundred eleven boys. In 1919, Langhorne Memorial Chapel was consecrated. This was followed by the opening of Barksdale Gymnasium in 1920. As bishop of the newly created Diocese of Southwest Virginia, Bishop Jett would serve ex officio as chairman of the school's board of trustees until his retirement in 1938.

Originally all-white, the school was racially integrated in 1967, when the first two black students entered the school in a successful initiative organized by the Stouffer Foundation, which also arranged the integration of other elite prep schools in the South, including Saint Andrew's School in Florida, the Asheville School in North Carolina, and the Westminster School in Georgia.

== Notable alumni ==
- Dr. Henry C. Bourne Jr.: President, administrator, and faculty member at the Georgia Institute of Technology.
- Erskine Bowles: White House Chief of Staff under President Bill Clinton, co-chair of the bipartisan National Commission on Fiscal Responsibility and Reform under President Obama, and tenth Chancellor of the University of North Carolina public university system.
- Steve Cowper: Sixth governor of Alaska.
- Hardy Cross Dillard: United States judge of the International Court of Justice, former Dean of the University of Virginia School of Law.
- Thomas N. Frost (died 1969), member of the Virginia House of Delegates
- Paul Fulton Jr.: Former Dean of the University of North Carolina's Kenan-Flagler Business School; founder, former chairman of Bassett Furniture Industries, and former President of Sara Lee Corporation.
- William B. Harrison Jr.: Former CEO of J.P. Morgan Chase
- Phil Haynes: Professional football player for the Seattle Seahawks.
- Vivian Howard: Chef, restaurateur, television personality; star of PBS series “A Chef’s Life,” for which she has earned a Daytime Emmy for Outstanding Culinary Program.
- Jerrauld Jones: Former member of the Virginia House of Delegates.
- Sacha Killeya-Jones (born 1998): American-British basketball player for Hapoel Gilboa Galil of the Israeli Basketball Premier League.
- D. Holmes Morton: Physician, founder of the Clinic for Special Children in Strasburg, Pennsylvania; 2006 MacArthur Foundation Fellowship “Genius Grant” recipient; recipient of the Albert Schweitzer Prize for Humanitarianism; and one of Time magazine's “Heroes of Medicine” for his work in genetic illnesses (dropped out, later received honorary degree).
- Paul Taylor: Modern dance choreographer, received National Merit of Arts from President Clinton, MacArthur Foundation Fellowship “genius award.”
- Loretta Pieper: Youngest judge in German history at age 26; founded Webmiles AG internet company and Fine Arts Partners.
- Lee M. Thomas: Administrator of the Environmental Protection Agency under President Ronald Reagan.
