= Edward A. Temple =

Bishop of the Episcopal Diocese of Northwest Texas

The Right Reverend Edward Arthur Temple
- Missionary Bishop of Northwest Texas
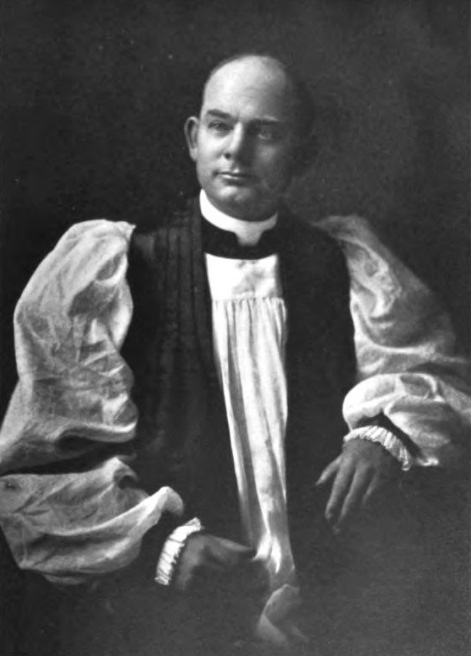
- Church: Episcopal Church
- See: Northwest Texas
- Elected: 1910
- In office: 1910–1924
- Successor: Eugene Cecil Seaman

Orders
- Ordination: 1896 by John B. Newton
- Consecration: December 15, 1910 by Daniel S. Tuttle

Personal details
- Born: September 5, 1867 Walkerton, Virginia, United States
- Died: January 10, 1924 (aged 56) Amarillo, Texas, United States
- Buried: Oakwood Cemetery
- Denomination: Anglican
- Parents: John Temple & Matilda Wright
- Spouse: Mary Craik Davis (m. 1909)
- Children: 2

Edward Arthur Temple (September 5, 1867 – January 10, 1924) was an American prelate of the Episcopal Church who was missionary bishop of the Missionary District of Northwest Texas, serving from 1910 to 1924.

== Early life and education ==
Temple was born in Walkerton, Virginia, on September 5, 1867, the son of John Temple (1834-1904) and Matilda Wright (1841-1907). He studied at the Virginia Polytechnic Institute and then at the Virginia Theological Seminary from which he graduated in 1895. In 1913, he was awarded an honorary Doctor of Divinity from the University of the South and another from the Virginia Theological Seminary, respectively.

== Ordained ministry ==
Temple was ordained deacon on June 25, 1895, by Bishop Francis McNeece Whittle of Virginia, at the Chapel of the Virginia seminary, and priest in 1896 by John B. Newton Coadjutor Bishop of Virginia. He then became rector of Calvary Church in Front Royal, Virginia, while in 1903, he became rector of St Paul’s Church in Waco, Texas, where he remained until 1910. He married Mary Craik Davis (1882-1962) on November 9, 1909, and they had two children.

== Bishop ==
In 1910 Temple was elected as the first missionary bishop of the Missionary District of Northwest Texas. He was consecrated bishop on December 15, 1910, with Presiding Bishop Daniel S. Tuttle as chief consecrator. During his episcopacy he help the build the missionary district and established 11 new church buildings. He died in office on January 10, 1924.
