= Ted Gulick =

American Episcopalian bishop (born 1948)

The Right Reverend Edwin Funsten Gulick Jr. D.D.
- Bishop of Kentucky
- Church: Episcopal Church
- Diocese: Kentucky
- Elected: November 6, 1993
- In office: 1994–2010
- Predecessor: David Reed
- Successor: Terry A. White
- Other posts: Provisional Bishop of Fort Worth (2009); Assistant Bishop of Virginia (2011-2017); Visiting Bishop in Virginia (2017-present)

Orders
- Ordination: 1974
- Consecration: April 17, 1994 by Edmund L. Browning

Personal details
- Born: Edwin Funsten Gulick Jr. July 27, 1948 (age 78) Fauquier County, Virginia, United States
- Denomination: Anglican
- Parents: Edwin Funsten Gulick & Nellie Comer Caskie
- Spouse: Barbara Lichtfuss
- Children: 3
- Education: University of Lynchburg

Edwin Funsten Gulick Jr. (born July 27, 1948), known as Ted Gulick, was the seventh bishop of the Episcopal Diocese of Kentucky, and since 2011 has served as assistant bishop in the Episcopal Diocese of Virginia, with special responsibility for pastoral ministry.

== Early life and education ==
Born and raised in Fauquier County, Virginia, where his family worshipped at St. Stephen's Episcopal Church in Catlett, Gulick attended summer camp at the diocesan facility, Shrine Mont, in Orkney Springs, Virginia, where he later worked as a counselor. He attended Lynchburg College and, after graduation in 1970, went to Alexandria, Virginia to earn a Master of Divinity degree from Virginia Theological Seminary, on whose faculty he would later serve.

== Ministry ==
After his ordination as deacon in 1973, Gulick served as assistant rector of Trinity Church in Towson, Maryland, where he was ordained as a priest the following year. He served as rector of Grace Church, Elkridge, Maryland from 1976 until 1982, when Rev. Gulick was called to serve St. Stephen's Episcopal Church in Newport News, Virginia.

After two decades of pastoral experience, Gulick was called to become bishop of the Episcopal Diocese of Kentucky, which then had 34 congregations. Presiding Bishop Edmund L. Browning led the consecration service in 1994, assisted by Frank Vest of the Episcopal Diocese of Southern Virginia and suffragan bishop Frank Clayton Matthews of Virginia. By the time of his retirement in 2010, attendance had increased 30%.

In January 2006, Gulick was nominated for Presiding Bishop of the Episcopal Church, but Katharine Jefferts Schori was elected at the General Convention of the Episcopal Church in the United States of America in Columbus, Ohio. On the national level, he served two terms on the Standing Committee on Ecumenical and Inter Religious Relations, co-chaired the Anglican Roman Catholic Dialog USA beginning in 1997, and served as one of the Episcopal Church's representatives on the Consultation on Church Union 1995–2000. In 2001, Archbishop George Carey appointed him to serve on the International Anglican Roman Catholic Commission on Unity and Mission.

In late 2008, Gulick agreed to assist part-time at the Episcopal Diocese of Fort Worth, whose bishop Jack Iker and many parishes had announced they would split from the Episcopal Church and join the Inaugural Provincial Assembly for the Anglican Church in North America. Gulick held both that position and his original ministry in Kentucky until the Fort Worth diocese elected retired bishop C. Wallis Ohl Jr. of North Texas as its bishop late in 2009. Gulick retired in 2010, after assisting Schori and several others to consecrate Terry A. White to succeed him as Kentucky's bishopric.

On January 1, 2011, Gulick became assistant bishop of his native Diocese of Virginia, assisting the diocesan bishop, Shannon Johnston.

== See also ==
- List of Episcopal bishops of the United States
- Historical list of the Episcopal bishops of the United States

Episcopal Church (USA) titles
Preceded by David Benson Reed	7th Bishop of Kentucky; 1994–2010	Succeeded by Terry A. White
