= Charles Clingman =

American bishop (1883–1971)

The Right Reverend Charles Clingman D.D., D.H.L.
- Bishop of Kentucky
- Church: Episcopal Church
- Diocese: Kentucky
- Elected: January 24, 1936
- In office: 1936–1954
- Predecessor: Charles E. Woodcock
- Successor: Charles G. Marmion

Orders
- Ordination: December 20, 1908 by Lewis W. Burton
- Consecration: April 22, 1936 by James De Wolf Perry

Personal details
- Born: January 19, 1883 Covington, Kentucky, U.S.
- Died: November 2, 1971 (aged 88) Ponte Vedra Beach, Florida, U.S.
- Buried: Cave Hill Cemetery; Louisville, Kentucky, U.S.
- Denomination: Anglican
- Parents: Charles Clingman & Mary Ellen Hartsough
- Spouse: Elizabeth Florence Core (m. Oct. 21, 1909)
- Children: Robert Core Clingman
- Education: Kenyon College

Charles Clingman (January 19, 1883 - November 2, 1971) was an American prelate who served as the forth Bishop of Kentucky from 1936 till 1954.

== Early life and education ==
Clingman was born on January 19, 1883, in Covington, Kentucky to Charles Clingman and Mary Ellen Hartsough. He graduated with a Bachelor of Arts from Kenyon College in 1905, and then from the Virginia Theological Seminary in 1908. He was awarded a Doctor of Humane Letters in 1931 from Kenyon and a Doctor of Divinity from the Virginia Seminary in 1928 and from the University of the South in 1928, respectively.

== Ordained ministry ==
Clingman was ordained deacon on December 29, 1907, and priest on December 20, 1908, by Bishop Lewis W. Burton of Lexington. In 1908, he became rector of St Paul's Church in Newport, Kentucky, while in 1913, he transferred to the Church of the Incarnation in Dallas, Texas to serve as its rector. From 1918 till 1924, he was rector of Trinity Church in Houston, Texas, and between 1924 and 1936, he served as rector of the Church of the Advent in Birmingham, Alabama.

== Bishop ==
On January 24, 1936, Clingman was elected Bishop of Kentucky and was consecrated on April 22, 1936, by Presiding Bishop James De Wolf Perry. He retained the post till his retirement in 1954.

Episcopal Church (USA) titles
Preceded by Charles E. Woodcock	4th Bishop of Kentucky; 1936–1954	Succeeded by Charles G. Marmion
