= William Franklin (assistant bishop of Peterborough) =

British Anglican bishop

- Assistant Bishop of Peterborough
- Diocese: Diocese of Peterborough
- In office: 1978–1986
- Other posts: Bishop of Colombia (1972–1978); Honorary assistant bishop, Diocese of Canterbury (1987–1992)

Orders
- Ordination: 1940 (deacon); 1941 (priest) by Geoffrey Fisher
- Consecration: 1972

Personal details
- Born: 16 July 1916
- Died: 11 February 1998 (aged 81)
- Denomination: Anglican
- Parents: George & Mary
- Spouse: Winifred
- Children: two

William Alfred Franklin (16 July 1916 – 11 February 1998) was a British Anglican bishop who served as Bishop of Colombia (in the Episcopal Church, USA, 1972–1978) and as full-time Assistant Bishop of Peterborough (in the Church of England, 1978–1986).

== Early life and family ==
William Alfred Franklin was born on 16 July 1916, the son of George Amos Franklin and Mary Anne Catherine Franklin. He was schooled in London and trained for the ministry at Kelham Theological College. He married Winifred Agnes Jarvis in 1945; they went on to have one son and one daughter.

== Ministry ==
=== London ===
He was ordained in the Church of England: made a deacon on Trinity Sunday 1940 (19 May) and ordained a priest the Trinity Sunday following (8 June 1941), both times by Geoffrey Fisher, Bishop of London, at St Paul's Cathedral. He served his first curacy at St John on Bethnal Green, as well as a Chaplain to the Air Training Corps (ATC) and to the University Settlements; in 1943 he resigned all these posts to become curate of St John's, Palmers Green, and chairman for Interdenominational Youth Activities (Edmonton area).

=== Argentina and Chile ===
In 1945, he migrated to Buenos Aires, Argentina, where he became Assistant Chaplain at St Saviour's, Belgrano and a teacher at Green's School. He moved in 1948 to serve as Rector of Holy Trinity, Lomas de Zamora; Domestic Chaplain to Ivor Evans, Bishop in Argentina; Secretary of the Diocesan Board of Missions; and Chaplain to St Alban's College (i.e. secondary/high school), Lomas de Zamora. Relocating to Chile in 1958, he served as Rector, Canon and Sub-Dean of St Andrew's Cathedral, Santiago (Anglican Diocese of Chile); Chaplain to the Grange School and Founder and Chairman of the Ecumenical Group in Chile. In 1964, he was made an Officer of the Order of the British Empire (OBE).

=== Colombia ===
The next year, Franklin migrated to Colombia, as Rector of St Alban's, Bogotá, and (from 1966) Archdeacon of the diocese. At the 1971 diocesan convention in Cali, he was elected to become diocesan bishop of the Episcopal Diocese of Colombia; he was consecrated the following year. At the time of his election, the diocese's churchgoers were mostly Anglophones, but by the time of his resignation in 1978, native Colombians formed the majority. He was one of several Anglophone bishops around the time to resign his See so that a native might be elected. He was the Founder and Editor of "Revista Anglicana", the official magazine of Arensa, the Association of Anglican Dioceses in the North of South America.

=== Return to England ===
He returned to England and took up the post of full-time Assistant Bishop of Peterborough (and an honorary canon of the Cathedral) until his retirement in 1986. Among his duties as Assistant Bishop, he was chairman of the diocesan Missionary Council and had pastoral care of retired clergy and their widows; he lived in Great Billing and developed Parkinson's. He was made canon emeritus of that cathedral on retirement, and he became an honorary assistant bishop of the Diocese of Canterbury, 1987–1992, where he had retired to Walmer.

Episcopal Church (USA) titles
Preceded by David Reed	Bishop of Colombia; 1972–1978	Succeeded by Bernardo Merino Botero
