= Thomas Underwood Dudley =

American bishop

The Right Reverend Thomas Underwood Dudley D.D., D.C.L., LL.D.
- Bishop of Kentucky
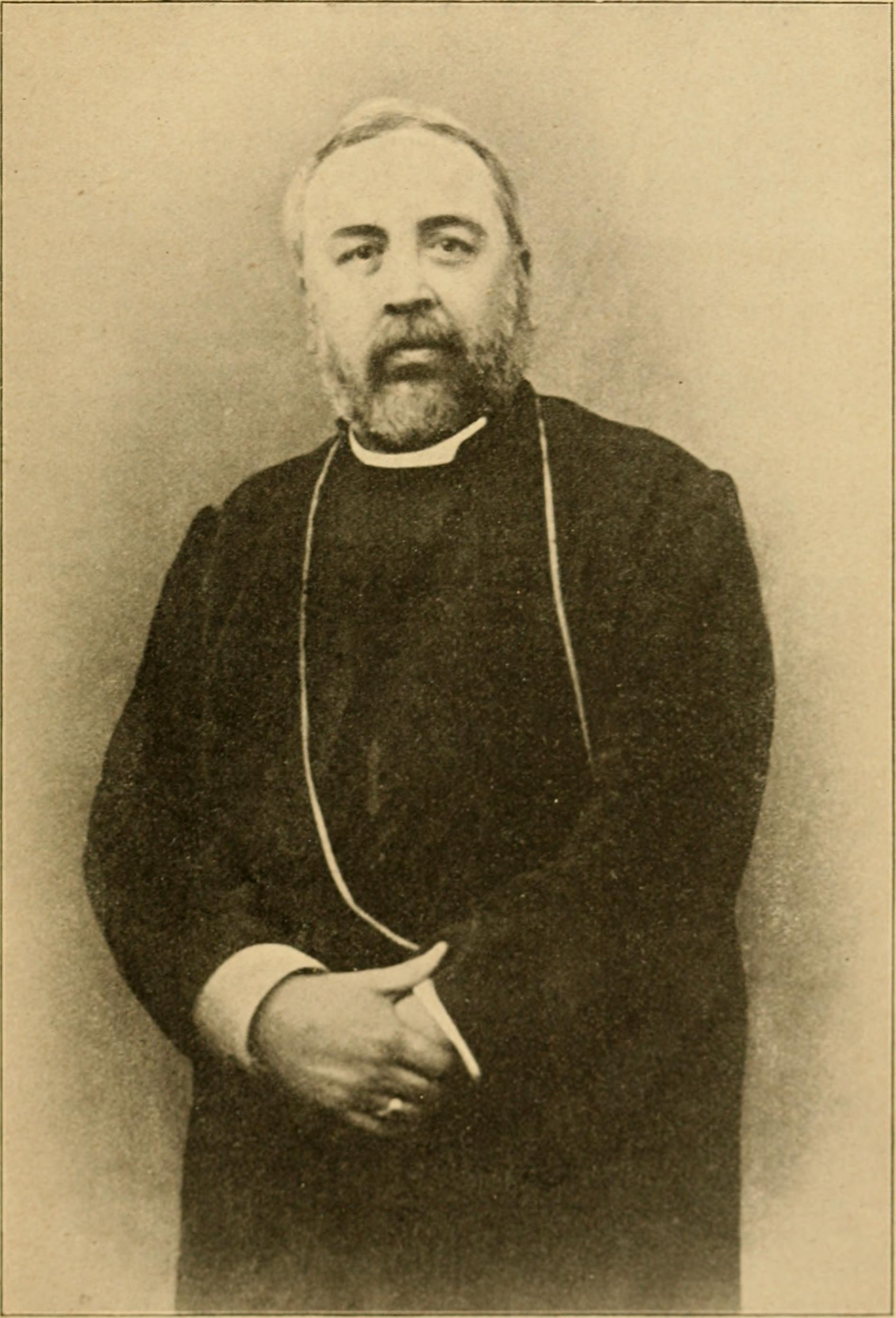
- Church: Episcopal Church
- Diocese: Kentucky
- In office: 1884–1904
- Predecessor: Benjamin B. Smith
- Successor: Charles E. Woodcock
- Previous post: Coadjutor Bishop of Kentucky (1875-1884)

Orders
- Ordination: June 26, 1868 by Francis McNeece Whittle
- Consecration: January 27, 1875 by Benjamin B. Smith

Personal details
- Born: September 26, 1837 Richmond, Virginia, U.S.
- Died: January 22, 1904 (aged 66) New York City, New York, U.S.
- Buried: Cave Hill Cemetery; Louisville, Kentucky, U.S.
- Denomination: Anglican
- Parents: Thomas Underwood Dudley & Martha Maria Friend
- Spouse: Fanny Berkeley Cochran (m. 1859, d. 1865); Virginia Fisher Rowland (m. 1869, d. 1876); Mary Elizabeth Aldrich (m. 1881)
- Children: 7
- Education: University of Virginia

Thomas Underwood Dudley (September 26, 1837 – January 22, 1904) was an American prelate who served as the second Bishop of Kentucky in The Episcopal Church.

== Early life and education ==
Dudley was born in Richmond, Virginia on September 26, 1837, the son of Thomas Underwood Dudley and Martha Maria Friend. He graduated from the University of Virginia in 1858, where he taught Latin and Greek until the American Civil War. He served in the Confederate States Army through the war, attaining the rank of Major. After the war, he studied at the Virginia Theological Seminary and graduated in 1867.

== Ordained ministry ==
Dudley was ordained deacon on June 28, 1867, and priest on June 26, 1868. He then became rector of Emmanuel Church in Harrisonburg, Virginia, before becoming rector of Christ Church in Baltimore, Maryland in 1869, where he remained till 1875.

== Bishop ==
In 1874 Dudley was elected Coadjutor Bishop of Kentucky and was consecrated on January 27, 1875, by Presiding Bishop and Bishop of Kentucky Benjamin B. Smith. He succeeded as bishop of the diocese in 1884, following Smith's death. At his death in 1904, Dudley was chairman of the House of Bishops and chancellor of Sewanee: The University of the South.

== See also ==
- List of Succession of Bishops for the Episcopal Church, USA

Episcopal Church (USA) titles
Preceded by Benjamin Bosworth Smith	2nd Bishop of Kentucky; 1884-1904 (Coadjutor Bishop, 1875-1884)	Succeeded by Charles E. Woodcock
