= Charles E. Woodcock =

American bishop

The Right Reverend Charles Edward Woodcock D.D., S.T.D.
- Bishop of Kentucky
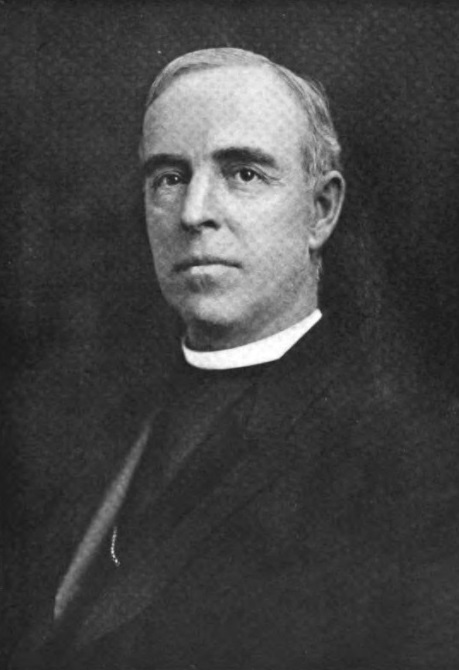
- Church: Episcopal Church
- Diocese: Kentucky
- Elected: November 16, 1904
- In office: 1905–1935
- Predecessor: Thomas Underwood Dudley
- Successor: Charles Clingman

Orders
- Ordination: May 30, 1883 by John Williams
- Consecration: January 25, 1905 by Daniel S. Tuttle

Personal details
- Born: June 12, 1854 New Britain, Connecticut, U.S.
- Died: March 12, 1940 (aged 85) Fort Myers, Florida, U.S.
- Buried: Cave Hill Cemetery; Louisville, Kentucky, U.S.
- Denomination: Anglican
- Parents: Joseph B. Woodcock & Caroline Shaw
- Spouse: Ellen Austin Warner (m. Nov. 20, 1884)

Charles Edward Woodcock (June 12, 1854 – March 12, 1940) was bishop of the Episcopal Diocese of Kentucky from 1905 to 1935. He was consecrated on January 25, 1905.

== Early life and education ==
Woodcock was born on June 12, 1854, in New Britain, Connecticut, the son of Joseph B. Woodcock and Caroline Shaw. He was educated in private and public schools. He also studied at Berkeley Divinity School from where he graduated with a Bachelor of Sacred Theology in 1882. He was awarded a Doctor of Sacred Theology from Hobart College in 1904, and a Doctor of Divinity from Sewanee: The University of the South in 1905, from Berkeley Divinity School in 1908 and from the University of Louisville in 1913.

== Ordained ministry ==
Woodcock was ordained deacon in 1882 and priest in 1883. In 1882, he became assistant at Grace Church in Baltimore, while in 1884, he became rector of the Church of the Ascension in New Haven, Connecticut. Between 1888 and 1900, he served as rector of Christ Church in Ansonia, Connecticut, later serving as rector of Saint John's Church in Detroit from 1900 till 1905.

== Bishop ==
On November 16, 1904, Woodcock was elected Bishop of Kentucky and was consecrated on January 25, 1905, with Presiding Bishop Daniel S. Tuttle as chief consecrator. He retired in 1935 and died five year later on March 12, 1940.

Episcopal Church (USA) titles
Preceded by Thomas Underwood Dudley	3rd Bishop of Kentucky; 1905–1935	Succeeded by Charles Clingman
