= Robert Carter Jett =

American Episcopal bishop (1865–1950)

The Right Reverend Robert Carter Jett D.D., LL.D.
- Bishop of Southwestern Virginia
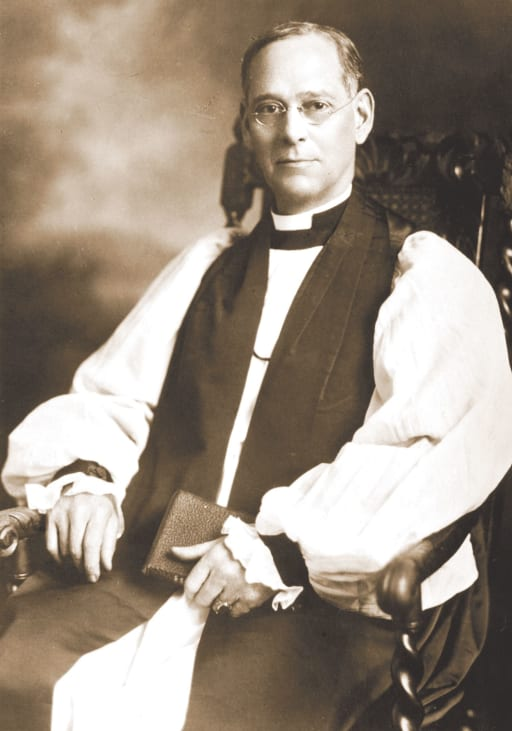
- Church: Episcopal Church
- Diocese: Southwestern Virginia
- Elected: December 10, 1919
- In office: 1920–1938
- Successor: Henry D. Phillips

Orders
- Ordination: 1890 by Alfred Magill Randolph
- Consecration: March 24, 1920 by Daniel S. Tuttle

Personal details
- Born: May 10, 1865 King George County, Virginia, United States
- Died: August 9, 1950 (aged 85) Roanoke, Virginia, United States
- Buried: Evergreen Burial Park
- Denomination: Anglican
- Parents: William Newton Jett & Virginia Mitchell
- Spouse: Annie Funston (m. 1890)
- Children: 2

Robert Carter Jett (May 10, 1865 – August 9, 1950) was bishop of the Episcopal Diocese of Southwestern Virginia from 1920 to 1938.

== Early life and education ==
Jett was born May 10, 1865, in King George County, Virginia, the son of William Newton Jett and Virginia Mitchell. he was educated at the public and private schools. he also studied at the Virginia Theological Seminary from where he graduated in 1889. He was granted an honorary Doctor of Divinity from Washington and Lee University in 1915.

== Ordained ministry ==
Jett was ordained deacon in 1898 by Bishop Francis McNeece Whittle and priest in 1890 by Bishop Alfred Magill Randolph. He served as assistant at Epiphany Church in Danville, Virginia from 1889 to 1890, and then became rector of Beckford Parish in Shenandoah County, Virginia from 1890 to 1893. In 1893 he became the first rector of Emmanuel Church in Staunton, Virginia, a post he retained till 1913 when he resigned to organize and eventually establish the Virginia Episcopal School, which he served as its first rector from 1916 to 1920.

== Bishop ==
On December 10, 1920, Jett was elected the first Bishop of Southwestern Virginia. He was consecrated on March 24, 1920, in Trinity Church, Staunton, Virginia, by Presiding Bishop Daniel S. Tuttle. In the first year of his episcopacy, Jett established a diocesan newspaper. He was deeply involved in community activities as an integral part of Christian commitment. Jett worked tirelessly, patiently, and faithfully to carry on the evangelical and missionary tradition of the Church in Virginia. He retired on May 17, 1938.
