= Karin MacPhail =

American bishop

Karin Lee MacPhail is an American Episcopal bishop currently serving as the 7th Bishop of Southwestern Virginia.

== Education ==
MacPhail holds a Bachelor of Arts degree in English and anthropology from the University of Texas and a Master of Divinity degree from the Virginia Theological Seminary. She worked in publishing in New York City before studying for ordination.

== Career ==
From 2004 to 2005 MacPhail was the associate rector of St. Paul’s Memorial Church in Charlottesville, Virginia, and a chaplain at the University of Virginia. She then held various roles in the Episcopal Diocese of Virginia, including as a camp chaplain and retreat leader. She served as priest-in-charge and, later, rector of Christ Church in Millwood, Virginia, from 2010 to 2015, and as priest-in-charge then rector of St. Elizabeth's Church in Roanoke, Virginia, from 2017 to 2026.

On January 31, 2026, MacPhail was elected to serve as the 7th Bishop of Southwestern Virginia, succeeding Mark Bourlakas. She was consecrated at St. John's Episcopal Church in Roanoke on June 13, 2026, with Presiding Bishop of the Episcopal Church of America Sean Rowe as chief consecrator.

== Personal life ==
MacPhail is married to the Rev. Alexander MacPhail, an Episcopal priest, with whom she has two children.
