= David Reed (bishop) =

American bishop (1927–2023)

The Right Reverend David Benson Reed D.D.
- Bishop of Kentucky
- Church: Episcopal Church
- Diocese: Kentucky
- In office: 1974–1994
- Predecessor: Charles G. Marmion
- Successor: Edwin F. Gulick
- Previous posts: Bishop of Colombia (1964-1972); Coadjutor Bishop of Kentucky (1972-1974)

Orders
- Ordination: February 14, 1952 by Reginald Heber Gooden
- Consecration: April 25, 1964 by Arthur C. Lichtenberger

Personal details
- Born: February 16, 1927 Tulsa, Oklahoma, U.S.
- Died: March 11, 2023 (aged 96)
- Denomination: Anglican
- Parents: Paul Spencer Reed & Bonnie Frances Taylor
- Spouse: Susan Henry Riggs (m. 1954, div); Catherine Camp Luckett (m. 1984)
- Children: 5
- Education: Harvard University

David Benson Reed (February 16, 1927 – March 11, 2023) was the first Bishop of Colombia and the sixth Bishop of Kentucky in the Episcopal Church.

== Early life and education ==
Reed was born in Tulsa, Oklahoma, on February 16, 1927, to Paul Spencer Reed and Bonnie Frances Taylor. He graduated from Harvard University with a Bachelor of Arts in 1948, and then with a Bachelor of Divinity from the Virginia Theological Seminary in 1951.

== Ordained ministry ==
Reed was ordained deacon in 1951. He then left for Costa Rica where he served at the Church of the Good Shepherd in San José. He was then ordained priest on February 14, 1952, by Reginald Heber Gooden, Bishop of the Panama Canal Zone in St Luke's Cathedral, Ancón, Panama. Between 1952 and 1958 he served numerous parishes in the Panama Canal Zone and Colombia. In 1958, he travelled back to the United States to serve as assistant in the Executive Council's Overseas Department in New York City. In 1962, he became vicar of St Matthew's Church in Rapid City, South Dakota, and served as a missionary to the Lakota Indians.

== Episcopacy ==
In 1963, Reed was elected as the first Episcopal Bishop of Colombia (which included Ecuador) and was consecrated on April 25, 1964, by Presiding Bishop Arthur C. Lichtenberger. Ultimately he spent a total of fifteen years in South America before returning to the United States. In 1972, Bishop Reed was elected Coadjutor Bishop under the fifth Bishop of Kentucky, Charles Gresham Marmion. In 1974, Bishop Marmion retired and Bishop Reed became sixth Bishop of Kentucky. By then, he was known as a strong supporter of diversity and inclusivity. His diocese was one of the first to appoint women as priests after the Episcopal Church convention approved such an action in 1976.

When the Rev. John Moore Hines announced that he would stop officiating at marriages and communion services as his protest against the Episcopal church's denial of the ordination of women to the priesthood and episcopate, Bishop David B. Reed consented to inhibit Hines from these duties until the last day of the next Episcopal General Convention (then scheduled for September 23, 1976). The church press release stated that the Bishop's inhibition indicated official recognition of Hines' protest.

In 1986, Bishop Reed led a year-long search to fill the deanship of Christ Church Cathedral in Louisville. On November 25, 1986, he and the cathedral chapter announced the selection of Rev. Geralyn Wolf, vicar of the 60-member St. Mary's church in Philadelphia. According to The Washington Post, Rev. Wolf is the first woman named to an Episcopal cathedral deanship since the American church allowed the ordination of women in 1976. The Post article also stated that a cathedral deanship is often the first step toward an ultimate selection as a bishop. In 1994, upon Bishop Reed's retirement, Edwin Funsten Gulick was elected as Bishop of Kentucky.

== Death ==
Reed died on March 11, 2023, at the age of 96.

Episcopal Church (USA) titles
New title	Bishop of Colombia; 1964–1972	Succeeded by William Franklin
Preceded by Charles G. Marmion	Bishop of Kentucky; 1974–1994	Succeeded by Ted Gulick
