= Episcopal Diocese of Northwest Texas =

Diocese of the Episcopal Church in the United States

Coordinates: 33.5845°N 101.8567°W

Diocese of Northwest Texas Diœcesis Texensis Septentrionalis

Location
- Country: United States
- Ecclesiastical province: Province VII

Statistics
- Congregations: 25 (2023)
- Members: 4,788 (2023)

Information
- Denomination: Episcopal Church
- Established: October 31, 1958

Current leadership
- Bishop: James Scott Mayer

Map
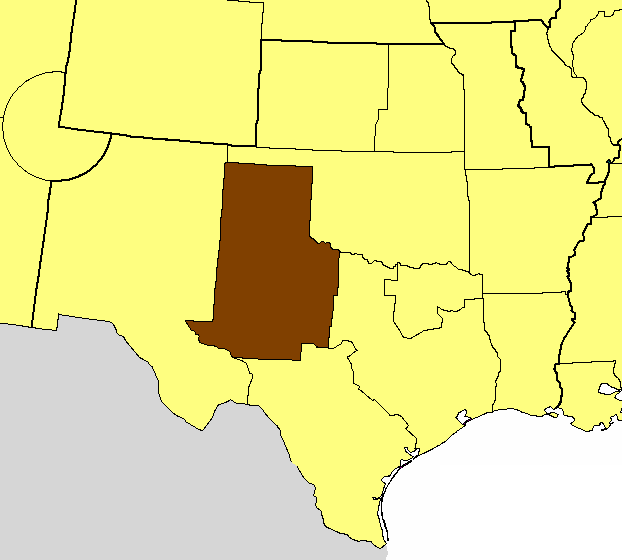
- Location of the Diocese of Northwest Texas

Website
- nwtdiocese.org

The Episcopal Diocese of Northwest Texas is one of the Dioceses of the Episcopal Church in the United States of America. It is in Province 7. The diocese is based in Lubbock, Texas.

In 2024, the diocese reported average Sunday attendance (ASA) of 1,350 persons, a relative decrease from 1,774 in 2016. No membership statistics were reported in 2024 parochial reports. The 25 congregations of the diocese had $6,826,290 in plate and pledge income in 2024. Between 2015 and 2023, reported membership declined from 6,477 to 4,788.

== History ==
The Missionary District of North Texas was created in 1910 by the General Convention. It incorporated territories previously part of the Diocese of Dallas and the Diocese of West Texas. In 1958, the Missionary District of North Texas was established as the Diocese of Northwest Texas. The diocese has no cathedral.

== Bishops ==
- Missionary District of Northern Texas
1. Edward Arthur Temple, 1910-1924
2. Eugene Cecil Seaman, 1925-1945
3. George H. Quarterman, 1946-1958
- Diocese of Northwest Texas
1. George H. Quarterman, 1958-1972
2. Willis Ryan Henton, 1972-1980
3. Sam Byron Hulsey, 1980-1997
4. Charles Wallis Ohl, 1997-2008
5. James Scott Mayer, 2009–present
