= Episcopal Diocese of Western Louisiana =

Diocese of the Episcopal Church in the United States

Coordinates: 31.3177°N 92.4394°W

Diocese of Western Louisiana Dioecesis Louisianae Occidentalis Diócesis de Luisiana Occidental

Location
- Country: United States
- Territory: Acadia, Allen, Avoyelles, Beauregard, Bienville, Bossier, Caddo, Calcasieu, Caldwell, Cameron, Catahoula, Claiborne, Concordia, Desoto, East Carroll, Evangeline, Franklin, Grant, Iberia, Jackson, Jefferson Davis, Lafayette, Lasalle, Lincoln, Madison, Morehouse, Natchitoches, Ouachita, Rapides, Red River, Richland, Sabine, St. Landry, St. Martin, Tensas, Union, Vermilion, Vernon, Webster, West Carroll, Winn
- Ecclesiastical province: Province VII

Statistics
- Congregations: 42 (2024)
- Members: 7,643 (2023)

Information
- Denomination: The Episcopal Church
- Rite: Episcopal
- Established: October 10, 1979
- Cathedral: St Mark's Cathedral
- Language: English, Spanish

Current leadership
- Bishop: Jacob Wayne Owensby

Map
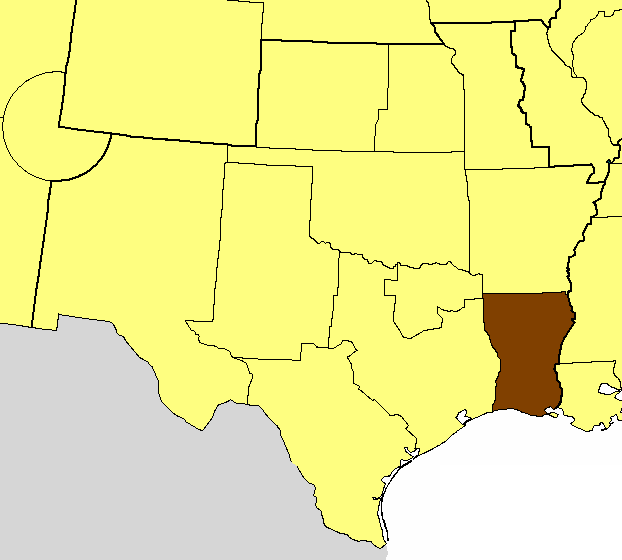
- Location of the Diocese of Western Louisiana

Website
- https://epiwla.org/

The Episcopal Diocese of Western Louisiana is the diocese of the Episcopal Church in the United States of America whose territory comprises the western part of the state of Louisiana, including Shreveport.

In 2024, the diocese reported average Sunday attendance (ASA) of 2,085 persons, down from ASA of 3,055 in 2015. The most recent membership statistics (2023) showed 7,643 persons. Public membership figures cited a decline in membership from 8,678 in 2015 to 7,643 in 2023. No membership statistics were reported in 2024 parochial reports. The 42 reporting congregations of the diocese had $9,073,095 in plate and pledge income in 2024.

== Organization ==
Organized through division of the Episcopal Diocese of Louisiana in 1979, the diocese and its parishes sponsor nine parochial schools and preschools. The diocese is part of Province VII.

There have been four bishops of Western Louisiana:

1. Willis R. Henton (1980–1990)
2. Robert Jefferson Hargrove, Jr. (1990–2001)
3. D. Bruce MacPherson (2002–2012)
4. Jacob Wayne Owensby (July 2012–present)

The diocesan cathedral is St. Mark's, Shreveport; the diocesan offices are in the former parish hall of Mt. Olivet Chapel in Pineville.
