= C. Wallis Ohl Jr. =

American bishop

The Right Reverend Charles Wallis Ohl Jr.
- Provisional Bishop of Fort Worth
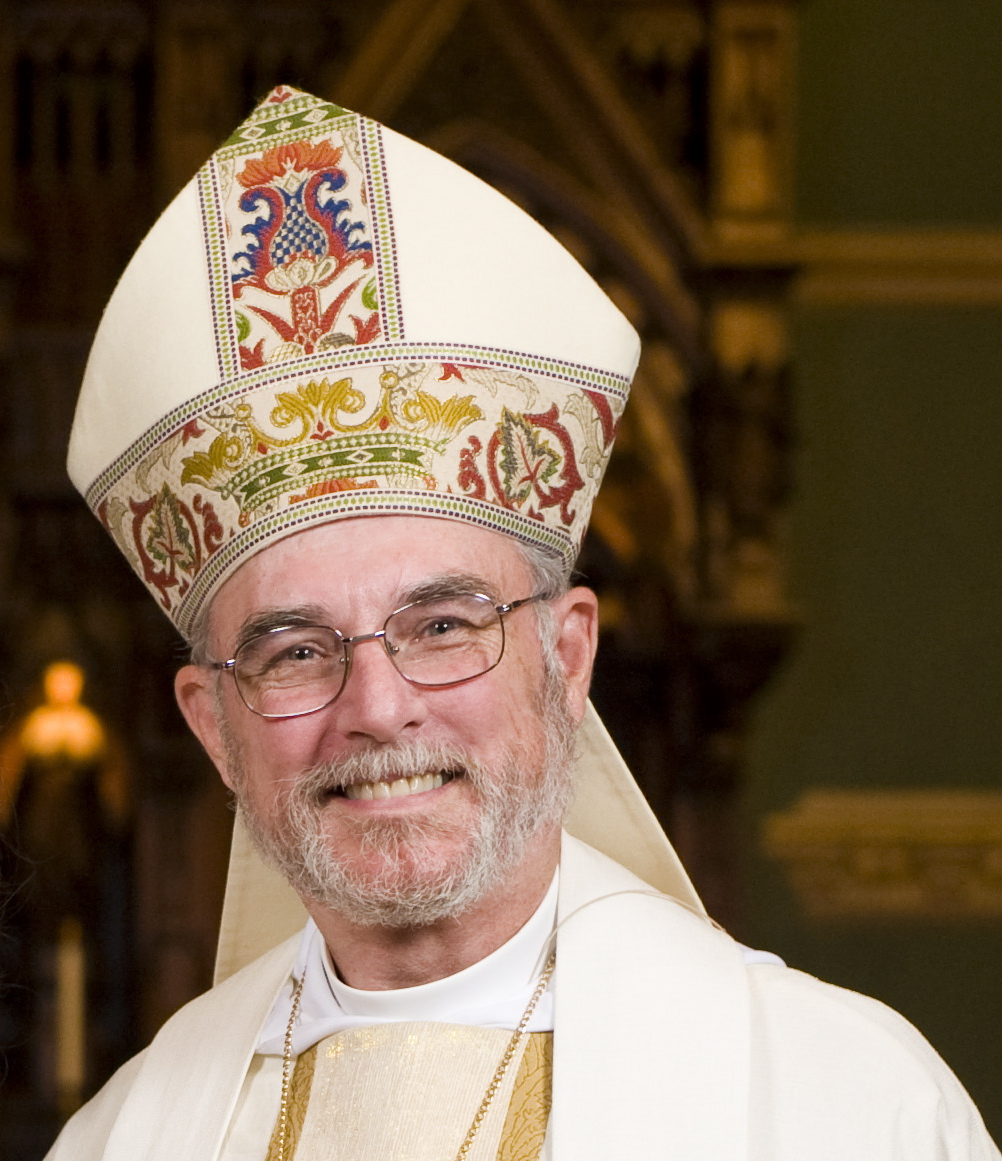
- Church: Episcopal Church
- Diocese: Fort Worth
- Elected: November 2009
- In office: 2009-2012
- Predecessor: Ted Gulick
- Successor: Rayford B. High Jr.
- Previous post: Bishop of Northwest Texas (1997-2008)

Orders
- Ordination: December 1973 (deacon); June 1974 (priest)
- Consecration: June 28, 1997 by Charlie F. McNutt

Personal details
- Born: October 21, 1943 (age 82) Bay City, Texas, United States
- Denomination: Anglican
- Spouse: Sheila Byrd
- Children: 3

Charles Wallis Ohl Jr. (born October 21, 1943) is an American bishop who was the Provisional Bishop of Fort Worth in The Episcopal Church. Jack Iker had been the Bishop of Fort Worth in the Episcopal Church until a super-majority of the diocese voted to dissolve its union with the General Convention at the 2007 and 2008 diocesan conventions. Those members of the diocese who wished to remain in the Episcopal Church met in a special convention on February 7, 2009. Edwin F. Gulick Jr., the Bishop of Kentucky who was planning to retire soon, was appointed as Provisional Bishop. In November 2009, the Annual Convention of that diocese elected Ohl as their new provisional bishop.

== Biography ==
Charles Wallis Ohl Jr. was born in Bay City, Texas in 1943. His parents, a doctor and a nurse, raised him in Chickasha, Oklahoma, where he lived until graduating from high school in 1961. He then attended the University of the South, where he received a BA in English literature in 1965. For the next six years he worked as in consumer finance. During that time he also spent two years serving in the US Marine Corps, completing his active duty as a corporal (E-4). In 1971, he moved to Nashotah, Wisconsin with his wife, Sheila, to begin seminary at Nashotah House in preparation for becoming an Episcopal priest. He was ordained deacon in December 1973 and priest in June 1974, both by Bishop Chilton Robert Powell, then Bishop of Oklahoma.

During his time as a priest, Ohl served several parishes, first in Oklahoma and then in Colorado. He began his ordained ministry at St. Paul's Cathedral in Oklahoma City before becoming the vicar of St. Michael's, a new mission the diocese had planted in Norman, Oklahoma. After four years leading the parish as a mission, it was admitted to the diocese as a full parish. He continued to serve the parish until 1991 when St. Michael the Archangel in Colorado Springs, Colorado called him to be their next rector.

In 1997, the Episcopal Diocese of Northwest Texas elected Ohl to be their next bishop. He was consecrated as the fourth Bishop of Northwest Texas at the diocese's annual convention. As bishop, he served for nine years as a member of the Task Force on Title IV (the discipline canons for the Episcopal Church) and as a member of the Title IV Review Committee, the group which adjudicates alleged Title IV violations by clergy.

While Bishop of Northwest Texas, Ohl was a moderate. At the Thirteenth Lambeth Conference in 1998, he voted in favor of Resolution I.10 which rejected "homosexual practice as incompatible with Scripture". However, at the 73rd General Convention of the Episcopal Church in 2000, he voted in favor of adding a blessing for same-gender unions to the Book of Occasional Services and, in a separate resolution (D039), in favor of recognizing the fidelity and faithfulness of both marriage and other lifelong committed relationships in the church. At the 74th Convention in 2003, he voted to consent to the election of Gene Robinson, a gay partnered priest, as Bishop of New Hampshire. Shortly thereafter, however, Ohl also affirmed the importance of the Windsor Process—a process laid out a commission appointed by the Archbishop of Canterbury with the intent of healing the divisions and tensions that existed in the Anglican Communion following Robinson's consecration. Ohl has even been categorized by some as a "Windsor Bishop."

Also while Ohl was Bishop of Northwest Texas, in 2005 the rector and a majority of St. Nicholas Episcopal Church in Midland, Texas elected to leave the Episcopal Church. This, and the following departure of Good Shepherd Episcopal Church in San Angelo and of Holy Trinity in Midland, made him the center of lawsuits and controversy for a time.

He retired as Bishop of Northwest Texas in 2008, intending to "fade away into relative obscurity". The same year the Bishop of Fort Worth and a majority of the diocese departed the Episcopal Church. Edwin F. Gulick Jr., the Bishop of Kentucky, who was planning to retire soon, was appointed as Provisional Bishop. In 2009, Ohl was invited to celebrate an ordination service and began to feel a call to serve the Diocese of Fort Worth. Shortly thereafter, he was invited to be considered for election as their new Provisional Bishop. He accepted and was elected in November 2009. He served until November 2012.

== See also ==
- List of Succession of Bishops for the Episcopal Church, USA

Preceded by Edwin F. Gulick Jr. (Provisional), Jack Iker (Ordinary)	Provisional Bishop of Fort Worth; 13 November 2009 – November 2015	Succeeded by Raymond High
