= Episcopal Church in North Texas =

Diocese of the Episcopal Church in the United States

Diocese of The Episcopal Church in North Texas

Location
- Country: United States
- Ecclesiastical province: VII
- Headquarters: Fort Worth, Texas

Statistics
- Parishes: 13
- Members: 3,595 (2021)

Information
- Denomination: Episcopal Church
- Established: November 13, 1982
- Dissolved: July 11, 2022

Leadership
- Bishop: Scott Mayer (Provisional); Rayford B. High, Jr. (Assistant Bishop)

Map
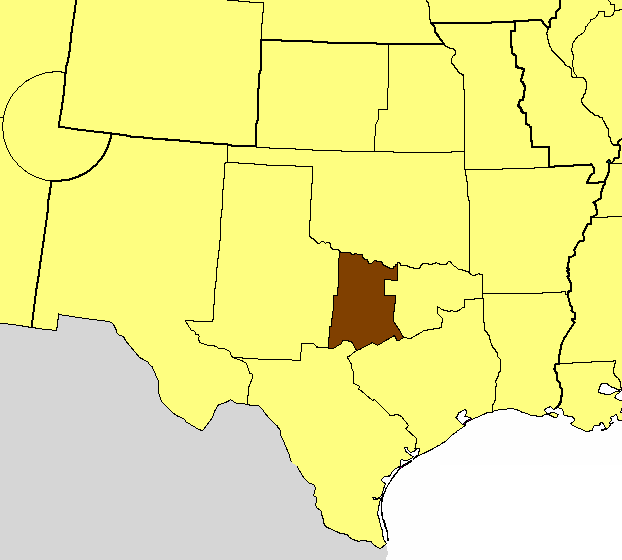
- Location of the Episcopal Church in North Texas at its dissolution

Website
- ecntx.org

The Episcopal Church in North Texas was a diocese of the Episcopal Church from 1982 to its merger with the Diocese of Texas in 2022. The diocese included a geographic area of 24 counties in the north central part of Texas. As of 2021, it includes 13 churches, including a number of other congregations in the process of reorganization. The jurisdiction was the site of a major schism in 2008. This schism was the result of the diocese's bishop, Jack Iker, leading the majority of clergy and parishes to join the Anglican Church of North America as the Episcopal Diocese of Fort Worth. The Episcopal Church diocese is headquartered in Fort Worth, Texas. It announced on April 22, 2022, that it would seek reunion with the Episcopal Diocese of Texas. The merger was finalized by the 80th General Convention of the Episcopal Church in the United States of America on July 11, 2022.

Between 2015 and 2021, reported membership declined from 4,674 to 3,595.

== History ==
The diocese came into being in 1983 with the administrative division of the increasingly large Episcopal Diocese of Dallas. Along with its parent Diocese of Dallas, the Diocese of Fort Worth was one of the originators of a strong conservative movement within the Episcopal Church. Fort Worth and Dallas clergy and parishes have both had a long history of leadership in the Anglo-Catholic faction within American Anglicanism.

After the consecration of an openly gay New Hampshire bishop, Gene Robinson, most of the parishes in the diocese affiliated with the Anglican Communion Network, an association of dioceses, parishes, and clergy opposing what its members considered a liberal shift in doctrine and practice that abandoned traditional teaching and discipline. There were also, however, some parishes and individuals who took a moderate or progressive position.

Following the election of Katharine Jefferts Schori as the 26th Presiding Bishop of the Episcopal Church on June 18, 2006, Bishop Jack Iker petitioned Rowan Williams, the Archbishop of Canterbury, to place the diocese under the jurisdiction of another primate. This appeal was joined by several other conservative dioceses but Archbishop Williams did not indicate any willingness to grant the request.

At the 26th annual convention of the diocese, on November 15, 2008, delegates voted by over 80% to have the diocese become part of the Anglican Province of the Southern Cone instead of being part of the Episcopal Church, even though there was no provision in the constitution and canons of the Province of the Southern Cone for admitting extraterritorial dioceses.

Bishop Jefferts Schori declared on November 21, 2008, that Bishop Jack Iker was inhibited from exercising his office as a bishop in the Episcopal Church because by supporting the resolution to leave the Episcopal Church he had violated Title IV, Canon 9, and abandoned "the Doctrine, Discipline or Worship of the Church". In turn, Iker rejected the authority of the Presiding Bishop. Thus, the Presiding Bishop, on December 5, with the advice and consent of the church's advisory council (bishops who are the presidents or vice-presidents of each province), accepted Iker's deemed renunciation and declared the Fort Worth diocese without a bishop. The Standing Committee of the diocese, which in the absence of a bishop would then be the highest ecclesiastical authority of the diocese, regarded the inhibition of Iker as an "illegal, unconstitutional, and uncanonical attempt to interfere with the rights and ministry of a diocese of another province of the Anglican Communion", thus affirming their unanimous decision to leave the Episcopal Church and realign with the Southern Cone. The Presiding Bishop then declared the diocesan leadership vacant and called a Special Convention in response to the wishes of the roughly 8,000 members of the diocese in 17 parishes who wished to remain in the Episcopal Church and had therefore been "heartened" by the inhibition of Bishop Iker.

The Special Convention was held in Fort Worth, at Trinity Episcopal Church, on February 7, 2009. The Right Reverend Edwin "Ted" Gulick, Jr., Bishop of Kentucky, was chosen as provisional bishop and other vacant diocesan offices were filled. Although one of the last dioceses in the Episcopal Church to refuse to ordain women, the first woman was ordained in November 2009 and a new provisional bishop, C. Wallis Ohl, was named.

Ever since the 2008 schism, a legal battle has been under way between the ACNA-affiliated diocese and the Episcopal Church-affiliated diocese. The main point of contention has been control over parish and diocesan property. On April 5, 2018, the Texas Court of Appeals, Second District, affirmed a trial court's ruling that "the Corporation of the Episcopal Diocese of Fort Worth holds legal title to all properties." The court summed up the dispute as being about "who has the right to control the Corporation and EDFW as legal entities." The opinion concluded that the ACNA-affiliated group's "actions, as corporate trustees, were invalid under Texas law after disaffiliation in 2008." Further, "Under Texas Corporations Law, the articles of incorporation and bylaws . . . means that the TEC-affiliated EDFW controls appointment to the Corporation’s board." The Appeals Court remanded the case to the trial court for further proceedings. The ACNA-affiliated group indicated that they would appeal the decision to the Texas Supreme Court.

On May 22, 2020, the Supreme Court of Texas issued its decision holding that "(1) resolution of this property dispute does not require consideration of an ecclesiastical question, (2) under the governing documents, the withdrawing faction is the Episcopal Diocese of Fort Worth, and (3) the trial court properly granted summary judgment in the withdrawing faction's favor. We therefore reverse the court of appeals' contrary decision." The Texas Supreme Court also reinstated the judgment of the trial court, which, among other things, "permanently enjoined TEC's clergy and leaders from acting as 'The Episcopal Diocese of Fort Worth.'"

Bishop Scott Mayer, who supported the TEC faction, in a letter to his followers, wrote "This decision is a disappointment to us all, but as followers of Jesus Christ, we live in hope. Presiding Bishop Michael B. Curry joins me in acknowledging our disappointment and urging all of us to be gentle with one another during this trying time, with the important goal of continuing our worship of God and our ministries in this diocese in as uninterrupted [a] manner as possible. Now I, other diocesan leaders, and our legal team have to make decisions about our next steps.” On February 22, 2021, the United States Supreme Court declined to review the Texas Supreme Court's decision.

== Bishops ==
1. A. Donald Davies 1975-1985
2. Clarence Cullam Pope 1986-1994
3. Jack Leo Iker 1995-2009
  * Ted Gulick (Provisional) 2009-2009
  * C. Wallis Ohl, Jr. (Provisional) 2009-2012
  * Rayford B. High, Jr. (Provisional) 2012-2015
  * James Scott Mayer (Provisional) 2015–2022
