= Willis R. Henton =

American bishop

The Right Reverend Willis Ryan Henton
- Bishop of Western Louisiana
- Church: Episcopal Church
- Diocese: Northwest Texas
- Elected: April 18, 1980
- In office: 1980–1990
- Successor: Robert Jefferson Hargrove Jr.
- Previous posts: Coadjutor Bishop of Northwest Texas (1971–1972); Bishop of Northwest Texas (1972–1980)

Orders
- Ordination: March 7, 1953 by Lyman Ogilby
- Consecration: June 11, 1971 by John Allin

Personal details
- Born: July 5, 1925 McCook, Nebraska, United States
- Died: February 15, 2006 (aged 80) New Iberia, Louisiana, United States
- Buried: Mansfield Cemetery, Mansfield, Louisiana
- Denomination: Anglican
- Parents: Burr M. Henton & Clara Vaire Godown
- Spouse: Martha Somerville Bishop (m. 1952; died 2005)
- Children: 1
- Education: University of Nebraska at Kearney; General Theological Seminary

Willis Ryan Henton (July 5, 1925 – February 15, 2006) was an American prelate of the Episcopal Church who served as the first Bishop of Western Louisiana between 1980 and 1990. Previously he was Bishop of Northwest Texas from 1972 until 1980.

== Early life and education ==
Henton was born on July 5, 1925, in McCook, Nebraska, one of eight children born to Burr M. Henton and Clara Vaire Godown. He was raised in southwestern Nebraska and was educated at Danbury High School. After graduating from high school, he enlisted in the infantry to serve during World War II. After the war he studied at the University of Nebraska at Kearney from where he earned a Bachelor of Arts in 1949. He then attended the General Theological Seminary and graduated with a Bachelor of Sacred Theology in 1952, and awarded an honorary Doctor of Sacred Theology in 1972. The University of the South also awarded him a Doctor of Divinity in 1972. Henton married Martha Somerville Bishop on June 7, 1952, and together had one son.

== Ordained ministry ==
Henton was ordained deacon on April 28, 1952, at the Church of the Holy Communion in Norwood, New Jersey, by Bishop Benjamin M. Washburn of Newark. He then left with his wife to undertake mission work in the Mountain Province of the Philippines. Whilst there, he was ordained priest on March 7, 1953, by Suffragan Bishop Lyman Ogilby of the Philippines. Between 1952 and 1956, he served at St Benedict's Mission and at Easter School in Besao. In 1956 he returned to the United States and became curate of Church of St. Luke in the Fields in New York City. He was then appointed rector of Christ Memorial Church in Mansfield, Louisiana, in 1958, and remained there until 1961. From 1961 until 1964, he served as rector of St Augustine's Church in Baton Rouge, Louisiana, and then between 1964 and 1971, he was as archdeacon for Christian education for the Episcopal Diocese of Louisiana.

== Bishop ==
In 1971, Henton was elected Coadjutor Bishop of Northwest Texas and was consecrated on June 11, 1971, by Presiding Bishop John Allin. He succeeded as diocesan bishop in 1972 and remained in office until 1980, when he was elected as the first Bishop of Western Louisiana on April 18, 1980. He announced resignation to the standing committee of the Diocese of Northwest Texas on April 26, 1980. He was the first diocesan bishop in the Episcopal Church to be transferred from one diocese to another. He remained in Western Louisiana until his retirement in 1990. He died on February 15, 2006, at the Iberia Medical Center in New Iberia, Louisiana.
