= Episcopal Diocese of Kentucky =

Episcopal Church diocese in the US

Coordinates: 37°30′N 86°10′W

Diocese of Kentucky

Location
- Country: United States
- Ecclesiastical province: Province IV

Statistics
- Congregations: 32 (2024)
- Members: 6,409 (2023)

Information
- Denomination: Episcopal Church
- Established: July 8, 1829
- Cathedral: Christ Church Cathedral

Current leadership
- Bishop: Terry A. White

Map
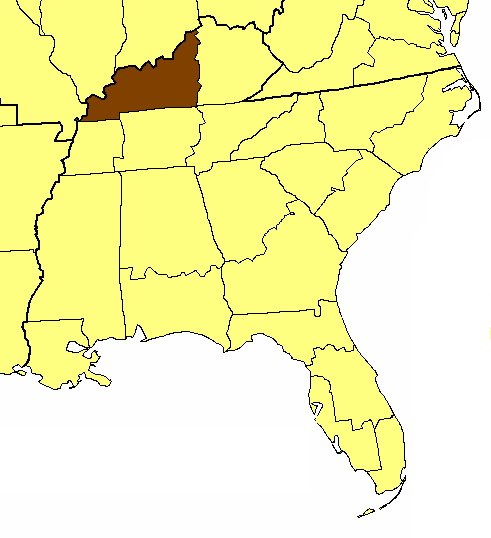
- Location of the Diocese of Kentucky

Website
- www.episcopalky.org

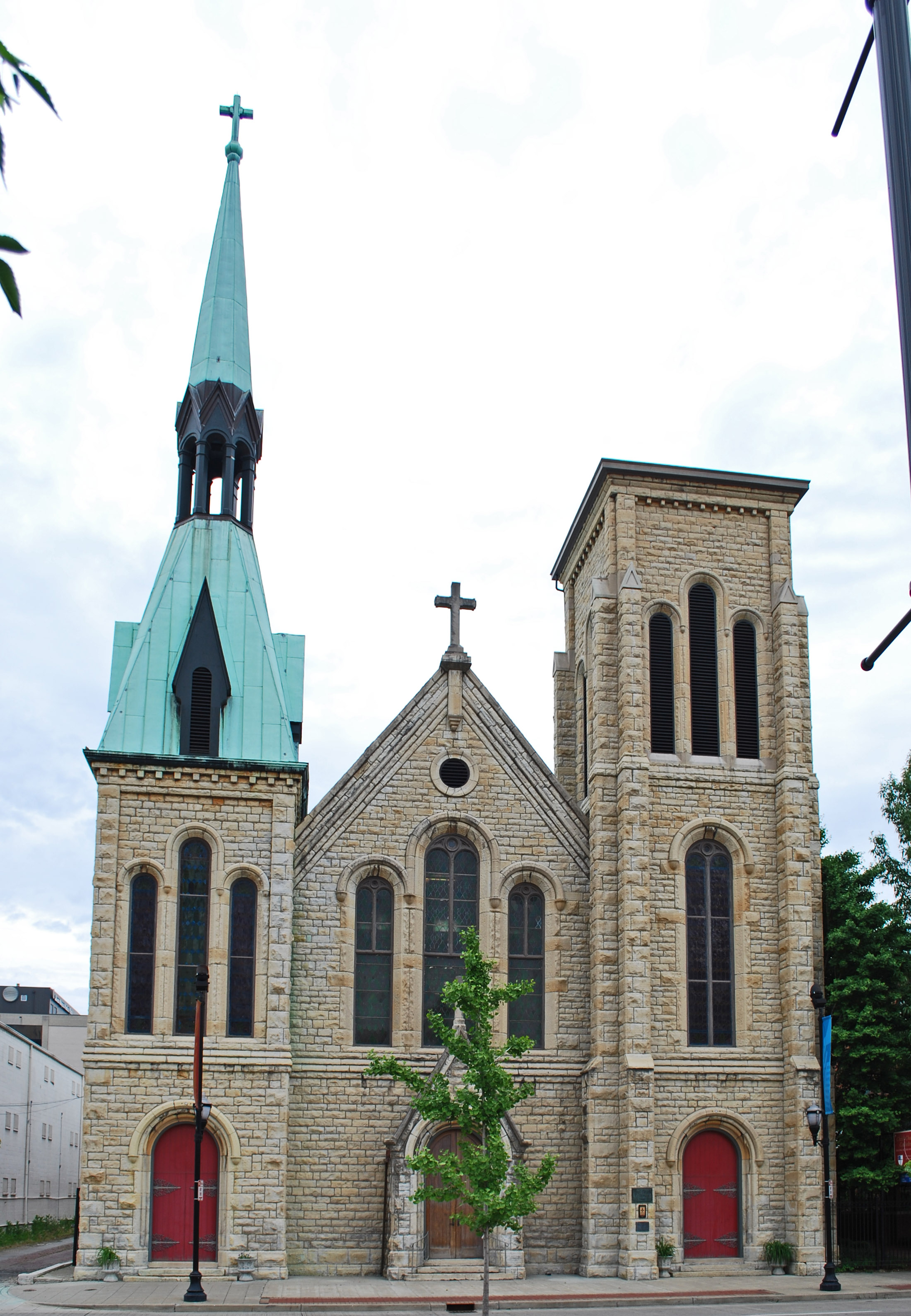
Christ Church Cathedral, Louisville

The Episcopal Diocese of Kentucky is a diocese of the Episcopal Church in the United States of America, encompassing the western half of the state of Kentucky. In 2024, the diocese reported average Sunday attendance (ASA) of 1,874 persons, down from 3,061 in 2015. Reported membership declined from 8,175 in 2015 to 6,409 in 2023. No membership statistics were reported in 2024 national parochial reports. The 32 reporting congregations of the diocese had $7,367,528 in plate and pledge income in 2024.

== History ==
The first verifiable religious services in Kentucky were held on May 28, 1775, under an elm tree at Boonesboro by the Rev. John Lythe. After the American Revolutionary War, in 1795, an Episcopal chaplain offered prayers at the beginning of the new state's first legislative session, and while one diocesan historian (the diocese originally comprised all of Kentucky) estimated that half of all early emigrants were Episcopalian, the church did not follow them for decades. Between 1803 and 1806, the Rev. Williams Kavanagh, formerly a Methodist deacon but ordained by Bishop Thomas John Claggett of Maryland, held services in a log building at Louisville used by various Protestant faiths, before he moved to Henderson. Instead, revival meetings dominated, but in 1822 some organized themselves into Christ Church, Louisville. Between 1824 and 1829, the state only had one clergyman, Dr. Chapman in Lexington.

The diocese of Kentucky was organized in 1829, 37 years after Kentucky became a state. The following year, Benjamin Bosworth Smith arrived to become rector at Lexington's Christ Church, although he had previously declined the position. In 1832, he became the new diocese's first bishop. However, at the time, the entire state only had three parishes: Louisville, Lexington and Danville. Nonetheless, Bishop Smith served until 1884, and as a result of his longevity became the ninth presiding bishop in 1868, after which time he was permanently resident in New York (though he had been partly resident there since 1866), episcopal duties in the Diocese of Kentucky being allocated to an assistant bishop. However, the diocese was the subject of a schism related to a new prayerbook, with adherents of the older Protestant practices withdrawing under assistant bishop George David Cummins.

During the episcopate of the second bishop, Thomas Underwood Dudley, the diocese was divided to form the Diocese of Kentucky covering the western half of the state and the Diocese of Lexington covering the eastern half. The establishment of the new diocese took effect in 1895, when Dudley, who continued as Bishop of Kentucky, took Christ Church Cathedral in Louisville as the episcopal seat.

In spite of its history of nearly 200 years, the Diocese has had only eight diocesan bishops, including Smith's long episcopate of 52 years, which is thought to be the longest single episcopate in Anglican history. A majority of the members live in the Louisville area, with the remainder scattered throughout southern and western Kentucky, primarily in communities with more than 10,000 residents.

The Episcopal Theological Seminary in Kentucky, the fourth seminary of the Episcopal Church, was established in 1834. Among the diocese's other major institutions, All Saints Retreat and Conference Center was founded in 1957 on Rough River Lake in Grayson County.

Edwin F. (Ted) Gulick Jr., was consecrated and installed as 7th Bishop of Kentucky on April 17, 1994. In October 2008, Gulick announced his retirement plans and called for the election of his successor. On June 5, 2010, Terry Allen White, Dean of Grace and Holy Trinity Cathedral in Kansas City, Missouri, in the Diocese of West Missouri, was elected on the second ballot. His consecration as the 8th Bishop of Kentucky occurred on September 25, 2010. He was seated at Christ Church Cathedral on September 26, 2010.

== Bishops of Kentucky ==
	Honorific & Name	Dates
1st	Benjamin Bosworth Smith	1832–1884 (Presiding Bishop 1868–1884)
2nd	Thomas Underwood Dudley	1884–1904 (Coadjutor Bishop, 1875–1884)
3rd	Charles E. Woodcock	1905–1935
4th	Charles Clingman	1936–1954
5th	Charles G. Marmion	1954–1974
6th	David Benson Reed	1974–1994 (Coadjutor Bishop, 1972–1974)
7th	Edwin F. Gulick Jr.	1994–2010
8th	Terry A. White	2010–present

== Suffragan and Assisting Bishops ==
- George David Cummins, Assistant Bishop, 1866–1873

== See also ==
- Historical list of bishops of the Episcopal Church in the United States of America
- Religion in Louisville, Kentucky
