= St. Mark's Cathedral (Shreveport, Louisiana) =

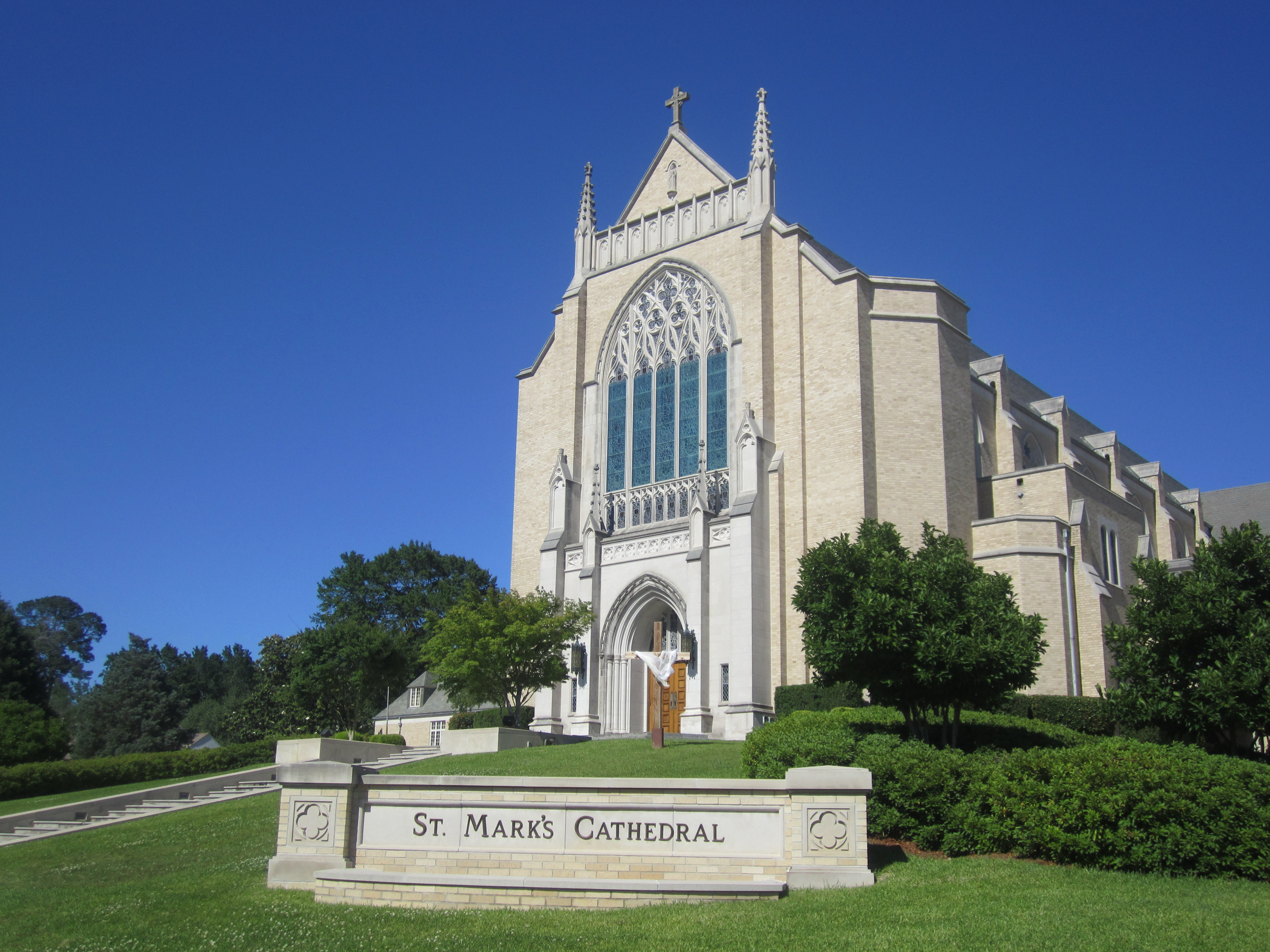

- Location within Louisiana
- 32°28′58.17″N 93°44′57.9″W
- Location: 908 Rutherford St. Shreveport, Louisiana
- Country: United States
- Denomination: Episcopal Church in the United States of America
- Website: stmarkscathedral.net

History
- Founded: March 1839

Architecture
- Style: Gothic Revival
- Completed: 1954

Administration
- Diocese: Diocese of Western Louisiana

Clergy
- Bishop: The Right Rev. Jacob W. Owensby
- Dean: The Very Rev. Alston B. Johnson

St. Mark's Cathedral is an Episcopal cathedral in Shreveport, Louisiana, United States. It is the seat of the Diocese of Western Louisiana. The first services of the Episcopal church in Shreveport were celebrated by the Rt. Rev. Leonidas Polk, the Bishop of Louisiana in March 1839. That liturgy is considered the founding day of St. Mark's Church. The parish church was located on the corner of Cotton Street and Texas Avenue since 1905. It is now the Church of the Holy Cross. Prior to that building, the church was located on Fannin Street. The present church at Fairfield Avenue and Rutherford Street was completed in 1954. It became the diocesan cathedral on July 7, 1990.

Average Sunday Attendance (ASA) reported by the cathedral in 2025 was 311 persons. This was a relative decrease from ASA of 431 persons reported in 2015. In 2025, the church reported 1,807 members

== School ==
A committee of parishioners of St. Mark's Church founded St. Mark's Day School in September 1953, as an early childhood program. The school was moved to its current location on Fairfield Avenue when it was opened in January 1954. Over the years, it has evolved into St. Mark's Cathedral School, with a program extending from three-year-olds through eighth grade.

== See also ==
- List of the Episcopal cathedrals of the United States
- List of cathedrals in the United States
