= Christ Church Cathedral (Louisville, Kentucky) =

- U.S. National Register of Historic Places
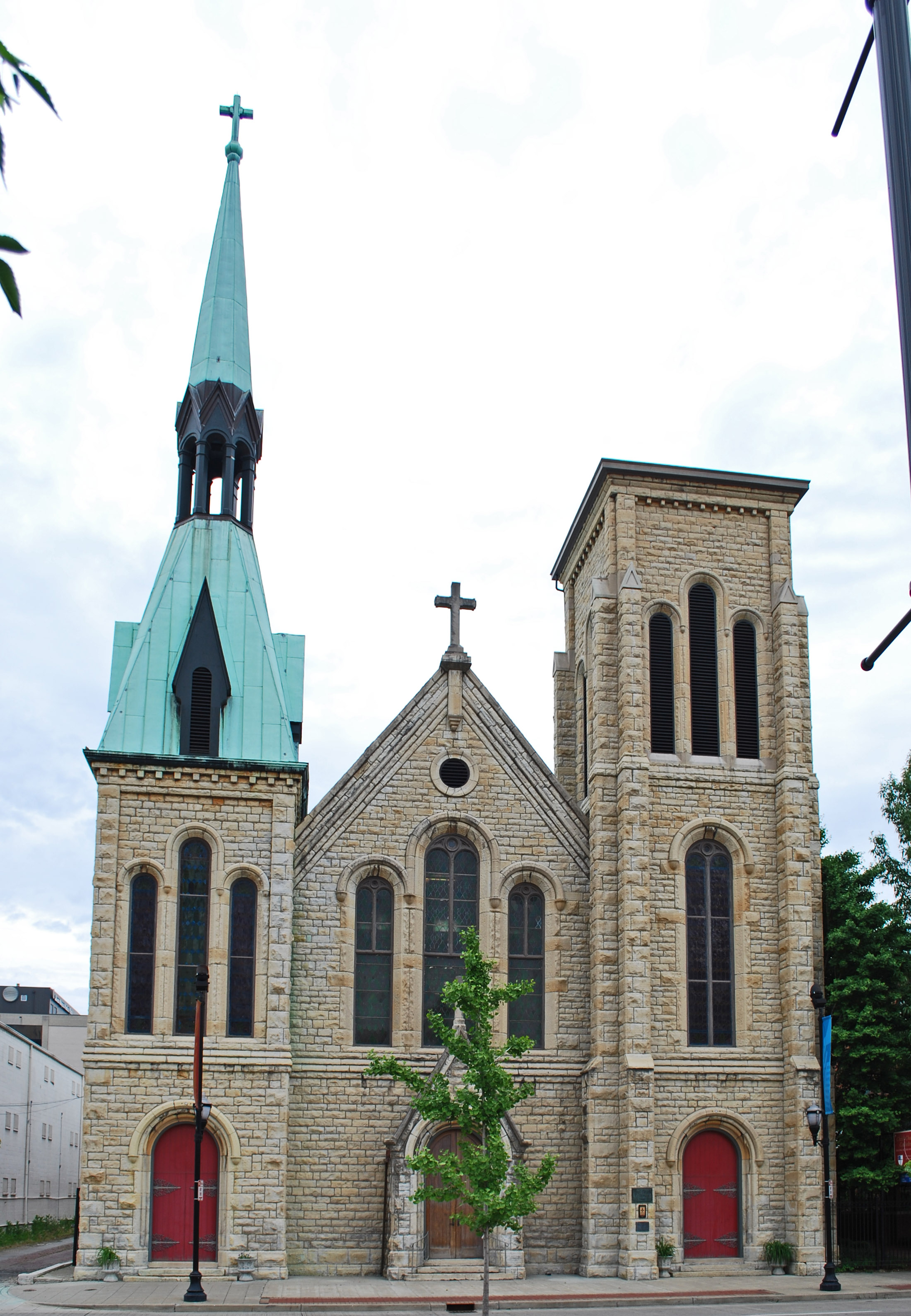

- Location within Kentucky Location within the United States
- Location: 421 S. 2nd St., Louisville, Kentucky
- Coordinates: 38°15′7″N 85°45′13″W
- Area: 0.8 acres (0.32 ha)
- Built: 1824
- Architect: William Henry Redin
- Architectural style: Late Victorian, Federal, Federal Meetinghouse
- NRHP reference No.: 73000807
- Added to NRHP: August 14, 1973

The historic Christ Church Cathedral in Louisville, Kentucky, was founded on May 31, 1822. The original church building was completed in 1824; a new Romanesque Revival facade was added in 1870. The structure was listed on the National Register of Historic Places in 1973.

In 2025, the cathedral reported 243 members. Average Sunday Attendance (ASA) reported by the cathedral in 2025 was 87 persons. This was a relative decrease from ASA of 118 persons reported in 2020.

== History and building ==
Christ Church became the cathedral of the Episcopal Diocese of Kentucky in May 1894.

The original Christ Church building, built in 1824, was "considered a marvel of architectural beauty for its time. Most of it stands as the oldest church building in Louisville. It is presently the principal part of the Nave of the enlarged Christ Church Cathedral."

== See also ==
- List of the Episcopal cathedrals of the United States
- List of cathedrals in the United States
