= Episcopal Diocese of Southwestern Virginia =

Episcopal Church diocese in the US

Coordinates: 37°15′51.4″N 79°56′31.4″W

Diocese of Southwestern Virginia

Location
- Country: United States
- Territory: Counties of Alleghany, Amherst, Augusta, Bath, Bedford, Bland, Botetourt, Buchanan, Campbell, Carroll, Craig, Dickinson, Floyd, Franklin, Giles, Grayson, Henry, Highland, Lee, Montgomery, Nelson, Patrick, Pulaski, Roanoke, Rockbridge, Russell, Scott, Smyth, Tazewell, Washington, Wise, & Wythe.
- Ecclesiastical province: Province III

Statistics
- Congregations: 50 (2025)
- Members: 7,905 (2025)

Information
- Denomination: Episcopal Church
- Established: December 10, 1919

Current leadership
- Bishop: Karin MacPhail

Map
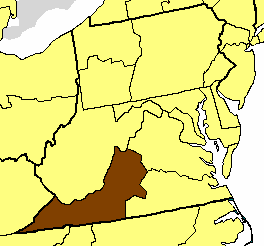
- Location of the Diocese of Southwestern Virginia

Website
- www.dioswva.org

Episcopal Diocese of Southwestern Virginia is the diocese of the Episcopal Church in the United States of America located in the southwest area of Virginia. It is in Province III (for the Middle Atlantic region). The diocese includes parishes in the state's southwestern region, including the cities of Lynchburg and Roanoke.

The diocese reported 10,414 members in 2017 and 7,905 members in 2025. Plate and pledge income for the 50 filing congregations of the diocese in 2025 was $11,192,540. Average Sunday attendance (ASA) in 2025 was 2,882 persons. This was a relative decline from ASA of 3,956 in 2015.

The Diocese of Southwestern Virginia was created as a split from the Diocese of Southern Virginia in 1919. Although there has been an Anglican presence in southwestern Virginia since the mid-18th century, the Diocese of Southern Virginia had been formed in 1892 from the Diocese of Virginia covering most counties in the historic Commonwealth, and by the end of World War I with more than 260 congregations was the third largest diocese in the nation. Upon creation of the Diocese of Southwestern Virginia, Roanoke was named see city of the first Bishop, Robert Carter Jett, and its St. John's Church housed the diocesan offices until shortly after World War II, when Evans House was built.

On January 31, 2026, the diocese elected the Rev. Karin MacPhail as seventh bishop. Her consecration took place on June 13, 2026.
