= Geralyn Wolf =

American bishop (born 1947)

The Right Reverend Geralyn Wolf
- Bishop of Rhode Island
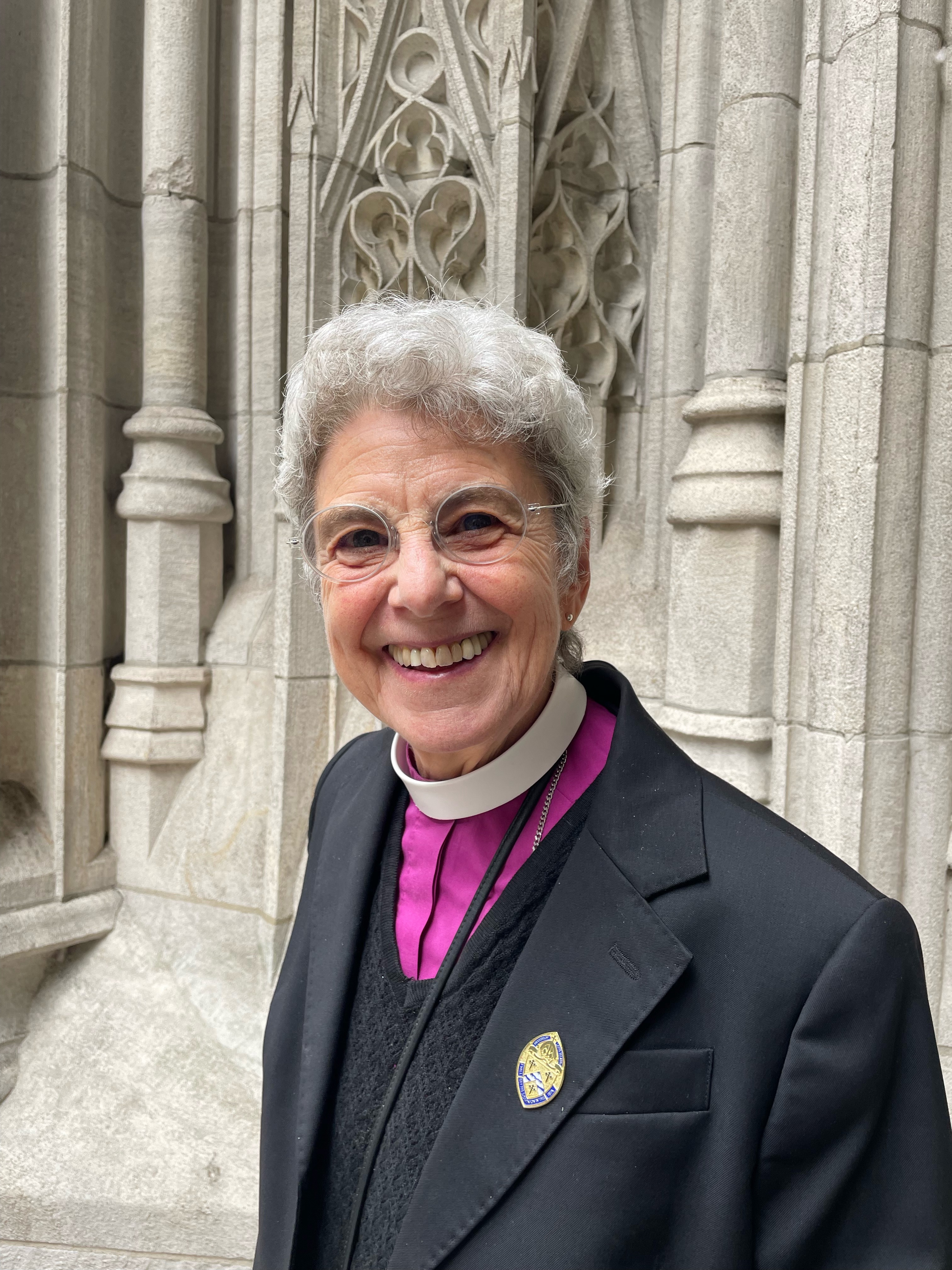
- Province: Episcopal Church
- Diocese: Rhode Island
- Elected: September 30, 1995
- In office: 1996–2012
- Predecessor: George Nelson Hunt III
- Successor: Nicholas Knisely
- Other post: Assistant Bishop of Long Island

Orders
- Ordination: 1978 by Lyman Ogilby
- Consecration: February 17, 1996 by Edmond L. Browning

Personal details
- Born: April 30, 1947 (age 79) Brooklyn, New York, US
- Denomination: Anglican
- Spouse: Thomas Charles Bair Jr.
- Education: West Chester University

Geralyn Wolf (born April 30, 1947) is an American bishop who was the twelfth diocesan bishop of the Diocese of Rhode Island in the Episcopal Church. Wolf was consecrated as bishop on February 17, 1996.

== Early life and education ==
Wolf born in Brooklyn, New York, and was raised Jewish before becoming a Christian around 1971. She graduated from West Chester University in 1968 with a Bachelor of Science degree. She also holds a Master of Arts degree in education from Trenton State College, which she received in 1971. At Episcopal Divinity School in 1977 she earned a Master of Divinity degree.

== Career ==
Wolf was ordained to the diaconate in 1977, and the priesthood in 1978, in the Episcopal Diocese of Pennsylvania.

Prior to her election she was, from 1986 to 1995, Dean of Christ Church Cathedral in Louisville, Kentucky, the first woman dean of a cathedral. David Reed (bishop), Bishop of Kentucky, had named Wolf to replace Rev. Allen L. Bartlett Jr., who was elected bishop coadjutor of the Diocese of Pennsylvania in September 1985.

Wolf serves on several national committees and is the liturgist for the House of Bishops. She is an associate of the Society of St. Margaret, a companion of the Oratory of the Good Shepherd, an ecumenical oblate of Mount Saviour Monastery in Elmira, New York, and has visited and worked with the Taizé community in France. She is the author of several published anthems and articles and creates whimsical figures that are made out of wood.

Wolf falls on the mainstream to progressive side of Episcopal Church politics and in 2003 supported the consecration of gay bishop Gene Robinson. However, she defrocked the Episcopal priest Ann Holmes Redding on account of Redding's choice to embrace the Islamic faith while claiming to remain Christian. In addition, Wolf opposes same-sex marriage and has proposed eliminating the word "marriage" from civil law and replacing it with "civil unions."

== Personal life ==
In 2007 Wolf married Thomas Charles Bair Jr. She retired as Bishop of Rhode Island in 2012.

== See also ==
- List of Episcopal bishops of the United States
- Historical list of the Episcopal bishops of the United States

Episcopal Church (USA) titles
Preceded by George Nelson Hunt, III	12th Bishop of Rhode Island; 17 February 1996 – November 2012	Succeeded by W. Nicholas Knisely Jr.
