= Ozi William Whitaker =

American bishop (1830–1911)

The Right Reverend Ozi William Whitaker D.D.
- Bishop of Pennsylvania
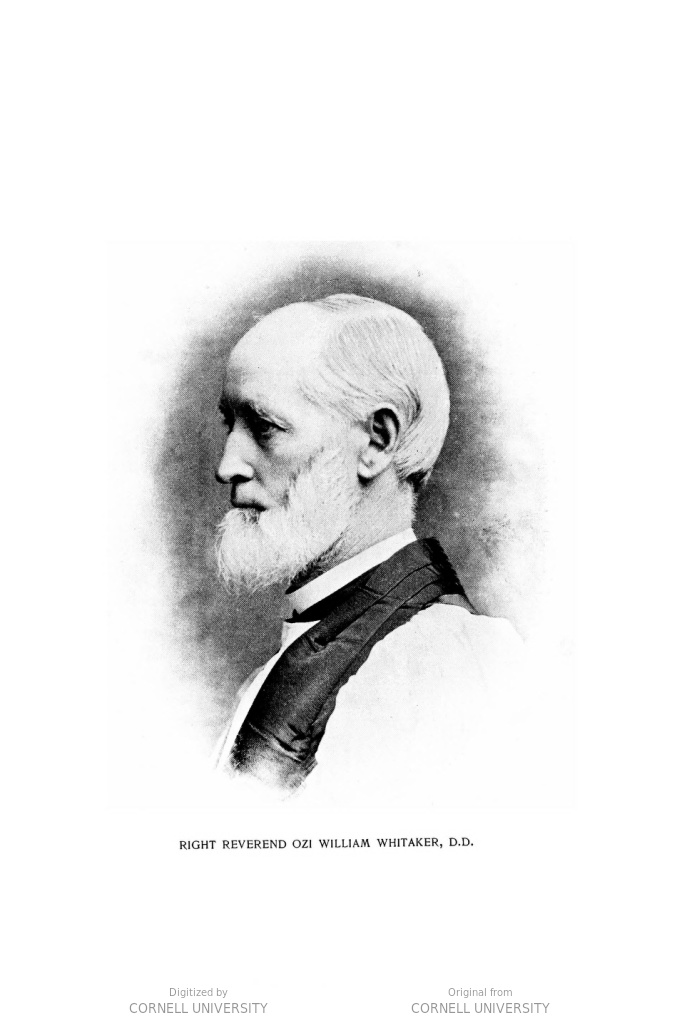
- Church: Episcopal Church
- Diocese: Pennsylvania
- Elected: 1886
- In office: 1887–1911
- Predecessor: William B. Stevens
- Successor: Alexander Mackay-Smith
- Previous posts: Missionary Bishop of Nevada and Arizona (1869-1886); Coadjutor Bishop of Pennsylvania (1886-1887)

Orders
- Ordination: August 7, 1863 by Manton Eastburn
- Consecration: October 13, 1869 by Charles Pettit McIlvaine

Personal details
- Born: May 10, 1830 Salem, Massachusetts, United States
- Died: February 9, 1911 (aged 80) Philadelphia, Pennsylvania, United States
- Denomination: Anglican
- Parents: Ira Whitaker & Chloe Wood
- Spouse: Julian Chester

Ozi William Whitaker (May 10, 1830 – February 9, 1911) was a leading evangelical in the Episcopal Church who became missionary bishop of Nevada and Arizona, then coadjutor and eventually the 5th diocesan bishop of the Episcopal Diocese of Pennsylvania.

== Early life and education ==
Born in Salem, Massachusetts, he attended Shelburne Falls and Brattleboro Academies in 1851–52, then taught New Salem Academy in 1853. He attended Middlebury College and after graduating in 1856 attended the General Theological Seminary and married. He received a doctorate of Divinity from Kenyon College in 1869, and an honorary doctor of law degree from the University of Pennsylvania in 1898.

== Career ==
Whitaker was ordained to the diaconate on July 15, 1863, and as an Episcopal priest on August 7, 1863. He was elected the first rector of St. Paul's Church in Englewood, New Jersey in 1865. He technically remained there until March, 1867, although active as a missionary in the surrounding countryside.

In 1863, Whitaker founded a small Episcopal congregation in Dayton, then in the Nevada Territory, a year after his wife helped found a Sunday School in Virginia City, Nevada. During a visit to his sister in 1865, he helped food He became missionary bishop of Nevada and Arizona succeeding Joseph Cruikshank Talbot in 1869 (Nevada did not receive separate diocesan status until 1971). During Bishop Charles McIlvaine of Ohio, bishop Alfred Lee of Delaware and bishop Manton Eastburn of Massachusetts consecrated him on October 13, 1869. For many years, Bishop Whitaker made St. Paul's the Prospector Episcopal Church in Virginia City his base, and even rebuilt it after a disastrous fire in 1875. Rt.Rev. Whitaker also established in 1874 the Chapel of the Good Shepherd, a missionary church for Asian railroad workers in Carson City and the following year a chapel for Chinese workers in Virginia City (which was destroyed by a citywide fire a few months later in October 1875). Growing anti-Chinese feeling also prompted its prime mover, Ah Foo, to become a missionary in China. Bishop Whitaker also established a mission to the Paiute tribe, St. James Mission in Wadsworth.

Bishop Whitaker personally founded Trinity Church Mission in Reno in 1873, which somehow barely escaped the fire which destroyed much of the city in 1878. After securing a land grant from the Central Pacific Railroad, in 1879 he established Bishop Whitaker's School for Girls, a school for girls (both day and boarding) overlooking the Truckee River in Reno. However, in 1886 the University of Nevada established a free school nearby and its founder moved to Philadelphia, so the Episcopal school closed in 1894.

Bishop Whitaker initially translated to the Diocese of Pennsylvania to serve as coadjutor to bishop William B. Stevens, and stopped overseeing the Nevada diocese in 1888, after the General Convention transferred oversight to bishop Abiel Leonard of Salt Lake City and a year after Bishop Whitaker succeeded Bishop Stevens as diocesan bishop of Pennsylvania. He served as the diocese's fifth bishop from 1887 to 1911. From 1904 until his death, he also led the Pennsylvania Bible Society as its 10th president (Pennsylvania's first bishop, William White, had founded the society). Beginning in 1902, his eventual successor, Alexander Mackay-Smith served as his coadjutor.

== Death and legacy ==
The elderly bishop died in Philadelphia after contracting influenza, and the funeral was held at the Church of Our Savior. Although the Episcopal school Whitaker founded in Reno closed in 1894 and its buildings were used first by the University of Nevada and later as a hospital, the site is now a park named after its founding missionary bishop. The University of Arizona has some of his papers, as do Yale and the University of Michigan in their Protestant Episcopal bishops collections.

Episcopal Church (USA) titles
Preceded by William B. Stevens	5th Bishop of Pennsylvania coadjutor, 1886-1887; 1887-1911	Succeeded by Alexander Mackay-Smith
