= Anne Holmes =

Anne or Ann Holmes may refer to:

- Anne Holmes; see List of As the World Turns characters
- Ann Holmes Redding (born 1952), former Episcopal priest, defrocked for converting to Islam
- Ann Holmes, lesbian minister; see Lesbian American history
- Ann Doherty (born Ann Holmes), English novelist and playwright
