= William Bacon Stevens =

American bishop

The Right Reverend William Bacon Stevens D.D., LL.D.
- Bishop of Pennsylvania
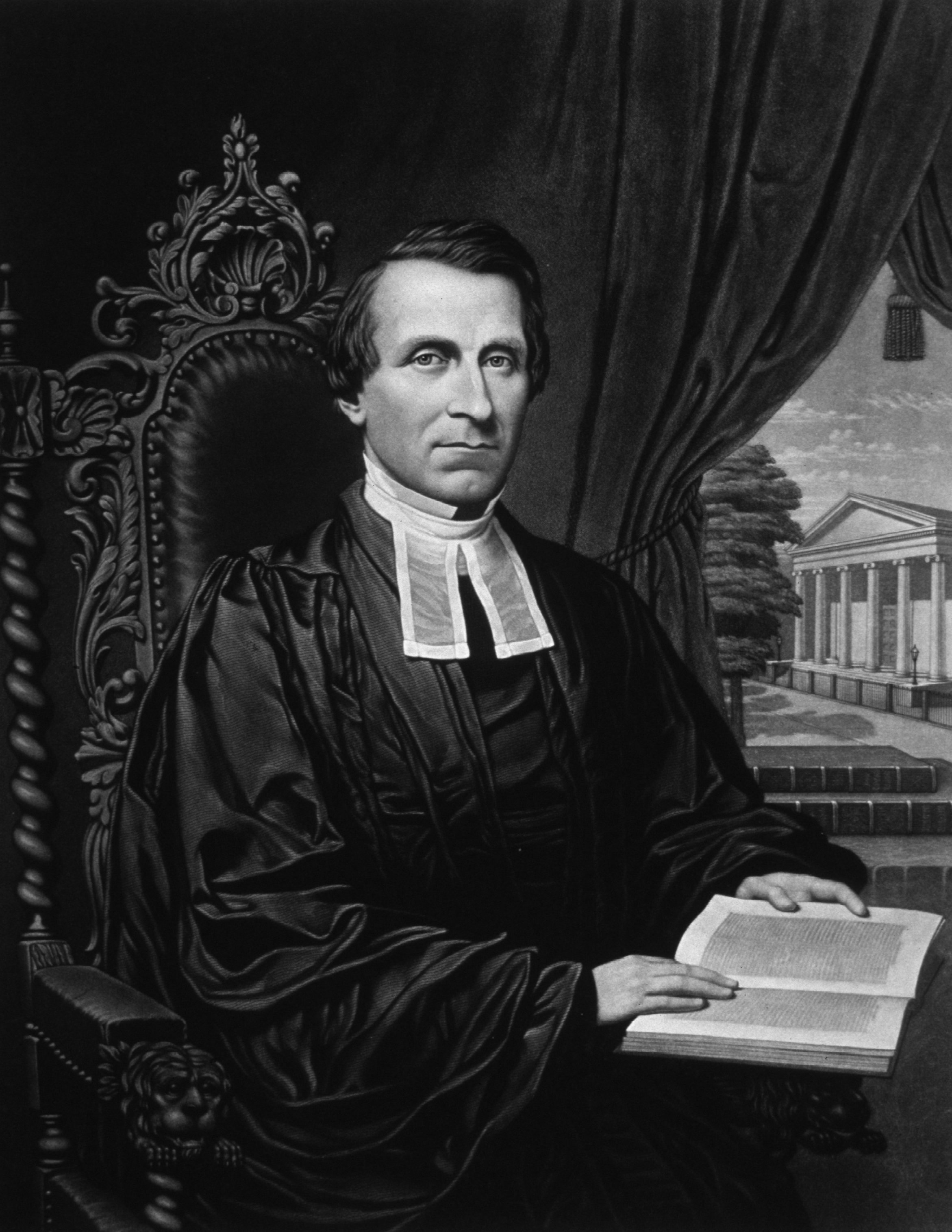
- Church: Episcopal Church
- Diocese: Pennsylvania
- In office: 1865–1887
- Predecessor: Alonzo Potter
- Successor: Ozi William Whitaker
- Previous post: Assistant Bishop of Pennsylvania (1862-1865)

Orders
- Ordination: January 7, 1844 by Stephen Elliott
- Consecration: January 2, 1862 by John Henry Hopkins

Personal details
- Born: July 13, 1815 Bath, Maine, U.S.
- Died: June 11, 1887 (aged 71) Philadelphia, Pennsylvania, U.S.
- Buried: Church of St. James the Less
- Denomination: Anglican
- Parents: William Stevens & Rebecca Bacon
- Spouse: Alethea Coppee Stevens; Anna Maria Conyngham
- Signature: William Bacon Stevens's signature

William Bacon Stevens (July 13, 1815 – June 11, 1887) was the fourth Bishop of the Episcopal Diocese of Pennsylvania.

== Early life and education ==
William Bacon Stevens was born in Bath, Maine on July 13, 1815. He was educated at Phillips Academy, Andover and later studied medicine at Dartmouth College and the Medical College of South Carolina.

== Career ==
After practicing medicine in Savannah, Georgia, for five years, he served as state historian of Georgia and at that time he began to study for the priesthood of the Episcopal Church.

He was ordained deacon on February 28, 1843, and later to the priesthood on January 7, 1844. He briefly served as professor of moral philosophy at the University of Georgia prior to being called as the rector of St. Andrew's Church of Philadelphia, Pennsylvania, in 1848. He received the Doctor of Divinity degree from the University of Pennsylvania and was later elected assistant bishop of the Diocese of Pennsylvania.

He was elected as a member of the American Philosophical Society in 1854.

He was consecrated on January 2, 1862, at St. Andrew's Church. Upon the death of Alonzo Potter in 1865, he became Bishop of Pennsylvania. He served in that office and as bishop of the American Episcopal churches in Europe until his death.

== Death ==
He died in Philadelphia, on June 11, 1887, at age 71.

== Works ==
- The Parables of the New Testament Practically Unfolded

Episcopal Church (USA) titles
Preceded by Alonzo Potter	4th Bishop of Pennsylvania coadjutor, 1862-1865; 1865-1887	Succeeded by Ozi William Whitaker
