= Franklin Turner =

Franklin Turner may refer to:

- Franklin D. Turner (1933–2013), American prelate of the Episcopal Church
- Franklin P. Turner (1827–1889), American lawyer and delegate to the Virginia Secession Convention of 1861
