= Lyman Ogilby =

American bishop and priest (1922–1990)

The Right Reverend Lyman Ogilby D.D
- Bishop of Pennsylvania
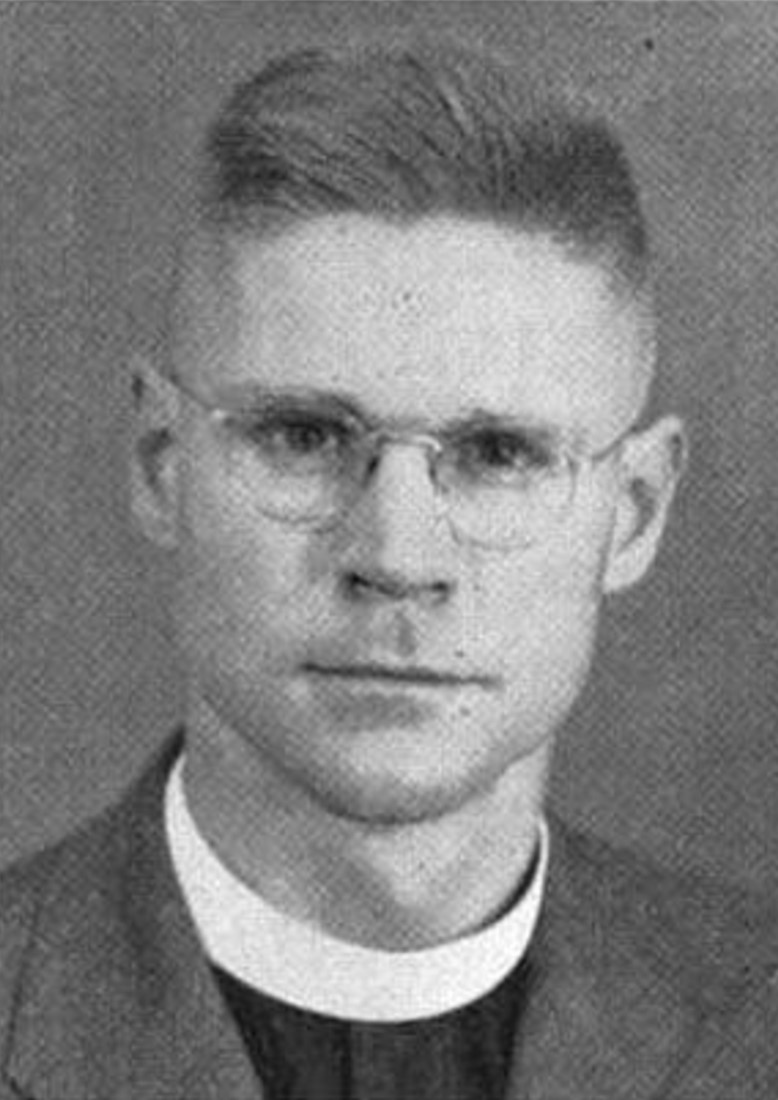
- Church: Episcopal Church
- Diocese: Pennsylvania
- In office: 1974–1987
- Predecessor: Robert L. DeWitt
- Successor: Allen L. Bartlett
- Previous posts: Suffragan Bishop of the Philippines (1953-1957); Bishop of the Philippines (1957-1967); Coadjutor Bishop of South Dakota (1967–1970); Assistant Bishop of Pennsylvania (1971-1973); Coadjutor Bishop of Pennsylvania (1973-1974)

Orders
- Ordination: 1950 by Norman S. Binsted
- Consecration: February 2, 1953 by Norman S. Binsted

Personal details
- Born: January 25, 1922 Hartford, Connecticut, United States
- Died: November 3, 1990 (aged 68) Spokane, Washington, United States
- Denomination: Anglican
- Spouse: Ruth Ogilby
- Children: 3
- Education: Hamilton College

Lyman Cunningham Ogilby (January 25, 1922 – November 3, 1990) was an Episcopal priest who became a missionary bishop in the Philippines (then a U.S. territory), coadjutor bishop in the Episcopal Diocese of South Dakota and later the Episcopal Diocese of Pennsylvania, where he succeeded Bishop Robert L. DeWitt and became the 13th diocesan bishop until his retirement.

== Early life and education ==
Ogilby was born in Hartford, Connecticut and received an undergraduate degree from Hamilton College. He then served in the U.S. Navy during World War II, mostly in the Pacific theater. After discharge, he attended Episcopal Theological School in Cambridge, Massachusetts, graduating in 1949.

== Career ==
Upon being ordained a deacon in 1949 and priest in 1950, Ogilby's ministry began at the Brent School in the Philippines, where he served as chaplain as well as teacher. Two years later, he was elected suffragan bishop, and was consecrated in 1953 by the Philippines' missionary bishop Norman S. Binsted and suffragan Robert F. Wilner, as well as by bishop Walter H. Gray of Connecticut. Ogilby became the territory's bishop in 1957, but resigned in 1967 to let Benito Cabanban (a Filipino whom he had helped consecrate as his suffragan in 1959) become the diocesan bishop. While bishop of the Philippines, Ogilby also served as secretary of the Council of the Anglican Church of Southeast Asia (1960 to 1968), founded Trinity College in Quezon City, Philippines, and held other regional posts.

Upon returning to the mainland, Ogilby became a bishop in the Episcopal Diocese of South Dakota for three years, but again resigned to let a priest born in the diocese take that leadership position.

He moved to Philadelphia to become coadjutor to bishop Robert L. DeWitt, and succeeded him as bishop. During Bishop Ogilby's first year, then-retired bishop DeWitt and others consecrated eleven women as priests, the Philadelphia 11, which caused significant controversy in Philadelphia and within the denomination. Ultimately, Ogilby became reconciled to the idea of women becoming priests. He ordained Philadelphia native Barbara C. Harris (who had participated in that service as an acolyte), as a deacon in 1979 and a priest in 1980, and later participated in her (again controversial) consecration as bishop suffragan in the Episcopal Diocese of Massachusetts whereby she became the first woman consecrated as a bishop in the Anglican Communion. The first parish in the diocese to call a woman as rector (the Rev. Michaela Keener) also occurred during his episcopate (St. Giles parish in Upper Darby in 1986).

== Death and legacy ==
Bishop Ogilby's episcopate continued after his somewhat early retirement, despite ongoing health issues. He assisted in the dioceses of Western Michigan, Bethlehem (Pennsylvania), Maryland, and Washington (D.C.). He died of a heart condition in Spokane, Washington, where he had gone to assist in a consecration. He was survived by his wife, two sons and a daughter.

== Bibliography ==
- contributor, Viewpoints: Some Aspects of Anglican Thinking (Greenwich: Seabury Press, 1959)
- Bishop's Address (1974)
- Bishop's Sermon: Wild Boar, Mosquitoes, and the Mission of the Redeemed Deceivers (1978)
- The Bishop's Visitation (1985) liturgical customary

Episcopal Church (USA) titles
Preceded by Robert L. DeWitt	13th Bishop of Pennsylvania coadjutor, 1973; 1974-1987	Succeeded by Allen L. Bartlett
