= Church of St. Andrew and St. Monica =

Episcopalian church in Philadelphia

Church of St. Andrew & St. Monica
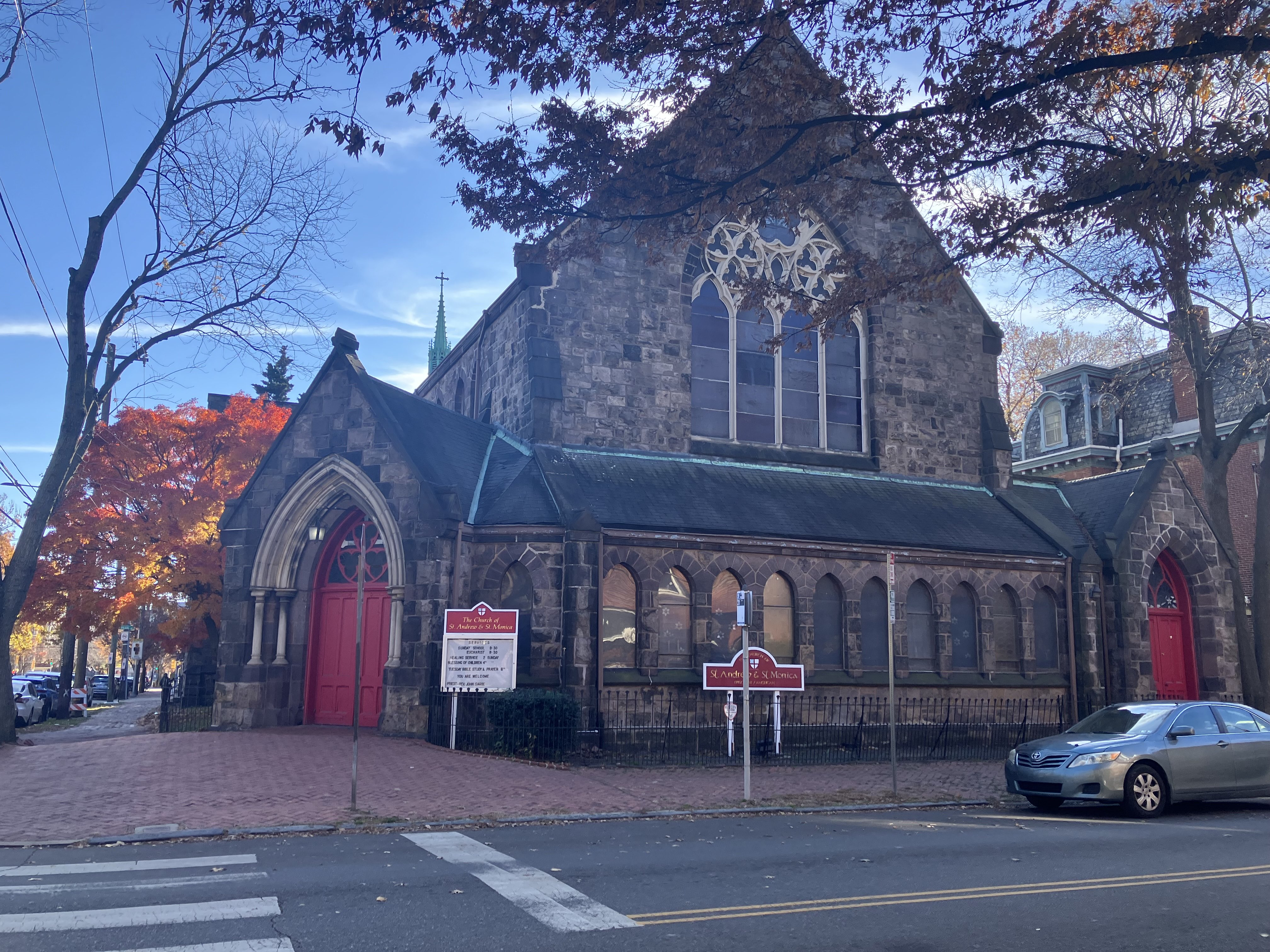
- Front of church in 2025

- Location of the Church of St. Andrew & St. Monica in Pennsylvania
- 39.960541°N 75.194019°W
- Location: Powelton Village, Philadelphia
- Address: 3600 Baring St
- Country: United States
- Denomination: Episcopalian
- Website: ssandrewmonica.org

History
- Founded: July 8, 1866
- Consecrated: June 3, 1917

Architecture
- Style: Gothic revival
- Groundbreaking: October 1865
- Completed: 1883

Administration
- Province: Province III
- Diocese: Episcopal Diocese of Pennsylvania

Clergy
- Bishop: Daniel G. P. Gutierrez
- Rector: Reverend John Sagoe

The Church of St. Andrew & St. Monica (originally St. Andrew's Protestant Episcopalian Church) is an Episcopal church located in Powelton Village, Philadelphia in the United States. It is part of the Powelton Village Historic District within West Philadelphia. It is built with rough stone and schist, and has trimmings of limestone and brownstone. The church reported 184 members in 2021 and 131 members in 2023; no membership statistics were reported in 2024 parochial reports. Plate and pledge income reported for the congregation in 2024 was $188,062. Average Sunday attendance (ASA) in 2024 was 43 persons.

== History ==
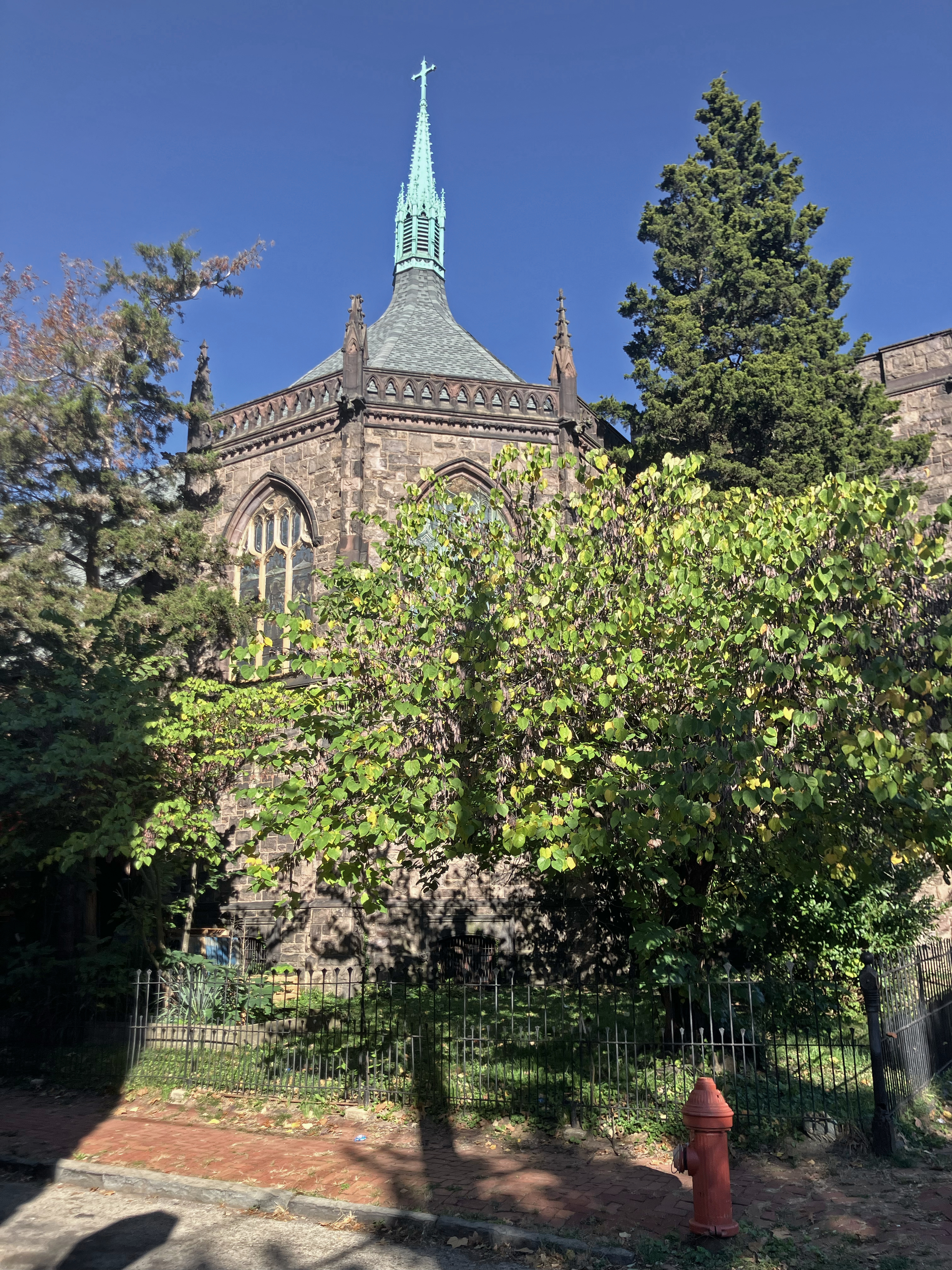
Spire of the church, as shown from the rear

The congregation, which has its origins in the St. Mark congregation in the early 19th century, was founded in October 1865, where a cornerstone was laid on the intersection of 36th and Baring St. The first service was held on July 8, 1866. The congregation eventually outgrew the church, leading to efforts starting in the 1880s to expand the church. A new design in Gothic Revival style was chosen, which began construction in Fall 1883. The design was created by Wilson Brothers & Company architectural firm, and was constructed by Charles D. Supplee & Son.

In 1897, it was partially rebuilt and refinished after a fire. It was consecrated on June 3, 1917. In 1963, it was added to the Philadelphia Register of Historic Places. It merged with the Church of St. Monica to become its current form in 1966.

=== Rectors ===
- The Rev. George W. Natt (December 1850 – January 1860)
- The Rev. William Henry Nassau Stewart (January 1860 – January 1863)
- The Rev. Samuel E. Smith (May 1863 – May 6, 1873)
- The Rev. Robert Bethell Claxton (December 17, 1873 – May 24, 1882)
- The Rev. Charles Duane (October 1882 – 1890)
- The Rev. William Herbert Assheton (September 1890 – 1891)
- The Rev. Charles M. Armstrong (1891 – ?)

...

- The Rev. Charles K. C. Lawrence (fl. 1954)

...

- The Rev. Matthew W. Davis (fl. December 1966 – April 1971)
- The Rev. William G. Johnson (fl. December 1971 – April 1977)

...

- Samuel Adu-Andoh (fl. 2005 – 2015)
- Rev. John Sagoe (March 2025 – present)
