= Philip M. Rhinelander =

American bishop

The Right Reverend Philip Mercer Rhinelander D.D., LL.D., D.C.L.
- Bishop of Pennsylvania
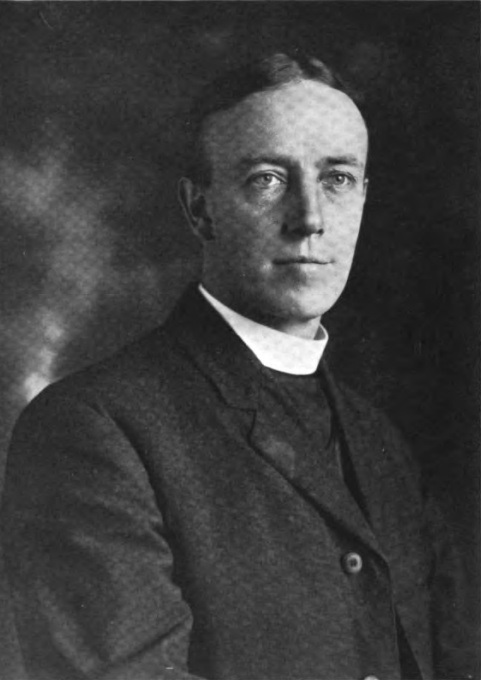
- Church: Episcopal Church
- Diocese: Pennsylvania
- Elected: May 10, 1911
- In office: 1911–1923
- Predecessor: Alexander Mackay-Smith
- Successor: Thomas J. Garland
- Previous post: Coadjutor Bishop of Pennsylvania (1911)

Orders
- Ordination: December 19, 1897 by Henry Y. Satterlee
- Consecration: October 28, 1911 by Daniel S. Tuttle

Personal details
- Born: June 13, 1869 Newport, Rhode Island, United States
- Died: September 21, 1939 (aged 70) Gloucester, Massachusetts, United States
- Buried: Island Cemetery
- Denomination: Anglican
- Parents: Frederic W. Rhinelander; Frances Davenport Skinner
- Spouse: Helen Maria Hamilton (m. 1905)
- Children: 3
- Education: St. Paul's School
- Alma mater: Harvard University; Oxford University

Philip Mercer Rhinelander (June 6, 1869 – September 21, 1939) was Bishop of the Episcopal Diocese of Pennsylvania from 1911 to 1923. He graduated from Harvard University in 1891.

== Early life ==
Rhinelander was born in 1869. He was the youngest of eight children born to Frances Davenport (née Skinner) Rhinelander (1828–1899) and Frederic W. Rhinelander (1828–1904), the president of Metropolitan Museum of Art. Frederic William Rhinelander (1859–1942), His older brother, Frederic W. Rhinelander Jr., was married to Constance Satterlee, a daughter of Bishop Henry Y. Satterlee. Through his sister Ethel, he was the uncle of Frederic Rhinelander King, a prominent architect with the firm of Wyeth and King.

His paternal grandparents were Frederic William Rhinelander and Mary Lucretia "Lucy Ann" (née Stevens) Rhinelander. His maternal grandparents were the Rev. Thomas Harvey Skinner and Frances Louisa (née Davenport) Skinner. Through his maternal aunt, Lucretia Stevens Rhinelander, the wife of George Frederic Jones, he was a first cousin of novelist and decorator Edith (née Jones) Wharton and Frederic Rhinelander Jones. Through aunt Mary Elizabeth Rhinelander, the wife of Thomas Haines Newbold, he was a first cousin of New York State Senator Thomas Newbold.

Rhinelander was educated at St. Paul's School in Concord, New Hampshire, before graduating from Harvard University with an A.B. degree in 1891, from Oxford with another A.B. degree in 1896, and from Oxford again with an M.A. degree in 1900.

== Career ==
After he finished at Oxford, he was ordained a deacon at Calvary Church in 1896, in New York City, by his older brother's father-in-law, Bishop Satterlee, the first Bishop of Washington who had been his rector in New York. He followed Satterlee to Washington where he worked under him at St. Mark's Church, a parish and mission for seven years. In 1903, due to health issues, he ended parish work and became a professor of pastoral studies at the Berkeley Divinity School in Middletown, Connecticut. He was at the School for four years, during which time he was married, and then in 1907, became the new chair of the History of Religion and Missions at the Episcopal Theological School, then in Cambridge, Massachusetts. In 1909, he was offered the vicarship of Trinity Church in Manhattan, "one of the most important of the ten houses of worship then conducted by Trinity parish, New York" but declined.

On May 10, 1911, he was elected Bishop Coadjutor of Pennsylvania, and later, succeeded the Rt. Rev. Alexander Mackay-Smith as the 7th Bishop of Pennsylvania. Rhinelander served in this role until May 1, 1923, when he resigned due to poor health. He was succeeded by Thomas J. Garland in a 1924 election.

Along with Bishop James E. Freeman, he was instrumental in the creation of the Washington Cathedral, which he later served as a trustee of and where he was a Warden of the College of Preachers.

== Personal life ==
On May 9, 1905, Rhinelander was married to Helen Maria Hamilton (1870–1956). Helen was the daughter of William Gaston Hamilton and his first wife, Helen Maria (née Pierson) Hamilton. Her paternal grandfather was John Church Hamilton, the fourth son of Alexander Hamilton, the first Treasury Secretary, and his wife, Elizabeth Schuyler Hamilton. Together, they were the parents of:

- Frederic William Rhinelander (b. 1906)
- Philip Hamilton Rhinelander (1908–1987), the head of education at Harvard University and a dean of Stanford University.
- Laurens Hamilton Rhinelander (b. 1909), an attorney and professor of law, who married Louise Merriman Reed in 1937.

Rhinelander died at his summer home, known as Dogmar on Eastern Point in Gloucester, Massachusetts, on September 21, 1939. After his funeral at St. John's Episcopal Church in Gloucester, he was buried at Island Cemetery in Newport.

=== Honors and legacy ===
Bishop Rhinelander received an honorary Doctor of Divinity from the Episcopal Theological School and from Columbia University. He received an honorary Doctor of Laws from the University of Pennsylvania and of Doctor of Civil Law from the Philadelphia Divinity School.

Episcopal Church (USA) titles
| Preceded by Alexander Mackay-Smith | 7th Bishop of Pennsylvania coadjutor, 1911; 1911-1923 | Succeeded by Thomas J. Garland |
