= Thomas J. Garland =

American bishop (1866–1931)

The Right Reverend Thomas James Garland D.D., LL.D., D.C.L.
- Bishop of Pennsylvania
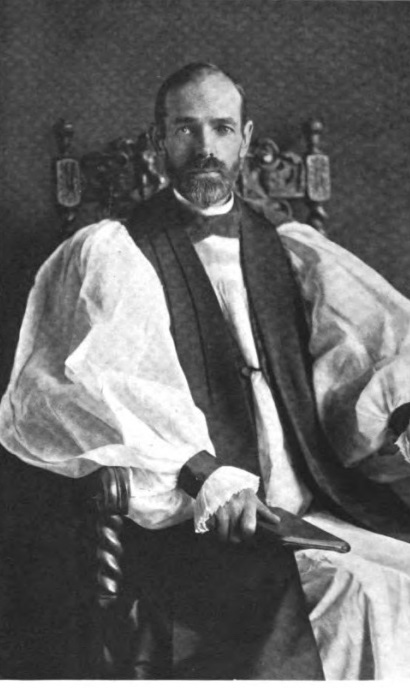
- Church: Episcopal Church
- Diocese: Pennsylvania
- Elected: January 22, 1924
- In office: 1924–1931
- Predecessor: Philip M. Rhinelander
- Successor: Francis M. Taitt
- Previous post: Suffragan Bishop of Pennsylvania (1911-1924)

Orders
- Ordination: June 1892 by Cortlandt Whitehead
- Consecration: October 28, 1911 by Daniel S. Tuttle

Personal details
- Born: October 25, 1866 Belfast, Ireland
- Died: March 1, 1931 (aged 64) Philadelphia, Pennsylvania, United States
- Buried: Church of St. James the Less
- Denomination: Anglican
- Parents: Robert Garland & Eliza Jane Atwell
- Spouse: Elizabeth McKibbin

Thomas James Garland (October 25, 1866 – March 1, 1931) was the eighth bishop of the Diocese of Pennsylvania in the Episcopal Church from 1924 to 1931, having previously served as suffragan bishop from his election in 1911.

== Biography ==
Born near Belfast, Ireland, the son of Robert Garland, an English army officer, and his wife, Eliza Jane Atwell. His family moved to Pittsburgh, Pennsylvania, when Garland was still a boy. He was educated privately and at St Bees School, Cumbria, England. After a brief career in the steel industry, he attended Philadelphia Divinity School from where he graduated with a Bachelor of Divinity in 1891, and was ordained deacon for the Diocese of Pittsburgh on June 28, 1891, and priest the following year by Bishop Cortlandt Whitehead. He was awarded a Doctor of Divinity from the University of Pittsburgh in 1911, a Doctor of Civil Law from Philadelphia Divinity School in 1912 and a Doctor of Law from the University of Pennsylvania in 1925.

He spent a brief period as assistant at St Peter's Church in Pittsburgh, after which he became rector of All Saints Church in Johnstown, Pennsylvania, in 1892. In 1894 he became rector of Trinity Church in Coatesville, Pennsylvania, and in 1898 he moved to Lorain, Ohio, to serve as rector of St David's Church. Later he served as rector of St Paul's Church in Bristol, Pennsylvania, in 1900 and then became professor of church history and church training in 1904, a post he retained till 1911.

Garland was elected Suffragan Bishop of Pennsylvania in 1919 and was consecrated on October 28, 1911, by Presiding Bishop Daniel S. Tuttle. He was elected as diocesan bishop on January 4, 1924. He died in office due to pneumonia on March 1, 1931, in Philadelphia. He had been ill since 1930, after he visited Beirut.

Episcopal Church (USA) titles
Preceded by Philip M. Rhinelander	8th Bishop of Pennsylvania suffragan, 1911-1924; 1924-1931	Succeeded by Francis M. Taitt
