= Francis M. Taitt =

American Episcopal bishop

The Right Reverend Francis M. Taitt D.D., S.T.D., LL.D.
- Bishop of Pennsylvania
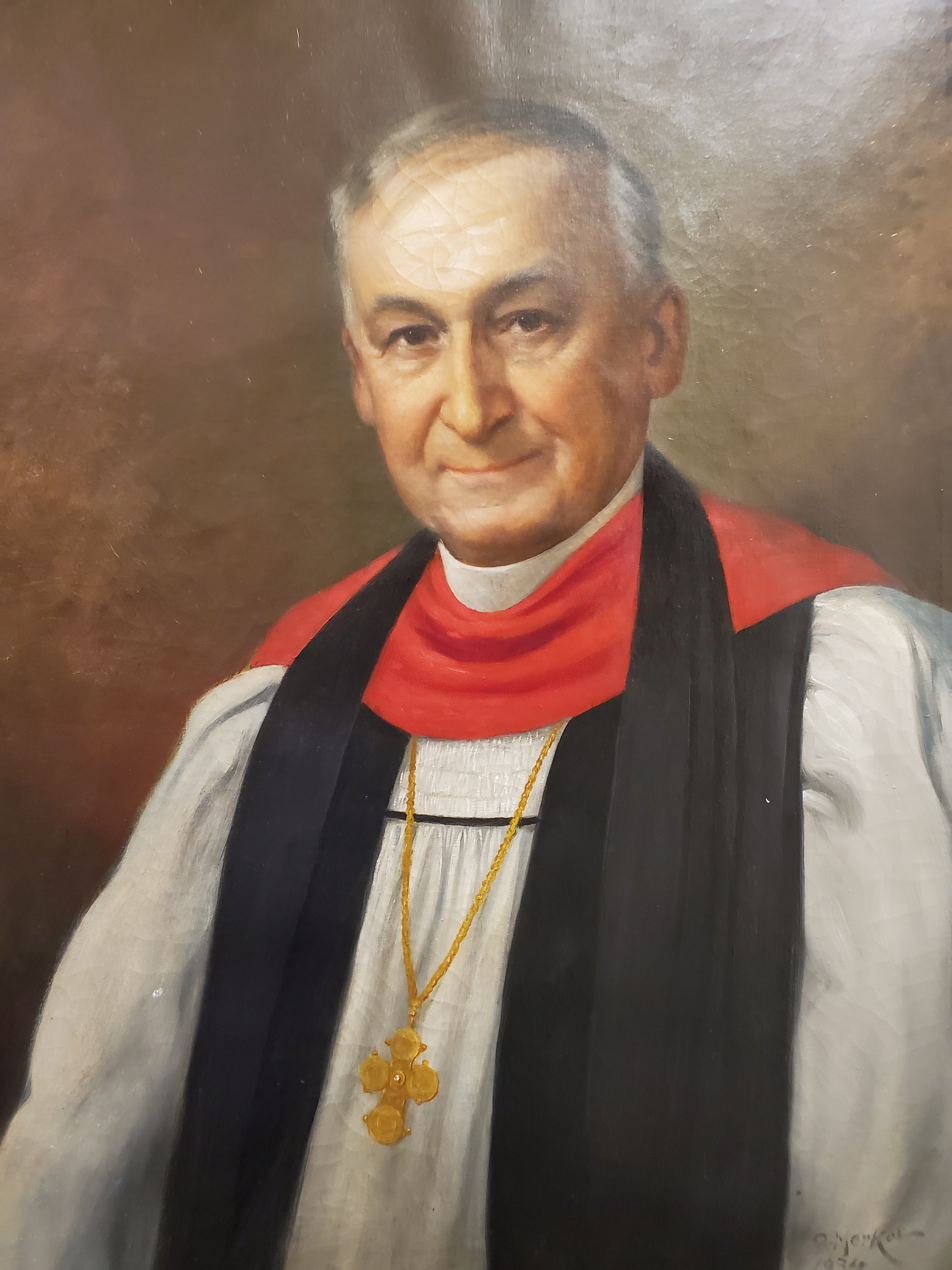
- Church: Episcopal Church
- Diocese: Pennsylvania
- In office: 1931–1943
- Predecessor: Thomas J. Garland
- Successor: Oliver J. Hart
- Previous post: Coadjutor Bishop of Pennsylvania (1929-1931)

Orders
- Ordination: February 2, 1886 by John Scarborough
- Consecration: October 4, 1929 by Thomas J. Garland

Personal details
- Born: January 3, 1862 Burlington, New Jersey, United States
- Died: July 17, 1943 (aged 81) Upland, Pennsylvania, United States
- Buried: Saint Mary's Church, Roxborough, Pennsylvania
- Denomination: Anglican
- Parents: James Monroe Taitt & Elizabeth Ward Conway
- Education: Philadelphia Divinity School

Francis Marion Taitt (January 3, 1862 – July 17, 1943) was the ninth bishop of the Episcopal Diocese of Pennsylvania in The Episcopal Church and served from 1931 to 1943.

== Career ==
Taitt was born in Burlington, New Jersey, and moved with his family to Philadelphia at age 8. He graduated from Philadelphia Divinity School in 1883. He served for four years as curate of Old St. Peter's Church in central Philadelphia, five and a half years as rector of Old Trinity Church in Philadelphia's Southwark neighborhood, and 37 years as rector of Old St. Paul's Church in Chester, Pennsylvania. On October 4, 1929, he was elected Bishop Coadjustor, and became head of the diocese in 1931 following the death of Bishop Thomas J. Garland. In 1937, he organized a pageant, entitled The Drama of Missions, with 1,300 actors.

On June 24, 1940, Taitt offered the invocation at the opening of the second session of the 1940 Republican National Convention.

== Death ==
Bishop Taitt was hospitalized for abdominal surgery at Crozer Hospital, Upland, Pennsylvania, where he died of pneumonia, on July 17, 1943. His remains were entombed in the crypt of the Episcopal Cathedral, now St. Mary's Church, Roxborough, Philadelphia.

== See also ==
- Episcopal Diocese of Pennsylvania
- Succession of Bishops of The Episcopal Church (U.S.)

Episcopal Church (USA) titles
Preceded by Thomas J. Garland	9th Bishop of Pennsylvania coadjutor, 1929-1931; 1931-1943	Succeeded by Oliver J. Hart
