= Robert L. DeWitt =

American bishop

The Right Reverend Robert Lionne DeWitt D.D.
- Bishop of Pennsylvania
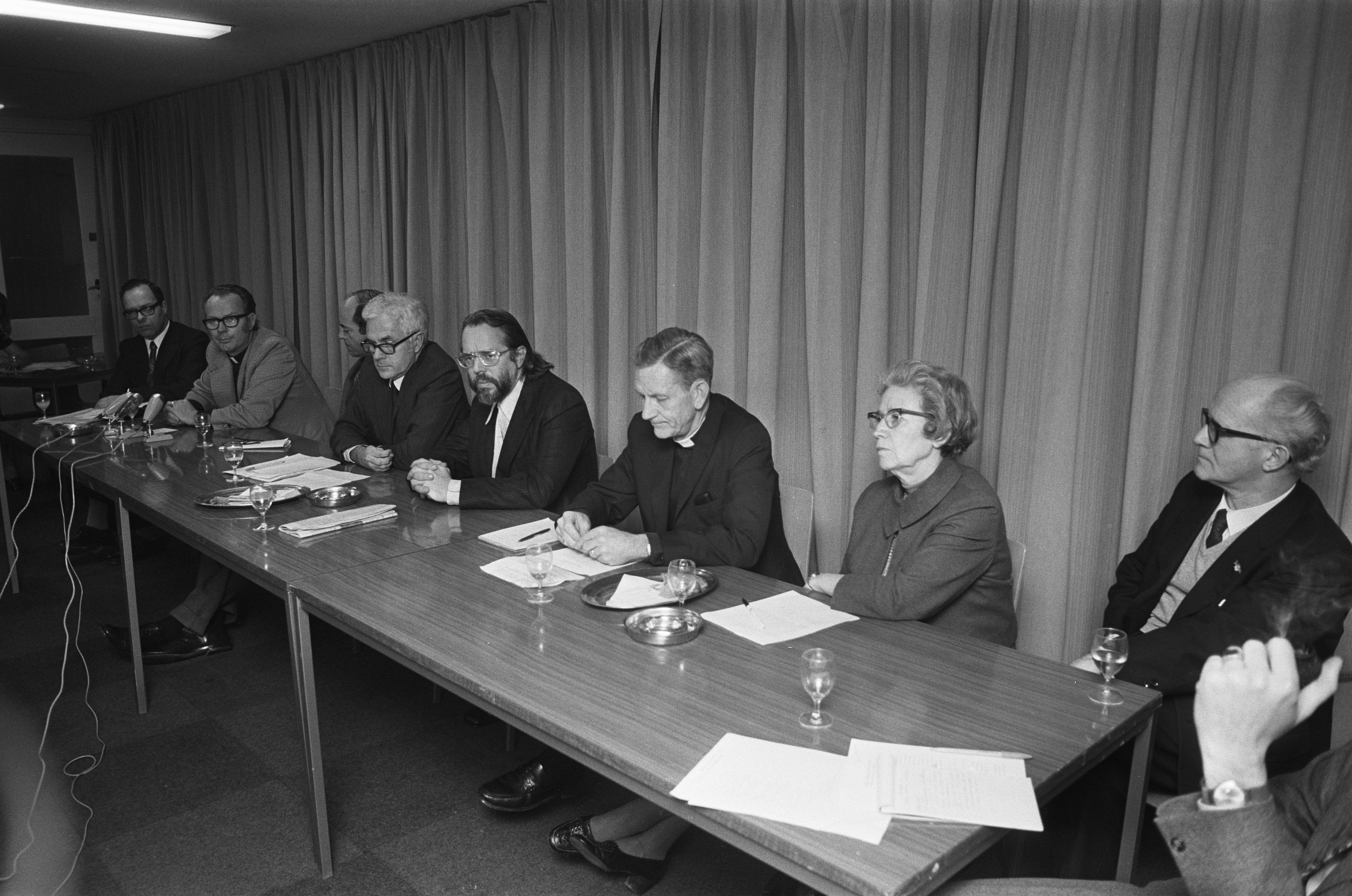
- Robert L. DeWitt (3rd from right, 1973)
- Church: Episcopal Church
- Diocese: Pennsylvania
- In office: 1964–1973
- Predecessor: J. Gillespie Armstrong
- Successor: Lyman Ogilby
- Previous posts: Suffragan Bishop of Michigan (1960-1963); Coadjutor Bishop of Pennsylvania (1963-1964)

Orders
- Ordination: October 1, 1941 by Frank W. Creighton
- Consecration: October 1, 1960 by Arthur C. Lichtenberger

Personal details
- Born: March 12, 1916 Boston, Massachusetts, United States
- Died: November 21, 2003 (aged 87) Saratoga Springs, New York, United States
- Denomination: Anglican
- Parents: William Judson DeWitt & Ethel Furniss
- Spouse: Barbara Ann DeYoe
- Children: 5

Robert Lionne DeWitt (March 12, 1916 - November 21, 2003) was bishop of the Episcopal Diocese of Pennsylvania, serving as diocesan from 1964 to 1973. He became known for fighting against the Vietnam War and racism, as well as working for social justice and the ordination of women as priests.

== Early life and education ==
DeWitt was born and raised in the Jamaica Plain neighborhood of Boston, Massachusetts. Amherst College awarded him a bachelor's degree in 1937, and he graduated from Episcopal Theological School in Cambridge, in 1940. He later received honorary degrees from the Episcopal Divinity School, Haverford College, LaSalle University, Lincoln University, Philadelphia Divinity School, Temple University and the Virginia Theological Seminary. The City of Philadelphia awarded him its Human Rights award in 1973.

== Career ==
He was ordained a priest in Massachusetts and served in the Episcopal Diocese of Michigan before moving to Pennsylvania. Presiding Bishop Arthur C. Lichtenberger, Bishop Angus Dun of Washington, D.C., and Norman Nash of Massachusetts participated in his consecration as suffragan bishop of Michigan. In 1964, Bishop DeWitt transferred to the Diocese of Pennsylvania, after the diocesan convention elected him. He would become the youngest person to serve as bishop in that diocese. He began as coadjutor to Bishop J. Gillespie Armstrong, who unexpectedly died within a month.

Thus DeWitt became Pennsylvania's 12th bishop. Race riots enveloped Chester, Pennsylvania soon after his arrival, and the bishop drove overnight with the dean of the University of Pennsylvania's law school to Harrisburg to urge governor William Scranton to intervene. The following year Bishop DeWitt supported efforts to integrate Girard College, which at the time only admitted white boys. In 1969, he supported a reparations program under which the Episcopal Church paid $500,000, but which caused much divisiveness within the denomination.

His opposition to the Vietnam War and hiring the Rev. Daniel Gracie to counsel young men who wanted to avoid the draft also caused controversy. The Rev. Arthur E. Woolley and other clergy in the diocese called for DeWitt's resignation after Gracie called for burning draft cards. Responding to the controversy, Bishop Dewitt forbade his clergy from making any public calls for civil disobedience.

Bishop DeWitt retired from the Philadelphia episcopate in 1973, and began as editor of Witness magazine and president of the Episcopal Church Publishing Company. However, on July 29, 1974, he, together with retired bishop Edward Welles of West Missouri and retired bishop Daniel Corrigan of Colorado and Bishop Antonio Ramos of Costa Rica ordained 11 women (the Philadelphia 11) at the Church of the Advocate in Philadelphia, despite considerable controversy and threats of violence. The denomination had in 1970 agreed to ordain women as deacons, but was still debating whether to ordain them as priests. Bishop DeWitt and his colleagues were later censured. However, DeWitt continued his activism and attended the ordination of four women in the Diocese of Washington on September 7, 1975. In 1989, his friend the Rev. Barbara Harris was consecrated the first female bishop of the Episcopal Church (in Massachusetts), and by the time of Bishop DeWitt's death, his denomination had ordained over 3,000 women.

== Final years, death and legacy ==
In 1981 DeWitt retired to Isle au Haut, Maine to care for his wife, Barbara Anne DeYoe DeWitt, who had developed Alzheimer's disease. He wrote a book, Ebb Tide, about those experiences. On Isle au Haut, he also arranged for a lobsterman's cooperative and participated in various church and community activities. He died on November 21, 2003, survived by his wife, two daughters, three sons, 14 grandchildren and many great-grandchildren. The former Episcopal Divinity School in Cambridge, Massachusetts established a scholarship fund in his name.

== Bibliography ==
- Episcopal Assistance (1966)
- Ebb Tide: An Encounter with Alzheimer's (Thorofare Press, 2001)

Episcopal Church (USA) titles
Preceded by J. Gillespie Armstrong	12th Bishop of Pennsylvania coadjutor, 1964; 1964-1973	Succeeded by Lyman C. Ogilby
