= Oliver J. Hart =

American bishop and priest

The Right Reverend Oliver James Hart D.D., LL.D.
- Bishop of Pennsylvania
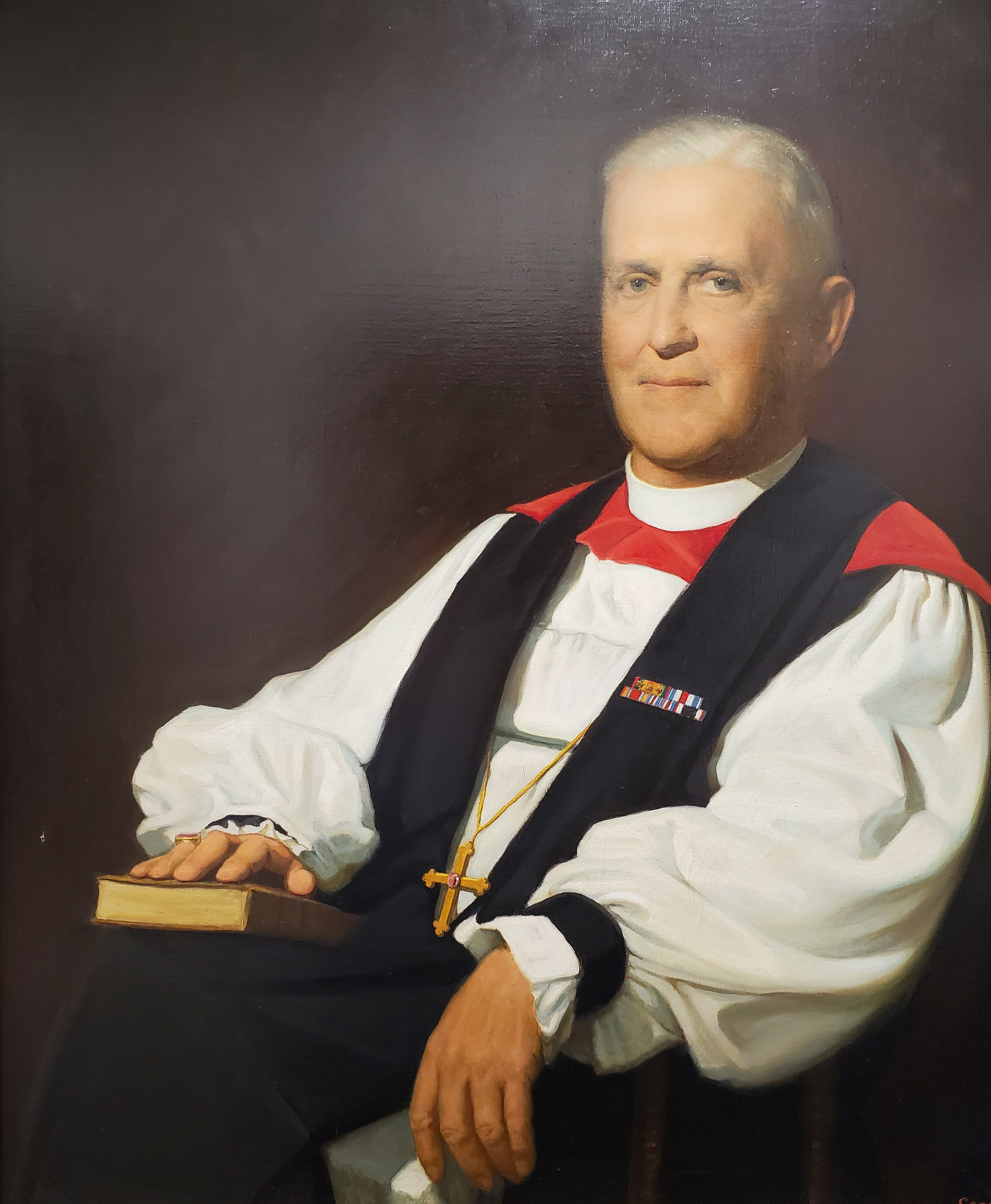
- Church: Episcopal Church
- Diocese: Pennsylvania
- In office: 1943–1963
- Predecessor: Francis Marion Taitt
- Successor: J. Gillespie Armstrong
- Previous post: Coadjutor Bishop of Pennsylvania (1942-1943)

Orders
- Ordination: June 20, 1917 by William A. Guerry
- Consecration: 16 October 1942 by Henry St. George Tucker

Personal details
- Born: July 18, 1892 York, South Carolina, United States
- Died: May 4, 1978 (aged 85) Orange, New Jersey, United States
- Denomination: Anglican
- Parents: George Washington Seabrook Hart and Ellen Almene Hackett
- Spouse: Mary McBee Hart
- Children: 1
- Education: Hobart College

Oliver James Hart (July 18, 1892 – May 4, 1978) was a priest who was elected as coadjutor bishop of the Episcopal Diocese of Pennsylvania, serving as diocesan from 1943 to 1963.

== Early life and education ==
Oliver James Hart was born on July 18, 1892, in York, South Carolina. He graduated from Hobart College in 1913, and earned an S.T.B. from the General Theological Seminary in 1916. He later earned a B.D. from Union Seminary, a LL.D from Hobart College and a D.D. from the University of the South and the University of Chattanooga.

== Career ==
He was ordained a deacon by Bishop Charles Sumner Burch, Suffragan of New York, in 1916 and then to the priesthood ion June 20, 1917, by Bishop William A. Guerry of South Carolina. He was curate of St. Michael's Church, Charleston, South Carolina, that same year. He served as a chaplain during the First World War, becoming chaplain of the First Division. He returned to St. Michael's in 1919 as an assistant minister. From 1920 to 1926 he served at Christ Church, Macon, Georgia. From 1926 to 1934 he served at St. Paul's Church in Chattanooga, Tennessee. He became the rector of St. John's Church, Washington, D.C., in 1934 and continued there until 1940. During that time he declined election as Bishop Coadjutor of the Diocese of Tennessee and then declined election as Bishop Coadjutor of the Diocese of Central New York.

In 1940 he became rector of Trinity Church, Boston. In February 1942 he asked for, and was granted, a leave to serve again as a chaplain in the United States Army. He served as a captain in the Army Chaplains Corps, and was stationed at Fort Dix, New Jersey. He was released from his chaplaincy in October when he was consecrated as the Bishop Coadjutor of the Diocese of Pennsylvania. He would become the Diocesan Bishop in July, 1943 after the death of the Rt. Rev. Francis M. Taitt.

== Death and legacy ==
Upon retiring he and Mrs. Hart had made their home in Castine, Maine. Bishop Hart suffered injuries in a fall on April 22, 1978. He died from complications of the fall on May 4, 1978, at Orange Memorial Hospital, Orange, New Jersey.

Episcopal Church (USA) titles
Preceded by Francis Marion Taitt	10th Bishop of Pennsylvania coadjutor, 1942-1943; 1943-1963	Succeeded by J. Gillespie Armstrong
