= Arthur E. Woolley =

American Episcopal priest

Personal life
- Born: July 27, 1931
- Died: May 29, 2021 (aged 89)
- Spouse: Alma Schelle Woolley ()
- Education: Brooklyn Tech; Andrew Jackson High School; Queens College; Nashotah House; Philadelphia Divinity School

Religious life
- Religion: Christianity
- Denomination: Anglo-Catholicism

Arthur E. Woolley (July 27, 1931 – May 29, 2021) was an Episcopal priest noted for urban activism, racially integrated parishes, and conservative declarations, especially against the ordination of women.

== Early life ==
He was the son of a U.S. Army officer, and lost his mother in childbirth. He attended Brooklyn Tech, Andrew Jackson High School, and Queens College, all in New York City.

At Queens College, he met, and eventually married Alma Schelle. But marrying meant he had to leave the seminary in which he was enrolled, Nashotah House. It had no married housing accommodations so that he could finish his seminary studies at Philadelphia Divinity School (which later merged with the Episcopal Divinity School).

== Career ==
In Jamaica, Queens, he led St. Alban's, a parish of predominantly black congregants and made efforts against "block busting" by local realtors taking advantage of racial fears to force home sales. Moving on to Philadelphia in the 1960s, he merged a mature white parish, St. Barnabas, with a black parish, St. Cyprian's, which had been displaced by redevelopment. After the merger, he ran racially integrated summer camps in the solid white, Italian neighborhood, coopting mainline parishes and parishioners to help.

But he also openly disagreed with the Episcopal diocesan bishop's stance opposing the U.S. military involvement in Vietnam and called for the resignation of the bishop Robert DeWitt after one of his favored clergy called for burning draft cards. Responding to the controversy, Bishop Dewitt forbade his clergy from making any public calls for civil disobedience. Meanwhile, Woolley publicly condemned "phony" peace groups that "decry war" abroad but "condone, excuse, or fail to condemn violence in the streets, riots and other violent means used at home to bring about change."

In 1970, Woolley moved from Philadelphia to Wildwood, New Jersey, to become rector of St. Simeon's by-the-Sea and found controversy there as well. He ran for the North Wildwood school board as a write-in candidate and won. When he criticized the Guidance Department of the K-8 school as "singularly ineffective" and led a vote to eliminate it, the teachers union demanded an apology and filed a grievance against him. He said the union's action was meant "to intimidate freedom of discussion on the part of any member of the board.”

Woolley got involved in other civic affairs, including chairing the diocesan committee on migrant ministry which aided Hispanic farm workers in the rural counties of south jersey and chairing the county's Citizens Advisory Board for Health and Human Health Services. He also paid off the debt of the parish. But it was as co-founder of Operation Junction that he made the most noise as the organization tried to address problems of the youthful tourist population, including drug and alcohol abuse and sexually transmitted disease. It soon went from counselling abusers to treatment, including treatment of VD, and then to providing methadone to heroin addicts.

At the same time, he loudly opposed the ordination of women as priests in the Episcopal Church, saying the issue had "brought the [Episcopal] Church into schism, if it is not actually heretical.". Yet, when the "new" Book of Common Prayer appeared in 1979, Woolley embraced it, and disparaged conservative opposition to it, saying "people who want to go back to the good old days don't know what the good old days were."

Moving on to St. Christopher's in Princeton, Illinois, in the Diocese of Quincy which did not ordain women as priests, he merged two small, rival parishes, St. Christopher's and St. Jude's, Tiskilwa, to make a larger, sustainable congregation. He returned to the east coast in 1986 to become rector of St. Luke's, Bladensburg, MD where he made a splash rejecting the visit of the female suffragan bishop of the Episcopal Diocese of Washington, D.C., Jane Dixon. Woolley wrote to her: "As long as I am rector of St. Luke's, Bladensburg, no woman bishop or priest will be permitted to minister in this cure," a congregation which was described as "very diverse, drawing members from the Caribbean, India and Africa, where they worshiped in the conservative Anglican tradition." "They're certainly not going to change our view, and we're not going to change theirs," said Patrick Delaney, the Senior Warden of the parish, "so why not leave us alone and let us worship in peace? Don't be arrogant or mean-spirited..." Bishop Dixon nonetheless made her official visit bringing 45 supporters with her, joined by nine of St. Luke's parishioners, while Woolley absented himself. Later, after Woolley retired, the parish left the Episcopal Church for the Roman Catholic church which did not ordain women as priests.

Retiring from St. Luke's, Bladensburg, he took on interim rectorships at Mount Calvary, Baltimore, which also later left the Episcopal Church for the Roman Catholic Church and then St. Timothy's, Catonsville, MD, but after his wife, Alma S. Woolley, died, he left the Episcopal Church to join the Anglican Catholic Church, a splinter which opposed both the ordination of women and the “new” 1979 Book of Common Prayer. He became rector of St. Michael and All Angels in Frederick, MD, retiring a fourth time in 2013.
