= Berkley School of Nursing =

- Seal of Georgetown University
- Former names: School of Nursing & Health Studies (2000–2022)
- Type: Private
- Established: 1903
- Parent institution: Georgetown University
- Affiliations: Roman Catholic (Jesuit)
- Dean: Roberta Waite
- Students: 1,650
- Undergraduates: 550
- Postgraduates: 1,100
- Location: Washington, D.C., USA; 38°54′42.6″N 77°4′24.8″W
- Campus: Urban
- Website: nursing.georgetown.edu

The Berkley School of Nursing is the nursing school of Georgetown University. Founded in 1903 as the School of Nursing, it added three other health related majors in 1999 and appended its name to become the School of Nursing & Health Studies. In 2022, the school returned to the name School of Nursing, as the School of Health was divided from it. The school has been at the forefront of education in the health care field, offering many programs unique to America's elite institutions. Offering undergraduate and graduate programs in the health sciences, graduates are prepared to enter the complex fields of medicine, law, health policy, and nursing. The School of Nursing is made up of the Department of Health Systems Administration, the Department of Human Science, the Department of International Health, and the Department of Nursing.

The Department of Human Science completed the Discovery Center in 2006. The Discovery Center includes a Basic Health Science Teaching Laboratory, a Molecular and Cell Biology Research Laboratory, a Cell Culture Room, a Preparation and Instrument Room, and a Zeiss Axiovert 200 microscope.

In 2011, the Department of Nursing launched an online nursing initiative at the graduate level. The online initiative builds upon Georgetown's on-campus graduate nursing program and is the university's first-ever online degree-granting program.

The School of Nursing is home to GUS - Georgetown University Simulator - a full-body, robotic mannequin that can realistically replicate physiological conditions and symptoms and pharmacological responses. The simulator is within the O'Neill Family Foundation Clinical Simulation Center, which includes adult patient simulators, a pediatric patient simulator, five primary care offices, and two hospital units. The Simulation Center is used extensively for clinical education by undergraduate and graduate level nursing programs, as well as by undergraduates in the Department of Human Science.

Several graduate programs within the School of Nursing were ranked in the 2012 "America's Best Graduate Schools" edition of U.S. News & World Report. The Nurse Anesthesia Program was ranked 17th, the Healthcare Management Program was ranked 29th, the Nurse Midwifery Program was ranked 19th, and the nursing graduate program was ranked 36th. The school also has an active research program.

In fall 2025, it will be renamed the Berkley School of Nursing.

== Degrees Offered ==
=== Bachelor of Science ===
- Nursing

=== Master of Science ===
- MS in Nursing
  - AG-ACNP
  - Family Nurse Practitioner
  - Clinical Nurse Leader
  - Nurse Educator
  - Nurse-Midwifery/Women's Health Nurse Practitioner
  - Women's Health Nurse Practitioner

=== Doctoral ===
- Doctor of Nursing Practice
- Doctor of Nurse Anesthesia

=== Online Nursing and Health Studies Programs ===
Georgetown University School of Nursing offers an online Master of Science degree in nursing with four specializations. The online courses operate in a seminar style, and clinical components can be completed at locations in or near students’ home communities. Georgetown's nursing programs are accredited by the Commission on Collegiate Nursing Education.

==== Online FNP Program ====
The online FNP program follows the same curriculum as the on-campus program. The curriculum covers topics such as disease prevention, health promotion, and management of acute and chronic illness. During the OCIs, students can use a simulator at the O’Neill Family Foundation Clinical Simulation Center located within the NHS. This simulator helps students practice in a safe, supervised environment by replicating physiological conditions and symptoms as well as pharmacological responses. Graduates of the program are eligible to sit for the Family Nurse Practitioner certification exam offered by the American Nurses Credentialing Center.

==== Online Midwifery Program ====
Georgetown University's Nurse-Midwifery/Women's Health Nurse Practitioner program was started in 1972 and transitioned to online classes in 2011. Students come to the Georgetown University campus three times during the program for hands-on experience with professors, and log more than a thousand hours of clinical experience in or near their own communities while working with a preceptor. Classes prepare students to manage obstetrical and gynecological needs for women, manage the care of a healthy newborn, and provide primary care to women. Graduates can sit for the Certified Nurse Midwives exam offered by the American Midwifery Certification Board and the Women's Health Nurse Practitioner exam offered by the National Certification Corporation.

== List of deans ==
Deans and superintendents
No.	Name	Years	Notes	Ref.
Superintendents of Nurses and/or Directresses of Nursing School (Approximate Years)
1	Sister Mary Geraldine Austin OSF	1903–1907	Superintendent	
2	Sister Mary Pauline Kiefer OSF	1908–1913	Directress	
3	Sister Mary Bertrand Harding OSF	1908–1920	Superintendent, then directress	
4	Sister Mary Plautilla Casey OSF	1913–1914	Superintendent	
5	Sister Mary Rodriguez Finneran OSF	1914–1926	Superintendent, then directress	
6	Sister Mary Illuminata McBride OSF	1921–1925	Directress	
7	Sister Mary Joanilla Knott OSF	1926–1929	Directress, superintendent	
Superintendents of Nurses and/or Principals/Directresses of Nursing School
8	Sister Mary Euphrasia Markham OSF	1929–1939		
9	Sister Mary Mechtilde Billinger OSF	1940		
10	Sister Mary Joanilla Knott OSF	1940–1945		
Directors of Nursing Education
11	Anne Mary Murphy	1945–1947		
Deans of the School of Nursing
12	Sister Agnes Miriam Payne SCN	1947–1952	Director (1947–1949), then dean	
13	Sister Mary Vincent Kaltenbrun SCN	1950–1951	Acting dean	
14	Sister Angela Maria Carrico SCN	1952–1958		
15	Mary Catherine Wisler	1958	Interim dean	
16	Sister Kathleen Mary Bohan SCN	1958–1963		
17	Ann Douglas	1963–1967		
18	Rose A. McGarrity	1967–1968	Acting dean	
19	Sister Rita Marie Bergeron OSB	1968–1978		
20	Rose A. McGarrity	1978–1980	Acting dean	
21	Elizabeth Hughes	1980–1986		
22	Alma S. Woolley	1986–1992		
23	Elaine L. Larson	1992–1998		
24	Judith Ann Baigis	1998–1999	Interim dean	
25	Bette Rusk Keltner Jacobs	1999–2000		
Deans of the School of Nursing & Health Studies
-	Bette Rusk Keltner Jacobs	2000–2010		
26	Julie DeLoia	2010–2011	Interim dean	
27	Martin Iguchi	2011–2014		
28	Patricia Cloonan	2014–2019	Interim dean from 2014 to 2016	
29	Carole Roan Gresenz	2019–2021	Interim dean	
30	John T. Monahan	2021–2022	Interim dean	
Deans of the School of Nursing
31	Roberta Waite	2022–present		
