= J. Gillespie Armstrong =

American bishop

The Right Reverend Joseph Gillespie Armstrong D.D., S.T.D.
- Bishop of Pennsylvania
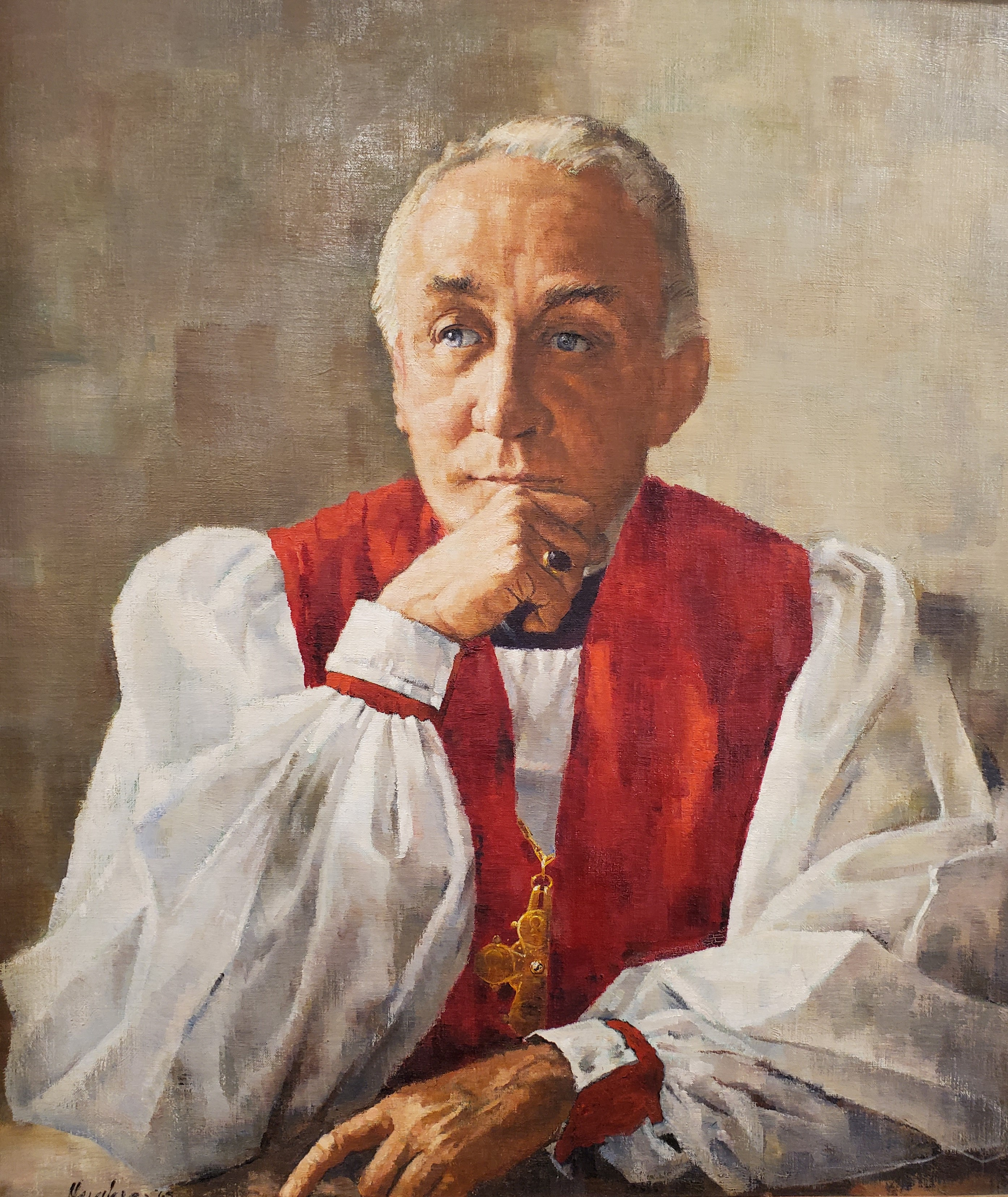
- Church: Episcopal Church
- Diocese: Pennsylvania
- In office: 1963–1964
- Predecessor: Oliver J. Hart
- Successor: Robert L. DeWitt
- Previous posts: Suffragan Bishop of Pennsylvania (1949-1960); Coadjutor Bishop of Pennsylvania (1960-1963)

Orders
- Ordination: November 1931 by Edward T. Helfenstein
- Consecration: October 28, 1949 by Henry Knox Sherrill

Personal details
- Born: October 15, 1901 Warren, Pennsylvania, United States
- Died: April 23, 1964 (aged 62) Bryn Mawr, Pennsylvania, United States
- Buried: Arlington National Cemetery
- Denomination: Anglican
- Parents: Joseph Gillespie Armstrong and Minnie Houston
- Spouse: Clara Vickers Elliot (m.1931-d.1949); Loiuse McKelvey Bray Gillespie
- Education: Johns Hopkins University

Joseph Gillespie Armstrong (October 15, 1901 - April 23, 1964) was an American suffragan bishop of the Episcopal Diocese of Pennsylvania from 1949 until November 7, 1960, when he was elected coadjutor. He succeeded Rt. Rev. Oliver J. Hart as Bishop of Pennsylvania when Bishop Hart retired on July 19, 1963. However Bishop Armstrong's diocesan episcopate only lasted nine months before his death.

== Biography ==
Armstrong was born in Warren, Pennsylvania, but raised in Virginia. Johns Hopkins University in Baltimore, Maryland, awarded him a B.A. in 1928; after which he graduated from General Theological Seminary in 1931.

Ordained priest in 1932, Armstrong served as rector of Severn Parish (also called St. Stephen's Crownsville) near Annapolis, Maryland, and of Christ Church (Georgetown, Washington, D.C.), then as chaplain in the United States Navy in World War II. After his military discharge, Armstrong served several years as rector at St. Mary's Episcopal Church in Ardmore, Pennsylvania.

On May 11, 1949 the diocesan convention elected Armstrong as suffragan to assist Bishop Hart. The Presiding Bishop Henry Knox Sherrill assisted bishop Hart and bishop suffragan Remington of Pennsylvania in his consecration, as did bishops, Powell of Maryland and bishop suffragan Banyard of New Jersey on October 28, 1949. He was installed as Suffragan bishop of Pennsylvania on November 15, 1949. Bishop Armstrong then assisted the diocesan bishop Hart in administering the diocese for many years until Bishop Hart's retirement. On April 1, 1964, Robert L. DeWitt, suffragan bishop of Michigan, was elected as his coadjutor, and became his successor.

Bishop Armstrong died at home in Bryn Mawr, Pennsylvania, survived by his second wife and daughters. He is buried at Arlington National Cemetery.

Episcopal Church (USA) titles
Preceded by Oliver J. Hart	11th Bishop of Pennsylvania (suffragan, 1949-1960) coadjutor, 1960-1963; 1963–1964	Succeeded by Robert L. DeWitt
