= Mary Euphrasia Markham =

Religious sister, university administrator

Sister Mary Euphrasia Markham O. S. F.

Personal details
- Born: January 1, 1899 Wilmington, Delaware, US
- Died: April 17, 1973 (aged 72) Washington, D.C., US
- Denomination: Roman Catholic
- Occupation: Religious sister, university administrator. Principal (equivalent of dean) of Georgetown University's School of Nursing
- Education: Georgetown University, Nursing Diploma, 1920, Bachelor of Science degree, 1926; Saint Louis University Graduate School, Master in Hospital Administration, 1959

Mary Euphrasia Markham, O.S.F. (January 1, 1899 – April 17, 1973), born Therese Markham, was an American Franciscan religious sister and the Principal of Georgetown University's School of Nursing in Washington, D.C. from 1929 to 1939. She earned a nursing diploma in 1920, and then added a Bachelor of Science degree in 1926, 43 years before Georgetown officially admitted women in 1969. In 1957 she received the John Carroll Award, the highest honor bestowed by Georgetown University, and she was the first woman to receive it. When she received the award she was administrator of St. Francis Hospital in Wilmington, Delaware, and superior of its nursing team. In 1959 she completed a Master's in Hospital Administration from Saint Louis University, a Jesuit school in the same system as Georgetown.
