= Alma S. Woolley =

American nurse, nurse educator, nursing historian and author

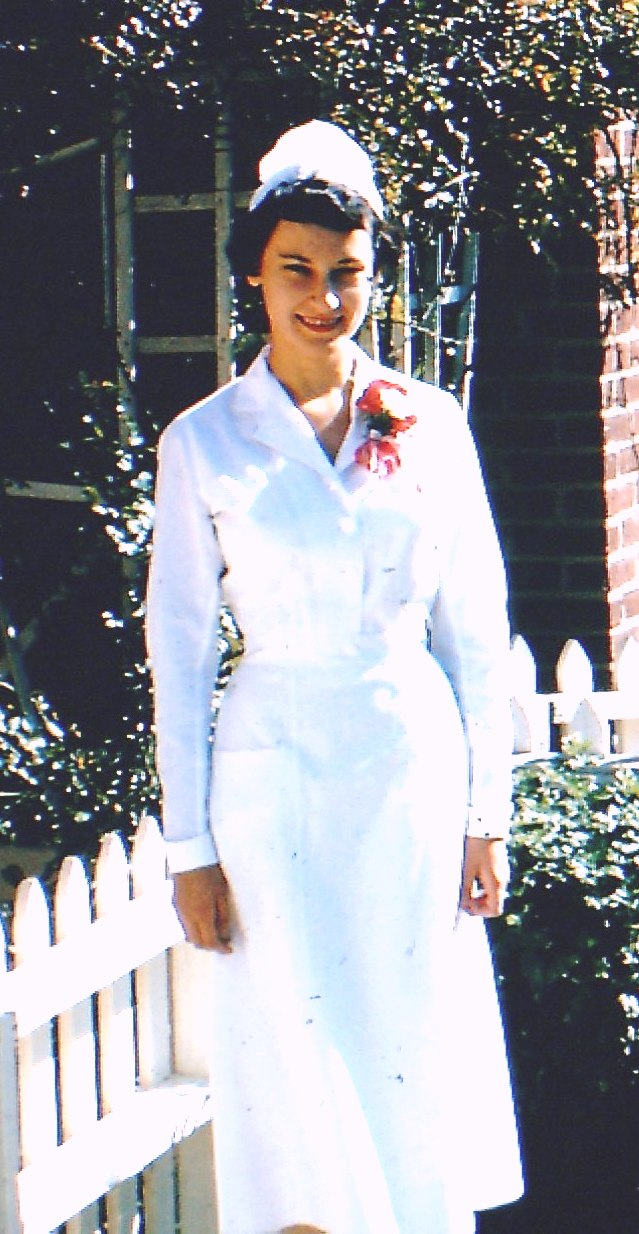
- Alma Woolley on graduation day, Cornell University's School of Nursing, 1954
- Born: October 3, 1931; New York City
- Died: December 17, 2005 (aged 74); Baltimore
- Education: University of Pennsylvania
- Occupation: Nurse
- Years active: 1969 - 1996
- Known for: nursing, nursing education, history of nursing
- Medical career
- Profession: Nurse, educator
- Field: medical-surgical nursing
- Institutions: Visiting Nurse Service of New York, Stockton University, Illinois Wesleyan University, Georgetown School of Nursing

Alma S. Woolley (October 3, 1931, New York City – December 17, 2005, Baltimore) was an American nurse, nurse educator, nursing historian, and author. She led several schools of nursing, and authored a number of books and articles on nursing education, the history of nursing education, and nurses.

== Early years and education ==
Woolley grew up a child of the depression in the Bronx, New York City: Her father, hit by a truck, died on his way to a public hospital; her maternal grandmother who had worked in a sweatshop made all her clothes; her widowed mother worked as a stenographer for GM; but Woolley, who said "as a twelve year old, I admired the smart gray uniforms with the red trimming" of the Cadet Nurse Corps (during World War II), was selected to go to the elite all-girls Hunter College High School to which she commuted by public transport one hour each way. At Hunter, she won the all-city Latin Poetry Contest in 1949 and graduated second in her class, subsequently attending Queens College and then Cornell University's School of Nursing, which granted her a bachelor's degree in 1954. She subsequently joined the Visiting Nurse Service of New York, married, and worked at a number of hospitals including Mary Immaculate Hospital in Jamaica, Queens and, moving to Philadelphia with her husband, Arthur E. Woolley, at Philadelphia General Hospital, and Jefferson Medical College. She later became a nursing instructor at the University of Pennsylvania, enrolled in their graduate program and was granted an M.S. in medical-surgical nursing in 1965, an accomplishment which led to one of her early articles in The American Journal of Nursing, "My Lamp Is Refueled," explaining how and why she kept up with her field while rearing four small children.

== Career ==
Having moved to New Jersey with her husband and children in 1969, Woolley became an instructor at Atlantic Community College, but was soon offered the task of creating a B.S. degree program in nursing for The Richard Stockton College of New Jersey which had opened its doors in 1971. The original program she designed was for registered nurses, R.N.'s, without a university degree, to complete a Bachelor of Science in nursing. The transition of nursing education from that of R.N.'s trained in non-university programs, to 4-year B.S.N. programs or their equivalent was a matter of advocacy for Woolley as well as profession, and she subsequently published a number of pieces demonstrating the benefits of university-based nursing programs.

In 1980, she was awarded a doctorate in nursing education by the University of Pennsylvania. In 1981, she was appointed Director of the School of Nursing at Illinois Wesleyan University and the Caroline F. Rupert Professor of Nursing, and in 1986 left Wesleyan to become Dean of Georgetown University School of Nursing and Health Studies. In 1989 she received the Distinguished Alumnus Award from the Cornell School of Nursing Alumni Association. She stepped down as dean of Georgetown's School of Nursing in 1992 and returned to teaching and writing, retiring as professor emeritus of nursing in 1996, and becoming visiting professor at both the University of Maryland School of Nursing in Baltimore, Md, and the Uniformed Services University of the Health Sciences.

She wrote or contributed to biographies of nurses including Maude Francis Essig who served with American combat troops in World War I, and Virginia Matthews Dunbar, an early advocate of university curricula for nurses.

Reflecting her view that "the history of nursing education is an important lacuna in general histories of nursing" and that "as part of public history in the United States, nursing education can cite many accomplishments in the realm of health care policy," Woolley also published histories of nursing schools, including "Nuns and Guns" and Learning, Faith and Caring. But before her death in 2005, she was working on oral histories of women who, like her, had been recently admitted as members to the once all-male Cosmos Club of Washington, D.C.
