= Nicholas Knisely =

The Right Reverend W. Nicholas Knisely Jr. SOSc
- Bishop of Rhode Island
- Church: Episcopal Church
- Diocese: Rhode Island
- Elected: June 2, 2012
- Installed: November 17, 2012
- Predecessor: Geralyn Wolf
- Previous post: Dean of Trinity Cathedral

Orders
- Ordination: 1991 (deacon); 1992 (priest)
- Consecration: November 17, 2012 by Katharine Jefferts Schori

Personal details
- Born: 1960 (age 65–66) Pennsylvania
- Denomination: Anglican
- Parents: William Nicholas Knisely & Joann Amelia Myers
- Spouse: Karen
- Children: 1
- Education: Franklin & Marshall College

William Nicholas Knisely Jr. (born 1960) is the thirteenth and current diocesan bishop of the Episcopal Diocese of Rhode Island.

== Early life and education ==
Knisely was born and raised in Pennsylvania. He graduated with a Bachelor of Science degree from Franklin and Marshall College in Lancaster, Pennsylvania, then went on to do graduate work at the University of Delaware. While a graduate student in Physics and Astronomy at Delaware, he decided to study for the priesthood, going on to Yale University's Berkeley Divinity School. In 1991, he completed his Masters of Divinity and was ordained to the diaconate in Delaware, and, in the following year, to the priesthood. In 2013, he received an Honorary Doctor of Divinity degree from Berkeley Divinity School at Yale.

== Ministry ==
Nicholas served initially as a priest in Delaware, Western and Eastern Pennsylvania, before becoming dean of the Episcopal cathedral in Phoenix, Arizona. While a priest in Bethlehem, Pennsylvania, he also taught physics and astronomy at Lehigh University. In his clerical duties, he was active in ministries that focused on homelessness, communications, college and youth, finance, and ecumenical relations.

Knisely was the first person to chair the General Convention Standing Commission on Communications and Technology. Additionally, he participated in the Moravian-Episcopal dialog that drew up the agreement on full communion between the two denominations.

== See also ==
- List of Episcopal bishops of the United States
- Historical list of the Episcopal bishops of the United States

Episcopal Church (USA) titles
Preceded by Geralyn Wolf	13th Bishop of Rhode Island; 17 November 2012 - Present	Succeeded by Incumbent
