= Alexander Mackay-Smith =

American bishop (1850–1911)

The Right Reverend Alexander Mackay-Smith D.D., S.T.D.
- Bishop of Pennsylvania
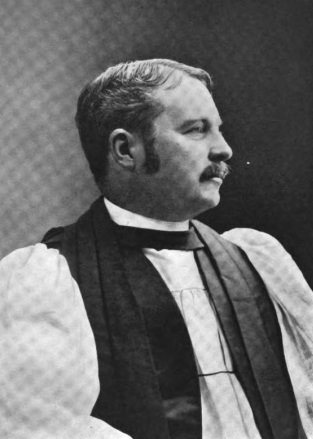
- Church: Episcopal Church
- Diocese: Pennsylvania
- In office: 1911
- Predecessor: Ozi William Whitaker
- Successor: Philip M. Rhinelander
- Previous post: Coadjutor Bishop of Pennsylvania (1902-1911)

Orders
- Ordination: December 19, 1877 by Benjamin Henry Paddock
- Consecration: May 1, 1902 by William Croswell Doane

Personal details
- Born: June 2, 1850 New Haven, Connecticut, United States
- Died: November 16, 1911 (aged 61) Philadelphia, Pennsylvania, United States
- Buried: Woodlawn Cemetery (Bronx, New York)
- Denomination: Anglican
- Parents: Nathan Smith & Grace Caroline Bradley
- Spouse: Virginia Stuart

Alexander Mackay-Smith (June 2, 1850 – November 16, 1911) was sixth bishop of the Episcopal Diocese of Pennsylvania, serving as diocesan bishop in 1911 only. His residence, the Bishop Mackay-Smith House, is listed on the National Register of Historic Places.

== Biography ==
Mackay-Smith was born on June 2, 1850, in New Haven, Connecticut, the son of Nathan Smith and Grace Caroline Bradley. He was educated at St Paul's School in Concord, New Hampshire, and then at Trinity College from where he graduated in 1872. He then studied for three years in England and Germany. In 1876 he returned to the United States and took his examinations in divinity at Berkeley Divinity School.

== Ordained ministry ==
He was ordained deacon by Bishop John Williams in 1876, after which he became assistant at All Saints' Church in Worcester, Massachusetts. He was ordained priest on December 19, 1877, by Bishop Benjamin Henry Paddock after which he became missioner at Grace Church in South Boston. In 1880 he became assistant priest at Saint Thomas' Church. New York City, while in 1887 he became Archdeacon of New York. Between 1893 and 1902 he served as rector of St John's Church in Washington, D.C.

== Episcopacy ==
Mackay-Smith was elected Coadjutor Bishop of Pennsylvania in 1902 and was consecrated on May 1, 1902, in Trinity Church, Philadelphia with Bishop William Croswell Doane of Albany as chief consecrator. He succeeded as diocesan bishop on February 9, 1911, upon the death of his predecessor, however, he called for the election of a coadjutor bishop a few months later due to his deteriorating health. Philip M. Rhinelander was elected and consecrated as a coadjutor that same year and Mackay-Smith announced his resignation to become effective on February 10, 1912. However, he did not make it that far and died on November 16, 1911, in Philadelphia.

Episcopal Church (USA) titles
Preceded by Ozi William Whitaker	6th Bishop of Pennsylvania coadjutor, 1902-1911	Succeeded by Philip M. Rhinelander
