= Franklin D. Turner =

American prelate (1933–2013)

The Right Reverend Franklin Delton Turner D.D.
- Suffragan Bishop of Pennsylvania
- Church: Episcopal Church
- Diocese: Pennsylvania
- Elected: June 1988
- In office: 1988–2000

Orders
- Ordination: December 1965 by C. Avery Mason
- Consecration: October 7, 1988 by Edmond L. Browning

Personal details
- Born: July 19, 1933 Norwood, North Carolina, United States
- Died: December 31, 2013 (aged 80) Philadelphia, Pennsylvania, United States
- Denomination: Anglican
- Parents: James Turner & Dora Streeter
- Spouse: Barbara Dickerson
- Children: 3

Franklin Delton Turner (July 19, 1933–December 31, 2013), was an American prelate of the Episcopal Church who served as the Suffragan Bishop of Pennsylvania from 1988 to 2000.

== Early life and education ==
Turner was born in Norwood, North Carolina on July 19, 1933, the son of James and Dora S. Turner. He gained his Bachelor of Arts in Sociology and History from Livingstone College in 1956. He also graduated with a Bachelor of Sacred Theology from Berkeley Divinity School in 1965 with a Master of Divinity. Between 1961 and 1962 he also studied some social work courses at the West Virginia University. He married Barbara Dickerson and together had two daughters and a son.

== Ordained ministry ==
He was ordained to the diaconate in June 1965 by the Leland Stark, the Bishop of Newark, and to the priesthood later on that same year. He then became vicar of the Church of the Epiphany in Dallas, Texas and in 1966 became rector of St George's Church in Washington, D.C., a post he retained till 1972. He was also Staff Officer for Black Ministries and Founder and President Washington Episcopal Clergy Association. He was a member of the Board of Directors of the Kanuga Conference Center and a member of the Board of Trustees of Berkeley/Yale Divinity School. He was an advocate for recruitment of Black leaders for Ministry and foundered the organization of Black Episcopal Seminarians.

== Bishop ==
Turner was consecrated Suffragan Bishop of the Diocese of Pennsylvania on October 7, 1988, in the Roman Catholic Cathedral of St Peter and St Paul by Presiding Bishop Edmond L. Browning. He served in the post till his retirement in 2000.
