= Allen L. Bartlett =

American priest

The Right Reverend Allen Lyman Bartlett Jr. D.D., D. Min.
- Bishop of Pennsylvania
- Church: Episcopal Church
- Diocese: Pennsylvania
- In office: 1987–1998
- Predecessor: Lyman Ogilby
- Successor: Charles E. Bennison
- Other post: Assistant Bishop of Washington (2001-2004)
- Previous post: Coadjutor Bishop of Pennsylvania (1986-1987)

Orders
- Ordination: June 16, 1959 by Charles Carpenter
- Consecration: February 13, 1986 by Edmond L. Browning

Personal details
- Born: September 20, 1929 (age 96) Birmingham, Alabama, United States
- Denomination: Anglican
- Parents: Allen Lyman Bartlett & Edith Buell West
- Spouse: Jerriette L. Kohlmeier (m. 1957)
- Children: 3

Allen Lyman Bartlett Jr. (born September 20, 1929) is an Episcopal priest who became coadjutor bishop in the Episcopal Diocese of Pennsylvania, the fourth largest in the country. He succeeded Bishop Lyman Ogilby as the diocese's 14th bishop until his retirement. After retirement, he assisted in his former diocese as well as other dioceses, including the Episcopal Diocese of Washington (2001-2004).

== Early life, education and family life ==
Born in Alabama, Bartlett graduated from the University of the South in 1951. He worked as a reporter and served in the United States Navy, where he was stationed in Hawai'i as a Lieutenant (junior grade). He attended the Virginia Theological Seminary, which awarded him a Master of Divinity degree. He later received D.D. degrees from both institutions. He married the former Jerriette Kohlmeier

== Career ==
After ordination to the priesthood in 1959, Bartlett served at parishes in Alabama and West Virginia, including as rector of historic Zion Church in Charles Town, West Virginia from 1961 to 1970. As Dean of Christ Church Cathedral (Louisville, Kentucky) from 1970 to 1986, he formed an inner-city street ministry to serve the poor and homeless, as well as facilitated civic, ecclesiastical and artistic events in the cathedral.

He moved to Philadelphia in 1986 to become coadjutor to bishop Lyman Ogilby, and succeeded him as bishop. Approximately 6500 people and 17 bishops led by Presiding Bishop Edmund L. Browning and bishop Ogilby attended his consecration at the Philadelphia Civic Center. While the controversy over ordination of women calmed somewhat, that concerning race relations continued. Bartlett also became embroiled in controversy concerning the ordination of gay persons.

Since his retirement, Bishop Bartlett has assisted in the Episcopal Diocese of Washington (2001-2004) (initially with congregations resisting bishop pro tempore Jane Holmes Dixon and later under Bishop John Chane,. He also participated in the Pennsylvania diocese's oral history project.

Episcopal Church (USA) titles
Preceded by Lyman Ogilby	14th Bishop of Pennsylvania coadjutor, 1986; 1987-1998	Succeeded by Charles Bennison
