= Ann Holmes Redding =

Ann Holmes Redding (born October 22, 1951) is a former Episcopal priest, who was defrocked in April 2009 for having become a Muslim in March 2006. She grew up in Cheyney, Pennsylvania. Her father, Louis L. Redding, was a prominent civil rights lawyer in Delaware.

Redding identifies with both faiths "100 percent", explaining that this is possible in the same way that she can be both an African American and a woman. Her remarks have evoked excitement and controversy among both the Episcopal and Muslim communities. She continues to worship in the Episcopal Church, as well as with Al-Islam Center of Seattle.

Redding was placed under pastoral direction by Geralyn Wolf of the Episcopal Diocese of Rhode Island, which has disciplinary authority over her, in July 2007. Following the 15 months of pastoral direction and six months of inhibition, Redding was deposed ("defrocked") by Wolf on April 1, 2009, one week after her 25th ordination anniversary.

Redding is a graduate of Brown University (AB, 1976), the General Theological Seminary (M Div, 1983), and Union Theological Seminary (PhD, 1999). She has taught at Pacific Lutheran University, Payne Theological Seminary, and the Interdenominational Theological Center, among other institutions. At the time she became a Muslim, she was Director of Faith Formation and Renewal at St. Mark's Episcopal Cathedral, Seattle, where she continued to work until she was laid off (along with two colleagues) in March 2007. She was visiting assistant professor at the School of Theology and Ministry at Seattle University from September 2007 through June 2008.

Redding has continued to speak, preach, teach, and write since the convergence of Islam and Christianity in her faith and practice. Venues include Riverside Church in New York City, Oberlin College in Ohio, the Claremont School of Theology in California, and the Center for Spiritual Living, St. Stephen's Episcopal Church, Seattle First Baptist Church, and Westside Unitarian Church in Seattle. She is the co-author, with Jamal Rahman and Katheen Schmitt Elias, of Out of Darkness Into Light: Spiritual Guidance in the Quran with Reflections from Christian and Jewish Sources (Morehouse Publishing, 2009).
