= Norman S. Binsted =

American Episcopal/Anglican bishop

Styles of Norman S. Binsted
- Religious style: The Right Reverend

Norman Spencer Binsted (October 2, 1890 – February 20, 1961) was a Canadian-born American missionary bishop of the Episcopal Church in the United States of America, serving first in the Nippon Sei Ko Kai and later in the Philippines.

Binsted was born in Toronto, Canada to Thomas William Binsted and Ann Monnier. His family moved to the United States in 1901 and he was naturalized in 1904.

He graduated at Saint John's College in Uniontown, Kentucky and at the Virginia Theological Seminary, and was made a deacon in 1915. He was later ordained priest in Japan in 1916. He also attended Columbia University and the University of London. He obtained his Doctor of Divinity at the Virginia Theological Seminary. The Virginia Theological Seminary and General Theological Seminary also awarded him honorary degrees.

He was Bishop of Tohoku from 1928 until 1940, and was Bishop of the Philippines until his retirement in 1957. He received from General Douglas MacArthur, the Medal of Freedom for having assisted prisoners of war. He died in Hendersonville, North Carolina after an illness for several months. He was survived by his wife, Willie Mower Gibson Binsted. He was interred at the Episcopal Church of the Transfiguration Cemetery in Bat Cave, North Carolina.

== Consecrators ==
Binsted was consecrated on December 3, 1928, by:

- John Gardner Murray, 16th Presiding Bishop
- John McKim (assistant)
- Henry St. George Tucker (assistant)
