= Philadelphia Episcopal Cathedral =

Historic church in Pennsylvania, United States

- Protestant Episcopal Church of the Saviour (now Philadelphia Episcopal Cathedral)
- U.S. National Register of Historic Places
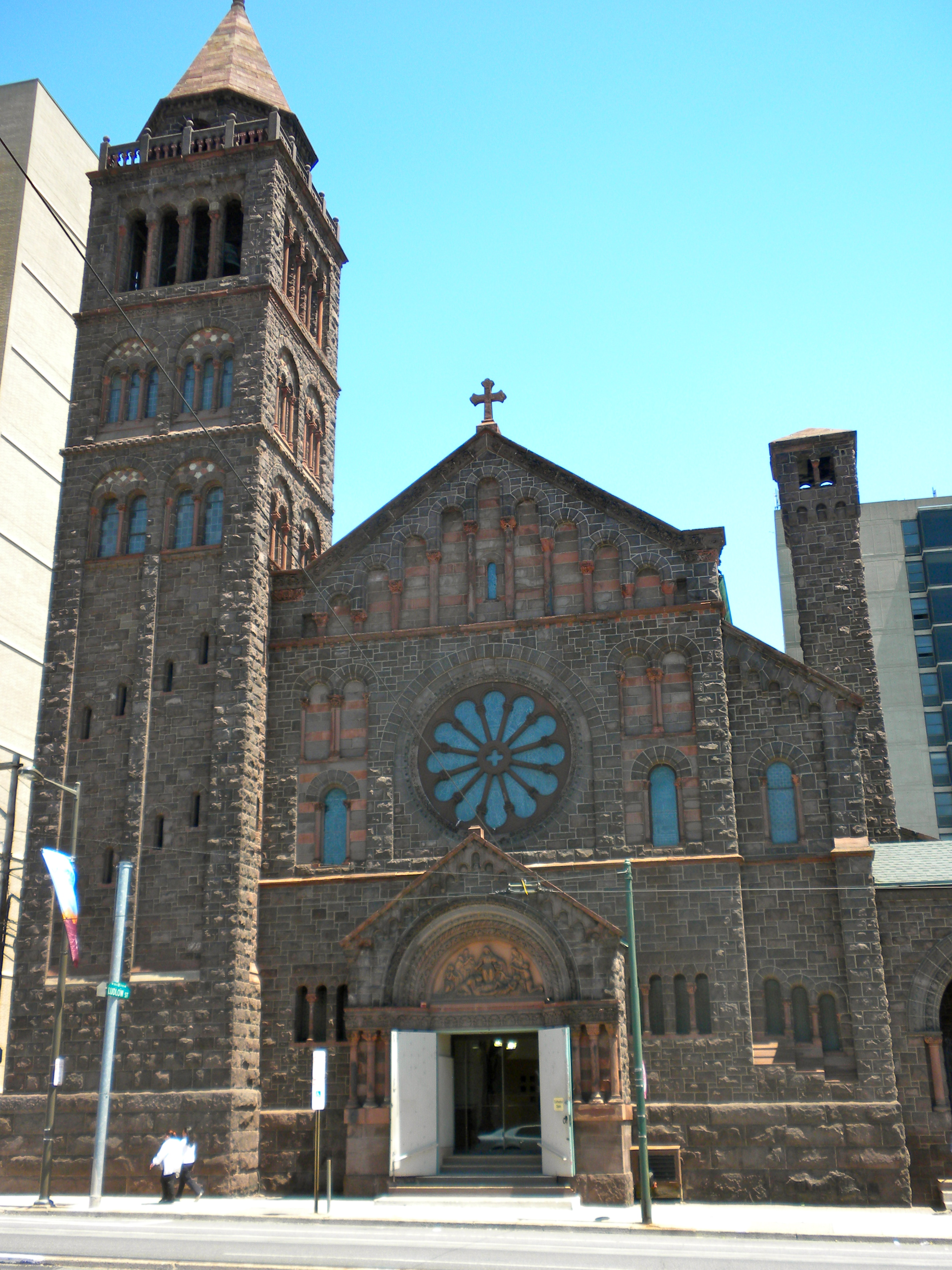
- Philadelphia Episcopal Cathedral, May 2010

- Location within Philadelphia Location within Pennsylvania Location within the United States
- Location: 19 S. 38th St., Philadelphia, Pennsylvania, United States
- Coordinates: 39°57′20″N 75°11′54″W
- Area: 0.3 acres (0.12 ha)
- Built: 1855, 1898, 1902-1906
- Architect: Burns, Charles M. Jr.
- Architectural style: Romanesque, Italian Romanesque
- Website: https://www.philadelphiacathedral.org/
- NRHP reference No.: 79002328
- Added to NRHP: August 01, 1979

Philadelphia Episcopal Cathedral, located at 38th and Ludlow Streets in West Philadelphia, is the cathedral church of the Episcopal Diocese of Pennsylvania. The cathedral reported 200 members in 2025. Plate and pledge income for the congregation in 2025 was $215,868 with average Sunday attendance (ASA) of 104.

Formerly known as the Protestant Episcopal Church of the Saviour, it was built in 1855, renovated in 1898, and rebuilt in the year 1906, after an April 16, 1902 fire.

In 1992 it became the seat of the Episcopal Diocese of Pennsylvania.

The building was added to the National Register of Historic Places in 1979.

== Recent history ==
A highly-controversial renovation of the interior was undertaken, 2000–2002, under then-cathedral dean Richard Giles, author of Re-Pitching the Tent: Re-Ordering the Church Building for Worship and Mission. The pews, altar, and other church furniture were removed and sold and the decorated stone walls were stuccoed over and whitewashed. Modernist chairs and lighting fixtures in a severely minimalist style were introduced. The baptismal font was joined by an immersion pool for adults. These radical changes divided the congregation and were severely criticized in the press as 'cultural vandalism'.

In 2012, facing an estimated $3.5 million bill to renovate its bell tower, then cathedral dean Judith Sullivan petitioned the Philadelphia Historical Commission for permission to demolish wholesale its brownstone Romanesque parish house and rectory, both NRHP-certified buildings. The demolition was approved and site completely filled with a 25-story apartment building which towers over the cathedral.

== See also ==
- List of the Episcopal cathedrals of the United States
- List of cathedrals in the United States
