= Episcopal Diocese of Pennsylvania =

Episcopal Church diocese in the US

Coordinates: 39.94599°N 75.14830°W

Diocese of Pennsylvania Diœcesis Pennsilvaniensis

Location
- Country: United States
- Territory: Philadelphia, Montgomery, Bucks, Chester, Delaware
- Ecclesiastical province: Province III

Statistics
- Congregations: 129 (2025)
- Members: 29,327 (2025)

Information
- Denomination: Episcopal Church
- Established: May 24, 1784
- Cathedral: Philadelphia Episcopal Cathedral
- Language: English, Spanish

Current leadership
- Bishop: Daniel G. P. Gutierrez

Map
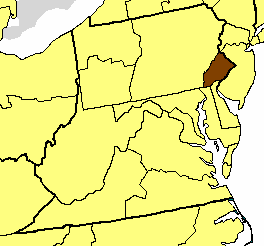
- Location of the Diocese of Pennsylvania

Website
- diopa.org

The Episcopal Diocese of Pennsylvania is a diocese of the Episcopal Church of the United States, encompassing the counties of Philadelphia, Montgomery, Bucks, Chester, and Delaware in the state of Pennsylvania. In March 2016, Daniel G. P. Gutierrez was elected Bishop Diocesan; he was consecrated and assumed office on July 16, 2016. Upon becoming bishop in 2016, Gutiérrez implemented a strategy of experimentation and adaptation.

The diocese reported 42,317 members in 2015 and 29,327 members in 2025. Plate and pledge income for the 133 filing congregations of the diocese in 2025 was $30,110,541. Average Sunday attendance (ASA) reported for 2025 was 8,439 persons. This was a relative decline from 12,506 reported attending average Sunday services in 2016.

== History ==
=== 17th century and 18th century ===
Quakers founded Pennsylvania, but members of the Church of England were present from the beginning. They established nine congregations, including Christ Church in Philadelphia (1695), Old Trinity Church in Oxford (1696), St. Thomas' Church in Whitemarsh (1698), St. Martin's Church in Marcus Hook (1699), St. David's Church in Radnor (1700), St. Paul's Church in Chester (1702) and St. John's Church in Concord (1702) in the colony's first twenty years. After the American Revolution, Anglicans became known as Episcopalians. Led by the William White, they organized the Episcopal Diocese of Pennsylvania in 1784. White became the diocese's first bishop three years later, and it grew rapidly during his episcopacy (1787–1836). The diocese spanned a vast area, extending from Philadelphia to Pittsburgh.

=== 19th century ===
In 1865, a new Episcopal Diocese of Pittsburgh took responsibility for every parish west of the Alleghenies. By 1910, there were five Episcopal dioceses in Pennsylvania, and the Diocese of Pennsylvania covered only the southeastern corner of the commonwealth.

Bishop White favored the "middle way," a balance between individual piety and shared ritual, between parish autonomy and centralized leadership. Some of his successors (e.g. Henry Ustick Onderdonk, 1836–1844) tried to reconcile those committed to "high" and "low" church beliefs and practices. The emergence of "liberal" theology at the end of the nineteenth century heightened tensions.

The diocese established a divinity school in 1858. It took account of the sick and the poor, sponsoring such organizations as Episcopal Hospital (1852) and the City Mission (1870), the forerunner of today's Episcopal Community Services.

=== 20th century ===
In the 1920s and accelerating two decades later, many Episcopalians left Philadelphia altogether. New congregations appeared almost overnight in suburbs like Newtown Square (St. Alban's, 1922), Gladwyne (St. Christopher's, 1949), Levittown (St. Paul's, 1953), and Maple Glen (St. Matthews, 1967). Others experience unprecedented growth in the 1950s (Redeemer, Bryn Mawr, 1851). Bishop Oliver J. Hart (1943–1963) wrestled with the implications of suburbanization. While the city parishes supported the creation of parishes and missions outside of Philadelphia the generation or two before, these congregations outside the city did not always empathize with the social and economic problems of their urban brethren.

African Americans have worshipped in the Diocese of Pennsylvania since its inception. As slaves and free persons, they attended services at some of its most venerable congregations. Absalom Jones, the founder with Richard Allen of the Free African Society in 1787, organized Saint Thomas, the first independent black church in America, in 1794. Jones became an Episcopal deacon in 1795 and a priest in 1804. All-black congregations were not common in Philadelphia until the city's African American population expanded in the first half of the twentieth century. By 1980 the parish Jones once led (known today as the African Episcopal Church of Saint Thomas) had become one of the largest (black or white) in the diocese. Many black Episcopalians now worshiped by themselves in parishes that had once been all white or integrated (Church of the Advocate, Philadelphia, 1886).

Until Robert L. DeWitt (1964–1973) became its twelfth bishop in 1964, the Diocese of Pennsylvania largely ignored the civil rights movement. During his nine years at the helm, DeWitt insisted that the diocese acknowledge and respond to the racism and discrimination in its midst. Troubled by riots in Philadelphia and Chester, he supported an ecumenical effort to desegregate Girard College, a boarding school for orphan boys that bore the name of its nineteenth-century benefactor. He even lent his support to the idea that the best way to atone for slavery was through "reparations."

DeWitt's successor, Lyman L. Ogilby (1974–1988), inherited a diocese that was certainly more attuned to issues of inequality and social justice than it once had been. This new sensitivity manifested itself in July 1974 when the first women to become Episcopal priests were ordained in Philadelphia. The ceremony took place at the Church of the Advocate whose rector, Paul M. Washington, was also an important civil rights leader. Ogilby did not participate, but neither did he stand in the way. By then, laywomen had begun to play a significant role in the church, serving on vestries and as delegates to the diocesan conventions. In 1986, St. Giles, Upper Darby became the first parish in the diocese to call a woman, Michealla Keener, to be its rector.

The place of gays and lesbians in the diocese remained unresolved until the episcopacy of Allen L. Bartlett, Jr. (1988–1998). After prayerful consideration, he opened the door to the diaconate and the priesthood for openly gay men and women. But such reforms did not come without recrimination. Some priests and parishes withdrew from the diocese or invited bishops from outside its borders to make pastoral visits. Bartlett tolerated these so-called "flying bishops," but his successor, Charles Bennison (1998–2012), did not.

=== 21st century ===
Following Bishop Bennison's departure, the diocese turned for leadership to Clifton Daniel, 3rd (2013–2016). The bishop of the Episcopal Diocese of East Carolina, beginning in 1997, came to Pennsylvania on a provisional basis and kept the diocese on a steady course while it made plans to search for a permanent successor. Completed in 2016, that search led to the selection of Daniel G. P. Gutiérrez, canon to the ordinary in the Episcopal Diocese of the Rio Grande, as the sixteenth bishop of the Episcopal Diocese of Pennsylvania.

== Cathedral ==
During the early 20th Century as the more wealthy population of the diocese was shifting west toward the Philadelphia Main Line, a project was undertaken to build Cathedral Church of Christ, on Ridge Avenue in the Roxborough section of the city, but construction on the cathedral project was halted decades ago for financial reasons. A cathedral was also envisioned as part of the Washington Memorial Chapel complex at Valley Forge, but did not get much further than the laying of a cornerstone.

When Allen L. Bartlett, Jr. became Bishop of the Diocese of Pennsylvania in 1987, a cathedral was high on his list of goals, stemming from his years of experience as Dean of the Cathedral in Louisville, Kentucky. In December 1990, he asked the Cathedral Chapter to consider a number of possible sites but also recommended that the Church of the Saviour in West Philadelphia be chosen. He gave several reasons: the building's size, its location in a multi-cultural and educational environment, and the fact that it was already a popular site for diocesan events. The Chapter agreed, as did all other decision-making bodies of the Diocese. An agreement was reached between the parish's vestry and the Chapter in October 1991, and the church was officially designated the Cathedral Church of the Saviour on January 1, 1992.

In 2002, a comprehensive renovation of the Cathedral's interior was completed under the direction of Dean Richard Giles. The original building by Charles W. Burns, Jr. was a basilica in shape, though not in internal layout, and the renovation sought to remedy this. The basilica was the first form of Christian building, adapted from the public assembly hall of the Roman Empire. The Cathedral interior, now seen at the 19th South 38th Street property in West Philadelphia, replicates the layout of a place of Christian worship in the 5th century.

In 2019, after 200 years based in the city of Philadelphia, the diocese moved its headquarters to Norristown reviving a previously closed church there.

== Bishops of Pennsylvania ==
These are the bishops who have served the Diocese of Pennsylvania:

1. William White (1787–1836)
  * Henry U. Onderdonk, Bishop Coadjutor (1827–1836)
2. Henry U. Onderdonk (1836–1844)
3. Alonzo Potter (1845–1865)
  * Samuel Bowman, Bishop Suffragan (1858–1861)
  * William B. Stevens, Bishop Coadjutor (1862–1865)
4. William B. Stevens (1865–1887)
  * Ozi W. Whitaker, Bishop Coadjutor (1886–1887)
5. Ozi W. Whitaker (1887–1911)
  * Alexander Mackay-Smith, Bishop Coadjutor (1902–1911)
6. Alexander Mackay-Smith (1911)
  * Philip M. Rhinelander, Bishop Coadjutor (1911)
7. Philip M. Rhinelander (1911–1923)
  * Thomas J. Garland, Bishop Suffragan (elected 1911)
8. Thomas J. Garland (1924–1931)
  * Francis Marion Taitt, Bishop Coadjutor (1929–1931)
9. Francis Marion Taitt (1931–1943)
  * Oliver J. Hart, Bishop Coadjutor (1942–1943)
10. Oliver J. Hart (1943–1963)
  * William P. Remington, Bishop Suffragan (1945–1961)
  * J. Gillespie Armstrong, Bishop Suffragan (1949, Bishop Coadjutor (1960–1963)
11. J. Gillespie Armstrong (1963–1964)
  * Robert L. DeWitt, Bishop Coadjutor (1964)
12. Robert L. DeWitt (1964–1973)
  * Lyman C. Ogilby, Bishop Coadjutor (1973)
13. Lyman C. Ogilby (1974–1987)
  * Allen L. Bartlett, Jr., Bishop Coadjutor (1986)
14. Allen L. Bartlett, Jr. (1987–1998)
  * Franklin D. Turner, Bishop Suffragan (1988–2000)
15. Charles Ellsworth Bennison, Jr. (1998–2012)
  * Clarence N. Coleridge (Assisting)
  * Clifton D. Daniel, III, Provisional Bishop (2013–2016)
  * Allen L. Bartlett (Assisting)
  * Edward Lewis Lee (Assisting)
  * Rodney R. Michel (Assisting)
16. Daniel G. P. Gutierrez, (2016–Present)

== See also ==
- List of bishops of the Episcopal Church in the United States of America
