= Historical list of bishops of the Episcopal Church in the United States of America =

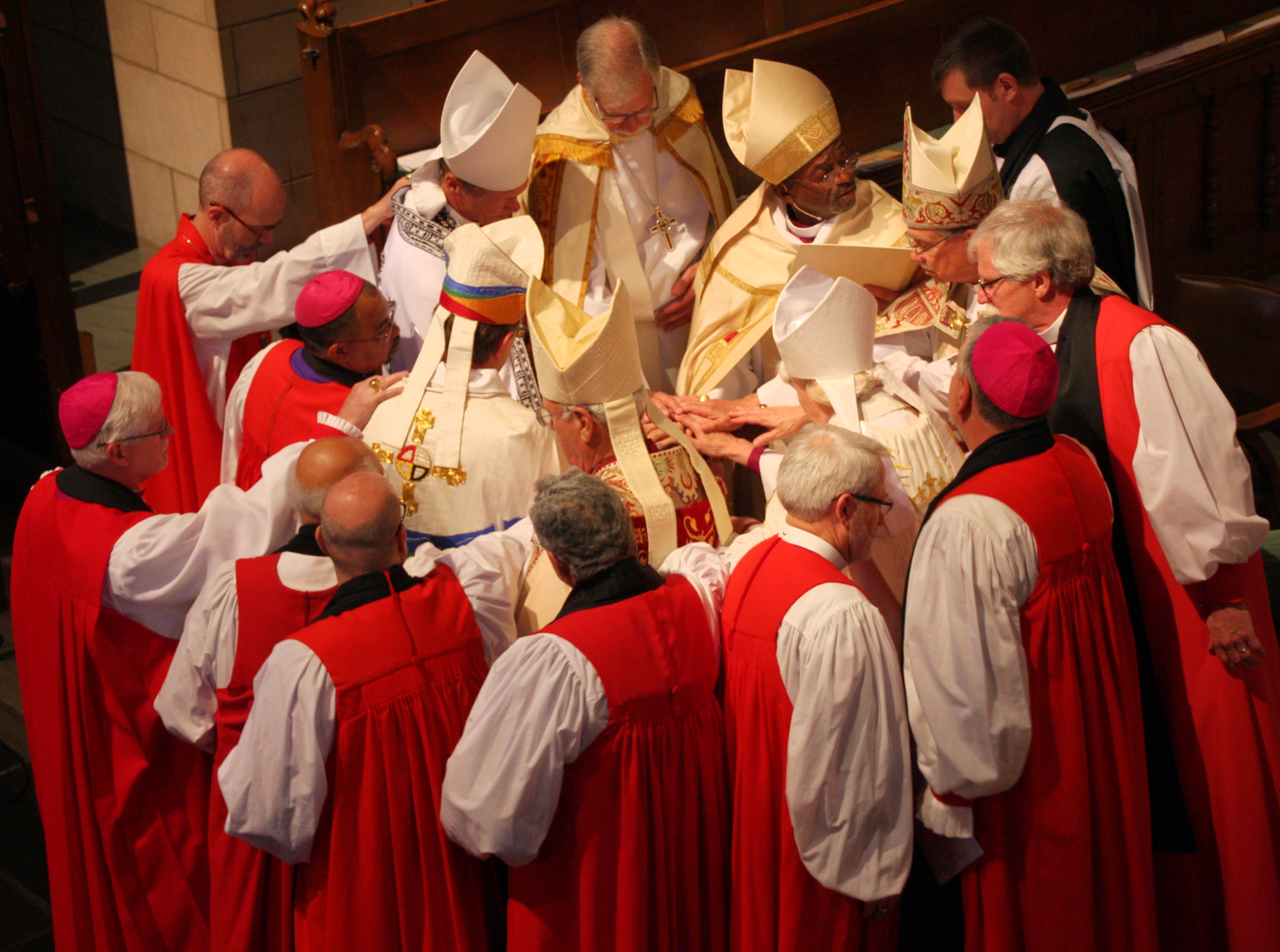
The consecration of a bishop in the Episcopal Church by the laying on of hands of bishops

This list consists of the bishops in the Episcopal Church, an independent province of the Anglican Communion. This shows the historical succession of the episcopate within this church.

== Key to chart ==
The number references the sequence of consecration. Two capital letters before their number identify bishops consecrated for missionary work outside of the United States. "Diocese" refers to the diocese for which the individual was ordained; this does not mean it was the only diocese that bishop presided over. For example, the Diocese of Delaware was under the supervision of the Diocese of Pennsylvania under William White. "PB" refers to whether the bishop became a presiding bishop in the Episcopal Church and, if so, which number in the sequence.

Under consecrators, one finds numbers or letters referencing previous bishops on the list. If a series of letters is under "Consecrators", then the consecrators were bishops or archbishops from outside of the Episcopal Church:

- BAK = Gilbert Baker, Bishop of Hong Kong and Macao
- BAN = Chiu Ban It, Bishop of Singapore
- BOY = Laish Boyd, Bishop of the Bahamas, Turks and Caicos
- BRT = Tony Burton, Bishop of Saskatchewan
- CAB = Daniel Pina Cabral, Bishop of Lebombo
- CAS = William Cassels, Bishop of Western China
- CAR = George Carey, Archbishop of Canterbury
- COR = Nigel Cornwall, Bishop of Borneo
- DAC = Emelyn G. Dacuycuy, Bishop of Batac
- DAL = John Daly, Bishop in Korea
- DAR = Frederick Darwent, Bishop of Aberdeen and Orkney
- DER = Matthias Der, Bishop of Hong Kong Island
- ELA = Riah El-Assal, Bishop of Jerusalem
- FYF = Rollestone Fyffe, Bishop of Rangoon
- GOM = Ricardo Gomez Osnaya, Bishop of Western Mexico
- HAL = Ronald Hall, Bishop of Victoria, Hong Kong (1932–1951) & Bishop of Hong Kong and Macao (1951–1966)
- HIL = Fred Hiltz, Primate of the Anglican Church of Canada (2007-2019)
- HIN = John Hinchliffe, Bishop of Peterborough (1769–1794)
- HOL = John Holder, Archbishop of the West Indies (2009-2018)
- ISO = Andrew Haruhisa Iso, Bishop of Osaka
- JAA = Jenny Andison, Rector of St. Paul's, Bloor Street; former suffragan bishop, Diocese of Toronto
- KER = Greg Kerr-Wilson, Archbishop of Calgary and Metropolitan of Rupert's Land
- KIL = Robert Kilgour, Primus and Bishop of Aberdeen
- KIM = Elijah Jang-Whan Kim, Primate of Korea and Bishop of Seoul
- LEA = Arthur Lea, Bishop of Kyushu
- LYO = Frank Lyons, Bishop of Bolivia
- MAR = William Markham, Archbishop of York
- MAT = Carlos Matsinhe, Bishop of Lebombo
- MIL = Harold Miller, Bishop of Down and Dromore
- MMS = Melissa M. Skelton, IX Bishop of New Westminster
- MOL = Herbert Molony, Bishop of Chekiang
- MOO = John Moore, Archbishop of Canterbury
- MOS = Charles Moss, Bishop of Bath and Wells
- MOU = George Moule, Bishop of Mid-China
- NOR = Frank Norris, Bishop of North China
- PET = Arthur Petrie, Bishop of Moray and Ross
- POR = Beilby Porteus, Bishop of London
- ROB = Basil Roberts, Bishop of Singapore
- ROW = Francis Rowinski, Polish National Catholic bishop
- SCO = Charles Scott, Bishop of North China
- SHE = Victor George Shearburn, Bishop of Rangoon
- SHO = David Shoji Tani, Bishop of Okinawa
- SKI = John Skinner, bishop coadjutor of Aberdeen
- STE = Krister Stendahl, Bishop of Stockholm
- THO = John Thomas, Bishop of Rochester
- TSE = Lindel Tsen, Bishop of Honan
- UEM = Nathaniel Makoto Uematsu, Primate of The Nippon Sei Ko Kai and Bishop of Hokkaido
- VER = Joris Vercammen, Archbishop of Utrecht
- VIC = Victoria Matthews, Bishop of Christchurch, retired
- WIL = Cornelius Wilson, Bishop of Costa Rica
- ZIE = Thaddeus F. Zielinski, Polish National Catholic bishop

== Chart of bishop succession ==
- Presiding bishop
- Diocesan bishop (Ordinary)
- Suffragan bishop
- Coadjutor bishop
- Provisional bishop
- Assistant bishop
- Bishop pro tempore

The Roman numeral before the diocese name represents where in the sequence that bishop falls; e.g., the fourth bishop of Pennsylvania is written "IV Pennsylvania". Where a diocese is in bold type it indicates that the bishop is a current bishop of that diocese.

=== 1–100 ===
No.	Bishop	Consecrators	Year	Diocese	Notes
1	Samuel Seabury	KIL PET SKI	1784	I Connecticut, I Rhode Island	PB2
2	William White	MOO MAR MOS HIN	1787	I Pennsylvania	PB1 & PB4
3	Samuel Provoost	MOO MAR MOS HIN	1787	I New York	PB3
4	James Madison	MOO POR THO	1790	I Virginia	
5	Thomas John Clagett	3 1 2 4	1792	I Maryland	
6	Robert Smith	2 3 4 5	1795	I South Carolina	
7	Edward Bass	2 3 5	1797	I Massachusetts, II Rhode Island (Note: Bass also oversaw churches in New Hampshire and Maine.)	
8	Abraham Jarvis	2 3 7	1797	II Connecticut	
9	Benjamin Moore	2 5 8	1801	II New York	
10	Samuel Parker	2 5 8 9	1804	II Massachusetts	
11	John Henry Hobart	2 3 8	1811	III New York	
12	Alexander Viets Griswold	2 3 8	1811	Eastern Diocese (simultaneously III Massachusetts, III Rhode Island and I New Hampshire). (Note: Eastern Diocese included Vermont and Maine.)	(Note: Alexander Viets Griswold (12 & PB5), Sheldon Munson Griswold (213) and Frank T. Griswold (794 & PB25) are cousins through their ancestor Edward Griswold (1607–1690).) PB5
13	Theodore Dehon	2 8 11	1812	II South Carolina	
14	Richard Channing Moore	2 11 12 13	1814	II Virginia	
15	James Kemp	2 11 14	1814	Maryland (Suffragan), II Maryland	
16	John Croes	2 11 15	1815	I New Jersey	
17	Nathaniel Bowen	2 11 15 16	1818	III South Carolina	
18	Philander Chase	2 11 15 16	1819	I Ohio, I Illinois (Chicago)	(Note: Philander Chase (18 & PB6) was the principal consecrator of his fourth cousin Carlton Chase (42).) PB6
19	Thomas Church Brownell	2 11 12	1819	III Connecticut	PB7
20	John Stark Ravenscroft	2 12 15 16 17 19	1823	I North Carolina	
21	Henry U. Onderdonk	2 11 15	1827	II Pennsylvania	(Note: Henry U. Onderdonk (21) was a co-consecrator of his younger brother Benjamin T. Onderdonk (24). They were the first brothers to be Episcopal bishops. Calvin Schofield Jr. (728) is descended from the Onderdonk family.)
22	William Meade	2 11 12	1829	III Virginia	
23	William Murray Stone	2 14 21	1830	III Maryland	
24	Benjamin T. Onderdonk	2 19 21	1830	IV New York	
25	Levi Silliman Ives	2 21 24	1831	II North Carolina	
26	John Henry Hopkins	2 12 17	1832	I Vermont	PB8
27	Benjamin B. Smith	2 19 21	1832	I Kentucky	PB9
28	Charles Pettit McIlvaine	2 12 22	1832	II Ohio	
29	George Washington Doane	2 24 25	1832	II New Jersey	(Note: George Washington Doane (29) was the father of William Croswell Doane (92).)
30	James Hervey Otey	2 21 24	1834	I Tennessee, Arkansas (Provisional), Missionary, Mississippi and Indian Territory	
31	Jackson Kemper	2 14 18	1835	1st missionary bishop to Northwest, I Indiana (Indianapolis), Missionary, Missouri; Kansas, I Wisconsin (Milwaukee)	
32	Samuel A. McCoskry	21 29 31	1836	I Michigan	
33	Leonidas Polk	22 27 28	1838	Missionary to Southwest; I Arkansas, I Louisiana	
34	William H. DeLancey	12 21 24	1839	I Western New York	
35	Christopher Edwards Gadsden	12 29 32	1840	IV South Carolina	
36	William Rollinson Whittingham	12 14 24	1840	IV Maryland	
37	Stephen Elliott	22 25 35	1841	I Georgia	(Note: Stephen Elliott (37) was the father of Robert W. B. Elliott (106).) CSA-PB
38	Alfred Lee	12 14 18	1841	I Delaware	PB10
39	John Johns	12 22 25	1842	IV Virginia	
40	Manton Eastburn	12 19 24	1842	IV Massachusetts	
41	John Prentiss Kewley Henshaw	19 24 26	1843	IV Rhode Island	
42	Carlton Chase	18 19 24	1844	II New Hampshire	
43	Nicholas H. Cobbs	18 22 28	1844	I Alabama	
44	Cicero Stephens Hawks	18 31 32	1844	I Missouri	
45	William Jones Boone (father)	18 29 30	1844	1st overseas missionary bishop, I Shanghai	(Note: William Jones Boone, first Bishop of Shanghai (45) was the father of William Jones Boone, fourth Bishop of Shanghai (135).)
46	George W. Freeman	18 31 33	1844	Texas (Provisional), II Arkansas	
47	Horatio Southgate	18 36 37	1844	Missionary to the Syriac Orthodox Church (Mardin, Turkey)	
48	Alonzo Potter	18 19 29	1845	III Pennsylvania	(Note: Alonzo Potter (48) and Horatio Potter (62) were brothers; Alonzo was the father of Henry C. Potter (131).)
49	George Burgess	18 19 40	1847	I Maine	
50	George Upfold	27 28 31	1849	II Indiana (Indianapolis)	
51	William Mercer Green (grandfather)	30 33 43	1850	I Mississippi	(Note: William Mercer Green, first Bishop of Mississippi (51) was the grandfather of William Mercer Green, fourth Bishop of Mississippi (299).)
52	John Payne	22 38 39	1851	Missionary, Cape Palmas (I Liberia) (Note: First bishops were sent to the Missionary District of Cape Palmas and Parts Adjacent. The name of the jurisdiction was changed to the Missionary District of Liberia on October 17, 1913, and to the Episcopal Diocese of Liberia on January 1, 1970. On March 18, 1982, the diocese joined the Church of the Province of West Africa.)	
53	Francis Huger Rutledge	35 37 43	1851	I Florida	
54	John Williams	19 26 34	1851	IV Connecticut, Mexico (Provisional)	PB11
55	Henry John Whitehouse	19 38 40	1851	II Illinois (Chicago)	
56	Jonathan Mayhew Wainwright	19 29 31	1852	New York (Provisional), V New York (Note: Numbering according to diocesan website. Other sources, including Episcopal Church Annual, list Wainwright as provisional only, with successors numbered one less than this list.)	
57	Thomas F. Davis	19 26 27	1853	V South Carolina	
58	Thomas Atkinson	19 28 29	1853	III North Carolina	
59	William Ingraham Kip	31 38 45	1853	Missionary, California; I California	
60	Thomas Fielding Scott	37 43 57	1854	Missionary, Oregon and Washington territories; (Note: Later to become dioceses of Oregon, Eastern Oregon, Spokane, Olympia, Idaho and western Montana.) I Oregon	
61	Henry W. Lee	26 32 34	1854	I Iowa, Kansas (Provisional)	
62	Horatio Potter	19 26 29	1854	New York (Provisional), VI New York	
63	Thomas M. Clark	19 26 29	1854	V Rhode Island	PB12
64	Samuel Bowman	31 34 38	1858	Pennsylvania (Suffragan)	
65	Alexander Gregg	26 27 30	1859	I Texas	
66	William Henry Odenheimer	22 32 36	1859	III New Jersey, I Northern New Jersey (Newark)	
67	Gregory T. Bedell	22 28 39	1859	III Ohio	
68	Henry Benjamin Whipple	31 34 43	1859	I Minnesota	
69	Henry C. Lay	22 28 33	1859	III Arkansas, I Easton	
70	Joseph C. Talbot	31 27 44	1860	Missionary, Northwest; III Indiana (Indianapolis)	
71	William Bacon Stevens	26 38 48	1862	IV Pennsylvania	
72	Richard Hooker Wilmer	22 37 39	1862	II Alabama	(Note: Richard Hooker Wilmer (72) was a co-consecrator of his first cousin Joseph Pere Bell Wilmer (80).)
73	Thomas Hubbard Vail	31 55 61	1864	I Kansas	
74	Arthur Cleveland Coxe	26 49 58	1865	II Western New York	
75	Charles Todd Quintard	26 49 58	1865	II Tennessee	
76	Robert Harper Clarkson	26 31 32	1865	Missionary, Nebraska, Dakota Territory; I Nebraska	
77	George M. Randall	26 27 40	1865	Missionary, Colorado and adjacent	
78	John Barrett Kerfoot	26 28 36	1866	I Pittsburgh	
79	Channing Moore Williams	26 38 39	1866	Missionary, II Shanghai and Japan	
80	Joseph Pere Bell Wilmer	26 51 72	1866	II Louisiana	
81	George David Cummins	26 27 61	1866	Kentucky (Assistant)	REC-PB1
82	William Edmond Armitage	31 32 61	1866	II Wisconsin (Milwaukee)	
83	Henry A. Neely	26 54 62	1867	II Maine	
84	Daniel S. Tuttle	26 62 66	1867	Missionary, I Montana, I Boise (Idaho), and I Utah, III Missouri	PB13
85	John F. Young	26 52 65	1867	II Florida	
86	John W. Beckwith	51 58 72	1868	II Georgia	
87	Francis McNeece Whittle	39 38 67	1868	V Virginia	
88	William Henry Augustus Bissell	32 54 62	1868	II Vermont	
89	Charles Franklin Robertson	27 32 39	1868	II Missouri	
90	Benjamin Wistar Morris	38 66 73	1868	Missionary, Oregon and Washington territories; II Oregon	
91	Abram Newkirk Littlejohn	62 39 66	1869	I Long Island	
92	William Croswell Doane	62 66 83	1869	I Albany	
93	Frederic Dan Huntington	27 40 62	1869	I Central New York	(Note: Frederic Dan Huntington (93) and Daniel Trumbull Huntington (259) are cousins through their ancestor Simon Huntingdon (d. 1663).)
94	Ozi William Whitaker	28 38 40	1869	Missionary, Nevada and Arizona; V Pennsylvania	
95	Henry Niles Pierce	51 55 72	1870	IV Arkansas	
96	William Woodruff Niles	27 54 83	1870	III New Hampshire	
97	William Pinkney	27 39 58	1870	V Maryland	
98	William Bell White Howe	27 36 57	1871	VI South Carolina	
99	Mark Antony De Wolfe Howe	27 28 38	1871	I Central Pennsylvania (now Bethlehem) (Note: Diocese of Pennsylvania was divided in 1871, with the western portion named Diocese of Central Pennsylvania and Reading made the see city. The see was moved to Bethlehem in 1890. In 1904, the diocese was divided, with the eastern part keeping the name Central Pennsylvania and the western half taking the name Diocese of Harrisburg. The eastern diocese changed its name to Bethlehem in 1909, and Harrisburg changed its name to Central Pennsylvania beginning in 1972. Therefore, the original and current dioceses of Central Pennsylvania are not in fact the same jurisdiction.)	
100	William Hobart Hare	27 38 54	1873	Missionary, Niobrara, Dakota; I South Dakota	

=== 101–200 ===
No.	Bishop	Consecrators	Year	Diocese	Notes
101	John Gottlieb Auer	27 38 52	1873	Missionary, Cape Palmas (II Liberia)	
102	Benjamin Henry Paddock	27 38 54	1873	V Massachusetts	(Note: Benjamin Henry Paddock (102) and John A. Paddock (127) were brothers; John was the father of Robert L. Paddock (235).)
103	Theodore B. Lyman	36 58 69	1873	IV North Carolina	
104	John Franklin Spalding	32 67 70	1873	Missionary, Colorado; I Colorado	
105	Edward R. Welles (grandfather)	27 54 58	1874	III Wisconsin/Milwaukee (Note: The name of the Wisconsin diocese was changed to Milwaukee on June 16, 1886 – during the elder Edward R. Welles' tenure.)	
106	Robert W. B. Elliott	65 72 75	1874	Missionary, I Western Texas	
MH1	James Theodore Holly	27 38 62	1874	I Haiti	
107	John Henry Ducachet Wingfield	39 58 69	1874	Missionary, I Northern California	
108	Alexander Charles Garrett	76 84 100	1874	Missionary, Northern Texas; I Dallas	PB14
109	William Forbes Adams	51 80 86	1875	Missionary, Arizona and New Mexico; II Easton	
110	Thomas Underwood Dudley	27 39 71	1875	II Kentucky	
111	John Scarborough	62 71 78	1875	IV New Jersey	(Note: John Scarborough (111) was the principal consecrator for his son-in-law Edward J. Knight (236).)
112	George D. Gillespie	32 70 88	1875	I Western Michigan	
113	Thomas Augustus Jaggar	27 38 62	1875	I Southern Ohio	
114	William Edward McLaren	32 67 68	1875	III Chicago	
115	John Henry Hobart Brown	62 88 92	1875	I Fond du Lac	
116	William Stevens Perry	71 74 78	1876	II Iowa	
117	Charles Clifton Penick	58 87 97	1877	Missionary, Cape Palmas (III Liberia)	(Note: Charles Clifton Penick (117) was the granduncle of Edwin A. Penick (322).)
118	Samuel Isaac Joseph Schereschewsky	27 62 67	1877	Missionary, III Shanghai	
119	Alexander Burgess	27 54 63	1878	I Quincy	
120	George William Peterkin	67 78 87	1878	I West Virginia	
121	George Franklin Seymour	62 66 69	1878	I Springfield	
MM1	H. Chauncey Riley	38 67 71	1879	Missionary, Mexico	
122	Samuel Smith Harris	72 70 76	1879	II Michigan	
123	Thomas A. Starkey	63 73 91	1880	II Northern New Jersey/Newark (Note: The name of Northern New Jersey diocese changed to Newark on May 19, 1886 – during Starkey's tenure.)	
124	John Nicholas Galleher	51 71 89	1880	III Louisiana	
125	George Kelly Dunlop	68 89 102	1880	Missionary, Arizona and New Mexico	
126	Leigh Raymond Brewer	93 84 88	1880	Missionary, Montana; II Montana	
127	John A. Paddock	27 38 62	1880	Missionary, Washington state (Olympia)	
128	Cortlandt Whitehead	71 67 99	1882	II Pittsburgh	
129	Hugh Miller Thompson	51 72 122	1883	II Mississippi	
130	David Buel Knickerbacker	74 89 103	1883	IV Indiana (Indianapolis)	
131	Henry C. Potter	27 54 63	1883	VII New York	
132	Alfred Magill Randolph	38 98 110	1883	Virginia (Coadjutor), I Southern Virginia	
133	William D. Walker	63 74 76	1883	III Western New York, I North Dakota	
134	Alfred A. Watson	51 83 98	1884	I East Carolina	
135	William Jones Boone (son)	79 MOU SCO	1884	Missionary, IV Shanghai	
136	Nelson Somerville Rulison	38 99 114	1884	II Central Pennsylvania (now Bethlehem)	
137	William Paret	38 71 99	1885	VI Maryland	
138	George Worthington	74 100 114	1885	II Nebraska	
139	Samuel David Ferguson	38 71 91	1885	Missionary, Cape Palmas (IV Liberia)	
140	Edwin Gardner Weed	75 98 106	1886	III Florida	
141	Mahlon Norris Gilbert	38 67 68	1886	Minnesota (Coadjutor)	
142	Elisha Smith Thomas	68 73 84	1887	II Kansas	
143	Ethelbert Talbot	68 73 84	1887	Missionary, I Wyoming, II Boise (Idaho), III Central Pennsylvania/Bethlehem (name changed 1909)	PB15
144	James S. Johnston	72 110 122	1888	Missionary, II Western Texas/West Texas (Note: Missionary District of Western Texas became the Diocese of West Texas in 1904.)	
145	Abiel Leonard	73 75 84	1888	Missionary, Utah and Nevada; II Utah, Western Colorado (administered)	
146	Leighton Coleman	99 94 109	1888	II Delaware	
147	Miles Kendrick	84 110 130	1889	Missionary, Arizona and New Mexico	
148	Boyd Vincent	104 110 117	1889	II Southern Ohio	
149	Cyrus F. Knight	114 116 119	1889	IV Milwaukee	
150	Charles Chapman Grafton	114 119 121	1889	II Fond du Lac	
151	William Andrew Leonard	54 68 92	1889	IV Ohio	
152	Thomas Frederick Davies (father)	54 68 84	1889	III Michigan	(Note: Thomas Frederick Davies, Bishop of Michigan (152) was the father of Thomas Frederick Davies, Bishop of Western Massachusetts (254).)
153	Anson Rogers Graves	84 100 119	1890	I The Platte (renamed Laramie, Kearney)	
154	William Ford Nichols	54 75 83	1890	II California	(Note: William Ford Nichols (154) was the father of John W. Nichols (387).)
155	Edward Robert Atwill	84 114 121	1890	I Kansas City (West Missouri)	
156	Henry Melville Jackson	72 98 120	1891	Alabama (Assistant)	
157	Davis Sessums	75 84 108	1891	IV Louisiana	
158	Phillips Brooks	54 63 68	1891	VI Massachusetts	
159	Isaac Lea Nicholson	114 94 109	1891	V Milwaukee	
160	Cleland Kinloch Nelson	75 98 103	1892	III Georgia, I Atlanta	
161	Charles R. Hale	116 121 133	1892	Springfield (Coadjutor)	
162	George Herbert Kinsolving	72 75 94	1892	II Texas	(Note: George Herbert Kinsolving (162) was a brother of Lucien Lee Kinsolving (MB1), who was the father of Arthur B. Kinsolving II (456), who was a co-consecrator for his second cousin, Charles J. Kinsolving III (525) (their mutual great-grandfather was George Washington Kinsolving).)
163	Lemuel H. Wells	54 83 90	1892	I Spokane	
164	William Crane Gray	75 110 140	1892	Missionary, Southern Florida (Note: Episcopal Diocese of South Florida (originally constituted as Southern Florida) was divided in 1969 into the dioceses of Central Florida, Southeast Florida, and Southwest Florida. South Florida's bishops are listed as predecessor bishops to all three.)	(Note: William Crane Gray (164) was the father of Campbell Gray (342), who was himself the father of Francis Campbell Gray (815).)
165	Francis Key Brooke	84 95 104	1892	Missionary, Oklahoma and Indian Territory	
166	William Morris Barker	90 104 114	1893	I Western Colorado; Missionary, Washington state (Olympia)	
167	John McKim	91 103 110	1893	Missionary, I North Tokyo (North Kwanto)	
168	Frederick R. Graves	91 103 110	1893	Missionary, V Shanghai, Northern California (interim)	
169	Ellison Capers	103 134 140	1893	VII South Carolina	(Note: Ellison Capers (169) was the son of Methodist bishop William Capers and the father of William T. Capers (270).)
170	Thomas F. Gailor	75 110 116	1893	III Tennessee	
171	William Lawrence	54 63 83	1893	VII Massachusetts	(Note: William Lawrence (171) was the father and primary consecrator of William Appleton Lawrence (398), who was a co-consecrator of his own brother Frederic C. Lawrence (547).)
172	Joseph Blount Cheshire	103 134 169	1893	V North Carolina	
173	Arthur Crawshay Alliston Hall	83 96 146	1894	III Vermont	
174	John B. Newton	87 110 120	1894	Virginia (Coadjutor)	
175	John H. White	84 114 128	1895	V Indiana (Indianapolis), I Michigan City (Northern Indiana)	
176	Frank Rosebrook Millspaugh	68 84 104	1895	III Kansas	
177	Peter Trimble Rowe	92 94 123	1895	I Alaska	
178	Lewis W. Burton	110 120 132	1896	I Lexington	
179	Joseph H. Johnson	152 138 143	1896	I Los Angeles	
180	Henry Y. Satterlee	74 93 110	1896	I Washington	
181	G. Mott Williams	84 75 114	1897	I Marquette (Northern Michigan), Europe (Suffragan in charge)	
182	James Dow Morrison	92 93 111	1897	I Duluth	
183	Chauncey B. Brewster	91 92 94	1897	V Connecticut	(Note: Chauncey B. Brewster (183) was a co-consecrator for his brother Benjamin Brewster (242).)
184	Robert Atkinson Gibson	87 117 120	1897	VI Virginia	
185	William N. McVickar	92 94 113	1898	VI Rhode Island	
186	William Montgomery Brown	114 121 128	1898	V Arkansas	
187	Junius Horner	172 134 169	1898	Missionary, Asheville; I Western North Carolina	
MB1	Lucien Lee Kinsolving	110 92 111	1899	1st Missionary Bishop to Brazil (Southern Brazil)	
188	William Hall Moreland	154 145 147	1899	II Northern California	
189	Samuel Cook Edsall	114 121 133	1899	II North Dakota, II Minnesota	
190	Theodore N. Morrison	114 121 133	1899	III Iowa	
191	James Bowen Funsten	84 94 117	1899	III Boise/Idaho (Note: The name of the Boise missionary district changed to Idaho in 1907 – during Starkey's tenure.)	
192	Joseph Marshall Francis	114 121 152	1899	VI Indiana/Indianapolis (Note: The name of Indiana diocese changed to Indianapolis on September 1, 1902 – during Francis' tenure.)	
193	Arthur L. Williams	138 104 153	1899	III Nebraska	
194	William Loyall Gravatt	87 117 120	1899	II West Virginia	(Note: William Loyall Gravatt (194) was a co-consecrator for his nephew John J. Gravatt (417).)
195	Sidney Catlin Partridge	167 118 168	1900	Missionary, I Kyoto; II West Missouri	
196	Robert Codman	96 92 93	1900	III Maine	
197	Charles P. Anderson	114 112 121	1900	IV Chicago	PB17
198	Robert Woodward Barnwell	129 140 144	1900	III Alabama	
199	Reginald Heber Weller	150 114 159	1900	III Fond du Lac	
200	Frederick W. Taylor	121 150 159	1901	II Quincy	

=== 201–300 ===
No.	Bishop	Consecrators	Year	Diocese	Notes
201	Cameron Mann	84 143 155	1901	III North Dakota, Missionary, Southern Florida; I South Florida	(Note: Cameron Mann (201) was the primary consecrator for his brother Alexander Mann (329).)
202	Charles Brent	92 131 171	1901	Missionary, Philippines; (Note: Missionary District of the Philippine Islands in the United States of America was divided into three dioceses in 1972: Central, Northern and Southern. Northern Luzon was constituted in 1986 and North Central Philippines in 1989. In 1990, they formed the autonomous Episcopal Church in the Philippines.) IV Western New York	
203	Frederick W. Keator	114 100 159	1902	Missionary, I Olympia	
204	Frederick Burgess	131 92 111	1902	II Long Island	
205	James Addison Ingle	168 167 195	1902	Missionary, I Hankou	
206	Alexander Hamilton Vinton	152 93 173	1902	I Western Massachusetts	
207	Charles Sanford Olmstead	84 144 145	1902	II Colorado	
208	Alexander Mackay-Smith	92 111 128	1902	VI Pennsylvania	
209	James H. Van Buren	120 171 173	1902	I Puerto Rico (Note: Puerto Rico became a missionary district in 1901. In 1979, General Convention granted the diocese independence, making it extraprovincial to the Episcopal Church. It was admitted as a diocese in 2003.)	
210	Henry Bond Restarick	154 113 147	1902	Missionary, Honolulu (Hawaii)	
211	Charles Tyler Olmstead	93 96 131	1902	II Central New York	
212	Charles Minnigerode Beckwith	110 108 157	1902	IV Alabama	
213	Sheldon Munson Griswold	92 121 133	1903	Missionary Salina (Western Kansas); V Chicago	
214	Theodore DuBose Bratton	110 140 144	1903	III Mississippi	
215	Edwin S. Lines	84 92 111	1903	III Newark	
216	M. Edward Fawcett	84 121 150	1904	III Quincy	
217	David H. Greer	131 92 94	1904	VIII New York	
218	Richard H. Nelson	92 94 133	1904	II Albany	
219	Edward William Osborne	121 131 150	1904	II Springfield	
220	Robert Strange (bishop)	169 132 172	1904	II East Carolina	
221	Logan H. Roots	168 167 171	1904	Missionary, II Hankou	
222	Franklin S. Spalding	84 94 111	1904	III Utah	
223	Henry D. Aves	108 144 157	1904	Missionary, Mexico	
224	Albion W. Knight	84 140 157	1904	I Cuba, New Jersey (Coadjutor)	
225	Charles E. Woodcock	84 121 138	1905	III Kentucky	
226	James Henry Darlington	94 121 128	1905	IV Harrisburg (now Central Pennsylvania)	
227	Frederick Foote Johnson	84 94 113	1905	II South Dakota, IV Missouri	
228	Charles D. Williams	84 113 148	1906	IV Michigan	
229	Edward M. Parker	96 171 173	1906	IV New Hampshire	
230	John N. McCormick	84 112 160	1906	II Western Michigan	
231	William Walter Webb	159 150 175	1906	VI Milwaukee	
232	Charles Scadding	84 121 128	1906	III Oregon	
233	Beverley D. Tucker	132 120 172	1906	II Southern Virginia	(Note: Beverley D. Tucker (233) was the father of Henry St. George Tucker (258 & PB19) and Beverley Dandridge Tucker (409). Henry was the primary consecrator for his brother.)
234	William A. Guerry	84 140 170	1907	VIII South Carolina	
235	Robert L. Paddock	84 131 180	1907	Missionary, I Eastern Oregon	
236	Edward J. Knight	111 143 208	1907	II Western Colorado	
237	Henry Douglas Robinson	84 150 189	1908	Missionary, Nevada	
238	Frederick F. Reese	160 140 170	1908	IV Georgia	
239	Frederick Joseph Kinsman	84 94 96	1908	III Delaware	
240	Alfred Harding	84 109 111	1909	II Washington	
241	Nathaniel S. Thomas	84 94 111	1909	II Wyoming	
242	Benjamin Brewster	84 154 183	1909	IV Maine, III Western Colorado	
243	John Gardner Murray	137 109 132	1909	VII Maryland	PB16
244	Arthur Selden Lloyd	84 120 132	1909	Virginia (Coadjutor), New York (Suffragan)	
245	George A. Beecher	84 108 153	1910	II Kearney (The Platte)	
246	Edward A. Temple	84 108 144	1910	Missionary, North Texas (Northwest Texas)	
247	James De Wolf Perry	84 126 171	1911	VII Rhode Island	PB18
248	Julius W. Atwood	171 173 183	1911	Missionary, Arizona	
249	Theodore Payne Thurston	84 126 165	1911	Missionary, Oklahoma and Indian Territory; I Eastern Oklahoma	
250	Louis Childs Sanford	154 179 188	1911	I San Joaquin	
251	Charles Sumner Burch	217 92 111	1911	IX New York	
252	Rogers Israel	128 143 148	1911	I Erie (Northwestern Pennsylvania)	
253	James Ridout Winchester	84 140 162	1911	VI Arkansas	(Note: James Ridout Winchester (253) was the grandfather of James Winchester Montgomery (587).)
254	Thomas Frederick Davies Jr. (son)	84 171 183	1911	II Western Massachusetts	
255	Philip M. Rhinelander	84 128 171	1911	VII Pennsylvania	
256	Thomas J. Garland	84 111 128	1911	VIII Pennsylvania	
257	William Edward Toll	84 151 175	1911	Chicago (Suffragan)	
258	Henry St. George Tucker	167 FYF LEA	1912	Missionary, II Kyoto; VIII Virginia	PB19
259	Daniel Trumbull Huntington	168 221 CAS MOL	1912	Missionary, I Anqing	
260	George Biller Jr.	84 126 165	1912	III South Dakota	
261	Harry S. Longley	84 190 193	1912	IV Iowa	
262	Frank A. McElwain	84 189 193	1912	III Minnesota	
263	William Farrar Weeks	173 218 229	1913	Vermont (Coadjutor)	
264	Theodore I. Reese	148 151 171	1913	III Southern Ohio	
265	Samuel G. Babcock	171 196 202	1913	Massachusetts (Suffragan)	
266	Charles B. Colmore	84 140 170	1913	II Puerto Rico, Dominican Republic (bishop in charge)	
267	John Poyntz Tyler	84 120 132	1914	IV North Dakota	
268	Frank du Moulin	151 128 148	1914	Ohio (Coadjutor)	
269	Frederick Bingham Howden	84 143 148	1914	Missionary, New Mexico and Southwest Texas	
270	William T. Capers	84 140 144	1914	III West Texas	
271	William Cabell Brown	84 132 184	1914	VII Virginia	
272	William F. Faber	84 126 151	1914	III Montana	
273	George Coolidge Hunting	84 154 179	1914	Missionary, Nevada	
274	Paul Jones	84 154 179	1914	IV Utah	
275	Thomas C. Darst	84 172 187	1915	III East Carolina	
276	Walter Taylor Sumner	197 151 175	1915	IV Oregon	
277	Hiram Richard Hulse	217 151 163	1915	II Cuba	
278	Paul Matthews	148 151 192	1915	V New Jersey	
279	Herman Page (father)	84 163 171	1915	II Spokane, IV Idaho, V Michigan, IV Northern Michigan (Provisional)	(Note: Herman Page, fourth Bishop of Northern Michigan (279) was the father of Herman Page, fifth Bishop of Northern Michigan (436). The son was chosen to follow his father as Bishop of Northern Michigan.)
280	George Y. Bliss	173 196 229	1915	Vermont (Coadjutor)	
281	Charles Fiske	84 199 211	1915	III Central New York	
282	Wilson R. Stearly	215 128 143	1915	IV Newark	
283	Edward Campion Acheson	183 171 215	1915	VI Connecticut	
284	James Wise	84 162 177	1916	IV Kansas	
285	Hugh L. Burleson	84 171 189	1916	IV South Dakota	
286	Irving P. Johnson	84 189 193	1917	III Colorado	
287	Frank H. Touret	84 270 272	1917	IV Western Colorado, V Idaho	
288	Granville Hudson Sherwood	84 190 193	1917	III Springfield	
289	Edwin Warren Saphore	84 162 195	1917	VII Arkansas	
290	Arthur C. Thomson	84 132 172	1917	III Southern Virginia	
291	Harry T. Moore	84 108 162	1917	II Dallas	
292	Henry J. Mikell	170 140 164	1917	II Atlanta	
293	William P. Remington	84 228 249	1918	South Dakota (Suffragan), II Eastern Oregon, Pennsylvania (Suffragan)	
294	John C. Sage	84 190 193	1918	Missionary, Salina (Western Kansas)	
295	Robert L. Harris	84 151 175	1918	II Marquette (Northern Michigan)	
296	Edward Thomas Demby	84 170 195	1918	Arkansas (Suffragan) (Note: Demby (296) and Delany (298) were appointed as suffragan bishops "for colored work.")	
297	Clinton S. Quin	84 223 225	1918	III Texas	
298	Henry Beard Delany	172 233 275	1918	North Carolina (Suffragan)	
299	William Mercer Green (grandson)	84 157 170	1919	IV Mississippi	
300	Ernest Vincent Shayler	203 163 272	1919	IV Nebraska	

=== 301–400 ===
No.	Bishop	Consecrators	Year	Diocese	Notes
301	Troy Beatty	84 170 253	1919	Tennessee (Coadjutor)	
302	Edward L. Parsons	154 179 188	1919	III California	
303	Walter H. Overs	84 226 252	1919	Missionary, V Liberia	
304	James Craik Morris	84 170 224	1920	I Central America and Panama Canal Zone, V Louisiana	
305	Frank Mosher	168 259 258	1920	Missionary, Philippines	
306	Robert Carter Jett	84 233 194	1920	I Southwestern Virginia	
307	Arthur W. Moulton	84 171 173	1920	V Utah	
308	George W. Davenport	84 233 151	1920	III Easton	
309	W. Bertrand Stevens	179 154 167	1920	II Los Angeles	
310	David Lincoln Ferris	202 128 173	1920	V Western New York, I Rochester	
311	Philip Cook	84 143 201	1920	IV Delaware	
312	Herbert H. H. Fox	84 184 262	1920	VI Idaho, IV Montana	
313	Granville G. Bennett	84 151 192	1920	II Duluth, VIII Rhode Island	
314	Robert H. Mize Sr.	84 213 245	1921	Missionary, Salina (Western Kansas)	(Note: Robert H. Mize (314) was the father of Bob Mize, Bishop of Damaraland. Bob was received into the Episcopal Church in 1970.)
315	Kirkman G. Finlay	234 172 238	1921	South Carolina (Coadjutor), I Upper South Carolina	
316	William T. Manning	84 148 171	1921	X New York	
317	Fred Ingley	84 286 128	1921	IV Colorado	
318	Theophilus Momolu Gardiner	84 170 244	1921	Missionary, Liberia (Suffragan)	
319	John Dominique LaMothe	84 243 233	1921	Missionary, Honolulu (Hawaii)	
320	John C. Ward	84 128 148	1921	II Erie (Northwestern Pennsylvania)	
321	Herbert Shipman	84 316 215	1921	New York (Suffragan)	
322	Edwin A. Penick	172 234 275	1922	VI North Carolina	
323	James M. Maxon	170 216 225	1922	IV Tennessee	
324	William G. McDowell	170 210 233	1922	V Alabama	
325	G. Ashton Oldham	218 151 316	1922	III Albany	
326	Charles Lewis Slattery	171 233 265	1922	VIII Massachusetts	
327	W. Blair Roberts	84 285 286	1922	V South Dakota	
328	Harry Roberts Carson	84 170 316	1923	Missionary, II Haiti, Dominican Republic (Note: Bishop of Haiti and in charge of the Dominican Republic, 1928-1934; Mission District of Haiti and the Dominican Republic, 1934; diocesan bishop, Dominican Republic, 1934-1940; mission district, 1940; bishop in charge, 1940-1943)	
329	Alexander Mann	201 171 215	1923	III Pittsburgh	
330	James E. Freeman	170 171 243	1923	III Washington	
331	Robert E. L. Strider	194 271 329	1923	III West Virginia	
332	Frank W. Sterrett	143 226 194	1923	IV Bethlehem	
MP1	Manuel Ferrando	170 316 244	1923	Puerto Rico (Suffragan)	
333	Charles S. Reifsnider	167 179 151	1924	II North Kwanto	
334	Edward M. Cross	262 261 330	1924	III Spokane	
335	John Chanler White	143 216 197	1924	IV Springfield	
336	Edward H. Coley	143 244 310	1924	IV Central New York	
337	Frank A. Juhan	143 253 315	1924	IV Florida	
338	Eugene Cecil Seaman	170 162 270	1925	Missionary, North Texas (Northwest Texas); Oklahoma (acting)	
339	Samuel B. Booth	173 229 247	1925	IV Vermont	
340	Alfred A. Gilman	168 259 221	1925	Missionary, III Hankou	
341	Warren L. Rogers	151 279 148	1925	V Ohio	
342	Campbell Gray	199 216 231	1925	II Northern Indiana	
343	Benjamin F. P. Ivins	231 199 213	1925	VII Milwaukee	
344	Simeon Arthur Huston	162 270 309	1925	II Olympia	
345	John D. Wing	201 238 170	1925	II South Florida	
346	Ernest M. Stires	143 243 316	1925	III Long Island	
347	Robert E. Campbell	143 170 303	1925	Missionary, VI Liberia	
348	William M. M. Thomas	143 172 MB1	1925	Southern Brazil	
349	Middleton S. Barnwell	143 170 212	1925	VII Idaho, V Georgia	
350	Walter Mitchell	243 278 248	1926	Missionary, Arizona	(Note: Walter Mitchell (350) was the primary consecrator for his brother Richard Bland Mitchell (412).)
351	Frank W. Creighton	243 218 256	1926	Mexico, Long Island (Suffragan), VI Michigan	(Note: Frank W. Creighton (351) was the father of William Creighton (564), who was himself the father of Michael W. Creighton (910).)
352	Shirley Hall Nichols	167 333 LEA (et al.)	1926	Missionary, III Kyoto, Salina (Western Kansas)	
353	John T. Dallas	243 173 171	1926	V New Hampshire	
354	Edward T. Helfenstein	243 194 233	1926	VIII Maryland	
355	Thomas Casady	243 190 245	1927	Missionary, Oklahoma and Indian Territory; I Oklahoma	
356	Albert Sidney Thomas	243 172 214	1928	IX South Carolina	
357	Norman S. Binsted	243 167 258	1928	Missionary, I Tohoku, III Philippines	
358	Thomas Jenkins	243 177 250	1928	Missionary, Nevada	
359	John Insley Blair Larned	243 177 250	1929	Long Island (Suffragan)	
360	Frank E. Wilson	243 170 197	1929	I Eau Claire	
361	Henry Pryor Almon Abbott	243 178 225	1929	II Lexington	
362	Francis M. Taitt	256 226 241	1929	IX Pennsylvania	
363	Harwood Sturtevant	199 213 231	1929	IV Fond du Lac	
364	Elmer N. Schmuck	197 238 241	1929	III Wyoming	
365	Cameron Josiah Davis	310 281 285	1930	VI Western New York	
366	S. Harrington Littell	285 167 210	1930	Missionary, Hawaii	
367	Hayward S. Ablewhite	285 230 279	1930	III Marquette/Northern Michigan (Note: The name of Marquette diocese changed to Northern Michigan on June 2, 1937 – during Ablewhite's tenure.)	
368	Henry W. Hobson	148 151 194	1930	IV Southern Ohio	
369	William Scarlett	148 227 248	1930	V Missouri	
370	Robert Burton Gooden	309 188 250	1930	Los Angeles (Suffragan)	(Note: Robert Burton Gooden (370) was a co-consecrator for his son Reginald H. Gooden (454).)
371	George Craig Stewart	247 213 225	1930	VI Chicago	
372	Henry Knox Sherrill	247 171 221	1930	IX Massachusetts	(Note: Henry Knox Sherrill (372 & PB20) was the principal consecrator of his son Edmund Sherrill (560).) PB20
373	Frederick D. Goodwin	258 194 244	1930	IX Virginia	
374	Charles Kendall Gilbert	247 224 244	1930	XI New York	
375	Robert N. Spencer	270 216 227	1930	III West Missouri	
376	Benjamin Tibbets Kemerer	269 230 262	1931	III Duluth, Minnesota (Suffragan)	
377	Hunter Wyatt-Brown	247 310 320	1931	V Harrisburg (now Central Pennsylvania)	(Note: Before c. 1940, Hunter Brown's (377) full name was Wyatt Hunter Brown (Sr.); his given name was Wyatt Brown (Sr.).)
378	Stephen E. Keeler	269 230 262	1931	IV Minnesota	
379	John Boyd Bentley	247 170 177	1931	II Alaska	
380	Efraín Salinas	247 170 244	1931	I Mexico	
381	Frederick G. Budlong	247 183 242	1931	VII Connecticut	
382	Frederick B. Bartlett	285 250 317	1931	V North Dakota, VIII Idaho	
383	Benjamin M. Washburn	247 224 244	1932	V Newark	
384	Ralph E. Urban	247 224 278	1932	New Jersey (Suffragan)	
385	Archie W. N. Porter	188 250 302	1933	III Northern California	
386	Robert E. Gribbin	247 322 275	1934	II Western North Carolina	
387	John W. Nichols	NOR 168 340	1934	Missionary, Shanghai (Suffragan)	
388	Theodore R. Ludlow	247 282 311	1936	Newark (Suffragan)	
389	Benjamin D. Dagwell	278 177 250	1936	V Oregon	
390	Leopold Kroll	247 244 316	1936	Missionary, VII Liberia	
391	Vedder Van Dyck	247 353 372	1936	V Vermont	
392	Bartel H. Reinheimer	247 281 310	1936	II Rochester	
393	Charles Clingman	247 178 225	1936	IV Kentucky	
394	Lewis Bliss Whittemore	247 230 342	1936	III Western Michigan	
395	Wallace J. Gardner	278 188 311	1936	VI New Jersey	
396	William Leopold Essex	247 192 261	1936	IV Quincy	
397	Winfred Hamlin Ziegler	371 177 245	1936	IV Wyoming	
398	William Appleton Lawrence	171 247 242	1937	III Western Massachusetts	
399	Harry Beal	309 250 370	1937	II Central America and Panama Canal Zone	
400	Douglass H. Atwill	378 261 262	1937	VI North Dakota	

=== 401–500 ===
No.	Bishop	Consecrators	Year	Diocese	Notes
401	Goodrich R. Fenner	284 270 286	1937	V Kansas	
402	William P. Roberts	NOR 168 ROB	1937	Missionary, VI Shanghai, Kiangsu, (Holy Catholic Church in China)	
403	Robert F. Wilner	305 333 HAL	1937	Missionary, Philippines (Suffragan)	
404	Raymond A. Heron	258 171 242	1938	Massachusetts (Suffragan)	
405	William A. Brown	258 275 306	1938	IV Southern Virginia	
406	Charles C. J. Carpenter	258 214 270	1938	VI Alabama	
407	Edmund P. Dandridge	258 214 266	1938	V Tennessee	
408	Henry D. Phillips	258 275 292	1938	II Southwestern Virginia	
409	Beverley Dandridge Tucker (son)	258 194 275	1938	VI Ohio	
410	Malcolm E. Peabody	258 248 307	1938	V Central New York	
411	Karl M. Block	302 309 358	1938	IV California	
412	Richard Bland Mitchell	350 214 289	1938	VIII Arkansas	
413	Richard A. Kirchhoffer	258 342 349	1939	VII Indianapolis	
414	Arthur R. McKinstry	258 309 320	1939	V Delaware	
415	Hugo Blankingship	258 266 328	1939	III Cuba	
416	Spence Burton	258 247 286	1939	Haiti (Suffragan), IX Bahamas (West Indies)	
417	John J. Gravatt	258 194 275	1939	II Upper South Carolina	
418	William McClelland	258 268 308	1939	IV Easton	
419	Henry H. Daniels	312 307 344	1939	V Montana	
420	Edwin J. Randall	258 177 262	1939	Chicago (Suffragan)	
421	Howard R. Brinker	258 245 300	1940	V Nebraska	
422	Athalicio T. Pithan	348 380 415	1940	Southern Brazil	
423	John Long Jackson	258 275 292	1940	VI Louisiana	
424	Walter H. Gray	258 247 381	1940	VIII Connecticut	
425	Lloyd R. Craighill	402 NOR TSE	1940	Missionary, II Anqing	
426	Wallace E. Conkling	258 347 395	1941	VII Chicago	
427	Oliver Leland Loring	258 247 391	1941	V Maine	(Note: Oliver Leland Loring (427) and Richard T. Loring (471) were brothers.)
428	Noble C. Powell	258 354 330	1941	IX Maryland	
429	James M. Stoney	258 406 412	1942	Missionary, New Mexico and Southwest Texas; I Rio Grande	
430	Frank A. Rhea	307 334 358	1942	IX Idaho	
431	James P. DeWolfe	258 316 346	1942	IV Long Island	
432	William F. Lewis	258 307 358	1942	Missionary, Nevada; IV Olympia	
433	W. Roy Mason	258 306 373	1942	Virginia (Suffragan)	
434	John M. Walker	258 337 412	1942	III Atlanta	
435	Oliver J. Hart	258 330 362	1942	X Pennsylvania	
436	Herman Page (son)	258 351 394	1942	V Northern Michigan	
437	Duncan M. Gray (father)	258 214 412	1943	V Mississippi	(Note: Duncan M. Gray (437) was the father of Duncan M. Gray Jr. (698), who was himself the father (and a co-consecrator) of Duncan M. Gray III (956).)
438	J. Thomas Heistand	258 332 435	1943	VI Harrisburg (now Central Pennsylvania)	(Note: J. Thomas Heistand (438) was a co-consecrator of his son Joseph T. Heistand (714).)
439	Edward Pinkney Wroth	258 329 331	1943	III Erie (Northwestern Pennsylvania)	
440	Everett H. Jones	258 401 414	1943	IV West Texas	
441	C. Alfred Voegeli	258 325 383	1943	III Haiti, Dominican Republic (in charge)	
442	Charles F. Boynton	266 343 395	1944	III Puerto Rico, New York (Suffragan)	
443	Sumner F. D. Walters	258 250 309	1944	II San Joaquin	
444	Harry S. Kennedy	258 317 350	1944	Missionary, Hawaii; I Taiwan	
445	Austin Pardue	258 365 421	1944	IV Pittsburgh	
446	Angus Dun	258 372 368	1944	IV Washington	
447	Thomas N. Carruthers	258 323 356	1944	X South Carolina	
448	Elwood L. Haines	258 406 423	1944	V Iowa	
449	William W. Horstick	258 363 420	1944	II Eau Claire	
450	Reginald Mallett	343 363 395	1944	III Northern Indiana	
451	Bravid W. Harris	258 405 322	1945	Missionary, VIII Liberia	
452	Conrad H. Gesner	258 327 378	1945	VI South Dakota	
453	Donald B. Aldrich	258 251 374	1945	Michigan (Coadjutor)	
454	Reginald H. Gooden	258 370 415	1945	III Central America and Panama Canal Zone/Panama and the Canal Zone (Note: Central America separated from Panama and the Canal Zone in 1956.)	
455	Henry I. Louttit	345 350 416	1945	III South Florida, I Central Florida	(Note: Henry I. Louttit, Bishop of South Florida and of Central Florida (455) was the father of Henry I. Louttit (Jr.), Bishop of Georgia (901).)
456	Arthur B. Kinsolving	258 350 409	1945	I Arizona	
457	Frederick L. Barry	258 325 346	1945	IV Albany	
458	C. Avery Mason	258 291 426	1945	III Dallas	
459	Alfred L. Banyard	258 383 395	1945	VII New Jersey	
460	Tom Wright	258 275 428	1945	IV East Carolina	
461	John E. Hines	258 297 411	1945	IV Texas	PB22
462	William R. Moody	258 393 368	1945	III Lexington	
463	Richard S. M. Emrich	258 262 351	1946	VII Michigan	
464	Harold E. Sawyer	258 320 410	1946	IV Erie (Northwestern Pennsylvania)	
465	Lane W. Barton	258 368 378	1946	III Eastern Oregon	
466	George H. Quarterman	258 355 401	1946	Missionary, North Texas; I Northwest Texas	
467	Stephen C. Clark	258 307 309	1946	VI Utah	
468	Norman B. Nash	372 353 398	1947	X Massachusetts	
469	Stephen F. Bayne Jr.	372 344 424	1947	III Olympia	
470	Harold L. Bowen	372 317 426	1947	V Colorado	
471	Richard T. Loring	372 335 426	1947	V Springfield	
472	Horace W. B. Donegan	372 374 468	1947	XII New York	
473	George P. Gunn	372 306 405	1948	V Southern Virginia	
474	Charles F. Hall	372 353 468	1948	VI New Hampshire	
475	Louis C. Melcher	372 407 417	1948	I Central Brazil (Rio de Janeiro)	
476	James Wilson Hunter	372 397 440	1948	V Wyoming	
477	Francis Eric Bloy	258 302 370	1948	III Los Angeles	
478	Lauriston L. Scaife	372 365 420	1948	VII Western New York	
479	William J. Gordon Jr.	372 322 379	1948	III Alaska, Michigan (Assistant)	
480	Russell S. Hubbard	343 335 445	1948	Michigan (Suffragan), IV Spokane	
481	Charles A. Clough	343 335 427	1948	VI Springfield	
482	Theodore N. Barth	372 323 407	1948	VI Tennessee	
483	M. George Henry	258 408 447	1948	III Western North Carolina	
484	E. Hamilton West	372 337 349	1948	V Florida	
485	Walter M. Higley	372 336 410	1948	VI Central New York	
486	Jonathan G. Sherman	372 394 431	1949	V Long Island	
487	Donald J. Campbell	372 302 477	1949	Los Angeles (Suffragan)	
488	Girault M. Jones	372 337 417	1949	VII Louisiana	
489	Randolph R. Claiborne Jr.	258 406 428	1949	Alabama (Suffragan), V Atlanta	
490	Robert F. Gibson Jr.	258 373 433	1949	X Virginia	
491	J. Gillespie Armstrong	372 293 435	1949	XI Pennsylvania	
492	Charles L. Street	372 343 426	1949	Chicago (Suffragan)	
493	Allen J. Miller	428 446 464	1949	V Easton	
494	Nelson M. Burroughs	258 368 408	1949	VII Ohio	
495	Egmont M. Krischke	475 379 422	1950	Southwestern Brazil	
496	Dudley S. Stark	372 368 378	1950	III Rochester	
497	Edward R. Welles II (grandson)	372 375 428	1950	IV West Missouri	
498	Gordon V. Smith	372 327 394	1950	VI Iowa	
499	Wilburn C. Campbell	258 331 373	1950	IV West Virginia	
500	Gerald F. Burrill	258 291 432	1950	Dallas (Suffragan), VIII Chicago	(Note: Gerald F. Burrill (500) was a consecrator for his son William G. Burrill (784).)

=== 501–600 ===
No.	Bishop	Consecrators	Year	Diocese	Notes
501	Henry H. Shires	372 370 411	1950	California (Suffragan)	
502	Richard H. Baker	372 322 428	1951	VII North Carolina	
503	Arthur C. Lichtenberger	372 340 369	1951	VI Missouri	PB21
504	Robert McConnell Hatch	372 381 424	1951	Connecticut (Suffragan), IV Western Massachusetts	
505	Richard S. Watson	372 307 430	1951	VII Utah	
506	A. Ervine Swift	372 379 442	1951	IV Puerto Rico, Honduras (bishop in charge)	
507	Richard R. Emery	372 378 400	1951	VII North Dakota	
508	David E. Richards	372 347 451	1951	Albany (Suffragan), I Central America, I Costa Rica, Honduras (bishop in charge)	
509	Martin J. Bram	455 458 416	1951	South Florida (Suffragan)	
510	Chilton Powell	372 355 421	1951	II Oklahoma	
511	John B. Walthour	372 322 435	1952	IV Atlanta	
512	Donald H. V. Hallock	343 426 363	1952	VIII Milwaukee	
513	Hamilton H. Kellogg	372 297 378	1952	V Minnesota	
514	William Crittenden	372 368 409	1952	V Erie (Northwestern Pennsylvania)	
515	Iveson B. Noland	488 412 437	1952	VIII Louisiana	
516	Lyman Ogilby	357 403 424	1953	Missionary, Philippines; South Dakota (Coadjutor), XIII Pennsylvania	
517	John Seville Higgins	372 313 378	1953	IX Rhode Island	
518	Frederick J. Warnecke	372 332 383	1953	V Bethlehem	
519	William H. Brady	363 481 343	1953	V Fond du Lac	
520	Leland Stark	372 378 383	1953	VI Newark	
521	George M. Murray	406 393 498	1953	VII Alabama, I Central Gulf Coast	
522	Dudley B. McNeil	372 394 470	1953	IV Western Michigan	
523	William S. Thomas	445 435 478	1953	Pittsburgh (Suffragan)	
524	Clarence Alfred Cole	322 417 447	1953	III Upper South Carolina	
525	Charles J. Kinsolving III	429 401 456	1953	II Rio Grande	
526	J. Brooke Mosley	372 368 414	1953	VI Delaware	
527	Charles G. Marmion	372 393 458	1954	V Kentucky	(Note: (Charles) Gresham Marmion Jr. (527) and William H. "Bill" Marmion (528) were brothers consecrated about one month apart.)
528	William H. Marmion	372 408 414	1954	III Southwestern Virginia	
529	Joseph Harte	500 297 510	1954	Dallas (Suffragan), II Arizona	
530	Joseph Minnis	470 421 449	1954	VI Colorado	
531	Archie Henry Crowley	372 436 468	1954	Michigan (Suffragan)	
532	Albert R. Stuart	372 347 488	1954	VI Georgia	
533	Anson Phelps Stokes	372 368 468	1954	XI Massachusetts	
534	John Vander Horst	372 407 482	1955	VII Tennessee	
535	Harry Lee Doll	372 373 428	1955	X Maryland	
536	Richard Earl Dicus	440 350 412	1955	West Texas (Suffragan)	
537	F. Percy Goddard	297 440 461	1955	Texas (Suffragan)	
538	Robert R. Brown	412 414 373	1955	IX Arkansas	
539	Arnold Lewis	372 337 484	1956	Missionary, Salina (Western Kansas); I Armed Services	
540	James W. F. Carman	372 389 293	1956	VI Oregon	
541	Earl Honaman	372 438 435	1956	Harrisburg (now Central Pennsylvania) (Suffragan)	
542	Plínio Lauer Simões	475 379 495	1956	Missionary Bishop of South-Western Brazil	
543	Edward C. Turner	401 470 421	1956	VI Kansas	
544	James Clements	372 297 461	1956	Texas (Suffragan)	
545	William Moses	372 455 345	1956	South Florida (Suffragan)	
546	Chandler Sterling	419 421 530	1956	VI Montana	
547	Frederic C. Lawrence	372 398 533	1956	Massachusetts (Suffragan)	
548	Norman L. Foote	372 430 449	1957	X Idaho	
549	John Craine	413 411 368	1957	VIII Indianapolis	
550	Clarence Haden	372 385 497	1957	IV Northern California	
551	José G. Saucedo	372 380 440	1958	I Cuernavaca	
552	Philip McNairy	372 368 513	1958	VI Minnesota	
553	John H. Esquirol	372 424 504	1958	IX Connecticut	
554	Daniel Corrigan	372 530 449	1958	Colorado (Suffragan)	
555	James Pike	372 302 472	1958	V California	
556	David Rose	372 473 405	1958	VI Southern Virginia	
557	Francis Lickfield	500 396 519	1958	V Quincy	
558	Donald MacAdie	383 520 503	1958	Newark (Suffragan)	
559	Roger Blanchard	372 368 484	1958	V Southern Ohio	
560	Edmund Sherrill	372 495 542	1959	Central Brazil (Rio de Janeiro), I Recife	
561	Allen W. Brown	503 457 410	1959	Albany (Suffragan), V Albany	
562	Benito Cabanban	516 444 SHE	1959	Missionary, V Philippines/Central Philippines	
563	George L. Cadigan	503 496 538	1959	VII Missouri	
564	William Creighton	503 446 480	1959	V Washington	
565	Richard Millard	503 432 443	1960	Europe (Suffragan in charge), California (Suffragan)	
566	William Wright	503 432 443	1960	Missionary, Nevada	
567	Charles E. Bennison Sr. (father)	503 394 470	1960	V Western Michigan	(Note: Charles E. Bennison, Bishop of Western Michigan (567) was the father of Charles E. Bennison, Bishop of Pennsylvania (927).)
568	Paul Kellogg	503 441 506	1960	I Dominican Republic	
569	J. Stuart Wetmore	503 472 478	1960	New York (Suffragan)	
570	Ivol Curtis	503 370 477	1960	Los Angeles (Suffragan), V Olympia	
571	Samuel B. Chilton	503 373 490	1960	Virginia (Suffragan)	
572	Thomas Fraser	503 373 502	1960	VIII North Carolina	
573	Robert L. DeWitt	503 446 468	1960	Michigan (Suffragan), XII Pennsylvania	
574	Edwin B. Thayer	530 470 498	1960	VII Colorado	
575	Gray Temple	503 424 427	1961	XI South Carolina	
576	Harvey Butterfield	503 424 427	1961	VI Vermont	
577	Russell T. Rauscher	503 421 510	1961	VI Nebraska	
578	Charles P. Gilson	503 444 402	1961	Missionary, Hawaii (Suffragan), Taiwan (Suffragan)	
579	Romualdo González-Agüeros	503 415 379	1961	IV Cuba	
580	Dillard Houston Brown Jr.	503 446 564	1961	Missionary, IX Liberia	
581	John Allin	503 488 437	1961	VI Mississippi	PB23
582	J. Warren Hutchens	424 427 553	1961	X Connecticut	
583	James Duncan	503 455 534	1961	South Florida (Suffragan), I Southeast Florida	
584	William L. Hargrave	503 455 424	1961	South Florida (Suffragan), I Southwest Florida	
585	Charles W. MacLean	431 472 486	1962	Long Island (Suffragan)	
586	William Evan Sanders	503 534 532	1962	VIII Tennessee, I East Tennessee	
587	James Montgomery	503 500 492	1962	IX Chicago	
588	Albert A. Chambers	503 472 450	1962	VII Springfield	
589	Theodore H. McCrea	503 458 500	1962	Dallas (Suffragan)	
590	John Burgess	503 526 446	1962	XII Massachusetts	
591	Edward G. Longid	503 516 533	1963	Missionary, Philippines (Suffragan); I Northern Philippines	(Note: Edward G. Longid (591) was a co-consecrator for his kinsman (probably son) and successor Robert Longid (777).)
592	Charles B. Persell Jr.	503 561 478	1963	Albany (Suffragan)	(Note: Charles B. Persell Jr. (592) was the father of William D. Persell (945).)
593	Cedric E. Mills	428 379 506	1963	I Virgin Islands	
594	George W. Barrett	472 496 554	1963	IV Rochester, Los Angeles (Assistant)	
595	Frederick Putnam	538 510 543	1963	Oklahoma (Suffragan), I Navajoland, Minnesota (Assistant)	
596	Walter C. Klein	405 500 549	1963	IV Northern Indiana	
597	John A. Pinckney	483 356 417	1963	IV Upper South Carolina	
598	Paul Moore Jr.	503 549 564	1964	Washington (Suffragan), XIII New York	
599	Leonardo Romero	503 551 506	1964	Mexico (Suffragan), I Northern Mexico, El Salvador	
600	Melchor Saucedo	503 551 506	1964	Western Mexico	

=== 601–700 ===
No.	Bishop	Consecrators	Year	Diocese	Notes
601	George Rath	503 472 520	1964	VII Newark	
602	Ned Cole	503 410 485	1964	VII Central New York	
603	David Reed	503 454 529	1964	I Colombia, VI Kentucky	
604	Scott Bailey	461 466 537	1964	Texas (Suffragan), VI West Texas	
605	Kim Myers	549 463 531	1964	Michigan (Suffragan), VI California	
606	Robert C. Rusack	477 370 570	1964	IV Los Angeles	
607	George Selway	549 529 436	1964	VI Northern Michigan	
608	Francisco Reus-Froylan	503 506 442	1964	V Puerto Rico	
609	James C. L. Wong	HAL COR DAL	1960	II Taiwan	
610	George T. Masuda	452 476 546	1965	VIII North Dakota, Washington (Assistant)	
611	J. Milton Richardson	461 604 537	1965	V Texas	
612	Hal R. Gross	461 540 550	1966	Oregon (Suffragan)	
613	William Davidson	461 466 610	1966	Missionary, Salina; I Western Kansas, Ohio (Assistant), Colorado (Assistant)	
614	Albert W. Van Duzer	461 459 486	1966	VIII New Jersey	
615	William F. Gates Jr.	461 534 586	1966	Tennessee (Suffragan)	
616	William Paul Barnds	461 458 589	1966	Dallas (Suffragan)	
617	Dean T. Stevenson	461 438 518	1966	VII Harrisburg/Central Pennsylvania (diocese's name changed 1971)	
618	Robert Bruce Hall	461 490 500	1966	XI Virginia	
619	George A. Taylor	461 493 414	1967	VI Easton	
620	Richard Beamon Martin	461 486 478	1967	Long Island (Suffragan)	
621	John H. Burt	461 494 409	1967	VIII Ohio	
622	W. Moultrie Moore, Jr.	532 572 502	1967	North Carolina (Suffragan), VII Easton	
623	John Wyatt	461 529 605	1967	V Spokane	
624	Robert R. Spears Jr.	461 472 597	1967	West Missouri (Suffragan), V Rochester	
625	Milton L. Wood	461 406 489	1967	Atlanta (Suffragan)	
626	Christoph Keller Jr.	461 581 538	1967	X Arkansas	
627	William Frey	461 508 608	1967	Guatemala, El Salvador, Honduras (bishop in charge), VIII Colorado, Rio Grande (Assistant)	
628	Edward McNair	461 477 550	1968	Northern California (Suffragan)	
629	Lani Hanchett	461 444 540	1967	I Hawaii	
630	Edmond L. Browning	461 ROW 444	1968	Missionary, Micronesia; I Okinawa, Europe (Suffragan in charge), II Hawaii	PB24
631	Robert Appleyard	461 445 523	1968	V Pittsburgh	
632	Harold B. Robinson	461 478 ZIE	1968	VIII Western New York	
633	Harold Gosnell	461 440 494	1968	V West Texas	
634	Jackson Earle Gilliam	461 521 546	1968	VII Montana, Hawaii (Assistant)	
635	Victor Rivera	461 443 570	1968	III San Joaquin	
636	Hunley A. Elebash	461 460 484	1968	V East Carolina	
637	Frederick Wolf	461 424 517	1968	VI Maine	
638	William H. Mead	461 414 526	1968	VII Delaware	
639	David Leighton	461 535 523	1968	XI Maryland	
640	G. Edward Haynsworth	608 508 510	1969	Nicaragua, El Salvador, South Carolina (Assistant)	
641	José Ramos	461 608 508	1969	II Costa Rica	(Note: José Ramos (641) preached at the consecration of his brother Wilfrido Ramos-Orench (960).)
642	Constancio Manguramas	562 591 630	1969	Missionary, Philippines (Suffragan), I Southern Philippines	
643	William B. Spofford	461 548 465	1969	IV Eastern Oregon, Washington (Assistant)	
644	David Thornberry	461 368 476	1969	VI Wyoming	
645	Stanley Atkins	449 512 519	1969	III Eau Claire	
646	Paul Reeves	532 455 Nassau	1969	VII Georgia	
647	Philip Smith	461 490 618	1970	Virginia (Suffragan), VII New Hampshire	
648	William H. Folwell	455 583 646	1970	II Central Florida	
649	Addison Hosea	462 527 488	1970	IV Lexington	
650	Donald Davies	461 577 581	1970	IV Dallas, I Fort Worth, Europe (Suffragan in charge)	
651	Walter H. Jones	498 452 610	1970	VII South Dakota	
652	George Browne	461 520 441	1970	Missionary, X Liberia, Archbishop of West Africa	
653	Alexander Doig Stewart	461 590 504	1970	V Western Massachusetts	
654	Lloyd E. Gressle	461 526 518	1970	VI Bethlehem	
655	James Pong	461 BAK BAN	1971	III Taiwan	
656	Clarence E. Hobgood	461 539 572	1971	II Armed Services	
657	Adrián D. Cáceres	461 627 600	1971	I Central Ecuador	
658	Bill Stough	461 521 581	1971	VIII Alabama	
659	John McGill Krumm	461 474 559	1971	VI Southern Ohio	
660	Luc Garnier	461 527 620	1971	IV Haiti	
661	Robert Varley	461 577 619	1971	VII Nebraska	
662	Arthur A. Vogel	461 497 512	1971	V West Missouri	
663	Willis R. Henton	461 466 599	1971	II Northwest Texas, I Western Louisiana	
664	John T. Walker	461 564 590	1971	VI Washington	
665	E. Otis Charles	461 505 582	1971	VIII Utah; Dean, Episcopal Divinity School	
666	Frederick H. Belden	461 517 561	1971	X Rhode Island	
667	H. Coleman McGehee Jr.	461 490 463	1971	VIII Michigan	
668	Morgan Porteus	461 582 424	1971	XI Connecticut	
669	Richard M. Trelease Jr.	461 526 621	1971	III Rio Grande	
670	Harold Jones	461 452 651	1972	South Dakota (Suffragan)	(Note: Harold Jones was the first Native American bishop in the Episcopal Church.)
671	Walter C. Righter	461 474 498	1972	VII Iowa, Newark (Assistant)	
672	Morris F. Arnold	461 590 659	1972	Massachusetts (Suffragan)	
673	William A. Franklin	603 514 454	1972	II Colombia	
674	Albert W. Hillestad	461 588 637	1972	VIII Springfield	
675	Lemuel B. Shirley	454 603 584	1972	IV Panama	
676	Bennett Sims	461 489 613	1972	VI Atlanta	
677	Wesley Frensdorff	461 505 566	1972	I Nevada, Navajoland (interim), Arizona (Assistant)	
678	Telésforo A. Isaac	461 568 441	1972	II Dominican Republic, Southwest Florida (Assistant), Virgin Islands (interim)	
679	Samuel J. Wylie	461 472 659	1972	VII Northern Michigan	
680	Edward M. Turner	461 593 506	1972	II Virgin Islands	
681	Hanford L. King Jr.	461 548 651	1972	XI Idaho	
682	William C. R. Sheridan	461 587 ROW	1972	V Northern Indiana	
683	Quintin E. Primo Jr.	461 587 463	1972	Chicago (Suffragan), Delaware (interim)	
684	William J. Cox	461 639 535	1973	Maryland (Suffragan), Oklahoma (Assistant)	
685	George Moyer Alexander	461 521 583	1973	V Upper South Carolina	
686	Anselmo Carral-Solar	600 675 514	1973	Guatemala, Texas (Assistant)	
687	Robert P. Atkinson	461 499 586	1973	V West Virginia, Virginia (Assistant)	
688	John Alfred Baden	490 618 556	1973	Virginia (Suffragan)	
689	Charles T. Gaskell	461 512 645	1973	IX Milwaukee	
690	William G. Weinhauer	461 636 572	1973	IV Western North Carolina	
691	Donald J. Parsons	461 587 512	1973	VI Quincy	
692	Donald J. Davis	461 514 549	1973	VI Erie/Northwestern Pennsylvania (Note: The name of Erie diocese was changed to Northwestern Pennsylvania on November 14, 1981 – during Davis' tenure.)	
693	Matthew P. Bigliardi	540 612 570	1974	VII Oregon	
694	Harold Louis Wright	598 590 472	1974	New York (Suffragan)	
695	Wilbur Hogg	461 561 637	1974	VI Albany	
696	Robert S. Kerr	461 576 624	1974	VII Vermont	
697	Robert M. Wolterstorff	461 477 552	1974	I San Diego	
698	Duncan M. Gray Jr.	461 581 515	1974	VII Mississippi	
699	Frank S. Cerveny	461 543 484	1974	VI Florida	
700	David Cochran	581 479 610	1974	IV Alaska	

=== 701–800 ===
No.	Bishop	Consecrators	Year	Diocese	Notes
701	E. Paul Haynes	581 584 455	1974	II Southwest Florida	
702	G. P. Mellick Belshaw	581 614 444	1975	IX New Jersey	
703	Robert C. Witcher	581 486 515	1975	VI Long Island	
704	William A. Jones	581 563 614	1975	VIII Missouri	
705	William Hawley Clark	581 590 613	1975	VIII Delaware	
706	William Dimmick	581 534 582	1975	VIII Northern Michigan, Minnesota (Assistant), Alabama (Assistant)	
707	Richard Abellon	562 591 614	1975	II Northern Philippines, I Northern Luzon	
708	Robert Terwilliger	581 560 699	1975	Dallas (Suffragan)	
709	Robert H. Cochrane	581 570 677	1976	VI Olympia	
710	Roger Howard Cilley	581 611 537	1976	Texas (Suffragan)	
711	James Brown	581 488 454	1976	IX Louisiana	
712	Charles Vaché	581 556 564	1976	VII Southern Virginia, West Virginia (Assistant)	
713	John Shelby Spong	581 601 618	1976	VIII Newark	
714	Joseph T. Heistand	581 438 618	1976	III Arizona	
715	John Bowen Coburn	581 590 472	1976	XIII Massachusetts	
716	H. Irving Mayson	581 667 683	1976	Michigan (Suffragan)	
717	James D. Warner	581 519 543	1976	VIII Nebraska	
718	Gerald N. McAllister	581 613 633	1977	III Oklahoma	
719	Edward W. Jones	581 549 617	1977	IX Indianapolis	
720	Manuel C. Lumpias	562 707 655	1977	VI Central Philippines	
721	Bob Jones	581 644 479	1977	VII Wyoming	
722	Robert M. Anderson	581 552 665	1978	VII Minnesota, Los Angeles (Assistant)	
723	C. Judson Child Jr.	581 676 489	1978	VII Atlanta	
724	Charles L. Burgreen	581 539 633	1978	III Armed Services	
725	Hugo Pina-Lopez	581 675 648	1978	I Honduras, Central Florida (Assistant)	
726	John L. Thompson	581 550 635	1978	V Northern California	
727	Leigh A. Wallace Jr.	581 623 634	1979	VI Spokane	
728	Calvin Schofield Jr.	581 583 455	1979	II Southeast Florida	
729	Arthur Heath Light	581 528 516	1979	IV Southwestern Virginia	
730	Bernardo Merino Botero	581 675 657	1979	III Colombia	
731	Stanley F. Hauser	581 604 670	1979	West Texas (Suffragan)	
732	William E. Swing	581 605 664	1979	VII California	
733	William A. Beckham	581 685 586	1979	VI Upper South Carolina	
734	Walter Dennis	598 472 569	1979	New York (Suffragan)	
735	B. Sidney Sanders	581 460 636	1979	VI East Carolina	
736	Arthur E. Walmsley	581 668 637	1979	XII Connecticut	
737	William Black	581 368 659	1979	VII Southern Ohio	
738	Pui-Yeung Cheung	581 655 642	1980	IV Taiwan	
739	David H. Lewis Jr.	581 618 490	1980	Virginia (Suffragan)	
740	Harold A. Hopkins Jr.	581 610 637	1980	IX North Dakota	
741	Robert W. Estill	581 572 650	1980	IX North Carolina	
742	Roberto Martinez	581 551 600	1980	Central and South Mexico (Missionary suffragan, Hidalgo)	
743	Claro Huerta Ramos	581 551 600	1980	Central and South Mexico (Missionary suffragan, Vera Cruz)	
744	George N. Hunt III	581 732 517	1980	XI Rhode Island	
745	Rustin R. Kimsey	581 465 643	1980	V Eastern Oregon, Navajoland (Assistant), Alaska (Assistant)	
746	William L. Stevens	581 519 639	1980	VI Fond du Lac	
747	Maurice Benitez	581 461 604	1980	VI Texas	
748	Herbert A. Donovan Jr.	581 626 538	1980	XI Arkansas, Chicago (Provisional), Anglican observer at the United Nations, New Jersey (Assistant), New York (Assistant)	
749	C. FitzSimons Allison	581 575 685	1980	XII South Carolina	
750	William C. Wantland	581 645 718	1980	IV Eau Claire, Navajoland (interim)	
751	C. Shannon Mallory	Central Africa (Note: Mallory was consecrated Bishop of the Anglican Diocese of Botswana on January 1, 1972 in the Roman Catholic Cathedral of Christ the King in Gaborone by Paul Burrough, Bishop of Mashonaland and Dean of the Province of Central Africa, assisted by the Bishops of Matabeleland, Zululand, Bloemfontein and others. He resigned from Botswana in 1978 and from 1979 was Assistant Bishop in the Diocese of Long Island. He was accepted into full membership of the House of Bishops on his appointment to El Camino Real in 1980.)	1972	I El Camino Real	
752	Charlie F. McNutt	581 617 687	1980	VIII Central Pennsylvania (previously Harrisburg)	
753	Sam Byron Hulsey	581 466 663	1980	III Northwest Texas, Fort Worth (Assistant)	
754	William H. Wolfrum	581 627 574	1981	Colorado (Suffragan), Navajoland (interim)	
755	Charles F. Duvall	581 521 733	1981	II Central Gulf Coast	
756	O'Kelley Whitaker	581 602 648	1981	VIII Central New York, Southern Virginia (Assistant)	
757	John F. Ashby	581 718 750	1981	II Western Kansas	
758	Richard F. Grein	581 543 552	1981	VII Kansas, XIV New York	
759	George Clinton Harris	581 700 651	1981	V Alaska	
760	Henry B. Hucles III	581 703 486	1981	Long Island (Suffragan)	
761	Alden Hathaway	581 631 618	1981	VI Pittsburgh	
762	Samuel Espinoza Venegas	581 600 551	1981	Western Mexico	
763	Clarence Coleridge	581 736 DAR	1981	XIII Connecticut, Pennsylvania (Assistant)	
764	Bradford Hastings	581 736 DAR	1981	Connecticut (Suffragan)	
765	Armando Guerra	675 686 678	1982	I Guatemala	
766	Donald M. Hultstrand	581 689 719	1982	IX Springfield	
767	A. Theodore Eastman	581 639 535	1982	XII Maryland	
768	David Birney	581 654 681	1982	XII Idaho, Massachusetts (Assistant)	
769	Thomas K. Ray	581 567 706	1982	IX Northern Michigan, Iowa (Assistant)	
770	Gordon T. Charlton Jr.	581 747 650	1982	Texas (Suffragan)	
771	C. Brinkley Morton	581 697 658	1982	II San Diego	
772	Mark Dyer	581 654 590	1982	VII Bethlehem	
773	Alex D. Dickson	581 698 586	1983	I West Tennessee	
774	James R. Moodey	581 621 494	1983	IX Ohio	
775	Elliott L. Sorge	542 560 CAB	1971	I South Central Brazil (São Paulo), VIII Easton	
776	Donis D. Patterson	581 604 724	1983	V Dallas	
777	Robert Longid	707 591 720	1983	III Northern Philippines	
778	Harry W. Shipps	581 646 773	1984	VIII Georgia	
779	James Ottley	581 730 599	1984	V Panama, Anglican observer at the United Nations, Honduras (Assistant), Southeast Florida (Assistant)	
780	Leo Frade	581 711 765	1984	II Honduras, III Southeast Florida	
781	Vincent K. Pettit	581 702 734	1984	New Jersey (Suffragan)	
782	David S. Ball	581 508 695	1984	VII Albany	
783	Andrew F. Wissemann	581 782 504	1984	VI Western Massachusetts	
784	William G. Burrill	581 500 550	1984	VI Rochester, Arizona (Assistant)	
785	Peter James Lee	581 741 618	1984	XII Virginia, North Carolina (Assistant)	
786	Craig Anderson	581 452 634	1984	VIII South Dakota; Dean, General Theological Seminary; President, National Council of Churches; Rector, St. Paul's School	
787	Roger J. White	581 766 587	1984	X Milwaukee	
788	Edward C. Chalfant	581 559 659	1984	VII Maine	
789	Don Wimberly	581 749 699	1984	V Lexington, VIII Texas, Atlanta (Assistant)	
790	Howard Meeks	581 567 776	1984	VI Western Michigan	
791	Clarence C. Pope	581 645 711	1985	II Fort Worth	
792	Martiniano García Montiel	581 650 762	1985	South and Central Mexico (Suffragan), Cuernavaca, Litoral Ecuador (Administrator)	
793	Sturdie Downs	599 787 678	1985	I Nicaragua	
794	Frank T. Griswold	581 500 587	1985	X Chicago	PB25
795	Rogers Sanders Harris	581 733 773	1985	Upper South Carolina (Suffragan), III Southwest Florida, Lexington (Assistant)	
796	Frank Vest	581 741 572	1985	North Carolina (Suffragan), VIII Southern Virginia	
797	Oliver B. Garver Jr.	581 745 746	1985	Los Angeles (Suffragan)	
798	William Franklin Carr	581 687 499	1985	West Virginia (Suffragan), Upper South Carolina (Assistant)	
799	George Lazenby Reynolds	581 722 773	1985	IX Tennessee	
800	David Johnson	581 538 500	1985	XIV Massachusetts	

=== 801–900 ===
No.	Bishop	Consecrators	Year	Diocese	Notes
801	Robert L. Ladehoff	581 693 755	1985	VIII Oregon	
802	John H. MacNaughton	630 604 731	1986	VII West Texas	
803	Charles I. "Ci" Jones	630 634 603	1986	VIII Montana	
804	Allen L. Bartlett Jr.	630 516 603	1986	XIV Pennsylvania, Washington (Assistant)	
805	Douglas E. Theuner	630 647 736	1986	VIII New Hampshire	
806	Daniel L. Swenson	630 722 696	1986	VIII Vermont, Minnesota (Assistant)	
807	Narciso V. Ticobay	692 707 777	1986	II Southern Philippines	
808	Robert O. Miller	630 698 608	1986	IX Alabama	
809	Stewart C. Zabriskie	677 740 771	1986	II Nevada	
A810	Barry Valentine	Transferred (Note: "A" numbers are bishops consecrated outside the American episcopate, then transferred in as assistant bishop under Title III, Canon 12, Section 5 (Constitution and Canons, 2006))	1969	Rupert's Land (Canada), Maryland (Assistant)	
811	David Bowman	630 494 621	1986	IX Western New York, Central New York (Assistant), Ohio (Assistant)	
812	Arthur B. Williams Jr.	630 774 621	1986	Ohio (Suffragan), Ohio (Assistant)	
813	George E. Bates	677 745 643	1986	IX Utah	
814	Ronald H. Haines	630 664 690	1986	VII Washington	
815	Francis C. Gray	630 648 719	1986	VI Northern Indiana, Virginia (Assistant)	
816	Cabell Tennis	729 804 712	1986	IX Delaware, Spokane (Assistant)	
817	Donald P. Hart	630 479 647	1986	III Hawaii, Southern Virginia (Assistant)	
818	Frank Allan	630 723 676	1987	VIII Atlanta	
819	E. Don Taylor	630 632 680	1987	III Virgin Islands, New York (Assistant)	
820	German Martinez-Marquez	802 779 551	1987	I Northern Mexico	
821	Jeffery Rowthorn	630 657 736	1987	Connecticut (Suffragan), Europe (Suffragan in charge)	
822	Earl N. McArthur	630 802 718	1988	West Texas (Suffragan)	
823	Edward H. MacBurney	630 746 813	1988	VII Quincy	
824	Robert M. Moody	630 718 785	1988	IV Oklahoma	
825	John C. T. Chien	630 817	1988	V Taiwan	
826	Orris G. Walker	630 812 703	1988	VII Long Island	
827	Luis Caisapanta	779 692 657	1988	I Litoral Ecuador	
828	Frederick H. Borsch	630 702 664	1988	V Los Angeles	
829	Herbert Thompson Jr.	630 737 620	1988	VIII Southern Ohio	
830	Chris Epting	630 648 671	1988	VIII Iowa; Director of ecumenical relations; Chicago (Assistant)	
831	Franklin D. Turner	630 804 664	1988	Pennsylvania (Suffragan)	
832	John-David Schofield	630 635 732	1988	IV San Joaquin	
833	R. Stewart Wood	664 667 659	1988	IX Michigan	
834	Barbara Clementine Harris	630 800 804	1989	Massachusetts (Suffragan), Washington (Assistant)	
835	John C. Buchanan	630 755 622	1989	VI West Missouri, Texas (Assistant), Southern Virginia (Assistant), Quincy (Provisional)	
836	Terence Kelshaw	630 761 747	1989	IV Rio Grande	
837	Robert H. Johnson	630 690 723	1989	V Western North Carolina	
838	Sanford Z. K. Hampton	630 722 834	1989	Minnesota (Suffragan), Olympia (Assistant), Oregon (Assistant)	
839	John W. Howe	630 761 627	1989	III Central Florida	
840	Robert D. Rowley	630 692 772	1989	VII Northwestern Pennsylvania	
841	John H. Smith	630 690 774	1989	VI West Virginia	
842	Robert Jefferson Hargrove Jr.	630 663 711	1989	II Western Louisiana	
843	Vincent W. Warner Jr.	709 637 800	1989	VII Olympia	
844	Sergio Carranza	678 826 675	1989	I Mexico, Los Angeles (Assistant)	
845	William E. Sterling	630 747 686	1989	Texas (Suffragan)	
846	James E. Krotz	630 717 830	1989	IX Nebraska	
847	Edward L. Lee	719 769 516	1989	VII Western Michigan	
848	Charles L. Longest	630 639 767	1989	Maryland (Suffragan), Maryland (Assisting)	
849	Artemio M. Zabala	707 777 807	1989	I North Central Philippines	
850	Andrew H. Fairfield	630 610 740	1989	X North Dakota	
851	William E. Smalley	630 758 767	1989	VIII Kansas	
852	Edward L. Salmon Jr.	630 749 640	1990	XIII South Carolina	
853	Steven T. Plummer	630 670 595	1990	II Navajoland	
854	Charles L. Keyser	630 699 785	1990	IV Armed Services, Montana (Assistant), Georgia (Assistant), Florida (Assistant)	
855	Huntington Williams Jr.	630 741 676	1990	North Carolina (Suffragan)	
856	Neptalí Larrea Moreno	630 779 780	1990	II Central Ecuador	
857	John S. Thornton	658 745 801	1990	XIII Idaho, Spokane (Assistant)	
858	Richard L. Shimpfky	630 834 713	1990	II El Camino Real	
859	F. Jeffrey Terry	630 516 623	1990	VII Spokane	
860	W. Jerry Winterrowd	630 627 754	1991	IX Colorado	
861	Chester Talton	630 722 826	1991	Los Angeles (Suffragan)	
862	William W. Wiedrich	719 587 794	1991	Chicago (Suffragan)	
863	Hays H. Rockwell	630 758 704	1991	IX Missouri	
864	Victor A. Scantlebury	630 779 675	1991	Panama (Suffragan), Chicago (Assistant), Central Ecuador (Acting)	
865	Steven Charleston	630 853 750	1991	VI Alaska; Dean, Episcopal Divinity School	
866	Jack M. McKelvey	756 713 831	1991	Newark (Suffragan), VII Rochester	
867	Robert Tharp	630 648 586	1991	II East Tennessee, Atlanta (Assistant)	
868	Jerry Lamb	630 726 801	1991	VI Northern California, Nevada (Assistant), San Joaquin (Provisional)	
869	Alfred C. Marble Jr.	581 698 735	1991	VIII Mississippi, North Carolina (Assistant)	
870	Julio C. Holguin	856 779 678	1991	III Dominican Republic	
871	David B. Joslin	630 631 838	1991	IX Central New York, New Jersey (Assistant)	
872	Peter H. Beckwith	630 829 794	1991	X Springfield	
873	Martín Barahona	630 779 856	1992	I El Salvador, II Archbishop Church in Central America	
874	Gethin B. Hughes	630 828 842	1992	III San Diego	
875	Robert R. Shahan	630 529 714	1992	IV Arizona	
876	Jane Dixon	630 814 834	1992	Washington (Suffragan)	
877	Martin G. Townsend	630 775 772	1992	IX Easton	
878	Robert S. Denig	630 847 783	1993	VII Western Massachusetts	
879	James M. Stanton	630 828 832	1993	VI Dallas	(Note: Stanton retired on May 31, 2014.)
880	Jack Iker	630 791 659	1993	III Fort Worth	
881	Jean-Zaché Duracin	630 660 867	1993	V Haiti	
882	Bertram Herlong	630 785 752	1993	X Tennessee	
883	F. Clayton Matthews	630 785 687	1993	Virginia (Suffragan); Director, Office of Pastoral Development	
884	Claude E. Payne	630 461 581	1993	VII Texas	
885	James L. Jelinek	630 722 838	1993	VIII Minnesota	
886	Joe Morris Doss	630 732 780	1993	X New Jersey	
887	Mary Adelia McLeod	630 808 834	1993	IX Vermont	
888	James M. Coleman	630 711 773	1993	II West Tennessee	
889	James E. Folts	630 802 604	1994	VIII West Texas	(Note: James E. Folts (889), VIII Bishop of Western Texas, is the father and co-consecrator of Jonathan Folts (1123), XI Bishop of South Dakota.)
890	J. Clark Grew II	630 812 794	1994	X Ohio	
891	Edwin F. Gulick Jr.	630 796 883	1994	VII Kentucky, Fort Worth (Provisional), Virginia (Assistant)	
892	Stephen H. Jecko	630 699 661	1994	VII Florida, Dallas (Assistant)	
893	Robert C. Johnson Jr.	630 741 855	1994	X North Carolina	
894	Russell Jacobus	630 746 787	1994	VII Fond du Lac	
895	Larry Maze	630 698 748	1994	XII Arkansas	
896	Creighton L. Robertson	630 786 670	1994	IX South Dakota	
897	Keith Ackerman	630 691 823	1994	VIII Quincy	
898	M. Thomas Shaw	630 800 834	1994	XV Massachusetts	
899	Alfredo Morante	MP1 906a 856	1994	II Litoral Ecuador	
900	Kenneth L. Price Jr.	630 829 841	1994	Southern Ohio (Suffragan)	

=== 901–1000 ===
No.	Bishop	Consecrators	Year	Diocese	Notes
901	Henry I. Louttit (Jr.)	630 778 675	1995	IX Georgia	
902	Dorsey F. Henderson Jr.	630 583 746	1995	VII Upper South Carolina, Florida (Assistant)	
903	John L. Said	630 728 583	1995	Southeast Florida (Suffragan), Central Florida (Assistant)	
904	Vernon E. Strickland	630 721 830	1995	III Western Kansas, Wyoming (Assistant)	
905	Clarence W. Hayes	630 454 730	1995	VI Panama	
906a	Onell Soto	779 648 730 (Note: Soto was consecrated and installed as 2nd Bishop of Venezuela on July 11, 1987 in St. Mary's Cathedral, Caracas. James H. Ottley, Bishop of Panama and President of Province IX, presided at the ceremony. The co-consecrators were Orland U. Lindsay, primate of the West Indies; Olavo V. Luiz, primate of Brazil; and Haydn Jones, retired bishop of Venezuela.)	1987	II Venezuela, (Note: The Diocese of Trinidad and Tobago, founded in 1872, had jurisdiction over Venezuela until 1967, when a constitution for a new Diocese of Venezuela in the Province of the West Indies was agreed. Pending the appointment of the first Diocesan Bishop, episcopal oversight rested with Guy Marshall (Suffragan Bishop, Trinidad and Tobago) who served from 1967 to 1974. The first independent Bishop of Venezuela was Haydn Jones 1976-1986). The Diocese was for many years extra provincial to The Episcopal Church until its admission to Province IX at the 2006 General Convention.) Atlanta (Assistant), Alabama (Assistant)	
907	David Colin Jones	630 785 687	1995	Virginia (Suffragan)	
908	Leopoldo J. Alard	630 884 845	1995	Texas (Suffragan)	
909	Robert W. Ihloff	630 763 834	1995	XIII Maryland	
910	Michael W. Creighton	630 752 843	1995	IX Central Pennsylvania	
911	Robert B. Hibbs	630 889 802	1996	West Texas (Suffragan)	
912	Catherine S. Roskam	630 834 758	1996	New York (Suffragan)	
913	Geralyn Wolf	630 794 744	1996	XII Rhode Island, **Long Island** (Assistant)	
914	John Lipscomb	630 888 795	1996	IV Southwest Florida	
915	William J. Skilton	630 852 575	1996	South Carolina (Suffragan)	
916	Robert Duncan	630 761 785	1996	VII Pittsburgh	
917	Andrew Smith	630 763 736	1996	XIV Connecticut	
918	Carolyn Tanner Irish	630 813 665	1996	X Utah	
919	Paul V. Marshall	840 772 654	1996	VIII Bethlehem	
920	J. Gary Gloster	630 893 741	1996	North Carolina (Suffragan)	
921	Edwin M. Leidel Jr.	630 833 719	1996	I Eastern Michigan	
922	Clifton Daniel	630 735 712	1996	VII East Carolina, Pennsylvania (Provisional)	
923	Henry N. Parsley Jr.	630 808 785	1996	X Alabama, Easton (Provisional), South Carolina (Visiting)	
924	Gordon Scruton	630 653 783	1996	VIII Western Massachusetts	
925	F. Neff Powell	630 729 796	1996	V Southwestern Virginia	
926	Richard S.O. Chang	630 744 745	1997	IV Hawaii	
927	Charles E. Bennison (son)	630 804 831	1997	XV Pennsylvania	
928	Rodney R. Michel	630 826 703	1997	Long Island (Suffragan), Georgia (Assistant), Pennsylvania (Assistant)	
929	Catherine Waynick	812 719 667	1997	X Indianapolis, Eastern Michigan (Provisional)	
930	C. Wallis Ohl Jr.	752 753 860	1997	IV Northwest Texas, Fort Worth (Provisional)	
931	Theodore A. Daniels	734 819 675	1997	IV Virgin Islands	
932	David C. Bane Jr.	829 796 687	1997	IX Southern Virginia	
933	Mark MacDonald	630 853 750	1997	VII Alaska, Indigenous Archbishop (Canada), Navajoland (Assistant)	
934	Bruce E. Caldwell	846 721 850	1997	VIII Wyoming, Lexington (Provisional)	
935	Daniel W. Herzog	630 782 924	1997	VIII Albany	
936	Charles Jenkins	794 711 852	1998	X Louisiana	
937	Barry R. Howe	794 835 795	1998	VII West Missouri, Southwest Florida (Assistant)	
938	Chilton R. Knudsen	794 637 913	1998	VIII Maine, Maryland (Assistant), Washington (Assisting), Chicago (Assisting)	
939	Mark Sisk	794 758 734	1998	XV New York	
940	Harry B. Bainbridge, III	812 867 857	1998	XIV Idaho	
941	Wayne P. Wright	840 936 887	1998	X Delaware	
942	John L. Rabb	840 909 767	1998	Maryland (Suffragan)	
943	John Palmer Croneberger	812 713 866	1998	IX Newark	
944	Charles G. vonRosenberg	867 586 733	1999	III East Tennessee, South Carolina (Provisional)	
945	William D. Persell	794 812 890	1999	XI Chicago, Ohio (Assistant)	
946	Keith Bernard Whitmore	794 750 904	1999	V Eau Claire, Atlanta (Assistant), North Dakota (Assisting)	
947	J. Michael Garrison	794 811 809	1999	X Western New York, Southwest Florida (Assistant)	
948	Jim Kelsey	794 769 847	1999	X Northern Michigan	
949	D. Bruce MacPherson	851 879 828	1999	Dallas (Suffragan), III Western Louisiana	
950	Wendell N. Gibbs	812 587 834	2000	X Michigan	
951	George E. Packard	794 854 758	2000	V Armed Services	
952	Edward S. Little, II	812 815 832	2000	VII Northern Indiana	
953	J. Jon Bruno	858 828 861	2000	VI Los Angeles	
954	David Bena	794 935 782	2000	Albany (Suffragan)	
955	Michael Bruce Curry	837 920 834	2000	XI North Carolina	PB-27
956	Duncan Montgomery Gray III	794 869 698	2000	IX Mississippi	
957	William O. Gregg	630 745 801	2000	VI Eastern Oregon, North Carolina (Assistant)	
958	Stacy F. Sauls	837 789 891	2000	VI Lexington	
959	James E. Curry	805 917 763	2000	Connecticut (Suffragan)	
960	Wilfrido Ramos-Orench	805 917 763	2000	Connecticut (Suffragan), Central Ecuador (Provisional), Puerto Rico (Assistant), Puerto Rico (Provisional)	
961	James E. Waggoner Jr.	868 687 900	2000	VIII Spokane, Nevada (Assisting)	
962	David Jung-Hsin Lai	926 825 SHO	2000	VI Taiwan	
963	Katharine Jefferts Schori	868 801 918	2001	III Nevada, San Diego (Assisting)	PB26
964	Roy F. "Bud" Cederholm Jr.	805 898 834	2001	Massachusetts (Suffragan)	
965	Thomas C. Ely	805 887 806 917	2001	X Vermont, **North Dakota** (Provisional)	
966	Philip M. Duncan II	794 755 937 839	2001	III Central Gulf Coast	
967	Don E. Johnson	794 888 586 944	2001	III West Tennessee	
968	J. Neil Alexander	794 818 723	2001	IX Atlanta	
969	Francisco Duque-Gómez	794 730 856	2001	IV Colombia	
970	W. Michie Klusmeyer	794 945 687	2001	VII West Virginia	
971	Lloyd Allen	779 780 LYO	2001	**III Honduras**	
972	Gladstone B. Adams III	866 671 891 871	2001	X Central New York, South Carolina (Provisional), Eastern Michigan and Western Michigan (Assisting)	
973	Pierre Whalon	794 821 839	2001	I Europe (Note: From the 19th century onwards, visiting bishops from the USA provided episcopal oversight to the American congregations in Europe. From late in the 19th century, recently retired "Bishops-in-charge" were appointed for two or three years, living in Europe for several months at a time. In 1993 that pattern changed, and a full-time, non-retired resident Bishop in Charge of the Convocation was appointed, Jeffery Rowthorn. And then, in 2001, the Convocation elected its own bishop, Pierre Whalon.)	
974	Marc Handley Andrus	794 923 785	2002	Alabama (Suffragan), **VIII California**	
975	George W. Smith	890 863 830	2002	X Missouri, Southern Ohio	
976	James M. Adams Jr.	851 904 894	2002	IV Western Kansas	
977	Carol Gallagher	840 932 834	2002	Southern Virginia (Suffragan), Newark (Assistant), Montana (Assistant), **Massachusetts** (regional canon for the Central Region)	
978	Robert R. Gepert	812 847 772	2002	VIII Western Michigan	
979	John Bryson Chane	794 876 814	2002	VIII Washington	
980a	Henry Scriven	CAR Translated from Europe	1995	Gibraltar (C of E) (Suffragan), Europe (Assistant), Pittsburgh (Assistant)	
981	Gayle Harris	812 898 834	2003	Massachusetts (Suffragan), **Virginia** (Assistant)	
982	James J. "Bud" Shand	909 877 775	2003	X Easton	
983	Alan Scarfe	885 830 981	2003	IX Iowa	
984a	David Álvarez	779 772 608 506	1987	VI Puerto Rico	
985	Joe G. Burnett	885 717 846 968 869 956 698	2003	X Nebraska	
986	Johncy Itty	794 630 801 928 779 826	2003	IX Oregon	
987	C. Franklin Brookhart Jr.	794 970 854 885	2003	IX Montana	
988	Rayford B. High Jr.	949 789 884 845 931 604	2003	Texas (Suffragan), Fort Worth (Assistant)	
989	Robert J. O'Neill	885 860 898 754 834	2003	X Colorado	
990	George Councell	794 783 945 924 702	2003	XI New Jersey	
991	Steven Miller	950 787 662 894 946	2003	XI Milwaukee	
992	John Howard	936 892 699 839 914 852	2003	VIII Florida	
993	Gene Robinson	794 630 767 834 938 STE 748	2003	IX New Hampshire	
994	Dean E. Wolfe	949 851 758 753 732 ELA	2003	IX Kansas	
995	Gary R. Lillibridge	794 889 911 604 802 822 718	2004	IX West Texas	
996	Mark Hollingsworth	950 890 898 834 563 732	2004	XI Ohio	
997	Kirk Stevan Smith	794 875 953 963	2004	V Arizona	
998	Michael G. Smith	794 850 740 885	2004	XI North Dakota, Albany (assistant)	
999	G. Porter Taylor	893 968 818 837 955	2004	VI Western North Carolina, Virginia (assisting)	
1000	Jeffrey N. Steenson	794 836 791 933 BRT	2005	V Rio Grande	

=== 1001–1100 ===
No.	Bishop	Consecrators	Year	Diocese	Notes
1001	Nedi Rivera	940 843 732 751 912	2005	Olympia (Suffragan), Eastern Oregon (Provisional)	
1002	James R. Mathes	926 874 995 945 697 864 722	2005	IV San Diego	
1003	E. Ambrose Gumbs	812 678 826	2005	V Virgin Islands	
1004a	Orlando Guerrero	WIL (Note: Guerrero was consecrated on August 12, 1995 by Cornelius Wilson, Bishop of Costa Rica; Julio Cesar Holguin-Khoury, Bishop of República Dominicana (870); and Bernardo Merino Botero, Bishop of Colombia (730); which three were assisted by Onell Soto, Bishop of Venezuela (906a); Rawle E. Douglin, Bishop of Trinidad and Tobago, Clarence Wallace Hayes Dewar, Bishop of Panamá and Haydn H. Jones, retired Bishop of Venezuela) 870 730	1995	III Venezuela (see 906a above)	
1005	David M. Reed	949 995 889 802 822	2006	X West Texas	
1006	Todd Ousley	950 921 948 978 988	2006	II Eastern Michigan	
1007	William H. Love	794 935 954 782 MIL	2006	IX Albany	
1008	Barry L. Beisner	940 963 868 971 744 828	2006	VII Northern California	
1009	Dena Harrison	949 789 988 884 912 747	2006	Texas (Suffragan)	
1010	Nathan D. Baxter	794 910 979 981 982	2006	X Central Pennsylvania	
1011	Larry R. Benfield	963 748 895 937	2007	XIII Arkansas	
1012	Mark M. Beckwith	963 722 943 713 924 981	2007	X Newark	
1013	John C. Bauerschmidt	922 882 711 923 968	2007	**XI Tennessee**	
1014	Dabney T. Smith	922 914 648 936 815	2007	V Southwest Florida	
1015	Robert L. Fitzpatrick	963 926 962 951 952	2007	**V Hawaii, Micronesia** (Oversight)	
1016	Thomas E. Breidenthal	963 900 737 702 939 990	2007	IX Southern Ohio	
1017	Shannon S. Johnston	963 785 907 956 968 950	2007	XIII Virginia	
1018	Laura J. Ahrens	963 959 912 917 843	2007	**Connecticut** (Suffragan)	
1019	Sean W. Rowe	963 840 772 812 941	2007	VIII Northwestern Pennsylvania, Western New York (Provisional)	PB-28
1020	Edward J. Konieczny	963 952 824 989	2007	V Oklahoma	
1021	Gregory Rickel	926 843 1001 789 1009 1011	2007	VIII Olympia **Southeast Florida** (assisting)	
1022	Mary Gray-Reeves	963 1027a 728 906a 508 BOY	2007	III El Camino Real	
1023	Dan Edwards	963 968 868 996	2008	IV Nevada	
1024	Kee Sloan	963 923 808 698 956	2008	Alabama (Suffragan), XI Alabama	
1025	Mark Lawrence	922 870 897 749 852	2008	XIV South Carolina	
1026	Jeffrey Lee	963 950 938 945 794 815	2008	XII Chicago	
1027a	Sylvester Romero Palma	Translated from Belize	1994	XIII Belize, New Jersey (Assistant)	
1028	Stephen T. Lane	963 866 938 959 993	2008	IX Maine, Rochester (Provisional)	
1029	Prince G. Singh	963 866 1012 990 943 977	2008	VIII Rochester, Eastern Michigan (Provisional), Western Michigan (Provisional)	
1030	Eugene Sutton	963 979 1010 909 942 767	2008	XIV Maryland	
1031	Paul E. Lambert	949 879 998 976 627	2008	Dallas (Suffragan)	
1032	Brian J. Thom	963 940 868 801 857	2008	XIII Idaho	
1033	C. Andrew Doyle	963 789 1009 988 747 884	2008	**IX Texas**	
1034	Herman Hollerith IV	963 785 925 835 883	2009	X Southern Virginia	
1035	Scott Mayer	963 753 930 1011 789 1031	2009	**V Northwest Texas**, Fort Worth (Provisional)	
1036	Luis Fernando Ruiz	963 969 960 603 917 981	2009	III Central Ecuador	
1037	Lawrence C. Provenzano	963 924 990 1012 871 783	2009	**VIII Long Island**	
1038	John T. Tarrant	963 896 786 924 990 998	2009	X South Dakota	
1039	Scott Benhase	963 901 1030 778 1027a 812	2010	X Georgia	
1040	Brian Prior	963 885 961 727 958 1028 1001 722	2010	IX Minnesota, Olympia (Assisting), Alabama (Assisting)	
1041	Michael Joseph Hanley	963 1021 1001 1040 838 885 1040	2010	X Oregon	
1042	Ian Douglas	963 955 952 852 794 917 898	2010	XV Connecticut	
1043	Morris K. Thompson	963 958 956 711 936	2010	XI Louisiana	
1044	Diane Jardine Bruce	963 953 1037 828 844 861	2010	Los Angeles (Suffragan), West Missouri (Provisional)	
1045	Mary Glasspool	963 953 997 996 909 1030 942 834	2010	Los Angeles (Suffragan), New York (Assistant)	
1046	W. Andrew Waldo	963 881 923 902 1044 1040 812	2010	VIII Upper South Carolina	
1047	Jay Magness	963 891 951 1010 979 1034 854	2010	VI Armed Services, Southern Virginia (Assistant)	
1048	John Sheridan Smylie	963 1040 955 904 934 721	2010	IX Wyoming	
1049	David Bailey	963 918 745 998 977 868	2010	III Navajoland	
1050	Mark Lattime	963 1029 866 990 961	2010	**VIII Alaska**	
1051	Terry A. White	963 891 937 990 1002 587 (Note: William O. Gafkjen, Bishop of the India-Kentucky Synod, Evangelical Lutheran Church in America, was also a co-consecrator.)	2010	**VIII Kentucky**	
1052	Michael Vono	963 906a 973 1011 627	2010	IX Rio Grande	
1053	Scott B. Hayashi	963 918 1008 1045 864 (Note: Allan Bjornberg, Bishop of the Rocky Mountain Synod, Evangelical Lutheran Church in America, was also a co-consecrator.)	2010	XI Utah	
1054	Michael Pierce Milliken	963 994 1011 904	2011	V Western Kansas, Kansas (Assistant)	
1055	Martin Scott Field	963 937 994 1054 975	2011	VIII West Missouri	
1056	Daniel Hayden Martins	963 952 894 872 766 KER	2011	XI Springfield	
1057	Ralph William Franklin	963 939 973 947 1052 990 811	2011	XI Western New York, **Long Island** (Assisting)	
1058	Rayford Jeffrey Ray	963 1006 950 978 769 (Note: Thomas Skrenes, Bishop of the Northern Great Lakes Synod of the Evangelical Lutheran Church in America was also a co-consecrator.)	2011	**XI Northern Michigan**	
1059	George D. Young III	963 1013 967 699 992 854 586 944	2011	IV East Tennessee	
1060	Joseph Scott Barker	963 985 939 1048 870	2011	**XI Nebraska**	
1061	Mariann Budde	963 1040 1012 979 876; 1045 1030 (Note: Ecumenical co-consecrators of Budde were Richard H. Graham, Bishop of the Metropolitan Washington, D.C. Synod of the Evangelical Lutheran Church in America and Doug Kleintop, Bishop of the Northern Province of the American Provinces of the Moravian Church.)	2011	**IX Washington**	
1062	Andrew M. L. Dietsche	963 939 990 758 1037 950 912 (Note: Ecumenical co-consecrator of Dietsche was Robert A. Rimbo, Bishop of the Metropolitan New York Synod of the Evangelical Lutheran Church in America.)	2012	XVI New York	
1063	Gregory Orrin Brewer	922 839 1007 998 648 815 937	2012	IV Central Florida	
1064	Ogé Beauvoir	963 881 939 1037 959 780	2012	Haiti (Suffragan)	
1065	Jacob Wayne Owensby	963 949 975 1043 1014 952 956	2012	**IV Western Louisiana**	
1066	Susan Ellyn Goff	963 1017 891 785 907 1018 (Note: Ecumenical co-consecrator of Goff was James Mauney, Bishop of the Virginia Synod of the Evangelical Lutheran Church in America.)	2012	Virginia (Suffragan)	
1067	A. Robert Hirschfeld	963 993 924 1018 736 898	2012	**X New Hampshire**	
1068	Jeff W. Fisher	963 1033 1009 789 884 988	2012	**Texas** (Suffragan)	
1069	Robert Christopher Wright	963 968 955 876 818 861	2012	**X Atlanta**	
1070	Dorsey W. M. McConnell	963 900 898 890 952 919 (Note: Ecumenical co-consecrator of McConnell was Kurt F. Kusserow, Bishop of the Southwestern Pennsylvania Synod of the Evangelical Lutheran Church in America.)	2012	VIII Pittsburgh	
1071	Nicholas Knisely	963 996 1028 744 913	2012	**XIII Rhode Island**	
1072a	Santosh Marray	Translated from Seychelles	2005	Seychelles, East Carolina (Assistant), Alabama (Assistant), XI Easton	
1073	Douglas John Fisher	963 924 939 1062 1067	2012	IX Western Massachusetts	
1074	Douglas Hahn	963 968 1051 958 938 881 (Note: Ecumenical co-consecrator of Hahn was William O. Gafkjen, Bishop of the Indiana-Kentucky Synod of the Evangelical Lutheran Church in America.)	2012	VII Lexington	
1075	William Jay Lambert III	963 894 1063	2013	VI Eau Claire	
1076	Anne Hodges-Copple	963 955 1039 920 1066	2013	North Carolina (Suffragan)	
1077	Mark Bourlakas	963 955 968 729	2013	VI Southwestern Virginia **Virginia** (Assistant)	
1078	Whayne M. Hougland Jr.	963 955 958 (Note: Ecumenical co-consecrator of Hougland was Kreiss, Bishop of the Southeast Michigan Synod of the Evangelical Lutheran Church in America.)	2013	IX Western Michigan, Eastern Michigan (Provisional)	
1079	William H. Stokes	963 990 780 1012	2013	XII New Jersey	
1080a	David Rice	Translated from Waiapu	2008	San Joaquin (Provisional), V San Joaquin	
1081	Matthew Alan Gunter	963 1026 991 894 1074 970	2014	VIII Fond du Lac, **IX** **Wisconsin**	
1082	Allen K. Shin	963 1062 1037 758 939	2014	**New York** (Suffragan)	
1083	Heather Cook	963 1030 982 909 942 972 1066 1061 767 923 (Note: Ecumenical co-consecrator of Cook was Wolfgang Herz-Lane, District Executive Minister of the Delaware-Maryland Synod of the Evangelical Lutheran Church in America.)	2014	Maryland (Suffragan)	(Note: Cook was deposed in May 2015 by Presiding Bishop Katharine Jefferts Schori following a hit and run accident that claimed the life of a bicyclist.)
1084	Alan M. Gates	1028 898 990 1045 981 996 (Note: Ecumenical co-consecrator of Gates was Wilma S. Kucharek, Bishop of the Slovak Zion Synod of the Evangelical Lutheran Church in America.)	2014	XVI Massachusetts	
1085	Brian R. Seage	963 956 953 1017	2014	X Mississippi Texas (Assisting)	
1086	Robert Skirving	963 1006 870 922 785	2014	VIII East Carolina	
1087	Peter Eaton	963 780 989	2015	**IV Southeast Florida**	
1088	Russell Kendrick	963 966 1033 1072 755 1075	2015	**IV Central Gulf Coast**	
1089	Audrey Scanlan	963 1042 1018 1019 1070 1061	2015	XI Central Pennsylvania **I Susquehanna**	
1090	George R. Sumner	955 1031 1013 1056 627 998 879 (Note: Ecumenical co-consecrator of Gates was Kevin Kanouse, Bishop of the Northern Texas-Northern Louisiana of the Evangelical Lutheran Church in America.)	2015	VII Dallas	
1091	Moisés Quezada Mota	955 870 678 915 960 971	2016	**IV Dominican Republic**	
1092a	Mark van Koevering	Translated from Niassa	2003	West Virginia (Assistant), Lexington (Provisional), **VIII Lexington**	
1093	Patrick W. Bell	955 1001 961 1006 1049 957 (Note: Ecumenical Co-consecrator of Patrick Bell was David Brauer-Rieke, Bishop of Oregon Synod of the Evangelical Lutheran Church in America.)	2016	VII Eastern Oregon	
1094	Douglas Sparks	955 952 1040 815 929 1080 (Note: Ecumenical Co-consecrator of Douglas Sparks was William Gafkjen, Bishop of Indiana-Kentucky Synod of the Evangelical Lutheran Church in America.)	2016	**VIII Northern Indiana**	
1095	Daniel G. P. Gutierrez	955 922 1052 834	2016	**XVI Pennsylvania**	
1096	José Antonio McLoughlin	955 999 1020 785 1009	2016	**VII Western North Carolina**	
1097	DeDe Duncan-Probe	955 1017 834 1022 1066 907 (Note: Ecumenical co-consecrator of Duncan Probe was John Stanley Macholz, Bishop of the Upstate New York Synod of the Evangelical Lutheran Church in America.)	2016	**XI Central New York**	
1098	Carl Wright	955 1047 1030 951 767 (Note: Ecumenical co-consecrator of Wright was Richard Graham, Bishop of the Metropolitan Washington DC Synod of the Evangelical Lutheran Church in America.)	2017	VII Armed Services	
1099	Gretchen Rehberg	955 961 1016 1053 1089	2017	**IX Spokane**	
1100	Jennifer Baskerville-Burrows	955 929 1094 834 981 1069 (Note: Ecumenical Co-consecrator of Jennifer Baskerville-Burrows was William Gafkjen, Bishop of Indiana-Kentucky Synod of the Evangelical Lutheran Church in America.)	2017	**XI Indianapolis**	

=== 1101–1200 ===
No.	Bishop	Consecrators	Year	Diocese	Notes
1101	John Taylor	955 953 1044 861 844 (Note: Ecumenical Co-consecrator of John Taylor was R. Guy Erwin, Bishop of Southwest California Synod of the Evangelical Lutheran Church in America.)	2017	**VII Los Angeles**	
1102	Samuel S. Rodman, III	955 1084 1076 1096 1086 834 (Note: Ecumenical Co-consecrator of Samuel Rodman was Timothy Smith, Bishop of the North Carolina Synod of the Evangelical Lutheran Church in America.)	2017	**XII North Carolina**	
1103	Rafael Morales	955 960 984a 870 1087	2017	**VII Puerto Rico**	
1104	Jennifer Brooke-Davidson	955 1005 1018 995 1100 1095 (Note: Ecumenical Co-consecrator of Jennifer Brooke-Davidson was The Rev Ray Tiemann, Bishop of the Southwestern Texas Synod of the Evangelical Lutheran Church in America)	2017	West Texas (Suffragan), Virginia (Assistant), **North Carolina** (Assistant)	
1105a	Hector Monterroso	Translated from Costa Rica	2017	**Texas** (Assistant)	
1106	Brian Lee Cole	955 950 1077 1059 893 968	2017	**V East Tennessee**	
1107	Kevin S. Brown	955 967 941 1076 1105a	2017	**XI Delaware**	
1108	Kevin Donnelly Nichols	955 1019 1067 1089 794 (Note: Ecumenical Co-consecrators for Kevin D. Nichols were Samuel R. Zeiser, Bishop of the Northeastern Pennsylvania Synod of the Evangelical Lutheran Church in America and M. Blair Couch, Bishop of the Northern Province of the Moravian Church in America)	2018	**IX Bethlehem**	
1109	Carlye J. Hughes	955 1097 1035 834 1012 1100 (Note: Ecumenical Co-consecrator of Carlye J Hughes was M. Blair Couch, Bishop of the Northern Province of the Moravian Church in America)	2018	**XI Newark**	
1110	Michael Buerkel Hunn	955 1052 1022 1009 1077 1049 1095 (Note: Ecumenical Co-consecrator of Michael Buerkel Hunn was the Rev. James W. Gonia, Bishop of the Rocky Mountain Synod of the Evangelical Lutheran Church in America)	2018	**X Rio Grande**	
1111	Mark Andrew Cowell	955 1054 1055 976	2018	**VI Western Kansas**	
1112	Cathleen Chittenden Bascom	955 974 983 1111 938 1054	2019	**X Kansas**	
1113	Jennifer Anne Reddall	955 997 1099 1062 912 GOM (Note: Ecumenical Co-consecrator of Jennifer Anne Reddall was the Rev. Deborah Hutterer, Bishop of the Grand Canyon Synod of the Evangelical Lutheran Church in America)	2019	**VI Arizona**	
1114	Cristobal Olmedo Leon Lozano	955 1103 1062 1095 870 960	2019	**III Litoral Ecuador**	
1115	Mark David Wheeler Edington	955 1084 973 1073 981 1042 VER	2019	**II Europe**	
1116	Phoebe Alison Roaf	955 1100 938 967 1017 748 936	2019	**IV West Tennessee**	
1117	Kimberly Lucas	955 989 1100 981 1030 1061 938 (Note: Ecumenical Co-consecrator of Kimberly Lucas was the Rt Rev Jim Gonia, Bishop of the Rocky Mountain Synod of the Evangelical Lutheran Church in America)	2019	**XI Colorado**	
1118	Kathryn McCrossen Ryan	955 1033 1035 1068 1009 1105a 789	2019	**Texas** (Suffragan)	
1119	Susan Brown Snook	963 1020 1022 1002 1021 997 1101 GOM (Note: Ecumenical Co-consecrators for Susan Brown Snook were Dr. Andy Taylor, Bishop of the Pacific Synod of the Evangelical Lutheran Church in America and Dr. Kay Ward, Bishop of the Northern Province of the Moravian Church in America)	2019	**V San Diego**	
1120	Thomas James Brown	955 1060 1100 1084 1045 1028 (Note: Ecumenical Co-consecrator of Thomas Brown was The Rev James Hazelwood, Bishop of the New England Synod of the Evangelical Lutheran Church in America)	2019	**X Maine**	
1121	Megan M. Traquair	955 1096 1022 1008 1021 (Note: Ecumenical Co-consecrator of Megan Traquair was the Rev Mark W. Holmerud, Bishop of the Sierra Pacific Synod of the Evangelical Lutheran Church in America)	2019	**VIII Northern California**	
1122	Shannon MacVean-Brown	955 1100 981 965 938 833	2019	**XI Vermont**	
1123	Jonathan Folts	955 1005 1042 889 1038 MAT	2019	**XI South Dakota**	
1124	Martha Elizabeth Stebbins	955 1102 1048 987 1076 (Note: Ecumenical Co-consecrator of Martha Stebbins was the Rev Laurie Jungling, Bishop of the Montana Synod of the Evangelical Lutheran Church in America)	2019	**X Montana**	
1125	Lucinda Ashby	955 1022 1032 1008 868 1129 (Note: Ecumenical Co-consecrator of Lucinda Ashby was the Rev Mark Holmerud, Bishop of the Sierra Pacific Synod of the Evangelical Lutheran Church in America)	2020	**IV El Camino Real**	
1126	Susan B. Haynes	955 1119 1094 815 1034 952 1047	2020	**XI Southern Virginia**	
1127	Bonnie A. Perry	955 1026 1061 1100 950 938 (Note: Ecumenical Co-consecrator of Bonnie Perry was the Rev. Donald Kreiss, Bishop of the Southeast Michigan Synod of the Evangelical Lutheran Church in America)	2020	**XI Michigan**	
1128	Lennon Yuan-Rung Chang	955 962 1015 UEM ISO 1021	2020	**VII Taiwan**	
1129	Griselda Delgado del Carpio	Translated from Cuba 963 HIL HOL	2020	**VIII Cuba**	
1130	Frank S. Logue	1039 1069 1019 (Note: To prevent the spread of COVID-19 attendance at the consecration was very limited, thus there were no ecumenical co-consecrators.)	2020	**XI Georgia**	
1131	Poulson C. Reed	1011 1020 1087 1089 (Note: Ecumenical Co-consecrator of Poulson Reed was the Rev. Michael K. Girlinghouse, Bishop of the Arkansas-Oklahoma Synod of the Evangelical Lutheran Church in America)	2020	**VI Oklahoma**	
1132	Craig W. Loya	1040 1060 934	2020	**X Minnesota**	
1133	Deon K. Johnson	975 1127 1116 1100	2020	**XI Missouri**	
1134	Glenda Sharp Curry	1039 1024 1116 1065	2020	XII Alabama	
1135	Diana Dorothy Akiyama	1099 1015 1041 (Note: Ecumenical Co-consecrator of Diana D. Akiyama was the Rev Laurie Larson Caesar, Bishop of the Oregon Synod of the Evangelical Lutheran Church in America.)	2021	**XI Oregon**	
1136	Paul-Gordon Chandler	963 1117 1040 1048 (Note: Ecumenical Co-consecrator of Paul-Gordon Chandler was the Rev Jim Gonia, Bishop, Rocky Mountain Synod of the Evangelical Lutheran Church in America.)	2021	X Wyoming	(Note: Paul-Gordon Chandler was deposed by presiding-bishop designate Mary Graves-Reeves under a Title IV accord in March 2024.)
1137	Ruth Woodliff-Stanley	955 1117 1019 989 1127 (Note: Ecumenical Co-consecrator of Ruth Woodliff-Stanley was The Right Reverend G. Thomas Shelton, Bishop, The Moravian Church in America, Southern Province)	2021	**XV South Carolina**	
1138	Ketlen A. Solak	955 1107 1109 1070 941 907 (Note: Ecumenical Co-consecrator of Ketlen Solak was Bishop Kurt Kusserow of the Southwestern Pennsylvania Synod of the Evangelical Lutheran Church in America)	2021	**IX Pittsburgh**	
1139	Betsey Monnot	955 1125 983 938 MMS (Note: Ecumenical Co-consecrator of Betsey Monnot was Bishop Amy Current of the Southeastern Iowa Synod of the Evangelical Lutheran Church in America)	2021	**X Iowa**	
1140a	Fraser Lawton	Translated from Athabasca	2022	**Dallas (assistant)**	
1141	Daniel P. Richards	955 1113 1137 1046	2022	**IX Upper South Carolina**	
1142	Elizabeth Bonforte Gardner	955 1087 1099 963 1023	2022	**IX Nevada**	
1143	Matthew Davis Cowden	955 970 1094 952 1066 1126 (Note: Ecumenical Co-consecrator of Matthew Davis Cowden was Bishop Matthew L. Riegel of the Western Maryland Synod of the Evangelical Lutheran Church in America)	2022	**VIII** **West Virginia**	
1144	Juan Carlos Quiñonez Mera	955 971 1103 1091 960	2022	**IV Central Ecuador**	
1145	Brian Kendall Burgess	955 1063 1013 968 1079 1056 (Note: Ecumenical Co-consecrator of Brian Kendall Burgess was the S. John Roth, Bishop of the Central/Southern Illinois Synod of the Evangelical Lutheran Church in America)	2022	**XII Springfield**	
1146	Jos Tharakan	955 1032 1044 1011 1099 1133 (Note: Ecumenical Co-consecrator of Jos Tharakan was Bishop Laurie Jungling of the Montana Synod of the Evangelical Lutheran Church in America)	2022	**XIV Idaho**	
1147	Paula E. Clark	955 1100 1133 938 1117 1094 (Note: Ecumenical Co-consecrator of Paula E. Clark was Bishop Yeheil Curry of the Metropolitan Chicago Synod of the Evangelical Lutheran Church in America.)	2022	**XIII Chicago**	
1148	Phyllis A. Spiegel	963 1053 1146 (Note: Ecumenical Co-consecrator of Phylis Spiegel was Bishop Jim Gonia of the Rocky Mountain Synod of the Evangelical Lutheran Church in America.)	2022	**XII Utah**	
1149	Douglas F. Scharf	955 1014 1129 1087 1068 1085 (Note: Ecumenical Co-consecrator of Douglas F. Scharf was Bishop Robert G. Schaefer (resigned) of the Florida-Bahamas Synod of the Evangelical Lutheran Church in America.)	2022	**VI Southwest Florida**	
1150	Jeffrey Mello	955 1120 981 1042 1018 1084 (Note: Ecumenical Co-consecrator of Jeffry W. Mello was Bishop James Hazelwood, of the New England Synod of the Evangelical Lutheran Church in America.)	2022	**XVI Connecticut**	
1151	Shannon Rogers Duckworth	955 1043 1110 956 1096 1118 (Note: Ecumenical Co-consecrator of Shannon R. Duckworth was Bishop Michael Rinehart, of the Texas-Louisiana Gulf Coast Synod of the Evangelical Lutheran Church in America.)	2022	**XII Louisiana**	
1152	E. Mark Stevenson	955 1066 1019 970 981 1006 1142 (Note: Ecumenical Co-consecrators of E. Mark Stevenson were Lane Sapp, Bishop of the Southern Province of the Worldwide Moravian Unity and Robert F. Humphrey, Bishop of the Virginia Synod of the Evangelical Lutheran Church in America.)	2022	**XIV Virginia**	
1153a	Melissa Maxine Skelton	Translated from New Westminster	2023	Olympia (Provisional)	
1154	Elías García Cárdenas	955 1144 1103 1091 969	2023	**V Columbia**	
1155	Anne B. Jolly	955 996 1026 1147 938 1094 (Note: Ecumenical Co-consecrator of Anne B. Jolly was Laura H. Barbins, Bishop of the Northeast Ohio Synod of the Evangelical Lutheran Church in America)	2023	**XII Ohio**	
1156	Matthew Heyd	955 1062 1100 1155 1045 1082 912 939 (Note: Ecumenical Co-consecrators for Matthew Heyd were Paul T. Egensteiner, Bishop of the Metropolitan New York Synod of the Evangelical Lutheran Church in America, and M. Blair Couch, Bishop of the Northern Province of the Moravian Church in America.)	2023	**XVII New York**	
1157	Justin S. Holcomb	970 1063 971 1013 1090 1129 (Note: Ecumenical Co-consecrator of Justin S. Holcomb was Bishop Matthew L. Riegel of the Western Maryland Synod of the Evangelical Lutheran Church in America)	2023	**V Central Florida**	
1158	Sally French	1022 1079 1102 1039 1109 1110 VIC (Note: Ecumenical Co-consecrator of Sally French was Bishop M. Blair Couch of the Morovian Church in North America and Bishop Patricia Ann Curtis Davenport of the Southeastern Pennsylvania Synod of the Evangelical Lutheran Church in America)	2023	**XIII New Jersey**	
1159	David G. Read	970 1055 988 1123 899 1118 (Note: Ecumenical Co-consecrator of David Read was Bishop Susan J. Briner, Bishop of the Southwestern Texas Synod, Evangelical Lutheran Church in America)	2023	**XI West Texas**	
1160	Carrie Schofield-Broadbent	1022 1030 1097 938 1130 1155 (Note: Ecumenical Co-consecrators of Carrie Schofield-Broadbent were Bishop William J. Gohl, Jr., Bishop of the Delaware-Maryland Synod, Evangelical Lutheran Church in America and Bishop M. Blair Couch, Bishop of the Northern Province, Moravian Church in America)	2023	**XV Maryland**	
1161	Ann Ritonia	1006 1030 938 1061 1110 1127 (Note: Ecumenical Co-consecrator of Ann Ritonia was Bishop William J. Gohl, Jr., Bishop of the Delaware-Maryland Synod, Evangelical Lutheran Church in America)	2023	**VIII Armed Services**	
1162	John T. W. Harmon	1068 981 1133 1011 1061 1116 (Note: Ecumenical Co-consecrator of John Harmon was Bishop Becca Middeke-Conlin of the Arkansas-Oklahoma Synod of the Evangelical Lutheran Church in America)	2024	**XIV Arkansas**	
1163	Kristin Uffelman White	950 975 1100 1155 1127 1026 (Note: Ecumenical Co-consecrator of Kristin White was Bishop Suzanne Darcy Dillahunt of the Southern Ohio Synod of the Evangelical Lutheran Church in America)	2024	**X Southern Ohio**	
1164	Jeremiah Williamson	1097 812 989 996 1117 1137 (Note: Ecumenical Co-consecrators of Jeremiah Williamson was Bishop Lee M. Miller II of the Upstate New York Synod of the Southern Ohio Synod of the Evangelical Lutheran Church in America and Bishop Blair Couch of the Northern Province of the Moravian Church in America)	2024	**X Albany**	
1165	Austin K. Rios	1044 1115 1120 974 1103 1116 (Note: Ecumenical Co-consecrator of Austin Rios was Bishop Jeff R. Johnson of the Sierra Pacific Synod of the Evangelical Lutheran Church in America)	2024	**IX California**	
1166	Kara Wagner Sherer	955 1147 1097 1028 1026 938 (Note: Ecumenical Co-consecrator of Kara Wagner Sherer was Bishop Lee Miller II of the Upstate New York Synod of the Evangelical Lutheran Church in America)	2024	**IX Rochester**	
1167	Dorothy Sanders Wells	955 1109 1134 967 1085	2024	**XI Mississippi**	
1168	Phil LaBelle	955 1153a 977 1135 1120 924 (Note: Ecumenical Co-consecrators of Phil LaBelle were Bishop Richard Jaech of the Southwestern Washington Synod and Bishop Shelly Bryan Wee of the Northwest Washington Synod, both of the Evangelical Lutheran Church in America)	2024	**IX Olympia**	
1169	Julia Whitworth	955 1100 1156 1073 977 1084 938 (Note: Ecumenical Co-consecrator of Julia Whitworth was Bishop Nathan D. Pipho of the New England Synod of the Evangelical Lutheran Church in America)	2024	**XVII Massachusetts**	
1170	Angela Cortiñas	1019 1033 1022 1105a 1040 1118	2025	**West Texas** (Suffragan)	
1171	Amy Dafler Meaux	1019 1044 1162 1133 1165 (Note: Ecumenical Co-consecrator of Amy Dafler Meaux was Bishop Susan Candea of the Central States Synod of the Evangelical Lutheran Church in America)	2025	**IX West Missouri**	
1172	Robert P. Price	1019 971 JAA 975 1090 1091 1013 (Note: Ecumenical Co-consecrator of Robert Price was Bishop Erik K. J. Gronberg of the Northern Texas-Northern Louisiana Synod of the Evangelical Lutheran Church in America)	2025	**VIII Dallas**	
1173	Angel Roberto Rivera Rodríguez	1019	2025	**IX Cuba**	
1174	Shay Craig	1019 1171 1123 1032 1169	2026	**XII North Dakota**	
1175	Gregory Kimura	1019 1080 1050 1101 1121 (Note: Ecumenical Co-consecrator of Gregory Kimura was Bishop Jeff Johnson of the Sierra Pacific Synod of the Evangelical Lutheran Church in America)	2026	**VI San Joaquin**	
1176	Miguelina Howell	1019 955 1147 1042 1109 870 1022 (Note: Ecumenical Co-consecrator of Miguelina Howell was Bishop Nathan D. Pipho of the New England Synod of the Evangelical Lutheran Church in America)	2026	**X Western Massachusetts**	
1177	Sarah Fisher	1019 968 1026 1127 1086 1069 (Note: Ecumenical Co-consecrator of Sarah Fisher was Bishop Emily Hartner of the North Carolina Synod of the Evangelical Lutheran Church in America)	2026	**IX East Carolina**	
1178	Karin MacPhail	1019 1066 1148 1160 1068 1077 (Note: Ecumenical Co-consecrator of Karin MacPhail was Bishop Phyllis Blair Milton of the Virginia Synod of the Evangelical Lutheran Church in America)	2026	**VII Southwestern Virginia**	
1179	Richard T. Lawson, III	1019 1151 1116 923 1024 1134 (Note: Ecumenical Co-consecrator of Richard Lawson was Bishop Kevin Strickland of the Southeastern Synod of the Evangelical Lutheran Church in America)	2026	**XIII Alabama**	
1180	Antonio Gallardo Lucena	1019 1101 1044 1176 1133 1151 (Note: Ecumenical Co-consecrators of Antonio Gallardo L. were Bishops Brenda Bos of the Southwest California Synod and David Nagler of the Pacifica Synod of the Evangelical Lutheran Church in America)	2026	**VIII Los Angeles**	
1181	Adam Shoemaker	1019 1120 955 981 1105a 1037 (Note: Ecumenical Co-consecrator of Adam Shoemaker was Bishop Katrina Foster of the Metropolitan New York Synod of the Evangelical Lutheran Church in America)	2026	**IX Long Island**	
1182	Keith Chen-Cheng Lee	1019 1128 1113 1015 962 1101 DER KIM	2026	Taiwan (coadjutor)	
1183	Elizabeth Berman	1019 1015 1168 1135 DAC (Note: Ecumenical Co-consecrator of Adam Shoemaker was Bishop David Nagler of the Pacifica Synod of the Evangelical Lutheran Church in America)	2026	**VI Hawaii**	

== Bishops elect ==
Projected Number	Bishop Elect	Diocese	Date of Election	Consents Announced	Scheduled Date of Consecration	Notes
1184	Jenifer Chatfield	Northwestern Pennsylvania	08/08/2026	09/15/2026	12/12/2026	
1185	David Sibley	Lexington	08/01/2026	09/17/2026	01/23/2027	
1186	J. Randolph Alexander	Florida	09/11/2026	10/20/2026	02/06/2027	
1187	Ed Cardoza	New Hampshire	10/24/2026	pending	03/06/2027	
1188	Colin Ambrose	Tennessee	10/24/2026	pending	04/10/2027	
1189	Whitney Rice	Kansas	10/24/2026	pending	04/17/2027	
1190	Zachary Nyein	Great Lakes	10/24/2026	pending	05/08/2027	

== See also ==
- Anglican Communion
- Apostolic succession
- Historical episcopate
- List of original dioceses of the Episcopal Church (United States)
- List of presiding bishops of the Episcopal Church in the United States of America

== Sources ==
- The Episcopal Church Annual, 2005. Harrisburg: Morehouse Publishing. 2005. ISBN 978-0-8192-2162-9. OCLC 61396834.
- Perry, William Stevens (1895). The Episcopate in America: Sketches, Biographical and Bibliographical, of the Bishops of the American Church, with a Preliminary Essay on the Historic Episcopate and Documentary Annals of the Introduction of the Anglican Line of Succession into America (Subscription ed.). New York: Christian Literature Company. OCLC 875733 – via Internet Archive.
