= Leonardo Romero =

Anglican bishop (b. 1930, d. 1986)

The Right Reverend Leonardo Romero Doctor of Divinity
- Presiding Bishop
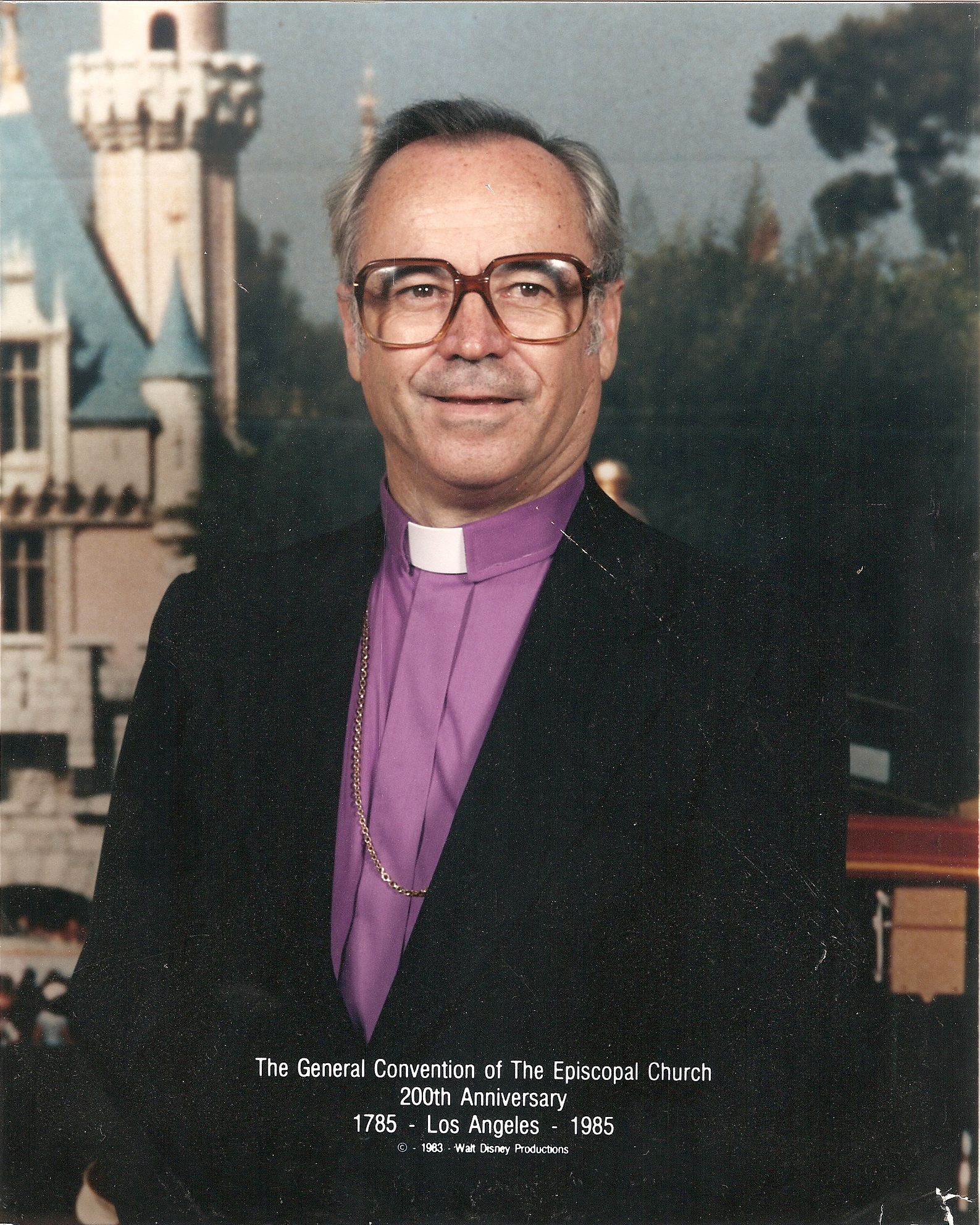
- Church: Anglican Church of Mexico
- Province: Province IX of the Episcopal Church
- Diocese: Northern Mexico

Bishop Leonardo Romero (August 13, 1930 – June 2, 1986) was a prominent prelate in the Anglican Church of Mexico and the Episcopal Church (Doctor of Divinity Virginia Theological Seminary).

In 1964, he was consecrated as Bishop Suffragan of the Diocese of Mexico and assigned to the Northern Mexico region. Following the 1972 General Convention, the original diocese was divided into three distinct jurisdictions; Bishop Romero was subsequently elected as the first bishop of the newly formed Diocese of Northern Mexico, a position he held until his death in 1986.

Throughout his distinguished career, his leadership extended across Latin America and the broader Anglican Communion. According to the Historical List of Bishops of the Episcopal Church, he served as the Bishop-in-Charge overseeing the Anglican Diocese in El Salvador starting in 1984. Additionally, he served as President of Province IX of the Episcopal Church and was an active member of its Executive Council until his sudden passing in June 1986, as documented by the Episcopal News Service Archives.

Bishop Romero was born in Dañu, Hidalgo, located in the Mexican highlands. He was of Spanish, Basque and French descent. His family roots were deeply tied to the region's agricultural and rural history; his parents owned the nearby Hacienda El Tejocote, a historic property typical of the rural estates that anchored the economy of the Hidalgo highlands during the late 19th and early 20th centuries.

His paternal lineage traces back to a French Sapeur (a combat engineer in the French Army's Corps de Génie) who chose to remain in Mexico after the conflict. This lineage reflects a well-documented historical phenomenon following the Second French Intervention in Mexico, which lasted from December 8, 1861, to June 21, 1867. When Napoleon III ordered the withdrawal of the French Expeditionary Force, thousands of French soldiers—particularly skilled specialists, craftsmen, and engineers like the Sapeurs— stayed behind.
