= Melchor Saucedo =

Melchor Saucedo Mendoza (January 15, 1920 – January 23, 2014) was a Mexican Anglican bishop. He was bishop of the Episcopal Diocese of Western Mexico, serving from 1973 until his retirement, in 1981.

== Education ==
He attended Virginia Theological Seminary before 1949 and then served the Aztec community of San Martin de las Flores.

== Episcopal ordination ==
In 1958, he was elevated to the episcopacy and served as auxiliary bishop of Mexico.
