= Hal R. Gross =

American bishop (died 2002)

Hal Raymond Gross (1911 - October 13, 2002) was a bishop in the Episcopal Church, serving as suffragan in the Diocese of Oregon from 1965 to 1979. Prior to that he had served as archdeacon.
