= Robert Louis Ladehoff =

8th bishop of Oregon

Robert Louis Ladehoff (born February 19, 1932) was eighth bishop of the Episcopal Diocese of Oregon. He was consecrated on November 30, 1985.
