= Plinio Lauer Simões =

Episcopal Bishop

Plinio Lauer Simões (July 8, 1915 – July 6, 1994) was a bishop in The Episcopal Church who served in his native country of Brazil.
