= Bravid W. Harris =

American Episcopal bishop (1896–1965)

Bravid Washington Harris (January 6, 1896 - October 21, 1965) was bishop of the Episcopal Diocese of Liberia, serving from 1945 to 1964. He was consecrated on April 17, 1945.

== Bibliography ==
- John M. Burgess, Bravid Washington Harris in Liberia (Builders for Christ) [undated]
