= Manuel Ferrando =

Missionary bishop

Manuel Ferrando (1868 - December 12, 1934) was a missionary bishop who served in Puerto Rico. He was ordained as a Catholic priest in his native Spain, where he became superior of a Capuchin monastery. From there he was sent to Latin America as a missionary. In 1902, he broke with Rome and started his own mission called the "Church of Jesus" in Puerto Rico.

Ferrando was consecrated as a bishop in the Reformed Episcopal Church on November 12, 1912.

Ferrando was consecrated as a suffragan bishop in The Episcopal Church in 1923.
