= Edwin J. Randall =

Edwin Jarvis Randall (October 24, 1869 – June 13, 1962) was a bishop of The Episcopal Church, serving in Chicago. He was born in Sparta, Wisconsin to Otis D. Randall (1830-1921) and Harriet Chapin Stout (1836-1896.) Randall married Evelyn Agnes McCarthy (1871-1942) in 1897.

== Bibliography ==
- The Church Catechism and the Living Word (1955)
