= Walter H. Overs =

Liberian Episcopalian bishop

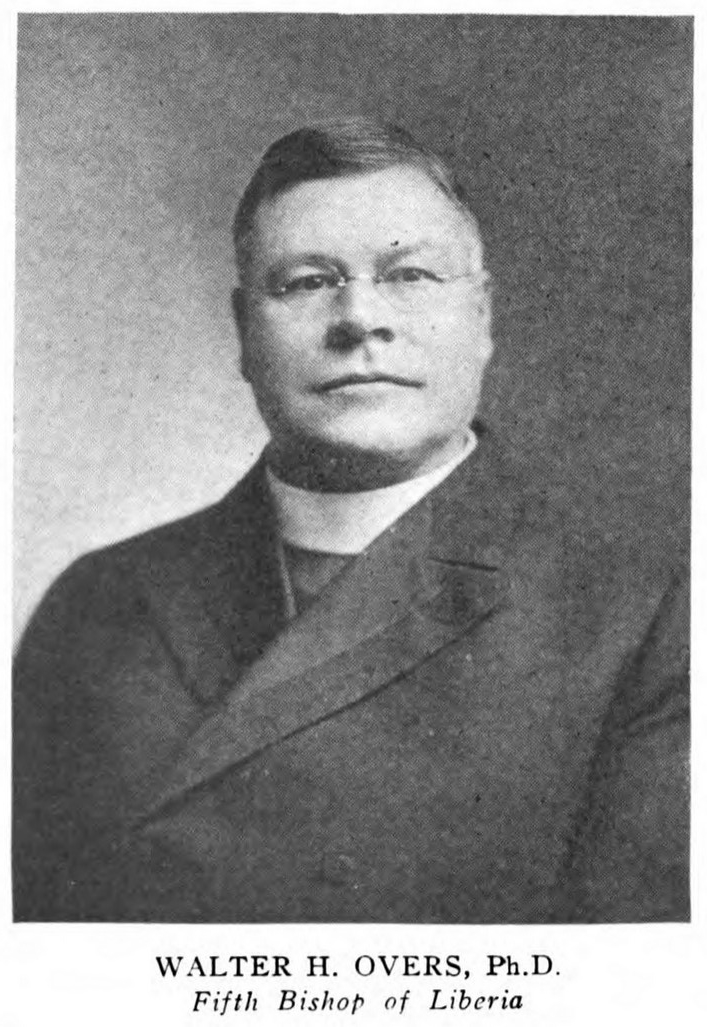
Bishop Overs in 1919

Walter Henry Overs (March 26, 1870 – June 17, 1934) was the fifth bishop of the Episcopal Diocese of Liberia.
