= Athalicio T. Pithan =

Bishop of the Anglican Episcopal Church of Brazil

Athalício Theodoro Pithan
- Bishop of Brazil
- Church: Anglican Episcopal Church of Brazil

Orders
- Consecration: 1940

Personal details
- Born: September 20, 1898; Santa Maria, Rio Grande do Sul
- Died: August 29, 1966; Rio de Janeiro

Athalício Theodoro Pithan (1898–1966) was the first native bishop of the Anglican Episcopal Church of Brazil. He was the author of several religious books in Portuguese.
