= James W. F. Carman =

James Walmesley Frederic Carman (September 26, 1903 - November 29, 1979) was bishop of the Episcopal Diocese of Oregon, serving from 1958 to 1974. He received a BD degree from Seabury Theological Seminary in 1930. He was consecrated Bishop Coadjutor of Oregon on February 7, 1956.
