= Archie Henry Crowley =

American bishop (died 1996)

Archie Henry Crowley (died September 30, 1996) was a bishop in the Episcopal Church, serving as suffragan in the Diocese of Michigan from 1954 to 1972.
