= Egmont M. Krischke =

Anglican bishop in Brazil

Egmont Machado Krischke was first primate of the Anglican Episcopal Church of Brazil, serving from 1965 to 1971. The Seminário Teológico Dom Egmont Machado Krischke (SETEK) is named after him. He was consecrated on March 12, 1950.

Egmont Machado Krischke, I Missionary Bishop of Southwestern Brazil; II Missionary Bishop of Southern Brazil, 1955; Primate of the Anglican Church of Brasil, 1965; died, 1971.

Egmont Machado Krischke was consecrated on March 12, 1950, by: Louis Chester Melcher (475), I Missionary Bishop of Southern Brazil; John Boyd Bentley (379), retired Missionary Bishop of Alaska; and, Athalicio Theodore Pithan (422), Missionary Bishop of Southern Brazil.
