= John Wyatt (bishop) =

John Raymond "Jack" Wyatt ( October 14, 1913 – May 23, 2004) was bishop of the Episcopal Diocese of Spokane from 1967 to 1978.

Episcopal Church (USA) titles
Preceded by Russell Sturgis Hubbard	Bishop of Spokane; 1967–1978	Succeeded by Leigh A. Wallace Jr.
