= Reginald Heber Gooden =

American missionary

Reginald Heber Gooden (March 22, 1910 – February 11, 2003) was a missionary bishop of The Episcopal Church, serving in Panama and the Canal Zone and later in Louisiana. His father, Robert Burton Gooden, was also a bishop.
