= Louis Chester Melcher =

Missionary bishop of the Anglican Episcopal Church

Louis Chester Melcher (August 3, 1898 - September 21, 1965) was a missionary bishop from The Episcopal Church to what became the Anglican Episcopal Church of Brazil, serving there from 1948 to 1958. He was born in Baraboo, Wisconsin and studied at the University of Wisconsin–Madison and at Sewanee: The University of the South. He served as priest in the Panama Canal Zone and in the United States. He was buried at Trinity Episcopal Cathedral in Columbia, South Carolina, where he had been the rector. He had been consecrated there as coadjutor bishop of Southern Brazil on February 5, 1948.
