= Edmund Knox Sherrill =

American Episcopal Church bishop

Edmund Knox Sherrill (died 2016) was a missionary bishop in The Episcopal Church who served in Brazil. He studied at Episcopal Theological School after serving in the U.S. Army for two years during World War II and graduating from Yale College. He was ordained a bishop on 25 January 1959 in Rio de Janeiro, with his father, retired Presiding Bishop Henry Knox Sherrill, serving as chief consecrator. As bishop of Central Brazil, which covered most of the country, he served until his retirement in 1984.
