= David Shoji Tani =

Japanese Anglican bishop

The Right Reverend David Shoji Tani (谷昌二) was the bishop of the Anglican Diocese of Okinawa in the Anglican Church in Japan. He was consecrated to the episcopate on April 25, 1998.
