= Troy Beatty =

Bishop co-adjutor of Tennessee

Troy Daniel Beatty (November 12, 1866 - April 23, 1922) was bishop co-adjutor of Tennessee in The Episcopal Church, serving from September 18, 1919, to his death.
