= Hector Monterroso =

Anglican bishop

The Right Reverend Héctor Monterroso Gonzales
- Bishop of Costa Rica
- Church: Anglican Church in Central America

Orders
- Consecration: June 7, 2003

Héctor Monterroso Gonzales is an Anglican bishop. Originally from Guatemala, he became bishop of Costa Rica in 2003. In 2017, he became assistant bishop in the Episcopal Diocese of Texas.
