= Hugo Blankingship =

Alexander Hugo Blankingship (1894 – July 21, 1975) was bishop of the Episcopal Church of Cuba from 1939 until his resignation on May 21, 1961. He was born in Richmond, Virginia.

An alumnus of the University of Richmond and Yale Divinity School, he was a Commander of the Most Excellent Order of the British Empire. He married Mary Antoinette Woodward (1903-1986) in 1929. He died in Richmond.
