= H. Irving Mayson =

Henry Irving Mayson (February 1, 1925 – December 3, 1995) was a suffragan bishop of the Episcopal Diocese of Michigan, serving from 1976 to 1992. He was born in Cleveland, Ohio, and died in Ann Arbor, Michigan.

The Rt. Rev. H. Irving Mayson, retired Suffragan Bishop of Michigan, died Dec. 3 in an Ann Arbor hospital. He was 70. Bishop Mayson was consecrated in 1976, and remained in this ministry until his retirement in 1992.

Born and raised in Cleveland, Ohio, he graduated from St. Augustine's College (N.C.) and Bexley Hall seminary. He was ordained to the diaconate and priesthood in 1951, and served as priest-in-charge of St. Philip's Church, Akron, Ohio, from 1951 to 1969. He was Archdeacon of Michigan from 1970 until his election in 1976.

Bishop Mayson was a founding member and a member of the national board of the Union of Black Episcopalians and the Economic Justice Committee of the national church, and the board of trustees of St. Paul's College, Lawrenceville, Va. He also created the Mayson Scholarship Foundation, which assists Detroit high school students who wish to study at St. Andrew's Academy, Sewanee, Tenn.
