= Sumner F. D. Walters =

American Bishop

Sumner Francis Dudley Walters (May 20, 1898 - February 11, 1979) was second bishop of the Episcopal Diocese of San Joaquin, serving from 1944 to 1969. He was a graduate of Princeton University in the Class of 1919 and received an M.A. from Columbia University in 1921.

He married Evelyn Turpin Walters with whom he had two children.
