= Laish Boyd =

Bahamian bishop

Laish Zane Boyd is the current Bishop of Nassau and the Bahamas, a diocese of the Anglican Communion.

Religious titles
| Preceded by Drexel Gomez | Bishop of Nassau; 2009–present | Incumbent |
