= Episcopal Diocese of the Great Lakes =

Episcopal Church diocese in the US

Coordinates: 43.5°N 85.5°W

Diocese of the Great Lakes

Location
- Country: United States
- Territory: The Western and northern two-thirds of the Eastern portions of Michigan excluding the area surrounding Detroit.
- Ecclesiastical province: Province V

Statistics
- Congregations: 105 (2025)
- Members: 9,445 (2025)

Information
- Denomination: Episcopal Church
- Established: 2024

Current leadership
- Bishop: Anne Hodges-Copple (Assisting Bishop) Zachary C.K. Nyein (Bishop Elect)

Map
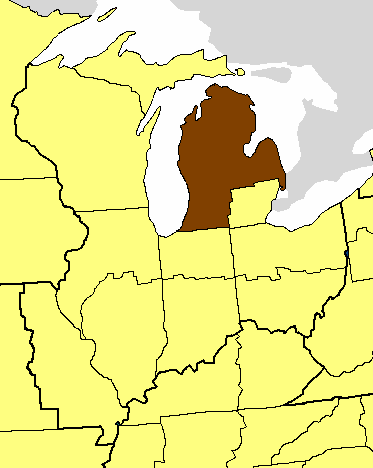
- Location of the Episcopal Diocese of the Great Lakes

Website
- greatlakesepiscopal.org/

The Episcopal Diocese of the Great Lakes is the Episcopal diocese in the western half and northern two-thirds of the eastern half of the Lower Peninsula of Michigan. The diocese was founded in 2024 by the juncture of the Episcopal Diocese of Western Michigan and the Episcopal Diocese of Eastern Michigan. This canonical arrangement was approved by a special joint convention of the prior dioceses on March 16, 2024 in Grand Blanc, Michigan.

In 2025, the diocese reported average Sunday attendance (ASA) of 3,706 persons. It reported plate and pledge financial support of $11,941,941 in 2025.

The diocese is governed by the Constitution and Canons of the Episcopal Diocese of the Great Lakes adopted by its first convention on October 19, 2024 and amended at the second convention on October 24, 2025. At its third convention held October 23-24 of 2026, the diocese elected its first bishop as a newly united body. The Reverend Zachary Nyein of St. Barts Church in New York City was chosen among 4 candidates to the office. His tenure is set begin on May 8, 2027.

== Bishops ==
=== Bishops of Western Michigan ===
1. George D. Gillespie (1875–1909)
2. John N. McCormick (1909–1937)
3. Lewis Bliss Whittemore (1937–1953)
4. Dudley B. McNeil (1953–1959)
5. Charles E. Bennison Sr. (1960–1984)
6. Howard Meeks (1984–1988)
7. Edward L. Lee (1989–2002)
8. Robert R. Gepert (2002–2013)
9. Whayne M. Hougland, Jr. (2013–2021)
10. Prince G. Singh (2022 - 2023, Provisional)

=== Bishops of Eastern Michigan ===
1. Edwin M. Leidel, Jr. (1996–2006)
2. Todd Ousley (2006–2017)
3. Catherine Waynick (2017-2019, Provisional)
4. Whayne M. Hougland Jr. (2019-2021, Provisional)
5. Prince G. Singh (2022-2023, Provisional)

=== Bishops of the Great Lakes ===
1. The Rt. Rev. Gladstone B. Adams III, Assisting Bishop (2024–January 30, 2025)
2. The Rt. Rev. Anne Hodges-Copple, Assisting Bishop (August 15, 2025 - Present)
