= Christ Church Detroit =

Historic church in Michigan, United States

- Christ Church of the City of Detroit
- Christ Church Detroit
- Location: 960 East Jefferson Ave. Detroit, Michigan
- Country: United States
- Denomination: Episcopal
- Churchmanship: Broad Church
- Website: christcd.org

History
- Founded: 1845; 181 years ago
- Dedication: Christ the King

Architecture
- Architect: Gordon W. Lloyd
- Architectural type: American Gothic
- Completed: 1864

Specifications
- Materials: limestone, sandstone, butternut

Administration
- Province: Province V
- Diocese: Michigan

Clergy
- Bishop: Bonnie Perry
- Rector: Emily Williams Guffey
- Christ Church Detroit
- U.S. National Register of Historic Places
- Michigan State Historic Site
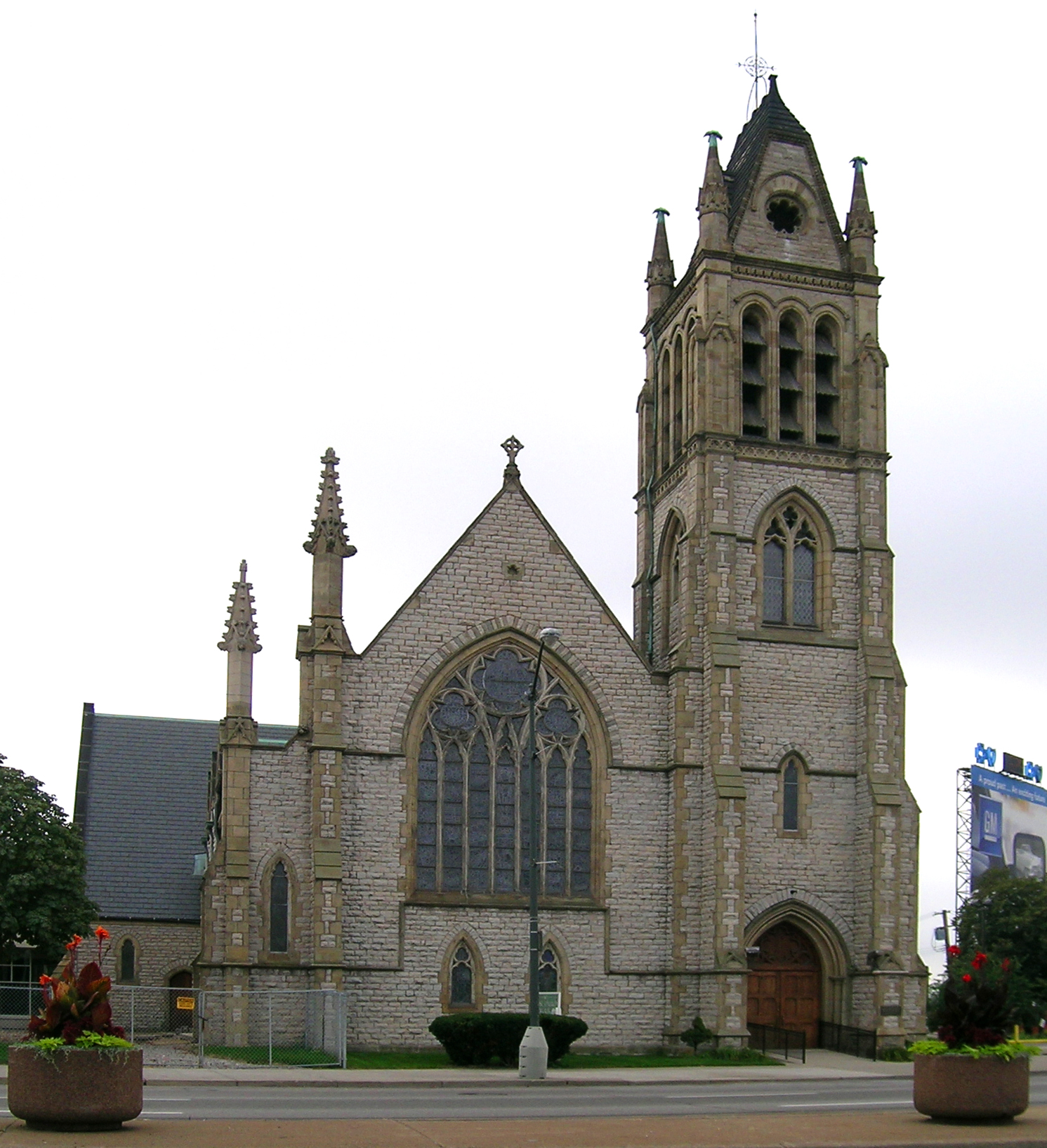
- Location: 960 East Jefferson Avenue; Detroit, Michigan
- Coordinates: 42°19′57″N 83°2′5″W
- Built: 1860-1863
- Architect: Gordon W. Lloyd
- Architectural style: Gothic Revival
- NRHP reference No.: 71000423

Significant dates
- Added to NRHP: March 11, 1971
- Designated MSHS: November 6, 1970

Christ Church Detroit is an Episcopal church located at 960 East Jefferson Avenue in Detroit, Michigan. It is also known as Old Christ Church, Detroit. It is the oldest Protestant church in Michigan still located on its original site. It was designated a Michigan State Historic Site in 1970 and listed on the National Register of Historic Places in 1971. The church is part of the Episcopal Diocese of Michigan.

In 2015, the church reported 457 members; in 2023, it reported 258 members. No membership statistics were reported in 2024 national parochial reports. Plate and pledge financial support reported by the church in 2024 was $448,081. Average Sunday Attendance (ASA) reported in 2024 was 92 persons. This was a relative decrease from ASA of 118 persons reported in 2020.

== History ==
Brothers Robert (Jr.) and William Stead ran a wholesale grocery business at the present site of Christ Church until the year 1844. Christ Church Detroit was founded by a group of Episcopalians in 1845, who decided that St. Paul's Church (now St. Paul's Cathedral) was too crowded. The founders built a small wooden church, designed by Lieutenant Montgomery C. Meigs, as its first place of worship. Fifteen years later, plans were laid for a new building on the same site. In 1861, a chapel was constructed near the original structure for use while a larger church was constructed. The present church, designed by Gordon W. Lloyd, was completed in 1864.

== Construction ==
The church is built in an American Gothic style, using limestone and sandstone; a massive belfry with a squared-off Germanic roof dominates the front facade. The interior boasts transepts with galleries and hammerbeam trusses supporting the roof. All interior woodwork, save the roof, is made from local butternut. There are two Tiffany windows in the church, with more windows designed by other famous glass companies such as Franz Meyer and Company and J. Wippell and Co.

== Current use ==
The Christ Church building has been continuously by an Episcopalian congregation since its construction. The current Rector is the Rev. Emily Williams Guffey. The congregation describes themselves as "a contemporary, well-educated, multi-racial, multi-ethnic congregation carrying out Christ's mission in the world around us, strengthened, nurtured, and guided by the presence of the Holy Spirit." The next-door Sibley House serves as offices.

== Gallery ==
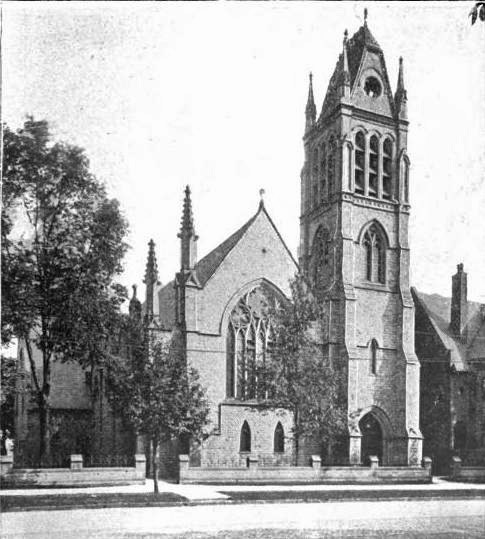
Christ Church in 1899

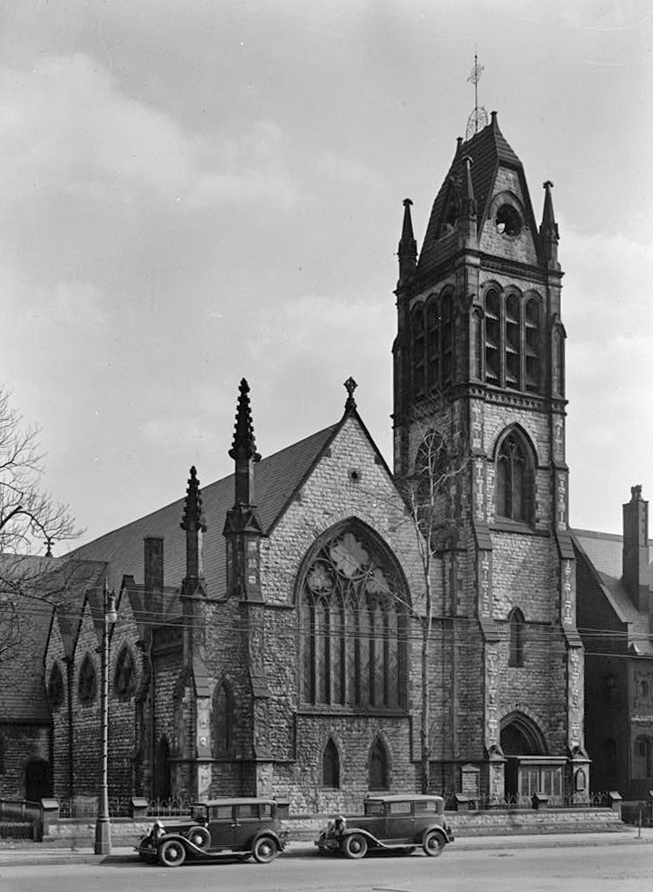
Christ Church in 1934
