= Whayne =

Whayne is a given name. Notable people with the given name include:

- Whayne M. Hougland Jr., American Episcopal bishop
- Whayne Wilson (1975–2005), Costa Rican footballer
