= Episcopal Diocese of Eastern Michigan =

Diocese of the Episcopal Church in the United States

Coordinates: 44°N 84°W

Diocese of Eastern Michigan Diœcesis Michiganensis Orientis

Location
- Country: United States
- Ecclesiastical province: V (Midwest)

Statistics
- Parishes: 43 (2022)
- Members: 3,362 (2023)

Information
- Denomination: Episcopal Church
- Established: October 28, 1994
- Dissolved: June 28, 2024

Map
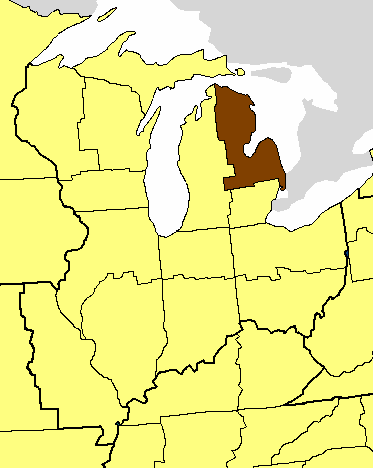
- Location of the Diocese of Eastern Michigan

Website
- www.eastmich.org

The Episcopal Diocese of Eastern Michigan was an Episcopal diocese in the northern two-thirds of the eastern half of the Lower Peninsula of Michigan, not including the greater Detroit area, which is in the Episcopal Diocese of Michigan.

The diocese was headquartered in Saginaw, Michigan. It was created from the Episcopal Diocese of Michigan in 1994. There were 50 separate parishes operating within the diocese.

At a Special Convention held on March 16, 2024, in Grand Blanc, there was a vote in favor of joining the Episcopal Diocese of Western Michigan to establish the Episcopal Diocese of The Great Lakes. This junction was approved by the General Convention on June 28, 2024.

== List of bishops ==
Bishops of Eastern Michigan
From	Until	Incumbent	Notes
1996	2006	Edwin M. Leidel, Jr.	Edwin "Ed" Max Leidel, Junior (born 1938, Baltimore, MD); elected March 16, 1996; consecrated September 1996; installed September 7, 1996; retired December 30, 2006; elected Provisional Bishop of Eau Claire August 28, 2010.
2006	2017	Todd Ousley	Steven Todd Ousley; elected coadjutor May 6 and consecrated September 9, 2006; succeeded December 30, 2006; installed January 7, 2007.
2017	2019	Catherine Waynick	Bishop Waynick was elected Provisional Bishop on October 21, 2017
2019	2021	Whayne M. Hougland Jr.	Bishop Hougland was elected Provisional Bishop on October 19, 2019
2021	September 28, 2023	Prince G. Singh	Bishop Singh was elected Provisional Bishop on October 21, 2021
