= George Gillespie (disambiguation) =

George Gillespie (1613–1648) was a Scottish theologian.

George Gillespie may also refer to:

- George Alexander Gillespie (1872–1956), Ontario politician
- George Lewis Gillespie Jr. (1841–1913), Medal of Honor recipient
- George Gillespie (footballer) (1859–1900), Scottish footballer (Rangers FC, Queen's Park FC and Scotland)
- George D. Gillespie (1810–1909), bishop of Western Michigan in the Episcopal Church
