= R. Stewart Wood =

American bishop (1934–2023)

The Right Reverend Raymond Stewart Wood D.Min.
- Bishop of Michigan
- Church: Episcopal Church
- Diocese: Michigan
- Elected: May 7, 1988
- In office: 1990–2000
- Predecessor: H. Coleman McGehee Jr.
- Successor: Wendell Gibbs
- Previous post: Coadjutor Bishop of Michigan (1988–1990)

Orders
- Ordination: 1959
- Consecration: October 15, 1988 by John T. Walker

Personal details
- Born: June 25, 1934 Detroit, Michigan, U.S.
- Died: July 30, 2023 (aged 89) Hanover, New Hampshire, U.S.
- Denomination: Anglican
- Parents: Raymond & Marjorie Wood
- Spouse: Kristin Miller
- Children: 3
- Education: Dartmouth College, Virginia Theological Seminary, and Ball State University

Raymond Stewart Wood Jr. (June 25, 1934 – July 30, 2023) was a bishop in the Episcopal Church in the United States of America. He served the Diocese of Michigan from 1990 to 2000 as its ninth diocesan bishop.

== Personal life ==
Raymond Stewart Wood Jr. was born and raised in Detroit, Michigan, and graduated from Dartmouth College in 1956 and Virginia Theological Seminary in 1959, as well as Ball State University with a master's degree in counseling and sociology in 1973. He was married to Kristin Wood, with whom he had three children. Wood died in Hanover, New Hampshire on July 30, 2023, at the age of 89.

== Ministry ==
Wood served as curate of St. Paul's in Columbus, Indiana, vicar of the Brown County Mission in Bean Blossom, Indiana, associate and rector of Church of All Saints in Indianapolis, and rector of Christ Church in Glendale, Ohio. During this time, he served on various diocesan councils and standing committees, and was a deputy to General Convention from 1970 to 1976 and in 1982. He also directed a diocesan casework and counseling agency in Indianapolis. Wood was elected Bishop Coadjutor on the fifth ballot during a special election held during the Episcopal Diocese of Michigan's 1988 diocesan convention, held at the Cathedral Church of St. Paul in Detroit on May 7, 1988. He succeeded as diocesan on January 1, 1990.

In late 1994, he received media attention for ordaining a lesbian, Jennifer Walters, as a priest at Church of the Incarnation in Pittsfield Township, Michigan. He was also in attendance for the consecration of Bishop Gene Robinson in 2003, the first openly gay Bishop within the Episcopal Church.

Wood took a public position against the hiring of "permanent replacements" by the Detroit newspapers during the Detroit Newspaper Strike. He joined auxiliary Catholic bishop Thomas Gumbleton, Rabbi Irwin Gronor of Congregation Shaarey Zedek in Southfield, Michigan, and Rabbi M. Robert Syme of Temple Israel in West Bloomfield, Michigan in taking the position following a meeting the faith leaders held on August 15, 1995.

On September 17, 2000, he delivered the Pentecost XIV sermon at the Washington National Cathedral. On January 12, 2015, he joined approximately 100 other bishops of the Episcopal Church, including Presiding Bishop Katharine Jefferts Schori, in sending a statement to the United States Congress and the White House in support of President Barack Obama's executive order offering relief from deportation to immigrants to the United States.

== See also ==
- List of bishops of the Episcopal Church in the United States of America

Episcopal Church (USA) titles
Preceded by H. Coleman McGehee Jr.	9th Bishop of Michigan; 1990–November 4, 2000	Succeeded by Wendell Gibbs
