= Wendell Gibbs =

American bishop

The Right Reverend Wendell Gibbs SCP
- Bishop of Michigan
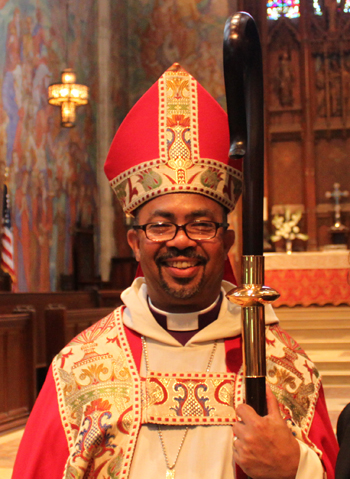
- Gibbs in 2012
- Church: Episcopal Church
- Diocese: Michigan
- Elected: October 2, 1999
- In office: 2000–2020
- Predecessor: R. Stewart Wood
- Successor: Bonnie Perry
- Previous post: Bishop Coadjutor of Michigan (1999–2000)

Orders
- Ordination: December 1987
- Consecration: February 5, 2000 by Arthur Benjamin Williams Jr.

Personal details
- Born: March 21, 1954 (age 72) Washington, D.C., United States
- Denomination: Anglican
- Residence: Lewis Center, Ohio, US
- Spouse: Karlah Ambrose York (m. 1989)
- Education: Towson University; Seabury-Western Theological Seminary

Ordination history of Wendell Gibbs
History
Episcopal consecration
- Consecrated by: Arthur Benjamin Williams, Jr.
Episcopal succession
Bishops consecrated by Wendell Gibbs as principal consecrator
- Steven Miller: October 18, 2003
- Mark Hollingsworth: April 17, 2004
- Todd Ousley: September 9, 2006
- Kristin Uffelman White: February 17, 2024

Wendell Nathaniel Gibbs Jr. SCP (born March 21, 1954) is a bishop in the Episcopal Church in the United States of America. He served the Diocese of Michigan between 2000 and 2020 as its tenth diocesan bishop.

== Personal life ==
Gibbs was born, on March 21, 1954, and grew up in Washington, DC. He earned a bachelor's degree in business administration from Towson University. After graduating from Towson in 1977, he worked several years at various businesses.

He enrolled in Seabury-Western Theological Seminary in 1984, and graduated in 1987 with a Master of Divinity degree. He has since served as President of the Alumni/ae Association and as a member of the Board of Trustees of the seminary, including a term as Vice President of the Board.

Gibbs married with his wife, Karlah Ambrose York, on August 19, 1989, and lives with her in Lewis Center, Ohio. He has two stepchildren and two grandchildren.

== Ministry ==
Prior to college, Gibbs became a postulant in the Roman Catholic Order of the Most Holy Trinity. For three years, he took classes at St. Mary's Seminary and University and lived at a monastery in Maryland.

He joined the Episcopal Church while working for various businesses after graduating from Towson University. He was ordained a deacon in June 1987 and a priest in December 1987.

Gibbs served as curate at Emmanuel Church in Rockford, Illinois, part of the Episcopal Diocese of Chicago, from 1987 until 1989. He then served in the Episcopal Diocese of Central New York as associate rector of Grace Church in Utica, New York from 1989 to 1991, and then rector of the Four Point Parish in Oriskany Falls, New York from 1991 to 1993.

He became rector of St. Andrew's in Cincinnati, Ohio, in 1993. Gibbs served as Dean of the Ohio River Deanery in the Episcopal Diocese of Southern Ohio from 1996 until 1999. Within the diocese, he also served on the Diocesan Council, the Board of Examining Chaplains, the Commission on Congregational Life, the Liturgy and Music Commission, the Human Sexuality Task Force, and as Assistant Secretary of Diocesan Convention. During this time, Gibbs served the national church as Deputy to the 1997 General Convention and as President of the Southern Ohio Chapter of the Union of Black Episcopalians.

Gibbs remained at St. Andrew's until being elected bishop coadjutor of the Diocese of Michigan on October 2, 1999. Gibbs was consecrated bishop on February 5, 2000, and became diocesan bishop when on November 4, 2000, following the retirement of R. Stewart Wood. He is the first African American to serve as bishop of the diocese.

As Bishop, he has served as the President of Province V and as a member of the House of Bishops Committee on Racism. He continues to serve as a member of the Executive Council of The Episcopal Church and the Joint Nominating Committee for the Election of the Presiding Bishop.

He has served the national church as a member of the Recruitment, Training & Deployment Committee of the National Office of Black Ministries, a member of Black Leaders and Diocesan Executives, a mentor for the Organization of Black Episcopal Seminarians, and as a member of the Standing Commission for Liturgy and Music.

Gibbs has previously served the community as a board member for Positive Beginnings Teen Services, Justice Watch, AMOS Project, Melrose Branch YMCA, People Working Cooperatively, and president of the board of Episcopal Community Services, Detroit. He has also been a member of the Episcopal Retirement Homes Church Relations Committee, the Evanston Neighborhood Coalition, and the Evanston Weed and Seed Initiative. Gibbs currently serves as co-chair of Michigan for Marriage, and as president of the board of Canterbury House at the University of Michigan in Ann Arbor. He also currently serves on the boards of Mariners Inn in Detroit, and the National Conference for Community and Justice, Michigan Region.

== See also ==
- List of Episcopal bishops of the United States
- Historical list of the Episcopal bishops of the United States

Episcopal Church (USA) titles
Preceded by R. Stewart Wood	10th Bishop of Michigan; 2000–2020	Succeeded by Bonnie Perry
