= Hougland =

Hougland is a surname. Notable people with the surname include:

- Bill Hougland (1930–2017), American basketball player
- Jeff Hougland (born 1978), American mixed martial artist
- Whayne M. Hougland Jr., American bishop
