= Diocese of Michigan =

Episcopal Church diocese in the US

Coordinates: 42.5°N 83.5°W

Diocese of Michigan Diœcesis Michiganensis
- Seal of the Diocese of Michigan

Location
- Country: United States
- Territory: Detroit Metropolitan Area and adjacent regions as far west as Lansing, Jackson, and Hillsdale
- Ecclesiastical province: Province V

Statistics
- Congregations: 70 (2024)
- Members: 13,311 (2023)

Information
- Denomination: Episcopal Church
- Established: September 8, 1832
- Cathedral: St Paul's Cathedral

Current leadership
- Bishop: Bonnie Perry

Map
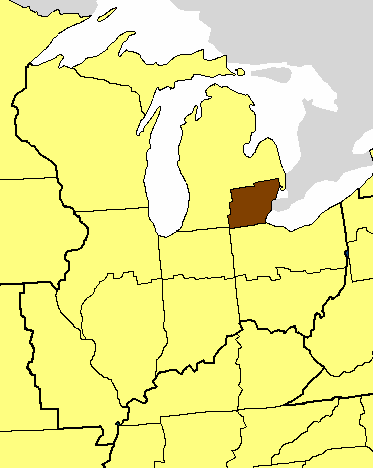

Website
- edomi.org

The Episcopal Diocese of Michigan is the Episcopal diocese comprising 70 congregations in the southeast part of Michigan. In 2024, the diocese reported average Sunday attendance (ASA) of 3,893 persons, down from 6,284 reported in 2016. The most recent membership statistics (2023) showed 13,311 members, a relative decline from 17,493 reported in 2015. No membership statistics were reported in 2024 national parochial reports.

The diocese traces its roots to the founding of St. Paul's, Detroit in 1824. It became a diocese of the Episcopal Church in 1836, one year before the State of Michigan entered the Union. Initially encompassing the entire Michigan Territory, it split several times to reflect a growing population, and now comprises only the densely populated southeastern portion of the state.

St. Paul's, Detroit was formally designated the cathedral of the diocese in 1912.

== Location ==
At its foundation, one year before Michigan achieved statehood, the Diocese encompassed all of Michigan. As the church grew, the bishops found it difficult to administer such a large area, and the parishes farther from Detroit desired a bishop closer to their own areas and more attuned to their local needs.

To address these concerns, the diocese has divided three times. In 1875, the western half of the Lower Peninsula became the Diocese of Western Michigan. In 1895, the Upper Peninsula became the Diocese of Marquette (later renamed Diocese of Northern Michigan). Finally in 1995, the northeastern Lower Peninsula, Saginaw Valley, and Thumb areas (the northern two-thirds of its then remaining territory) became the Diocese of Eastern Michigan. The Dioceses of Eastern and Western Michigan were formally united in 2024 to become the Episcopal Diocese of the Great Lakes.

As a result of these divisions, the current Diocese of Michigan includes only the Detroit Metropolitan Area and adjacent regions as far west as Lansing, Jackson, and Hillsdale.

Officially, the diocesan boundaries are the Counties of Hillsdale, Lenawee, Monroe, Jackson, Washtenaw, Wayne, Ingham, Livingston, Oakland (except for Holly Township), Macomb and that portion of Clinton County south of Price Road

== History ==
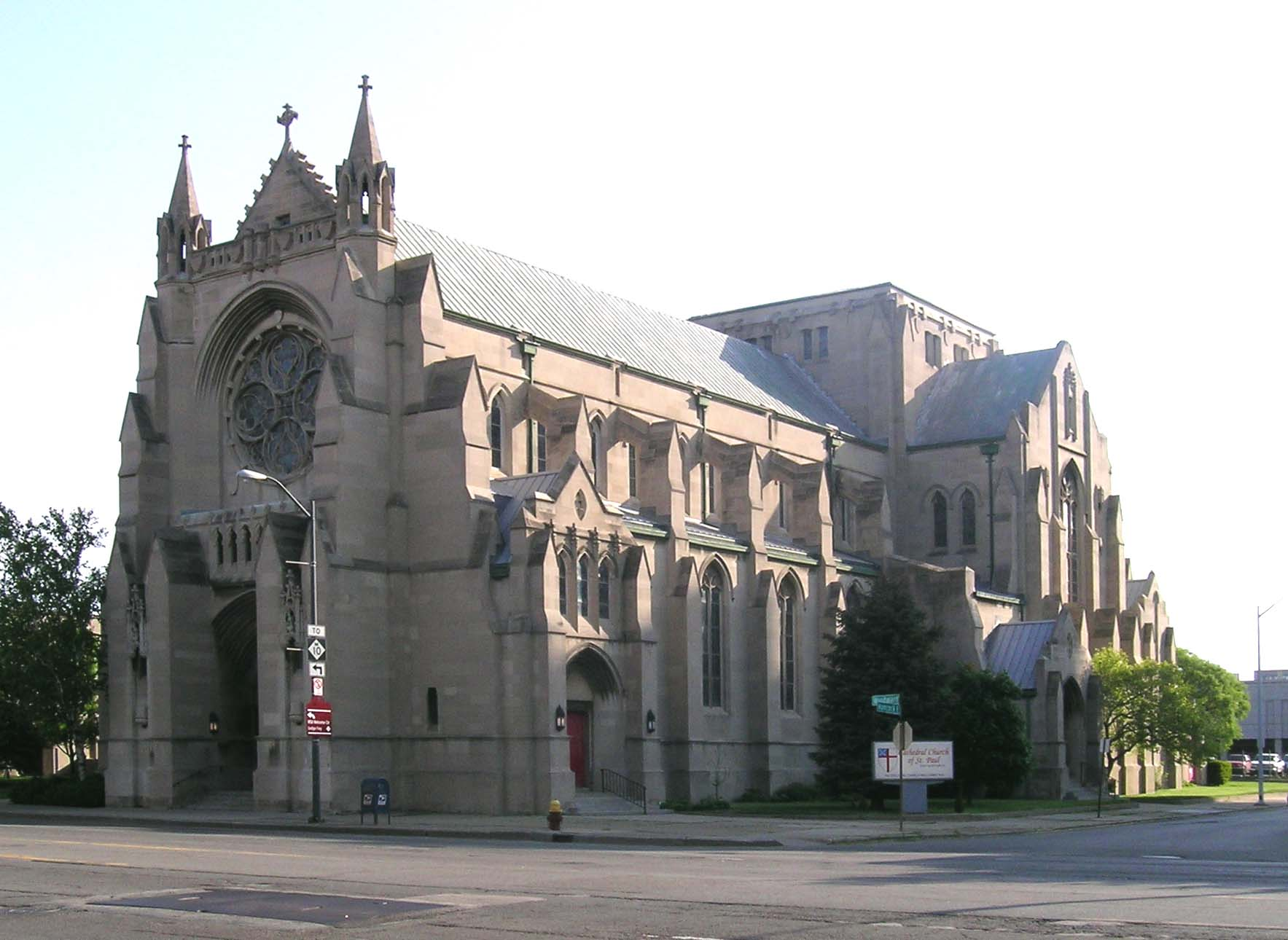
Cathedral Church of Saint Paul on Woodward Avenue in Detroit, Michigan.

Logo of the Diocese of Michigan

The Episcopal Diocese of Michigan was organized In the fall of 1832 by parishes in Detroit, Ann Arbor, Troy, Monroe, Ypsilanti and Tecumseh. It became the 21st diocese of the Episcopal Church of the United States. From its beginning, St. Paul's Church in Detroit (the current Cathedral) served, initially informally until the formal designation in 1912, as the see of the diocese, and the early bishops served as rector of St. Paul's.

In the 1800s, the diocese focused on rapidly spreading the gospel to the region. As early as the 1840s, the church began to develop urban missions in Detroit to African Americans (St. Matthew's) and laborers (Mariners’ Church). The 1850s saw the development of missions in the Saginaw Valley and Upper Peninsula. Supporting churches in poor farming areas was a focus during this period.

The major emphasis of the diocese changed in the 1900s as the automobile industry began to prosper in Michigan. Throughout the century the financial stability of the diocese were closely tied to the development and decline of the industry in the Detroit area. The rapid rise in Detroit's wealth and power in the 1910s and 1920s were reflected in a diocese that became one of the largest and most influential in The Episcopal Church. The suburbanization of the 1940s and 1950s led to a focus on the physical expansion in the diocese with the addition of new church buildings. The decline of Detroit in the 1970s and 1980s saw the diocese cutting back and closing parishes.

Early in the 20th century, Bishop Charles D. Williams led the diocese to discuss the church's responsibility to the labor movement. Later Bishops Richard S. M. Emrich and Harry Coleman McGehee, Jr. began community activism around the issues of civil rights, peace, and justice. Beginning in the 1950s, the diocese debated the role of women, and later gays and lesbians, in the church.

== Governance ==
Since 1920 the executive council (since 1995 called diocesan council) has met between conventions to continue its policy-making role. The standing committee provides advice and counsel for the bishop. Since 1875 the trustees of the diocese have managed the diocesan assets. The chancellor has since 1904 provided the bishop with legal counsel. The parishes in the diocese have been divided into regional groupings called at various times convocations, archdeaconries, area councils, and currently deaneries, that have varied over the years in number, names, and responsibilities.

=== Bishops ===
The immediate past bishop was Wendell Gibbs, one of only a few African-American bishops in the Episcopal Church. The current bishop is Bonnie Perry. Its first bishop was Samuel Allen McCoskry, who served 1836–1878.

1. Samuel Allen McCoskry (1836 - 1878)
2. Samuel Smith Harris (1879 - 1889)
3. Thomas Frederick Davies, Sr. (1889 - 1905)
4. Charles D. Williams (1906 - 1923)
5. Herman Page (1924 - 1939)
6. Frank W. Creighton (1940 - 1948)
7. Richard S. M. Emrich (1948 - 1973)
8. Harry Coleman McGehee, Jr. (1973 - 1990)
9. R. Stewart Wood (1990 - 2000)
10. Wendell Gibbs (2000 - 2020)
11. Bonnie Perry (2020-)
