= Richard S. M. Emrich =

American bishop

The Right Reverend Richard Stanley Merrill Emrich Ph.D., S.T.D., LL.D., D.D. CBE
- Bishop of Michigan
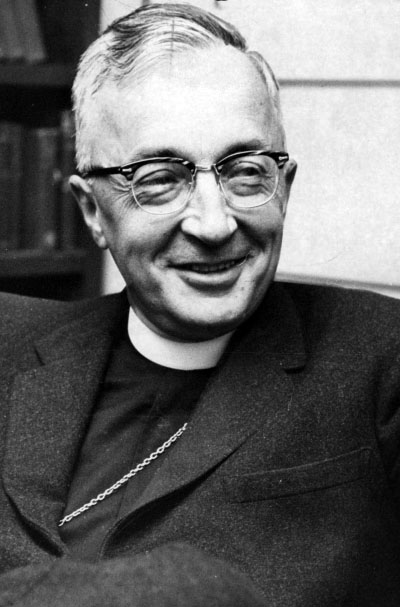
- Church: Episcopal Church
- Diocese: Michigan
- Elected: January 28, 1948
- In office: 1948–1973
- Predecessor: Frank W. Creighton
- Successor: H. Coleman McGehee Jr.
- Previous posts: Suffragan Bishop of Michigan (1946-1948); Coadjutor Bishop of Michigan (1948)

Orders
- Ordination: June 1938 by Henry Knox Sherrill
- Consecration: June 11, 1946 by Henry St. George Tucker

Personal details
- Born: March 11, 1910 Mardin, Turkey
- Died: October 31, 1997 (aged 87) Rome, New York, United States
- Buried: St Paul's Cathedral
- Denomination: Anglican
- Parents: Richard Stanley Merrill Emrich & Jeanette Wallace
- Spouse: Beatrice Anne Littlehales
- Children: 2
- Education: Brown University, the Episcopal Theological School

Richard Stanley Merrill Emrich (March 11, 1910 – October 31, 1997) was the seventh bishop of the Episcopal Diocese of Michigan.

== Biography ==
He was born in Mardin in the Ottoman Empire to American Christian missionary parents, and educated at Brown University, and the Episcopal Theological School in Cambridge, Massachusetts. He was ordained to the diaconate in October 1936 and to the priesthood in June 1938, after which he served parishes in Connecticut and Massachusetts.

== Education ==
Emrich was a student at Phillips Academy from 1923 till 1927. He then studied at Brown University and graduated with a Bachelor of Arts in 1932. the same university awarded him a Doctor of Law in 1949. He also attended the Episcopal Theological School between 1932 and 1933 for postgraduate studies. He earned a Bachelor of Divinity from the Union Theological Seminary in 1935. He also graduated with a Doctor of Philosophy from the University of Marburg in 1937. He was awarded an honorary Doctor of Sacred Theology from Kenyon College in 1948, and a Doctor of Divinity from Huron College in 1950.

== Family ==
Emrich was husband to Beatrice Emrich (UK), and brother to Duncan Emrich (Washington DC). He was father to Richard Emrich (Baroda, MI) and Frederick Ernest Emrich (North Haven, ME).

== Bishop ==
Emrich was elected suffragan bishop of Michigan on March 26, 1946; and then as coadjutor bishop on January 28, 1948, succeeding as diocesan on March 1, 1948, where he served till 1973. He was made Honorary Commander of the Order of the British Empire in 1958. He was succeeded by H. Coleman McGehee Jr., who was elected in May 1971.

The Emrich Retreat Center at Parishfield, located in Brighton, Michigan and owned by the Episcopal Diocese of Michigan was renamed in honor of Emrich.

== See also ==
- List of bishops of the Episcopal Church in the United States of America

Episcopal Church (USA) titles
Preceded by Frank W. Creighton	7th Bishop of Michigan; 1948 - 1973	Succeeded by H. Coleman McGehee Jr.
