= Samuel Smith Harris =

American bishop (1841–1888)

The Right Reverend Samuel Smith Harris D.D., LL.D.
- Bishop of Michigan
- Church: Episcopal Church
- Diocese: Michigan
- Elected: June 7, 1879
- In office: 1879–1888
- Predecessor: Samuel A. McCoskry
- Successor: Thomas Frederick Davies Sr.

Orders
- Ordination: June 30, 1869 by Richard Hooker Wilmer
- Consecration: September 17, 1879 by Richard Hooker Wilmer

Personal details
- Born: September 14, 1841 Autauga County, Alabama, U.S.
- Died: August 21, 1888 (aged 46) London, England
- Buried: Elmwood Cemetery, Detroit
- Denomination: Anglican
- Parents: Buckner Harris & Sarah McKeithen
- Spouse: Mary Gindrat Pickett
- Children: 7
- Education: University of Alabama

Samuel Smith Harris (September 14, 1841 – August 21, 1888) was the second Bishop of Michigan in the Episcopal Church in the United States of America.

== Biography ==
Harris was born on September 14, 1841, in Autauga County, Alabama. He graduated in law from the University of Alabama in 1859. Later he enlisted in the 3rd Regiment Alabama Infantry in 1861. On December 19, the same year, Harris married Mary Gindrat Pickett with whom he had seven children. After the war he left for New York to practice supreme law. He also commenced his studies in theology after which he was ordained deacon on February 10, 1869, and then priest on June 30, 1869, on both occasions by Bishop Richard Hooker Wilmer of Alabama. He served in several churches in Alabama, Georgia, Louisiana and Illinois. He graduated with a Doctor of Divinity in 1874 from the College of William & Mary and his LLD from the University of Alabama in 1879.

== Episcopacy ==
In 1879 Harris was elected Bishop of Michigan. He was consecrated on September 17, 1879, in St Paul's Cathedral in Detroit. He served as the first editor of The Living Church with John Fulton, and wrote several books, including The Dignity of Man, Christianity and Civil Society, Thoughts on Life, Death, and Immortality, and Shelton, a novel.

== Death ==
In 1888 he traveled to England to preach in Winchester Cathedral. Whilst there he suffered a stroke and died a few days later on August 21, 1888. His funeral took place in Winchester Cathedral and presided by Edward White Benson Primate of All England and Archbishop of Canterbury. His body was brought back to Detroit and buried in Woodmere Cemetery in Detroit, however he was exhumed and transferred to Elmwood Cemetery in 1900.

Episcopal Church (USA) titles
Preceded by Samuel A. McCoskry	Bishop of Michigan; 1879–1888	Succeeded by Thomas Frederick Davies Sr.
