= Arthur Benjamin Williams Jr. =

American bishop

Arthur B. Williams Jr.
- Bishop Suffragan of Ohio, Retired
- Province: The Episcopal Church
- Diocese: Ohio
- Term ended: Incumbent

Orders
- Ordination: March 27, 1965
- Consecration: 1986

Personal details
- Born: June 25, 1935 (age 91) Providence, Rhode Island

Ordination history of Arthur Benjamin Williams Jr.
History
Diaconal ordination
- Ordained by: John S. Higgins
Priestly ordination
- Ordained by: John S. Higgins
Episcopal consecration
- Consecrated by: Edmond L. Browning
Episcopal succession
Bishops consecrated by Arthur Benjamin Williams Jr. as principal consecrator
- Catherine Waynick: June 7, 1997
- Harry B. Bainbridge: 1998
- John Croneberger: November 21, 1998
- Wendell Gibbs: February 5, 2000
- Edward Stewart Little, II: 2000
- Robert R. Gepert: 2002
- Gayle Harris: 2003
- E. Ambrose Gumbs: 2005

Arthur Benjamin Williams Jr. (born 1935) is a retired bishop of the Episcopal Diocese of Ohio.

== See also ==
- List of Episcopal bishops of the United States
- Historical list of the Episcopal bishops of the United States
