= Charles D. Williams =

4th bishop of the Episcopal Diocese of Michigan

The Right Reverend Charles David Williams D.D., L.H.D., LL.D.
- Bishop of Michigan
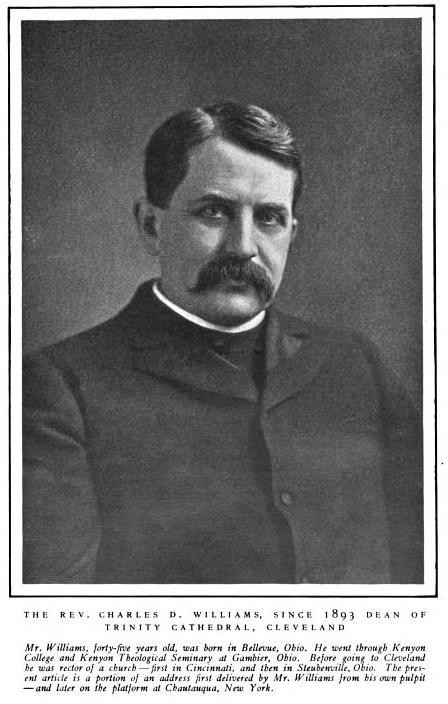
- Charles David Williams as Dean of Trinity Cathedral in Cleveland
- Church: Episcopal Church
- Diocese: Michigan
- Elected: November 16, 1905
- In office: 1906–1923
- Predecessor: Thomas Frederick Davies Sr.
- Successor: Herman Page

Orders
- Ordination: October 30, 1884 by Thomas Augustus Jaggar
- Consecration: February 7, 1906 by Daniel S. Tuttle

Personal details
- Born: July 30, 1860 Bellevue, Ohio, U.S.
- Died: February 14, 1923 (aged 62) Detroit, Michigan, U.S.
- Buried: Woodlawn Cemetery, Detroit
- Denomination: Anglican
- Parents: David Williams & Eliza Dickson
- Spouse: Lucy Victoria Benedict
- Education: Kenyon College and Bexley Hall

Charles David Williams (July 30, 1860 – February 14, 1923) was the fourth Bishop of Michigan in the Episcopal Church in the United States of America. He was an advocate of the "Social Gospel" views of Walter Rauschenbusch.

== Personal ==
Charles David Williams was born July 30, 1860, in Bellevue, Ohio. He was educated at Kenyon College and Bexley Hall where he was ordained an Episcopal deacon on June 17, 1883, and priest on October 30, 1884. He died February 14, 1923.

== Professional ==
Williams served as priest of Fernbank, Ohio, and Riverside, Ohio, from 1884 to 1889; as deacon at St. Paul's in Steubenville, Ohio, from 1889 to 1893; and as dean of Trinity Cathedral in Cleveland from 1893 to 1906. In 1906, he was consecrated as bishop of the Michigan Diocese of the Episcopal Church, where he remained until his death in 1923.

In his religious and social views, Williams was a liberal clergyman who advocated for the views of Walter Rauschenbush. Williams believed that the church should play an active role in resolving social problems. Although convinced that the church would always need to minister to individual philanthropic causes, he argued equally vigorously that the established denominations, in their teachings and advocacy of basic principles, should support reform of the economic and industrial system.

He was a member of the commission of church leaders that investigated the steel industry and was national president of the Church League for Industrial Democracy. After the January 1920 raids in Detroit, Williams was recruited as part of a citizens committee to help release the over 1000 men illegally arrested for peaceful assembly by the Justice Department run by General Palmer. This citizen's committee was led by Federick F. Ingram and the other members were S. S. Kresge, F. E. Brown, F. E. Steelwagen, and Fred M. Butzel. In 1921, he attended a seminar in England that studied the English labor movement in its relation with the church.

Episcopal Church (USA) titles
Preceded by Thomas Frederick Davies Sr.	4th Bishop of Michigan; 1906–1915	Succeeded by Herman Page
