= Episcopal Diocese of Western Michigan =

Diocese of the Episcopal Church in the United States

Coordinates: 43.5°N 85.5°W

Diocese of Western Michigan Diœcesis Michiganensis Occidentalis

Location
- Country: United States
- Territory: The Michigan counties of Allegan, Antrim, Barry, Benzie, Berrien, Branch, Calhoun, Cass, Charlevoix, Clare, Eaton, Emmet, Grand Traverse, Ionia, Isabella, Kalamazoo, Kalkaska, Kent, Lake, Leelanau, Manistee, Mason, Mecosta, Missaukee, Montcalm, Muskegon, Mewaygo, Oceana, Osceola, Ottawa, St. Joseph, Van Buren, and Wexford
- Ecclesiastical province: Province V
- Subdivisions: 3 regions
- Headquarters: Grand Rapids, MI

Statistics
- Congregations: 55 (2022)
- Members: 6,440 (2023)

Information
- Denomination: Episcopal Church
- Established: December 2, 1874
- Dissolved: June 28, 2024

Map
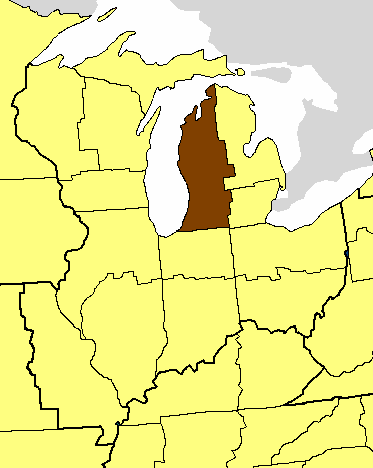
- Location of the Diocese of Western Michigan

Website
- www.edwm.org

The Episcopal Diocese of Western Michigan was an Episcopal diocese in the western half of the Lower Peninsula of Michigan. The diocese was founded in 1874, and was dissolved by merger in 2024.

The diocese was headquartered in Grand Rapids, Michigan and covered a 33-county area that stretched from the Straits of Mackinac southward to the Indiana border and from Lake Michigan to approximately the middle of the state. As of 2012 the website of the diocese described it as having 15,000 communicants organized in 58 communities of faith, of which 54 were parishes and 4 were seasonal chapels. It was organized into three regions, centered in Kalamazoo, Grand Rapids and Traverse City.

The Episcopal Diocese of Western Michigan had no cathedral in its final years. From 1969 to 2007, the bishop and the diocesan offices were located at the Cathedral Church of Christ the King, a prominent edifice near Interstate 94. However, this building was sold in 2007, and the congregation of the Parish Church of Christ the King moved to Texas Corners where it remained until January 2012, when the congregation disbanded.

At a Special Convention held on March 16, 2024, in Grand Blanc, there was an overwhelming vote in favor of joining the Episcopal Diocese of Eastern Michigan to establish the Episcopal Diocese of the Great Lakes. The juncture was approved on June 28, 2024 by the General Convention of the Episcopal Church.

The first bishop of the diocese was George D. Gillespie. Robert R. Gepert, was elected on October 19, 2001, and was consecrated as the 8th diocesan bishop on April 27, 2002. His episcopacy, which spanned 11 years, concluded with his retirement in 2013. Whayne M. Hougland, Jr., was elected as the 9th diocesan bishop in September 2013. Hougland was suspended in June 2019 after admitting to an extra-marital affair. Hougland resigned his position as bishop on July 1, 2021. The Rt. Rev. Skip Adams, a retired bishop of Central New York, served the Diocese in the capacity of assisting bishop on an interim basis. Bishop Prince Singh presided as Bishop of the Dioceses of Western and Eastern Michigan until accusations of domestic violence.

== Bishops ==
1. George D. Gillespie (1875-1909)
2. John N. McCormick (1909-1937)
3. Lewis Bliss Whittemore (1937-1953)
4. Dudley B. McNeil (1953-1959)
5. Charles E. Bennison Sr. (1960-1984)
6. Howard Meeks (1984-1988)
7. Edward L. Lee (1989-2002)
8. Robert R. Gepert (2002-2013)
9. Whayne M. Hougland, Jr. (2013-2021)
10. Prince G. Singh (2022-2023)
