= Thomas Frederick Davies Jr. =

Episcopal bishop

The Right Reverend Thomas Frederick Davies Jr. D.D.
- Bishop of Western Massachusetts
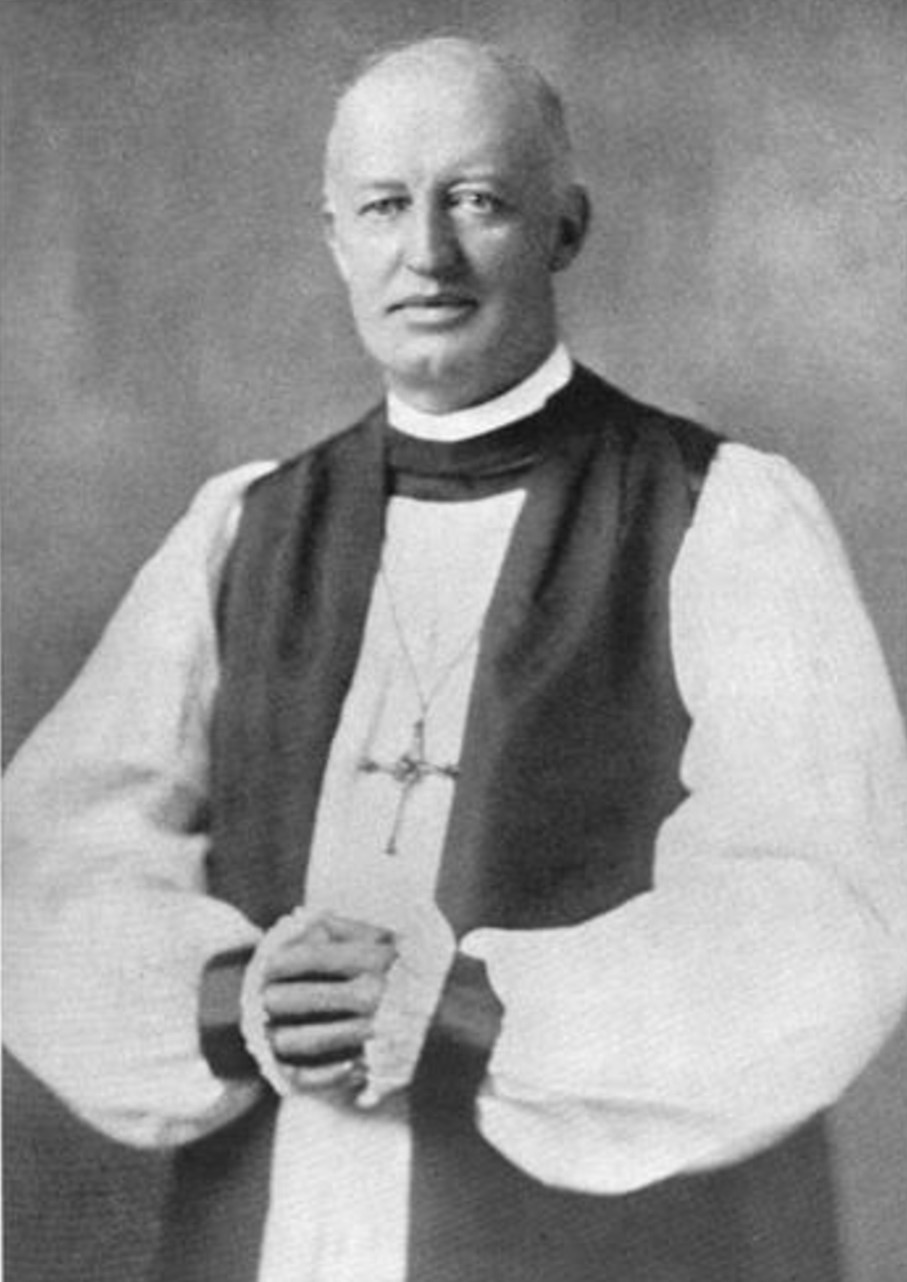
- Church: Episcopal Church
- Diocese: Western Massachusetts
- Elected: 1911
- In office: 1911–1936
- Predecessor: Alexander Hamilton Vinton
- Successor: William Appleton Lawrence

Orders
- Ordination: May 11, 1898 by Thomas Frederick Davies
- Consecration: October 18, 1911 by Daniel S. Tuttle

Personal details
- Born: July 20, 1872 Philadelphia, Pennsylvania, United States
- Died: August 25, 1936 (aged 64) Lenox, Massachusetts, United States
- Denomination: Anglican
- Parents: Thomas Frederick Davies & Mary Lang Hackstaff
- Spouse: Anna Morton Thayer (m. Feb. 24, 1930)

Thomas Frederick Davies Jr. (July 20, 1872 – August 25, 1936) was the second bishop of the Episcopal Diocese of Western Massachusetts from 1911 to 1936.

== Education ==
Davies was born on July 20, 1872, in Philadelphia, Pennsylvania, the son of Bishop Thomas Frederick Davies of Michigan and Mary Lang Hackstaff. He was educated in Phillips Exeter Academy in Exeter, New Hampshire, and at Yale University, from where he graduated with a B.A. in 1894. He earned his M.A. from Yale in 1907. In 1897 he graduated with a Bachelor of Divinity from General Theological Seminary. In 1911 he also earned his Doctor of Divinity from the same seminary and a year later another one from Amherst College.

== Ordination ==
On June 14, 1897, Davies was ordained deacon and priest on May 11, 1898. He served as assistant priest of the Church of the Incarnation in New York City, where he served until 1900 when he transferred to Norwich, Connecticut, to serve as rector of Christ Church. In 1903 he became rector of All Saints Church in Worcester, Massachusetts.

== Bishop ==
In 1911 Davies was elected and consecrated Bishop of Western Massachusetts. He established the cathedral of the diocese in Springfield, Massachusetts. He also served as president of the Episcopal Synod of the Province of New England between 1927 and 1932. Davies died in office on August 25, 1936, in Lenox, Massachusetts.
