= Gayle Harris =

American Episcopal bishop

The Right Reverend Gayle Harris
- Suffragan Bishop of Massachusetts
- Church: Episcopal Church
- Diocese: Massachusetts
- Elected: June 1, 2002
- In office: 2003–2022
- Predecessor: Barbara Harris

Orders
- Ordination: June 1982 by John Shelby Spong
- Consecration: January 18, 2003 by Arthur Benjamin Williams Jr.

Personal details
- Born: February 12, 1951 (age 75) Cleveland, Ohio, United States
- Denomination: Anglican

Gayle Elizabeth Harris (born February 12, 1951) was ordained as Bishop Suffragan of the Episcopal Diocese of Massachusetts in 2003, succeeding Barbara Harris (no relation). This was the first time in the Episcopal Church in the United States that a woman was succeeded as bishop by another woman.

== Early life and ministry ==
Harris was born on February 12, 1951, in Cleveland, Ohio. She studied at the Lewis & Clark College and then at the Church Divinity School of the Pacific, from where she earned a Master of Divinity. She was awarded an honorary Doctor of Divinity by the Church Divinity School of the Pacific in 2002, and an honorary Doctor of Humanity from the New England Law Boston.

Harris was ordained as a deacon in June 1981 and as a priest in February 1982. She served as assistant to Grace Church Van Vorst in Jersey City, New Jersey, and as diocesan Urban Resident at St. Philip's Church in Washington, D.C., from 1982 to 1984. In 1984, she became priest-in-charge of Holy Communion Church in Washington, D.C., and simultaneously as a member of the clergy at Washington National Cathedral. She left Washington for Rochester, New York, in 1992, to become the rector of St. Luke and St. Simon Cyrene's Church, where she remained until 2002.

She was elected Suffragan Bishop of Massachusetts on June 1, 2002, and was consecrated on January 18, 2003, at Trinity Church, Boston, by Bishop Arthur Benjamin Williams Jr. She chairs the House of Bishops Pastoral Development Committee and is the convenor of the Episcopal Bishops of African Descent.

In 2022, she retired as Bishop Suffragan of Massachusetts. In April 2023, she became the Assistant Bishop of the Diocese of Virginia.

== Accusations and apology ==
In 2018, Harris said that she personally saw Israeli security personnel arrest a 3-year-old on the Temple Mount for bouncing a ball that fell among worshipers at the Western Wall, and also saw Israeli soldiers respond to a comment by a 15-year-old boy by shooting him 10 times in the back. Harris was accused by the Simon Wiesenthal Center and other Jewish organizations of fabricating "defamatory and incendiary" stories of "Israeli heartlessness and criminality" in support of an Episcopal Church General Convention resolution condemning Israel. The Simon Wiesenthal Center said that her "anti-Israel rhetoric borders on a 'blood libel'" Several weeks later, Harris apologized, stating that "I now acknowledge that I reported stories which I had heard and unintentionally framed them as though I had personally witnessed the alleged events." She added, "I did not take the opportunity to verify these stories...I was ill-advised to repeat the stories without verification, and I apologize for doing so."

== See also ==
- List of Episcopal bishops of the United States
- Historical list of the Episcopal bishops of the United States
