= Sibley House (Detroit) =

Historic house in Michigan, United States

- U.S. National Register of Historic Places
- Michigan State Historic Site
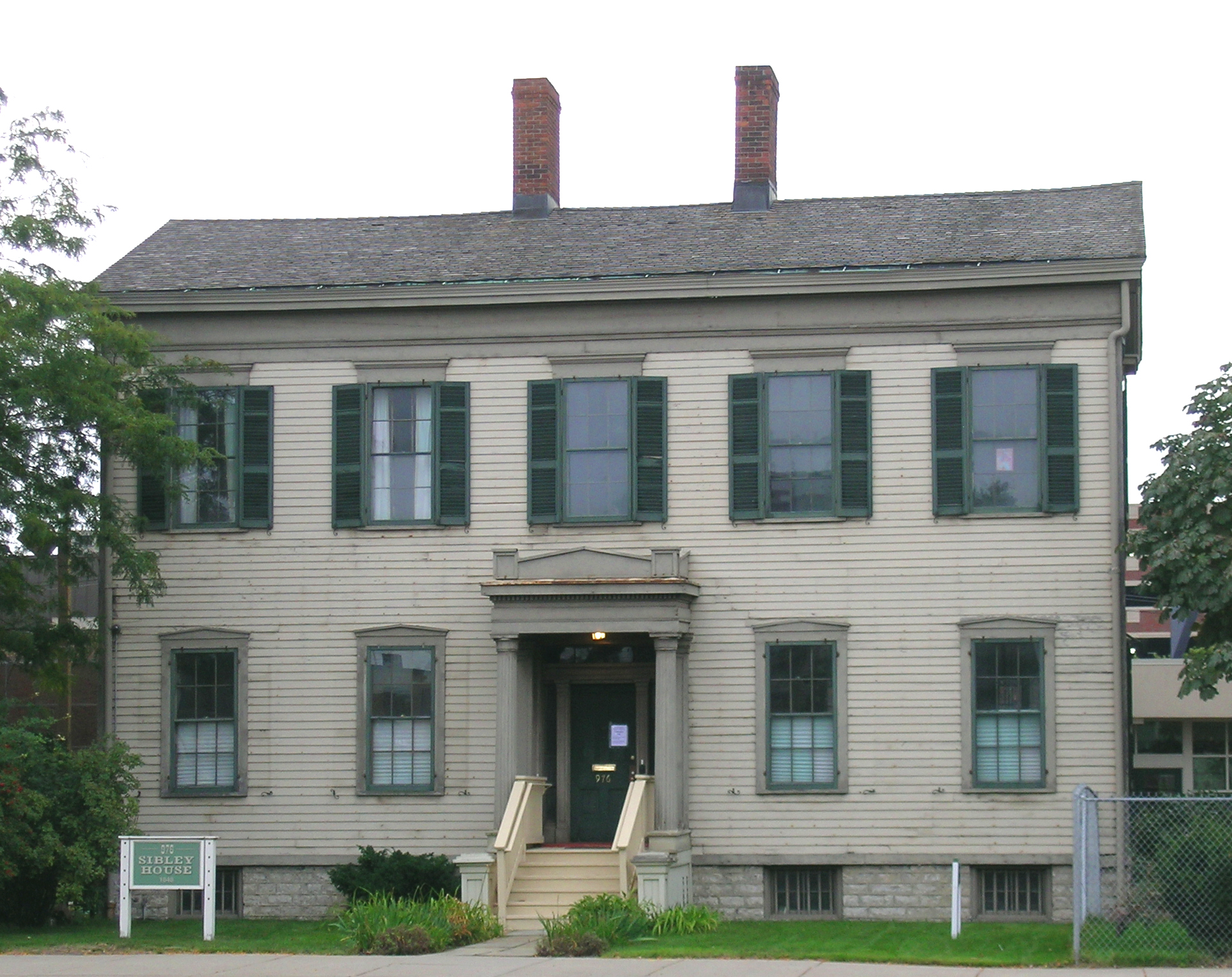
- Interactive map
- Location: 976 East Jefferson Avenue; Detroit, Michigan
- Coordinates: 42.332806°N 83.034793°W
- Built: 1848
- NRHP reference No.: 71000432

Significant dates
- Added to NRHP: April 16, 1971
- Designated MSHS: February 19, 1958

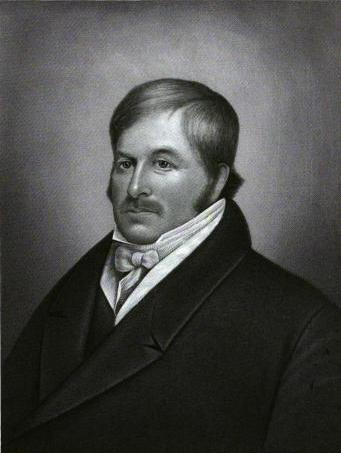
Solomon Sibley

The Sibley House is a private residence located at 976 East Jefferson Avenue in Detroit, Michigan. It currently is used as the offices of Christ Church Detroit. The house was designated a Michigan State Historic Site in 1958 and listed on the National Register of Historic Places in 1971.

== History ==
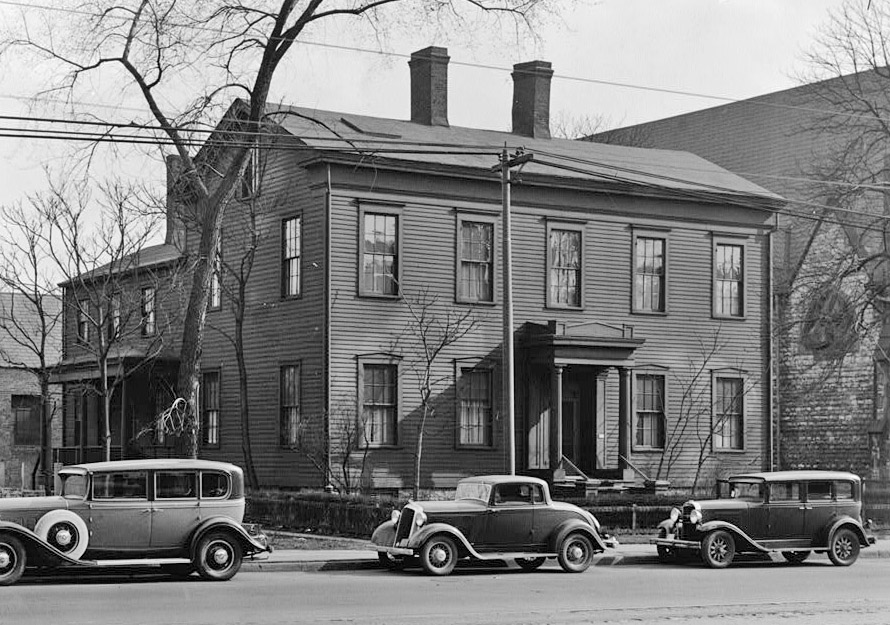
Sibley House in 1934

Solomon Sibley moved to Detroit in the late 1790s; he was one of the first lawyers to live in what was then a small village. He served in a number of political positions while living in Detroit. In 1799, he began service in the territorial legislature; in 1806 he became mayor of Detroit; from 1815 to 1824 he was US District Attorney for Michigan. Sibley served as Michigan's representative in Congress from 1820 to 1823, and from 1824 to 1827, he served on the territorial Supreme Court.

Sibley died in 1846. Shortly thereafter, his widow, Sarah Sproat Sibley, built this home for herself and their two daughters.

== Description ==
The Sibley house is a clapboard, side-gabled Greek Revival-style home. The symmetrical front façade faces Jefferson Avenue, and is divided into five-bays separated by trabeated windows. A central, columned portico entrance fronts the building.

== Later use ==
The home was occupied by descendants of Solomon Sibley from its construction until 1925, when it was sold to the next-door church Christ Church Detroit. Christ Church used the home for a variety of purposes until 1946, when it became the parish rectory. Currently, it serves as office space for Christ Church.
