= H. Coleman McGehee Jr. =

American lawyer and religious leader (1923–2013)

The Right Reverend Harry Coleman McGehee Jr. D.D., J.D.
- Bishop of Michigan
- Church: Episcopal Church
- Diocese: Michigan
- Elected: May 1971
- In office: 1973–1990
- Predecessor: Richard S. M. Emrich
- Successor: R. Stewart Wood
- Previous post: Coadjutor Bishop of Michigan (1971–1973)

Orders
- Ordination: June 22, 1958 by Frederick D. Goodwin
- Consecration: October 10, 1971 by John E. Hines

Personal details
- Born: July 7, 1923 Richmond, Virginia, United States
- Died: March 14, 2013 (aged 89) Pontiac, Michigan, United States
- Denomination: Anglican
- Spouse: June Chrystine Stewart
- Children: 5
- Education: Virginia Tech (BS); T. C. Williams School of Law (LLB); Virginia Theological Seminary

Harry Coleman McGehee Jr. (July 7, 1923 – March 14, 2013) was a bishop in the Episcopal Church in the United States of America. He served the Diocese of Michigan as bishop coadjutor from 1971 to 1973 and as diocesan bishop from 1973 to 1990. McGehee also served as assistant attorney general of the Commonwealth of Virginia.

== Early life and ministry ==
Harry Coleman McGehee Jr. was born in Richmond, Virginia in 1923 to Annie Lee (née Cheatwood) and Harry C. McGehee. He attended Thomas Jefferson High School. He served during World War II as a 2nd lieutenant in the U.S. Army Corps of Engineers. After completing his military service, he graduated from Virginia Tech in 1947 with a Bachelor of Science in engineering. He then earned a Bachelor of Laws at the T. C. Williams School of Law (University of Richmond) in 1949.

McGehee joined the staff of the Attorney General of Virginia in 1949. He served as aide to assistant attorney general C. Champion Bowles. In December 1951, he was assistant attorney general of Virginia. McGehee later entered the Protestant Episcopal Theological Seminary of Virginia, graduating in 1957.

He was ordained deacon on June 7, 1957, and priest on June 22, 1958, both by Bishop Frederick D. Goodwin of Virginia. Prior to coming to Michigan, he was rector of Immanuel-on-the-Hill Episcopal Church in Alexandria, Virginia, from 1960 to 1971, where he was the pastor to President Gerald R. Ford and Betty Ford. McGehee was elected bishop in May 1971, beginning his service in October of that year. Then 48, he succeeded the Richard S. M. Emrich, who had led the Michigan diocese since 1948.

In 1988, he approached the National Convention of the Episcopal Church in Detroit with a plan for an economic justice ministry. With their help, the Bishop H. Coleman McGehee Economic Justice Fund was established in 1988, and transitioned into the Opportunity Resource Fund in 2010.

== Community activism ==
McGehee was known as a civil rights and peace advocate and activist within Michigan. He specifically developed a reputation for supporting women's rights, LGBT equality, and union labor. He offered a liturgy for peace on multiple Good Fridays at the gates of Williams International in Walled Lake, Michigan where missiles were then being made. His support of women serving as clergy culminated in 1977 when he ordained Meredith Hunt, the first woman to become a priest in the Diocese of Michigan. He also welcomed gay and lesbian members into the church and ordained some gay and lesbian people.

McGehee founded the Michigan Coalition for Human Rights in December 1980 with Thomas Gumbleton, Catholic former auxiliary bishop in Detroit, and rabbi Richard Hertz.

== Retirement and late career ==
McGehee retired on January 1, 1990, with a special election held in May 1988 to elect his successor. While a woman was a finalist for the position, which would have resulted in the first woman to become an Episcopalian bishop, ultimately the election was won by R. Stewart Wood Jr., rector of St. John's Episcopal Church in Memphis, Tennessee.

Five years into retirement, he supported the locked-out Detroit Free Press and Detroit News employees in 1995. At the age of 72, he stood with them on the picket line, spoke for them and also went to jail with them.

McGehee continued to engage on LGBT issues by serving as chair of the Triangle Foundation (later Equality Michigan) Board of Advisors - the long-serving chair in the organization's history. He was also in attendance for the consecration of Gene Robinson, the first openly gay person to become a bishop within the Episcopal Church. Later, he participated with Robinson in the 2004 "People Who Care About People with AIDS" event at St. John's Episcopal Church in Royal Oak, Michigan.

== Personal life ==
McGehee married June Chrystine Stewart. They had five children, Lesley, Cary, Alexander, C. Harry, and Donald.

McGehee stopped functioning publicly after the onset of dementia several years prior to his death. McGehee died on the night of March 14, 2013, after a protracted illness at St. Joseph Mercy Hospital in Pontiac, Michigan. His daughter, Cary, was reading spiritual imperatives to him at the time of his death. He was cremated.

== See also ==
- List of bishops of the Episcopal Church in the United States of America

Episcopal Church (USA) titles
Preceded by Richard S. M. Emrich	Bishop of Michigan; May 1971 – 1988	Succeeded by R. Stewart Wood
