= Thomas Frederick Davies (father) =

Episcopalian Bishop of Michigan

The Right Reverend Thomas Frederick Davies Sr. D.D., LL.D.
- Bishop of Michigan
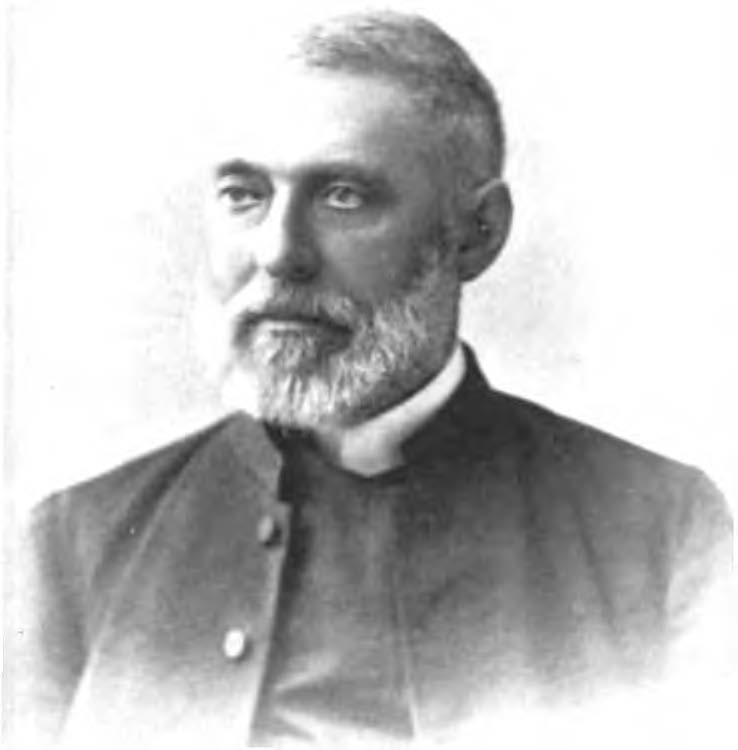
- Church: Episcopal Church
- Diocese: Michigan
- Elected: 1889
- In office: 1889–1905
- Predecessor: Samuel Smith Harris
- Successor: Charles D. Williams

Orders
- Ordination: May 27, 1857 by John Williams
- Consecration: October 18, 1889 by John Williams

Personal details
- Born: August 31, 1831 Fairfield, Connecticut, U.S.
- Died: November 9, 1905 (aged 74) Detroit, Michigan, U.S.
- Buried: Elmwood Cemetery, Detroit
- Denomination: Anglican
- Parents: Thomas Frederick Davies & Julia Sanford
- Spouse: Mary L. Hackstaff (m. 1862)
- Children: Anna Hackstaff, Marion Sanford, Thomas Frederick Davies Jr.
- Education: Hopkins Grammar School, Yale University, Berkeley Divinity School, University of Pennsylvania, Hobart College

Thomas Frederick Davies Sr. (August 31, 1831 – November 9, 1905) was the third Bishop of Michigan in the Episcopal Church in the United States.

== Personal ==
Davies was born in Fairfield, Connecticut, on August 31, 1831, to Thomas Frederick and Julia Sanford Davies. He was of Welsh descent and raised in Fairfield. Davies prepared for college at Hopkins Grammar School in New Haven, Connecticut. He entered Yale University in 1849, where he was close friends with George Shiras Jr. and Andrew Dickson White, and graduated in 1853. He studied at Berkeley Divinity School under Bishop John Williams. Davies lived with Bishop Williams for six years, became his secretary, and remained close friends until the death of Bishop Williams. In 1871, he received a Doctor of Divinity from the University of Pennsylvania; a Legum Doctor from Hobart College in 1889; and a Legum Doctor from Yale University in 1893. Davies married Mary L. Hackstaff on April 29, 1862.

He died of pneumonia at his home in Detroit on November 9, 1905, and was buried at Elmwood Cemetery on November 13. He was survived by his wife and his children, Anna Hackstaff, Marion Sanford, and Thomas Frederick Davies Jr. - who was serving as rector of All Saints' Episcopal Church in Worcester, Massachusetts, and would go on to become the second bishop of the Episcopal Diocese of Western Massachusetts.

== Professional ==
Davies was ordained a deacon on May 18, 1856, by Bishop Williams at the Christ Church in Middletown, Connecticut, and priest on May 27, 1857. He was professor in Hebrew at the Berkeley Divinity School from 1857 to 1863.

He served as rector at St. John's Episcopal Church in Portsmouth, New Hampshire, from 1863 to 1868, before becoming rector of St. Peter's Episcopal Church in Philadelphia, Pennsylvania, until 1889. During his tenure at St. Peter's, 3,000 people were baptized, 1,000 people were confirmed, the church's endowment fund was created, the St. Peter's House was established, two churches were built, and US$700,000 (equivalent to $25,083,333 in 2025) were contributed for church purposes.

He was consecrated at St. Peter's as bishop of the Episcopal Diocese of Michigan on St. Luke's Day, October 18, 1889, and served in that position until his death. During his tenure, the value of the Diocese's property increased from US$1,411,705 (equivalent to $50,586,096 in 2025) to US$1,908,369 (equivalent to $68,383,222 in 2025); disbursements increased from US$204,603 (equivalent to $7,331,607 in 2025) to US$240,803 (equivalent to $8,628,774 in 2025); communicants increased from 12,214 to 17,716; and confirmations increased from 1,112 in 1888 to 1,198 in 1905.

Episcopal Church (USA) titles
Preceded by Samuel Smith Harris	Bishop of Michigan; 1889–1905	Succeeded by Charles D. Williams
