= Edward Lewis Lee Jr. =

American prelate of the Episcopal Church (born 1934)

The Right Reverend Edward Lewis Lee
- Bishop of Western Michigan
- Church: Episcopal Church
- Diocese: Western Michigan
- Elected: June 3, 1989
- In office: 1989–2002
- Predecessor: Howard Meeks
- Successor: Robert R. Gepert

Orders
- Ordination: November 14, 1959 by J. Gillespie Armstrong
- Consecration: October 7, 1989 by Edward W. Jones

Personal details
- Born: 1934 (age 91–92) Fort Washington, Pennsylvania, United States
- Denomination: Anglican
- Spouse: Kathryn Fligg (m. 1961)
- Children: 1
- Education: Brown University

Edward Lewis Lee Jr. (born 1934) is an American prelate of the Episcopal Church who served as the seventh Bishop of Western Michigan between 1989 and 2002.

== Early life ==
Lee was born in 1934 in Fort Washington, Pennsylvania. He graduated from Brown University with a Bachelor of Arts in 1956. He then studied at the General Theological Seminary, graduating in 1959 with a Master of Divinity. He was ordained deacon on May 9, 1959 by Bishop Oliver J. Hart of Pennsylvania, and priest on November 14, 1959 by Bishop J. Gillespie Armstrong Suffragan of Pennsylvania.

== Career ==
Between 1959 and 1964, he served as curate at the Church of the Holy Trinity in Philadelphia. In 1964 he became the Episcopal Advisor of the University Christian Movement of Temple University, retaining the post till 1973. He also served as Sunday and pastoral assistant at the Church of the Annunciation in Philadelphia, parish consultant at St. Peter's Episcopal Church of Germantown, and lecturer in homiletics at the Philadelphia Divinity School. Between 1970 and 1973, he also served as the national chairperson of the Episcopal Peace Fellowship and between 1973 and 1982, Lee was rector of St James' Church in Florence, Italy. He also served as a deputy to General Convention representing the Convocation of Episcopal Churches in Europe, in 1976 and 1979. In 1982, he became rector of St John's Church, in Washington, D.C., where he served until 1989.

== Bishop ==
Lee was elected Bishop of Western Michigan on June 3, 1989 in the Cathedral Church of Christ the King, and consecrated on October 7, 1989. He retired on July 1, 2002, and later served as Assisting Bishop in the Diocese of Pennsylvania until 2017.
