= Edwin M. Leidel Jr. =

American Episcopal prelate (1938–2022)

The Right Reverend Edwin Max Leidel D.Min., D.D.
- Bishop of Eastern Michigan
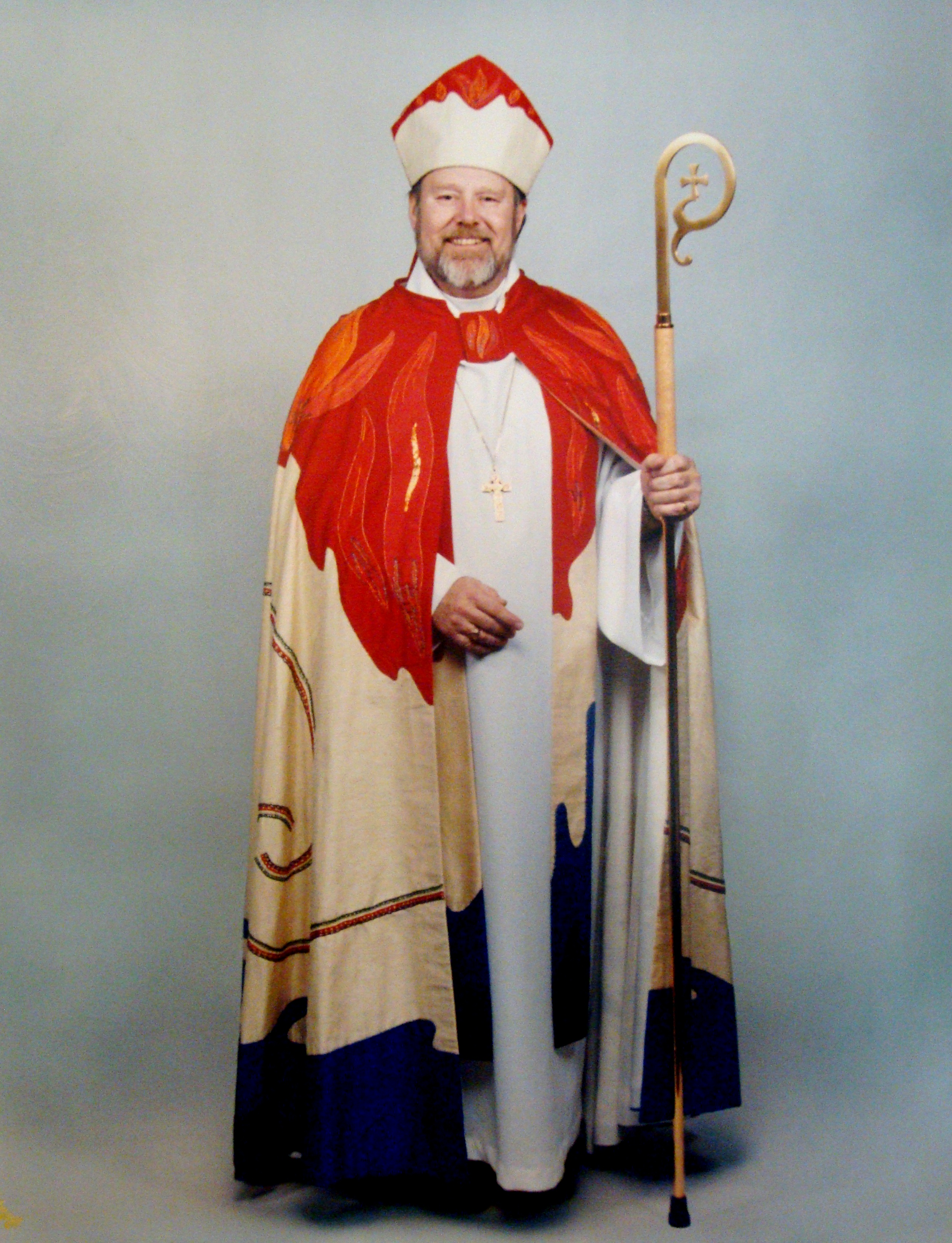
- Church: Episcopal Church
- Diocese: Eastern Michigan
- Elected: March 16, 1996
- In office: 1996–2006
- Successor: Todd Ousley
- Other post: Provisional Bishop of Eau Claire (2010-2013)

Orders
- Ordination: 1964 by Donald H. V. Hallock
- Consecration: September 7, 1996 by Edmond L. Browning

Personal details
- Born: October 13, 1938 Baltimore, Maryland, U.S.
- Died: June 5, 2022 (aged 83)
- Denomination: Anglican
- Parents: Edwin Max Leidel & Gertrude Stablefeldt
- Spouse: Ira Pauline Voigt (m. June 20, 1964)
- Children: 2
- Education: Nashotah House
- Alma mater: University of Wisconsin

Edwin Max "Ed" Leidel Jr. OJN (October 13, 1938 – June 5, 2022) was a bishop of the Episcopal Church who served as Bishop of Eastern Michigan from 1996 to 2006 and as the Provisional Bishop of Eau Claire from 2010 to 2013.

== Biography ==
A native of Baltimore, Maryland, Leidel became an ordained deacon at Christ Episcopal Church in Whitefish Bay, Wisconsin in 1963. The following year, Leidel became an ordained priest at St. Luke's Episcopal Church, Chapel, Guildhall, and Rectory in Racine, Wisconsin and was commissioned an officer and military chaplain in the United States Navy Reserve. From 1967 to 1970, he served as a rector at St. Stephen's Episcopal Church in Racine. In 1970, he returned to Christ Episcopal Church in Whitefish Bay.

From 1975 to 1986, Leidel was a rector at St. Timothy's Episcopal Church in Indianapolis, Indiana. However, he spent a year of that time in Darwin, Northern Territory, in Australia as Acting Dean of the Anglican cathedral there. In 1986, Leidel became a rector at St. Christopher's Episcopal Church in Roseville, Minnesota. In 1990, Leidel completed his Doctor of Ministry Degree at the School of Theology of the University of the South.

From 1996 to 2006, Leidel served as the first bishop of the newly created Episcopal Diocese of Eastern Michigan. In 2007, he was named Congregation Coach of the Anglican Diocese of Huron. He was elected to his final position in 2010.

Leidel and his wife, Ira Leidel, resided in Glendale, Wisconsin. He was a published author of two books.

== Education ==
- University of Wisconsin–Madison
- Nashotah House
- University of Wisconsin–Milwaukee
- Sewanee: The University of the South
- Leidel also holds honorary degrees from Nashotah House and Huron University College.
