= Dudley B. McNeil =

The Right Reverend Dudley Barr McNeil D.D.
- Bishop of Western Michigan
- Church: Episcopal Church
- Diocese: Western Michigan
- Elected: March 19, 1953
- In office: 1953–1959
- Predecessor: Lewis Bliss Whittemore
- Successor: Charles E. Bennison Sr.

Orders
- Ordination: May 1936 by George Craig Stewart
- Consecration: July 25, 1953 by Henry Knox Sherrill

Personal details
- Born: May 29, 1908 Evanston, Illinois, United States
- Died: August 11, 1977 (aged 69)
- Denomination: Anglican
- Parents: Walter William McNeil & Emily Barr
- Spouse: Charlotte L. Miller (m. 1934)
- Children: 2

Dudley Barr McNeil (May 29, 1908 - August 11, 1977) was an American prelate of the Episcopal Church who served as Bishop of Western Michigan between 1953 and 1959.

== Biography ==
McNeil was born on May 29, 1908, in Evanston, Illinois, the son of Walter William McNeil and Emily Barr. He was educated at the Elgin Academy. He also graduated from the Seabury-Western Theological Seminary in 1936. He married Charlotte L. Miller on June 12, 1934, and together had two children.

McNeil was ordained deacon in November 1935 and priest in May 1936 by Bishop George Craig Stewart of Chicago. He initially served as deacon-in-charge of St Lawrence's Church in Libertyville, Illinois, before becoming rector of St Paul's Church in Evanston, Wyoming, and simultaneously priest-in-charge of the churches in Cokeville, Wyoming, and Big Piney, Wyoming, between 1937 and 1945. Between 1938 and 1945, he also served as priest-in-charge of the missions in Pinedale, Wyoming, and La Barge, Wyoming. Between 1939 and 1945, he also served as priest-in-charge of the missions in Bondurant, Wyoming. In 1945, he was appointed Dean of St Matthew's Cathedral in Laramie, Wyoming, where he served till 1949, after which he became rector of St James' Church in Sault Ste. Marie, Michigan, and Dean of the eastern part of the Diocese of Northern Michigan.

On March 19, 1953, McNeil was elected Bishop of Western Michigan on the second ballot, and was consecrated on July 25, 1953, by Presiding Bishop Henry Knox Sherrill. During the luncheon that followed his consecration, McNeil collapsed and was taken in hospital. He served as bishop till his resignation in on September 1, 1959, due to ill health. He then served as vicar of Holy Communion Church in Lake View, New York. Between 1975 and 1977, he also served as Assistant Bishop in the Diocese of Western New York. He died in August 1977.
