= Barbara Harris (bishop) =

American bishop (1930–2020)

The Right Reverend Barbara Harris
- Suffragan Bishop of Massachusetts
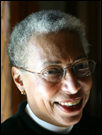
- Church: Episcopal Church
- Diocese: Diocese of Massachusetts
- Elected: September 24, 1988
- In office: 1989–2003
- Successor: Gayle Elizabeth Harris
- Other post: Assisting Bishop of Washington (2003–2007)

Orders
- Ordination: September 29, 1979 (deacon); October 18, 1980 (priest) by Lyman Ogilby
- Consecration: February 11, 1989 by Edmond L. Browning

Personal details
- Born: June 12, 1930 Philadelphia, Pennsylvania, U.S.
- Died: March 13, 2020 (aged 89) Lincoln, Massachusetts, U.S.
- Denomination: Anglican
- Parents: Walter Harris, Beatrice Waneidah Price
- Spouse: Raymond Rollins (m. 1960; div. 1963)
- Education: Philadelphia High School for Girls; Villanova University

Barbara Clementine Harris (June 12, 1930 – March 13, 2020) was an American bishop of the Episcopal Church in the United States. She was the first woman consecrated a bishop in the Anglican Communion. She was elected suffragan bishop of the Episcopal Diocese of Massachusetts, on September 24, 1988, and was consecrated on February 11, 1989. Eight thousand people attended the service, which was held at the Hynes Convention Center in Boston, Massachusetts. She served in the role of suffragan bishop for 13 years, retiring in 2003.

== Personal life and education ==
Barbara Clementine Harris was born in Philadelphia, Pennsylvania, on June 12, 1930. She was the daughter of Walter Harris and Beatrice Waneidah Price. Harris attended the Philadelphia High School for Girls (class of 1948). There, she excelled in music and wrote a weekly column for the Philadelphia version of the Pittsburgh Courier called "High School Notes by Bobbi". The alumnae association of the school recognized her as an outstanding alumna for her professional work and she was installed in its court of honor.

After graduation from high school, Harris attended the Charles Morris Price School of Advertising and Journalism in Philadelphia, where she earned a certificate in 1950. She later attended Villanova University, the Urban Theology Unit in Sheffield, England, and also graduated from the Pennsylvania Foundation for Pastoral Counseling.

== Career ==
Prior to her ordination to the priesthood, Harris served as head of public relations for the Sun Oil Company.

Harris was long active in civil rights issues, participating in Freedom Rides and marches in the 1960s, including the Selma to Montgomery marches led by Martin Luther King Jr. She spent summer vacations registering black voters in Greenville, Mississippi. She dismissed the risks she took, saying only, "Everyone was in danger."

Throughout her various careers, Harris was noted for her liberal views and her outspokenness. As early as 1989 she was reported as arguing for gay rights and lambasting the Episcopal Church for racism and sexism.

=== Ordination and ministry ===
Harris attended the Church of the Advocate on the north side of Philadelphia, for many years. She served as an acolyte in the historic service, held at the Church of the Advocate, in which the first eleven women, now known as the Philadelphia Eleven, were ordained priests in the Episcopal Church on July 29, 1974. The ordinations were controversial, as women's ordination was still being debated in the Episcopal Church, but they were later officially recognized.

When Harris felt called to the ministry. the rector at Church of the Advocate, Paul Washington, recommended her to Bishop Lyman C. Ogilby of Pennsylvania, as a candidate for ordination. Ogilby ordained her as a deacon in 1979 and then as a priest in 1980. She studied in the Diocese of Pennsylvania's Alternative Program for Theological Education and Training.

Harris was the priest-in-charge of St. Augustine of Hippo Church in Norristown, Pennsylvania, from 1980 to 1984. She also served as chaplain to the Philadelphia County prisons, and as counsel to industrial corporations for public policy issues and social concerns. She was named executive director of the Episcopal Church Publishing Company in 1984, and publisher of The Witness magazine. In 1988 she served as interim rector of the Church of the Advocate.

=== Election as bishop ===
Harris was elected bishop suffragan of the Episcopal Diocese of Massachusetts, on September 24, 1988, at a special convention of diocesan delegates. Her election was controversial, in part because she was divorced and had not attended seminary. She was also the first woman to be elected to the position of bishop not only in the Episcopal Church, but in all of the Anglican Communion. Some members of the church felt it was inappropriate to elevate a woman to the position of bishop, and others were concerned that her election would strain relations with the wider Anglican Communion. Nevertheless, Harris had many supporters and her election was successful.

Harris was consecrated on February 11, 1989. Eight thousand people attended the service, which was held at the Hynes Convention Center in Boston, Massachusetts. Sixty bishops participated in the laying on of hands. There were 1,200 dignitaries and clergy in the opening procession, and four choirs participating in the service. The service was televised live and lasted three hours.

As the first woman ordained as a bishop, and as an African American, she received death threats and obscene messages. Though urged to wear a bulletproof vest to her ordination, she refused. A contingent of the Boston police were assigned to her consecration. Her comment was merely, "I don't take this in a personal way."

Speaking of her work as bishop, Harris said, "I certainly don't want to be one of the boys. I want to offer my peculiar gifts as a black woman ... a sensitivity and an awareness that comes out of more than a passing acquaintance with oppression."

Harris served for 13 years as bishop in the Episcopal Diocese of Massachusetts, a large diocese with 98,000 members. She retired in 2003 and was succeeded by another African-American woman, Gayle Elizabeth Harris (no relation). She then served as assisting bishop in the Episcopal Diocese of Washington until 2007. She was also the president of the Episcopal Church Publishing Company, publishers of The Witness magazine.

=== Reaction to consecration as bishop ===
Conservative Episcopalians who were opposed to women's ordination established an independent denomination, the Episcopal Synod of America, in reaction to Harris' election as bishop suffragan.

== Death and legacy ==
In 2010, Harris suffered a stroke at her home in Massachusetts. She appeared to have made a full recovery and preached at an ecumenical worship service in the historic Tabernacle in Oak Bluffs, Massachusetts, on September 5, 2010. Her sermon was entitled "It Isn't Easy Being Green". Harris died at a hospice in Lincoln, Massachusetts, on March 13, 2020, at age 89.

The Barbara C. Harris Camp & Conference Center is a ministry of the Episcopal Diocese of Massachusetts located in Greenfield, New Hampshire. The center is named in honor of Harris. A task force was convened in 1997 to explore the potential of the center and their recommendation to proceed with the development of the center was approved by the diocesan council in 1998. From 1999 to 2002, the development of the center was under the direction of diocesan staff. In addition, over 200 lay and clergy volunteers lent their time, energy, and expertise to the project, working in a variety of roles. An extensive fund-raising campaign took place in order to finance the construction and to fund a scholarship endowment and an operating endowment. The center welcomed its first summer campers in July 2003.

Three months after her death, Harris was commemorated at the consecration and installation of Deon Kevin Johnson, eleventh bishop of the Episcopal Diocese of Missouri on June 13, 2020. The collect and readings for her commemoration were written and selected by Johnson and the Rev. Canon Sandye Wilson.

The Episcopal Church added, on a trial basis, the observance of the consecration of Bishop Barbara Clementine Harris to the church liturgical calendar on 11 February for 2023-2024.

The celebration of Bishop Harris' Consecration was made permanent by the 81st Convention of the Episcopal Church on June 28, 2024.
