= George D. Gillespie =

American bishop (1819–1909)

The Right Reverend George De Normandie Gillespie S.T.D.
- Bishop of Western Michigan
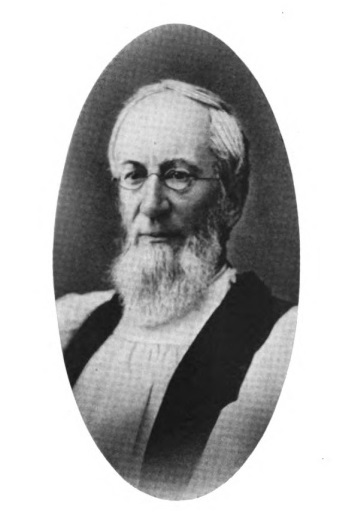
- Gillespie in 1904
- Church: Episcopal Church
- Diocese: Western Michigan
- Elected: December 2, 1874
- In office: 1875–1909
- Successor: John N. McCormick

Orders
- Ordination: June 30, 1843 by William H. DeLancey
- Consecration: February 24, 1875 by Samuel A. McCoskry

Personal details
- Born: June 14, 1819 Goshen, New York, United States
- Died: March 19, 1909 (aged 89) Grand Rapids, Michigan, United States
- Buried: Ann Arbor, Michigan
- Denomination: Anglican
- Parents: John De Normandie Gillespie & Susan Bedford
- Spouse: Rebecca Parrett (m. 1846)
- Education: General Theological Seminary

George De Normandie Gillespie (June 14, 1819 – March 19, 1909) was the first bishop of Western Michigan in The Episcopal Church.

== Early life and education ==
Gillespie was born on June 14, 1819, in Goshen, New York, to John De Normandie Gillespie and Susan Bedford. He studied at the General Theological Seminary, graduating in theology in 1840. He was awarded a Doctor of Sacred Theology in 1875 from Hobart College.

== Career ==
Gillespie was ordained deacon on June 28, 1840, in St Peter's Church, by Bishop Benjamin T. Onderdonk of New York, and priest in St Mark's Church, Le Roy, New York, on June 30, 1843, by Bishop William H. DeLancey of Western New York. He then served as rector of St Mark's Church in Le Roy, New York, between 1840 and 1844, and then rector of St Paul's Church in Cincinnati between 1844 and 1851. In 1851, he became rector of Zion Church in Palmyra, New York, while in 1861, he transferred to Ann Arbor, Michigan, to serve as rector of St Andrew's Church.

== Bishop ==
In 1874, Gillespie was elected as the first bishop of Western Michigan and was consecrated on February 24, 1875, by Bishop Samuel A. McCoskry of Michigan. He died in office on March 19, 1909, aged 89, after a long illness.
