= Former Cathedral Church of Christ the King =

Coordinates: 42°14′24.0″N 85°37′14.2″W

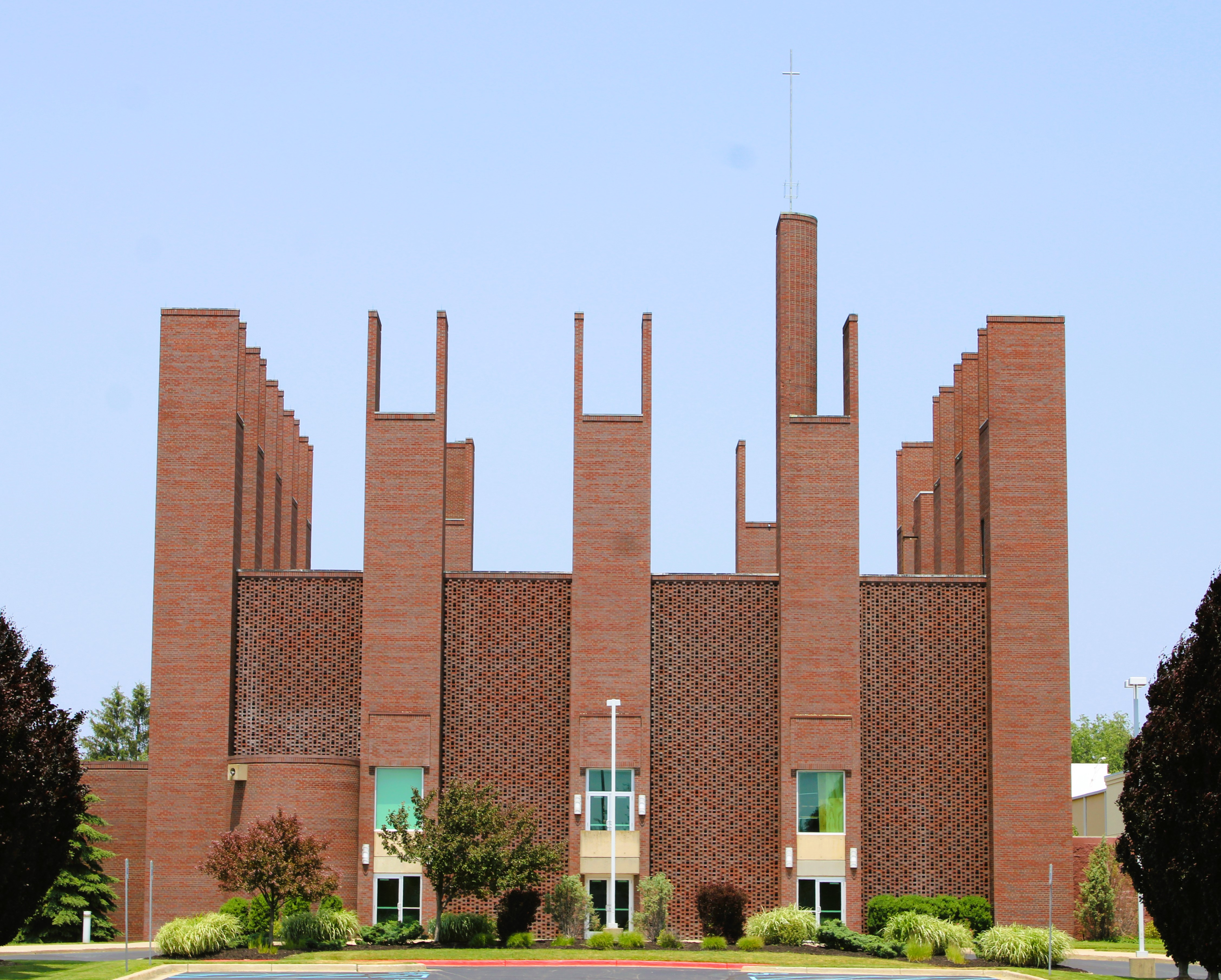
- The former cathedral in 2023
- Former Cathedral Church of Christ the King
- Location: Portage, Michigan
- Address: 2500 Vincent Ave
- Country: United States
- Previous denomination: Episcopal Church (1969-2007)

Cathedral Church of Christ the King was formerly the mother church of the Episcopal Diocese of Western Michigan in Portage, Michigan.

== History ==
In 1965, at the urging of Bishop Charles E. Bennison Sr., a Diocesan Convention approved building the new Cathedral, and the next year Chicago-based architect Irving W. Colburn was hired. In 1967 a congregation was organized and ground broken for the Cathedral of Christ the King. The Cathedral was completed in two years, at a cost of $1,653,729.81 (equivalent to $10.8 million in 2024), though the building was not consecrated as a cathedral until 1977.

The cathedral organ was a 49-rank Aeolian/Skinner, the second to last organ built by the Skinner Company. At the entrance, the cathedral featured bas-reliefs executed by Leo Lentelli in 1922 for the facade of the Straus Building at the corner of Michigan Avenue and Jackson Boulevard in the City of Chicago from 1922 to 1952. Mown into the field at the northwest and southwest corner of the Cathedral grounds were two labyrinths.

The last dean of the cathedral was the very Reverend Cynthia L. Black, who also served as president of the Episcopal Women's Caucus from 1995–2000.

== Sale of the Cathedral ==
The Cathedral included office space that was rented by the Diocese of Western Michigan until 2006 when the offices moved to their present quarters in a Kalamazoo office building. Without the rental income from the diocese, the cathedral became unsustainable and was sold in 2007 to the non-denominational Valley Family Church. The organ was sold to St. Andrew's Lutheran Church in Franklin, Tennessee. The carillon was eventually bought by the Gordon Stuart Peek Foundation and donated to the University of Washington, where it sits on top of a ventilation shaft on Kane Hall as of 2020.

== Legacy ==
The Cathedral has the distinction of appearing twice on Nicholas Hahn's list of “Ugliest Churches in the World,” both in its first incarnation and in its renovation as a mega-church. Hahn is a conservative activist who wrote for realclearreligion.org at the time.
