= Charles E. Bennison Sr. =

American Episcopal priest

The Right Reverend Charles E. Bennison D.D.
- Bishop of Western Michigan
- Church: Episcopal Church
- See: Western Michigan
- Elected: November 1959
- In office: 1960–1984
- Predecessor: Dudley B. McNeil
- Successor: Howard Meeks
- Previous posts: Rector, Christ Church, Joliet, Illinois

Orders
- Ordination: October 5, 1942 by Stephen Keeler
- Consecration: February 24, 1960 by Arthur C. Lichtenberger

Personal details
- Born: July 23, 1917 Janesville, Wisconsin, United States
- Died: January 5, 2004 (aged 86) Menlo Park, California, United States
- Buried: Former Cathedral Church of Christ the King
- Denomination: Anglican
- Parents: Floyd William Bennison & Cleo Leona Wilson
- Spouse: Marjorie Elizabeth Haglun (m. 1942)
- Children: 3

Charles Ellsworth Bennison Sr. (July 23, 1917 – January 5, 2004) was the fifth bishop of the Episcopal Diocese of Western Michigan. He was the father of Charles E. Bennison Jr., former bishop of the Episcopal Diocese of Pennsylvania.

== Biography ==
He was born in Janesville, Wisconsin in 1917 and went to college at Lawrence College and the University of Minnesota. He was ordained deacon in March 1942 by Bishop Frank McElwain, and priest in October 1942 by Bishop Stephen Keeler in the Diocese of Minnesota, having attended Seabury-Western Theological Seminary; after serving in several parishes in the diocese and in the Episcopal Diocese of Eau Claire, he was called as rector of Christ Church, Joliet, Illinois, where he was serving when elected as bishop of Western Michigan. At his consecration in 1960 he was the youngest bishop in the Episcopal Church.

His tenure as bishop was marked by the construction of many new churches and facilities, including the Cathedral Church of Christ the King in Portage, Michigan. He retired on December 1, 1984, and served as assisting bishop in the dioceses of Los Angeles and California. Towards the end of his life he and his wife lived in Menlo Park, California, where he died January 5, 2004, of Alzheimer's disease.

His son John was also an Episcopal priest.
