= Samuel A. McCoskry =

American bishop

The Right Reverend Samuel Allen McCoskry D.D., LL.D., D.C.L.
- Bishop of Michigan
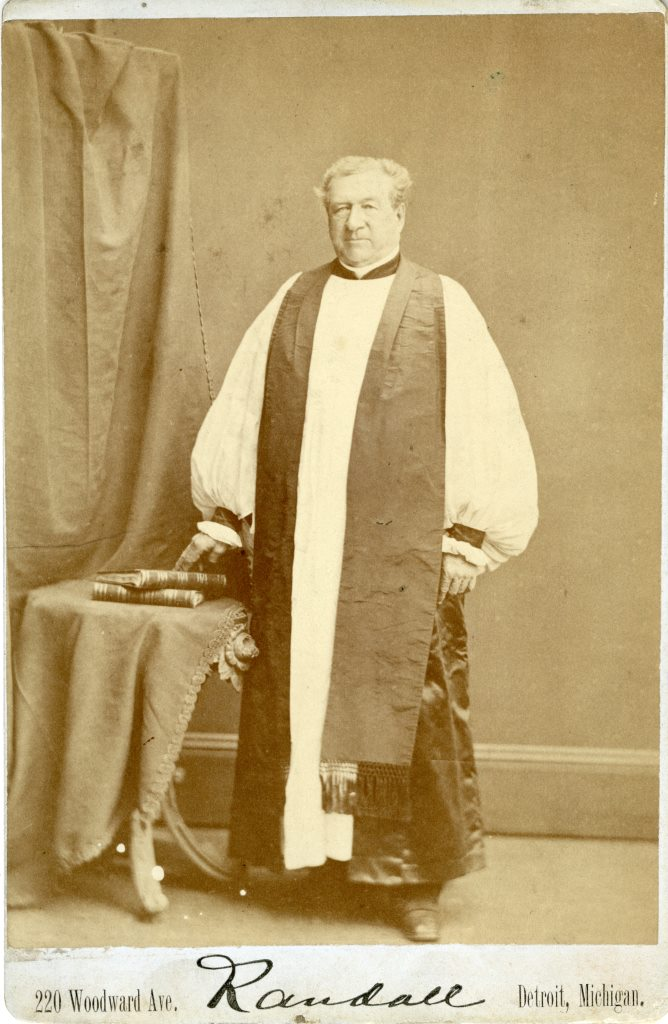
- Church: Episcopal Church
- Diocese: Michigan
- Elected: 1836
- In office: 1836–1878
- Successor: Samuel Smith Harris

Orders
- Ordination: December 13, 1833 by Benjamin T. Onderdonk
- Consecration: July 7, 1836 by Benjamin T. Onderdonk

Personal details
- Born: November 9, 1804 Carlisle, Pennsylvania, United States
- Died: August 1, 1886 (aged 81) New York City, New York, United States
- Denomination: Anglican
- Parents: Samuel Allen McCoskry &
- Spouse: Eliza L. Montgomery & Alison Nisbet
- Education: United States Military Academy, Dickinson College

Samuel Allen McCoskry (November 9, 1804 – August 1, 1886), was the first Bishop of Michigan in the Episcopal Church in the United States of America, but was deposed by the House of Bishops.

== Biography ==
Samuel McCoskry was born in Carlisle, Pennsylvania, on November 9, 1804, the son of Dr Samuel Allen McCoskry, a Physician, and Scottish-born Alison Nisbet. He attended the United States Military Academy for two years, then graduated from Dickinson College in 1825; was ordained deacon and priest in 1833 in Christ Church, Reading, Pennsylvania. After serving as rector of St. Paul's Church, Philadelphia, for two years, he was elected first bishop of the Episcopal Diocese of Michigan and was consecrated at St. Paul's on July 7, 1836. McCrosky resigned in 1878, citing ill health, but allegations of moral misconduct came to light, and he fled to Europe. The House of Bishops was unable to investigate McCoskry because of his absence, so it voted to depose him on the grounds of abandoning his diocese. McCoskry was deposed on December 3, 1878, and died August 1, 1886.

=== Consecrators ===
- The Most Reverend Henry Ustick Onderdonk, 2nd bishop of Pennsylvania
- The Right Reverend George Washington Doane, 2nd bishop of New Jersey
- The Right Reverend Jackson Kemper, missionary bishop to Northwest

Samuel Allen McCoskry was the 32nd bishop consecrated for the Episcopal Church.

== See also ==
- List of Bishop Succession in the Episcopal Church

Episcopal Church (USA) titles
Preceded by New Office	1st Bishop of Michigan; July 7, 1836 – 1878	Succeeded by Samuel Smith Harris
