= Robert R. Gepert =

American bishop

The Right Reverend Robert Ronald Gepert D.D.
- Bishop of Western Michigan
- Church: Episcopal Church
- Diocese: Western Michigan
- Elected: October 19, 2001
- In office: 2002–2013
- Predecessor: Edward Lewis Lee Jr.
- Successor: Whayne M. Hougland Jr.
- Previous post: Coadjutor Bishop of Western Michigan (2002)

Orders
- Ordination: 1985 by John T. Walker
- Consecration: April 27, 2002 by Arthur Benjamin Williams Jr.

Personal details
- Born: August 24, 1948 (age 78) Pittsburgh, Pennsylvania, United States
- Denomination: Anglican (prev. Roman Catholic)
- Education: Point Park University

Robert Ronald Gepert (born August 24, 1948) was eighth bishop of the Episcopal Diocese of Western Michigan, serving from 2002 to 2013.

== Biography ==
Gepert was born on August 24, 1948, in Pittsburgh, Pennsylvania, and was raised as a Roman Catholic. He studied at Point Park University and graduated with a Bachelor of Science in Biology in 1974, and taught in a Washington, D.C., high school for 11 years. After joining the Episcopal Church, Gepert entered the Virginia Theological Seminary, graduating with a Master of Divinity in 1985, after which he was ordained deacon and priest that same year in the Diocese of Washington.

Gepert served as rector of St Paul's Church in Baden, Maryland, and St Mary's Church in Aquasco, Maryland, between 1985 and 1988. He then became rector of St Michael's Church in Birdsboro, Pennsylvania, serving till 1993. During the same time, he undertook postgraduate studies in Family Systems in Bethesda, Maryland, focusing on Family Systems Theory Application to Church Systems, graduating in 1995. He also undertook studies at Princeton Theological Seminary on Clergy Leadership and Spiritual Life, earning a Fellow in Pastoral Leadership Development in 1999. In 1996, Gepert was elected Dean of Trinity Cathedral in Easton, Maryland, a post he retained till 2002. He was awarded a Doctor of Divinity from the Virginia Theological Seminary in 2003.

On October 19, 2001, Gepert was elected on the third ballot as the Bishop of Western Michigan. He was consecrated on April 27, 2002, at the Fountain Street Church in Grand Rapids, Michigan, succeeding as diocesan on July 1, 2002. He retained the bishopric till his retirement in 2013. He then became Bishop Provisional of Central Pennsylvania in 2014, serving till 2015.
