= Prince G. Singh =

Indian-American clergyman

The Right Reverend Prince G. Singh
- VIII Bishop of Rochester
- Church: Episcopal Church
- Diocese: Rochester
- Elected: February 2022
- In office: 2008-2022
- Predecessor: Jack Marston McKelvey
- Successor: Stephen T. Lane
- Other posts: Provisional Bishop of Western Michigan and Bishop of Eastern Michigan (2022-2023)

Orders
- Ordination: 1990
- Consecration: 2008 by Katharine Jefferts Schori

Personal details
- Born: Chennai, Tamil Nadu, India
- Denomination: Anglican
- Spouse: Roja Singh (div. 2022)
- Children: 2

Prince Grenville Singh (born in Chennai, Tamil Nadu, India) served as the eighth Bishop of the Episcopal Diocese of Rochester from 2008 to 2022. He then served as the Bishop Provisional of the Dioceses of Eastern Michigan and Western Michigan from 2022-2023 until his resignation amid a Title IV investigation.

== Ordained ministry ==
Singh studied at the Madras Christian College in Tambaram and the Union Biblical Seminary in Pune, India. In 1990 he was ordained priest of the Church of South India. Before going to the United States he served congregations in India. Between 1997 and 2000 he was associate rector at St Peter's Church in Morristown, New Jersey. In 2000 he became rector of St Alban's Church in Oakland, New Jersey.

He was elected Bishop of Rochester in February 2008 and consecrated on May 31, 2008 with Presiding Bishop Katharine Jefferts Schori as chief consecrator. In February 2022, Bishop Singh resigned from his post as the Bishop of Rochester, to become the Provisional Bishop for the Dioceses of Eastern Michigan and Western Michigan, being installed by Presiding Bishop Michael Curry.

== Allegations of domestic abuse ==
On 14 June 2023, Singh's sons released letters that they sent to Presiding Bishop Michael Curry on 29 December 2022, regarding physical and emotional abuse suffered at the hands of Bishop Singh. His ex-wife Roja also alleges similar abuses perpetrated by Bishop Singh throughout their marriage, which was formally ended on 22 April 2022. [Prince's sons] "seek the resignation and defrocking of [their] father from his role as Provisional Bishop of the Dioceses of Eastern and Western Michigan ... and [they] seek to launch a Title IV investigation of Presiding Bishop Michael Curry and Bishop Todd Ousley for mishandling [their] serious allegations of abuse." Promptly after the publication of the letters in June, the provisional bishop of Rochester, Stephen Lane, directed that a Title IV investigation of Singh be begun. Bishop Singh maintains that he is innocent and welcomed a formal investigation as, "the appropriate way to clear these painful allegations."

Singh's ministry was restricted on 7 September 2023 in response to the ongoing Title IV investigation, and he resigned as Bishop Provisional the following day.

In December 2024, Presiding Bishop Sean Rowe reached an accord with Singh according to which he will be suspended from the ministry for at least three years from that date.

== See also ==
- List of Episcopal bishops of the United States
- Historical list of the Episcopal bishops of the United States
