= Howard Meeks =

The Right Reverend Howard Samuel Meeks Jr.
- Bishop of Western Michigan
- Church: Episcopal Church
- Diocese: Western Michigan
- Elected: 1984
- In office: 1984–1988
- Predecessor: Charles E. Bennison Sr.
- Successor: Edward Lewis Lee Jr.
- Previous post: Coadjutor Bishop of Western Michigan (1984)

Orders
- Ordination: December 1964
- Consecration: October 6, 1984 by John Allin
- Laicized: February 2008

Personal details
- Born: November 29, 1932 Upland, Pennsylvania, United States
- Died: May 13, 2016 (aged 83) Winter Garden, Florida, US
- Buried: Arlington National Cemetery
- Denomination: Anglican
- Parents: Howard Samuel Meeks & Edith May Flounders
- Spouse: Anne Sanderson Vail (m. 1953; died 2005)
- Children: 3

Howard Samuel Meeks Jr. (November 29, 1932 – May 13, 2016) was the sixth bishop of the Episcopal Diocese of Western Michigan between 1984 and 1988.

== Early life ==
Meeks was born on November 29, 1932, in Upland, Pennsylvania, the son of Howard Samuel Meeks and Edith May Flounders. He was educated in Chester High School, graduating in 1951. He then studied at the Goldey–Beacom College from where he earned an Associate’s Degree in Accounting and Business Administration, after which he worked for General Chemical in Claymont, Delaware. He also joined the United States Navy Reserve and was engaged in active duty between 1954 and 1956, serving on the USS Daly where he achieved the rank of Personnelman Petty Officer 3rd Class. After being discharged, Meeks worked for Sun Oil Company in Marcus Hook, Pennsylvania, whilst studying for a Bachelor’s degree at Pennsylvania Military College. After a while, he enrolled for a Master of Divinity from the Episcopal Divinity School in Philadelphia, graduating with a Master of Divinity in 1962.

== Ordained ministry ==
Meeks was ordained as a priest in December 1964. He served as assistant rector at St Paul’s Church in Chester, Pennsylvania, the Church of the Holy Trinity in West Chester, Pennsylvania, and St Thomas' Church in Terrace Park, Ohio. He then became rector of the Church of the Nativity in New Castle, Delaware, and in 1973, became rector of St Andrew’s Church in Fort Pierce, Florida.

== Bishop and resignation ==
Meeks was elected as the Bishop Coadjutor to the Diocese of Western Michigan in 1984, and was consecrated on October 6, 1984. He then succeeded as diocesan on December 1, 1984. He only served four years as bishop, resigning in January 1988, becoming effective on February 1, 1988. After his resignation, he worked as a representative of Food for the Poor.

Meeks resigned his Holy Orders in the Episcopal Church on December 20, 2007, becoming effective in February 2008. He died in Winter Garden, Florida, on May 13, 2016.
