= Saint James' Episcopal Church (Sault Ste. Marie, Michigan) =

Historic church in Michigan, United States

- U.S. National Register of Historic Places
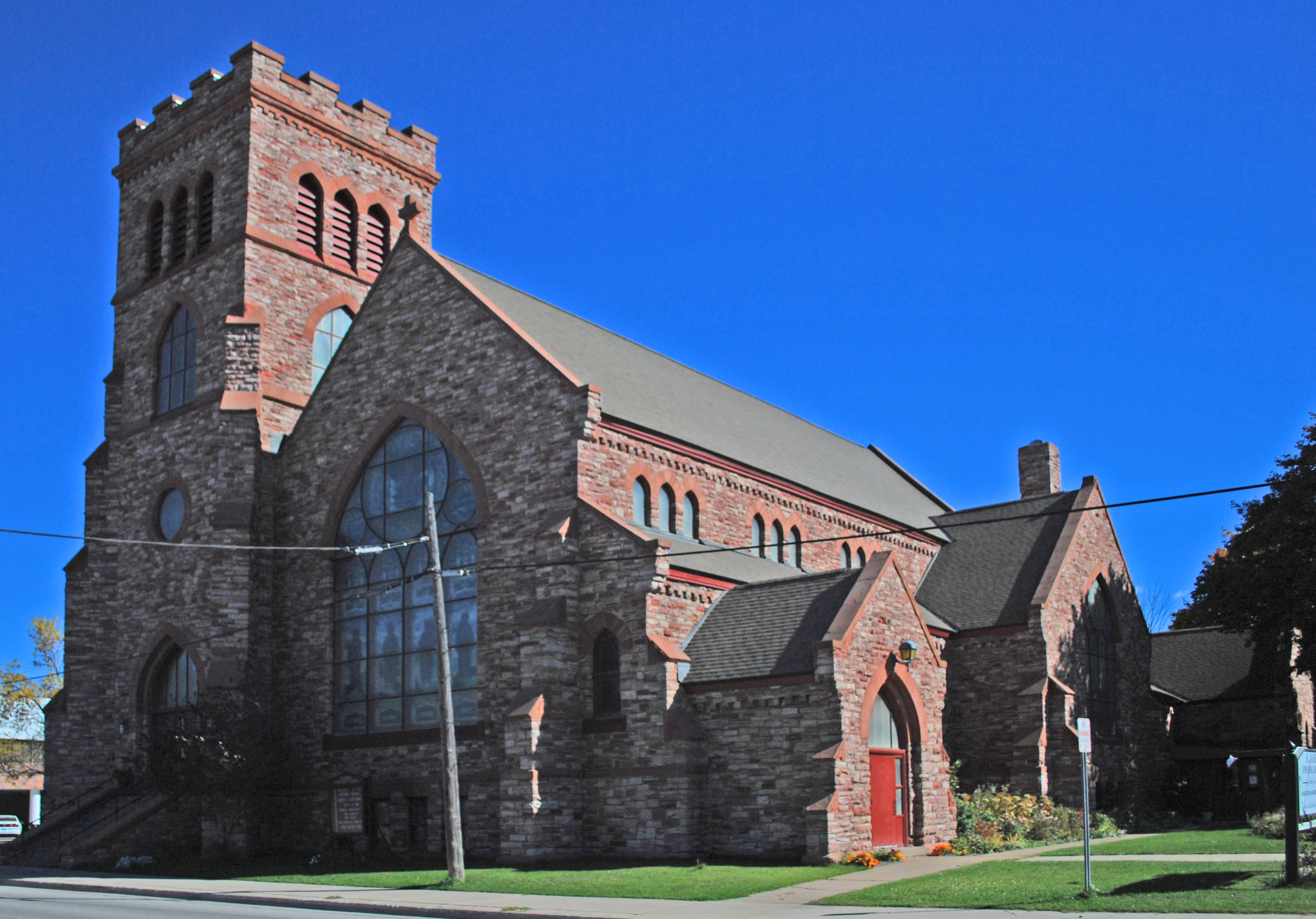

- Location within Michigan Location within the United States
- Interactive map
- Location: 533 Bingham Ave., Sault Ste. Marie, Michigan
- Coordinates: 46°29′44″N 84°20′48″W
- Area: 0.3 acres (0.12 ha)
- Built: 1902-03
- Architect: Teague, James C.
- Architectural style: Late Gothic Revival
- NRHP reference No.: 98000272
- Added to NRHP: April 1, 1998

Saint James' Episcopal Church is a historic church at 533 Bingham Avenue in Sault Ste. Marie, Michigan. It was added to the National Register of Historic Places in 1998.

== History ==
In 1832, an Episcopal mission was established in Sault Ste. Marie. The mission was in existence for only a few years until it was discontinued. In 1880, the Rt. Rev. S. S. Harris, Bishop of Michigan, visited the city and arranged for the commencement of Episcopal services. A mission was established later that year, and a permanent church building opened in late 1881. By 1885, the congregation had grown enough to be incorporated as a parish. The congregation continued growing, and soon the original church proved inadequate and plans were made to construct a new building.

The current St. James' Episcopal Church was built in 1902-03 during a boom in canal building in Sault Ste Marie. The construction of the church left the congregation heavily in debt, and the cost of building the church was not paid off until 1919. The church itself was consecrated on April 17, 1919.

A new organ was installed in 1926. In 1952, to commemorate the 50th anniversary of the building, the church was extensively refurbished. The church is still used by the congregation as of 2012.

== Description ==
St. James' Episcopal Church is a Late Gothic Revival structure built in a cruciform plan. A square tower sits at one front corner. The exterior walls are constructed of red-brown sandstone with red sandstone trim. Groups of three arched windows are located in the clerestories The street front and transepts each contain a large Gothic-arched window.

The interior contains hammered ceiling beams and hand carved figures of the four Evangelists on the reredos. The church also contains four Tiffany stained glass windows; the west window, featuring the apostles, is the third largest stained glass window in the state.
