= John N. McCormick =

American bishop

The Right Reverend John Newton McCormick D.D.
- Bishop of Western Michigan
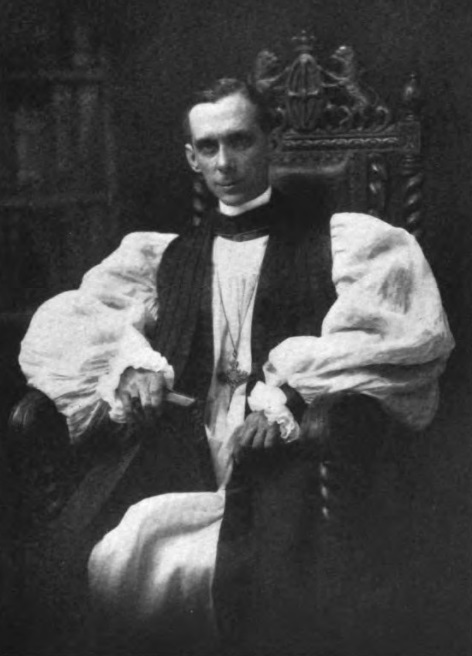
- Church: Episcopal Church
- Diocese: Western Michigan
- Elected: December 1905
- In office: 1909–1937
- Predecessor: George D. Gillespie
- Successor: Lewis Bliss Whittemore
- Previous post: Coadjutor Bishop of Western Michigan (1906-1909)

Orders
- Ordination: March 16, 1894 by Alfred Magill Randolph
- Consecration: February 14, 1906 by Daniel S. Tuttle

Personal details
- Born: February 1, 1863 Richmond, Virginia, United States
- Died: November 26, 1939 (aged 76) Grand Rapids, Michigan, United States
- Buried: Oakhill Cemetery, Grand Rapids, Michigan
- Denomination: Anglican
- Parents: John McCormick & Virginia Newton
- Spouse: Maud Howard Richards (died 1888) Bessie Chapman Tucker (m. 1889; died 1938)
- Children: 5

John Newton McCormick (February 1, 1863 - November 26, 1939) was bishop of Western Michigan in The Episcopal Church. He was the author of Good News from a Far Country and A Small Part.

== Early life and education ==
McCormick was born on February 1, 1863, in Richmond, Virginia, the son of John McCormick and Virginia Newton. He studied at the Randolph–Macon College, and graduated with a Bachelor of Arts and a Bachelor of Divinity in 1883. He also did postgraduate studies at Johns Hopkins University between 1886 and 1888. He was awarded an honorary Doctor of Divinity from the University of the South in 1903. On October 9, 1889, he married Bessie Chapman Tucker in Baltimore.

== Career ==
McCormick was ordained deacon in 1883 and priest in 1884 in the Methodist Episcopal Church. He then served as pastor in Frederick, Maryland, between 1884 and 1885, Arlington, Maryland, between 1885 and 1887, Trinity Church in Baltimore between 1888 and 1889, and in Winchester, Virginia, between 1890 and 1891. McCormick then joined the Episcopal Church, being ordained a deacon on December 4, 1893, and priest on March 16, 1894, by the Bishop of Southern Virginia Alfred Magill Randolph.

He served as rector of St Paul’s Church in Suffolk, Virginia, between 1893 and 1895, rector of St Luke’s Church in Atlanta, Georgia, between 1895 and 1898, and rector of St Mark’s Church in Grand Rapids, Michigan, between 1898 and 1906.

== Bishop ==
McCormick was elected Coadjutor Bishop of Western Michigan in December 1905, and was consecrated on February 14, 1906, by Presiding Bishop Daniel S. Tuttle. He then succeeded as diocesan bishop on March 19, 1909, retaining the post till his retirement in 1937. McCormick also served as Bishop in charge of the American churches in Europe, represented the war communications of the Episcopal Church in France between 1917 and 1919, and was a major in the American Red Cross, in charge of Red Cross Chaplain’s Bureau. Consequently, he was known as the Bishop of the Trenches. He died of heart disease in his home in Grand Rapids, Michigan, on November 26, 1939.
