= Bonnie Perry =

11th Episcopal Bishop of Michigan

The Right Reverend Bonnie A. Perry SCP
- Bishop of Michigan
- Perry (left) in 2026
- Church: Episcopal Church
- Diocese: Michigan
- Elected: June 1, 2019
- In office: 2020–present
- Predecessor: Wendell Gibbs

Orders
- Ordination: December 15, 1990 by John Shelby Spong
- Consecration: February 8, 2020 by Michael Curry

Personal details
- Born: April 15, 1962 (age 64) San Diego, California, U.S.
- Denomination: Anglican (prev. Roman Catholic)
- Parents: Ray & Mary Jane Perry
- Spouse: Susan Harlow
- Education: College of the Holy Cross (BS); Union Theological Seminary (MDiv); Seabury-Western Theological Seminary (DMin)

Bonnie Anne Perry (born April 15, 1962) is a bishop in the Episcopal Church in the United States of America. She was elected the eleventh diocesan bishop of the Diocese of Michigan on June 1, 2019, making her the first woman and first openly-lesbian priest elected as an Episcopal bishop in Michigan.

== Early life and education ==
Perry was born on April 15, 1962, in San Diego, California, as the oldest of four children to Ray and Mary Jane Perry. Her father was a member of the United States Marine Corps.

Perry graduated from the College of the Holy Cross in Worcester, Massachusetts, with a Bachelor of Science in biology in 1984. She then earned a Master of Divinity in practical theology in 1988 from Union Theological Seminary, where she met her spouse Susan Harlow.

In 1998, Perry earned her Doctor of Ministry specializing in congregational development from Seabury-Western Theological Seminary. Her doctoral dissertation was titled, Visions for Vitality: A Study of Three Vigorous, Cutting-Edge Congregations.

== Ministry ==
Perry was ordained a deacon on June 2, 1990, then as a priest on December 15, 1990, in the Diocese of Newark by Bishop John Shelby Spong. She served as Associate Rector for Christ Church in Ridgewood NJ from 1989 to 1991, then Interim Rector for St. Peter's Episcopal Church, Clifton NJ from September 1991 to October 1992. She served as Congregational Development Vicar for All Saints Episcopal Church, Chicago, from 1992 to 2000, then as their rector from 2000 to 2019.

She was a candidate for Bishop of Minnesota in 2009.

=== Bishop of Michigan ===
In 2019, Perry was elected the Diocese of Michigan's eleventh diocesan bishop. She was consecrated on February 8, 2020, by Michael Curry.

In February 2022, Bishop Perry joined other faith and community leaders in co-founding the group, End Gun Violence Michigan.

On Nov. 30, 2023, Bishop Perry was appointed by Michigan Gov. Gretchen Whitmer to the state's first-ever LGBTQ+ Commission.

== See also ==
- List of Episcopal bishops of the United States
- Historical list of the Episcopal bishops of the United States

Episcopal Church (USA) titles
Preceded by Wendell Gibbs	11th Bishop of Michigan; 2020–present	Incumbent
