= Lewis Bliss Whittemore =

American clergyman

The Right Reverend Lewis Bliss Whittemore D.D.
- Bishop of Western Michigan
- Church: Episcopal Church
- Diocese: Western Michigan
- Elected: 1936
- In office: 1937–1953
- Predecessor: John N. McCormick
- Successor: Dudley B. McNeil
- Previous post: Coadjutor Bishop of Western Michigan (1936–1937)

Orders
- Ordination: May 13, 1916 by William Lawrence
- Consecration: May 1, 1936 by James De Wolf Perry

Personal details
- Born: June 17, 1885 Hartford, Connecticut, U.S.
- Died: December 5, 1965 (aged 80) Vineyard Haven, Massachusetts, U.S.
- Denomination: Anglican
- Parents: William Emmons Whittemore & Mary Bliss Robinson
- Spouse: Helen Marie Crawford (m. 1917)
- Children: 3
- Education: Yale College

Lewis Bliss Whittemore (June 17, 1885 – December 5, 1965) was the third bishop of the Episcopal Diocese of Western Michigan.

== Early life and education ==
Whittemore was born in Hartford, Connecticut, on June 17, 1885, the son of William Emmons Whittemore and Mary Bliss Robinson. He attended local Hartford schools until he had completed the high school course in 1902. He studied at Yale College, graduating with a Bachelor of Arts in 1907, after which he became a supervising teacher in the Philippines for three years. Upon his return to the United States, he attended the Episcopal Theological School at Cambridge, Massachusetts, graduating with a Bachelor of Divinity in 1915.

== Career ==
Whittemore was ordained deacon in May 1915, and priest in May 1916 by Bishop William Lawrence of Massachusetts. He served as assistant at Christ Church in New York City from 1915 to 1917, before transferring to Pittsburgh to become assistant at Calvary Church, where he remained until 1923. In 1923, he became rector of Trinity Church in Detroit, while in 1927 he became rector of Grace Church in Grand Rapids, Michigan.

== Bishop ==
On May 1, 1936, Whittemore was consecrated Coadjutor Bishop of Western Michigan, and then succeeded as diocesan bishop on November 1, 1937. Whittemore retired in 1953, and died on December 5, 1965, in Vineyard Haven, Massachusetts. He was reported to have delivered the first radio broadcast sermon in history in 1921.

== Bibliography ==
- The Care of All the Churches: The Background, Work, and Opportunity of the American Episcopate (Seabury Press, 1955)
- Ye Shall Live Also (Morehouse-Barlow, 1960)
- The Church and Secular Education (1960)
