= Whayne M. Hougland Jr. =

American bishop

Whayne M. Hougland
- Former Bishop of Western Michigan
- Church: Episcopal Church
- Diocese: Western Michigan
- Elected: May 18, 2013
- In office: 2013–2021
- Predecessor: Robert R. Gepert
- Successor: Prince G. Singh
- Other post: Provisional Bishop of Eastern Michigan (2019-2021)

Orders
- Ordination: December 19, 1998
- Consecration: September 28, 2013 by Katharine Jefferts Schori

Personal details
- Denomination: Anglican
- Spouse: Dana Lynne Hougland
- Children: 2
- Education: University of Kentucky; University of the South

Whayne Miller Hougland Jr. is a former bishop of the Episcopal Diocese of Western Michigan and the Episcopal Diocese of Eastern Michigan who resigned after being suspended for engaging in an extramarital affair.

== Biography ==
Hougland graduated with a Bachelor of Arts from the University of Kentucky in 1986, and a Master of Divinity from the University of the South in 1998 and a Doctor of Ministry in Preaching in 2015. He was ordained to the diaconate on June 13, 1998, and to the priesthood on December 19, 1998. He served as rector of St. Luke's Church in Salisbury, North Carolina. He was consecrated as a bishop on September 28, 2013.

Hougland resigned his roles as bishop effective July 1, 2021 after he admitted to, and was suspended for, an extramarital affair. He was reinstated to the House of Bishops in March 2022.

== Suspension and resignation ==
Sometime in 2020, the husband of a woman with whom Bishop Hougland had an affair called the Presiding Bishop's office to report the same. When contacted by the Presiding Bishop's office, Hougland admitted to misconduct and asked for help. The diocese was notified of Hougland's misconduct in June 2020. Hougland was subsequently suspended for a minimum of one year after admitting to "serious mistakes" and participating in an extramarital affair. In a letter to the clergy and people of both of the dioceses that he leads, Hougland admitted to having not honored his "ordination vows or my wedding vows." He also apologized for a "gross lapse of moral judgement and for "weakening" the moral authority of Episcopal clergy.

Hougland's relationship of an inappropriate sexual nature and the church's response to it were openly criticized by clergy and laity from within the diocese after his suspension lead to a lack of pastoral leadership in both of the dioceses he shepherded during the COVID-19 pandemic.

After Hougland admitted to having a sexual relationship with a woman who was not a member of the Episcopal Church, he was placed on a one-year paid leave. He reached a separation agreement with both dioceses that he had previously served and resigned both his posts effective July 1, 2021.

== Fallout ==
In 2022, the Diocese of Eastern Michigan and the Diocese of Western Michigan submitted a Memorial to the 80th General Convention of the Episcopal Church. In this report the dioceses noted that after Hougland took a leave of absence, they "paid out hundreds of thousands of dollars" to Hougland and his household per the agreement that had been reached between Hougland and the Presiding Bishop. It also noted that Hougland had "received a forty percent increase upon assuming responsibility for both dioceses." The report complained that "there was very little further investigation into whether there was only one offense" and that not enough time had been given "to determine if the matter should have been considered sexual misconduct due to the identity of the other party involved in the bishop's affair." It also noted that "when our former bishop had an affair, the system not only took care of him, it did so in extremely expensive ways, to the financial and emotional cost of those who he had vowed to pastor."

The report also noted that "the dioceses were hurt by the affair itself. Relationships and trust were damaged. The financial support expected from us for the one who had violated these relationships was not only surprising, it was unjust."

== Bellwether Farm ==
The Episcopal Diocese of Ohio hired Hougland to serve as the transitional director of Bellwether Farm.

== See also ==
- List of Episcopal bishops of the United States
- Historical list of the Episcopal bishops of the United States
