= Cathedral Church of St. Paul (Michigan) =

Historic church in Michigan, United States

- Cathedral Church of St. Paul Complex
- U.S. National Register of Historic Places
- Michigan State Historic Site
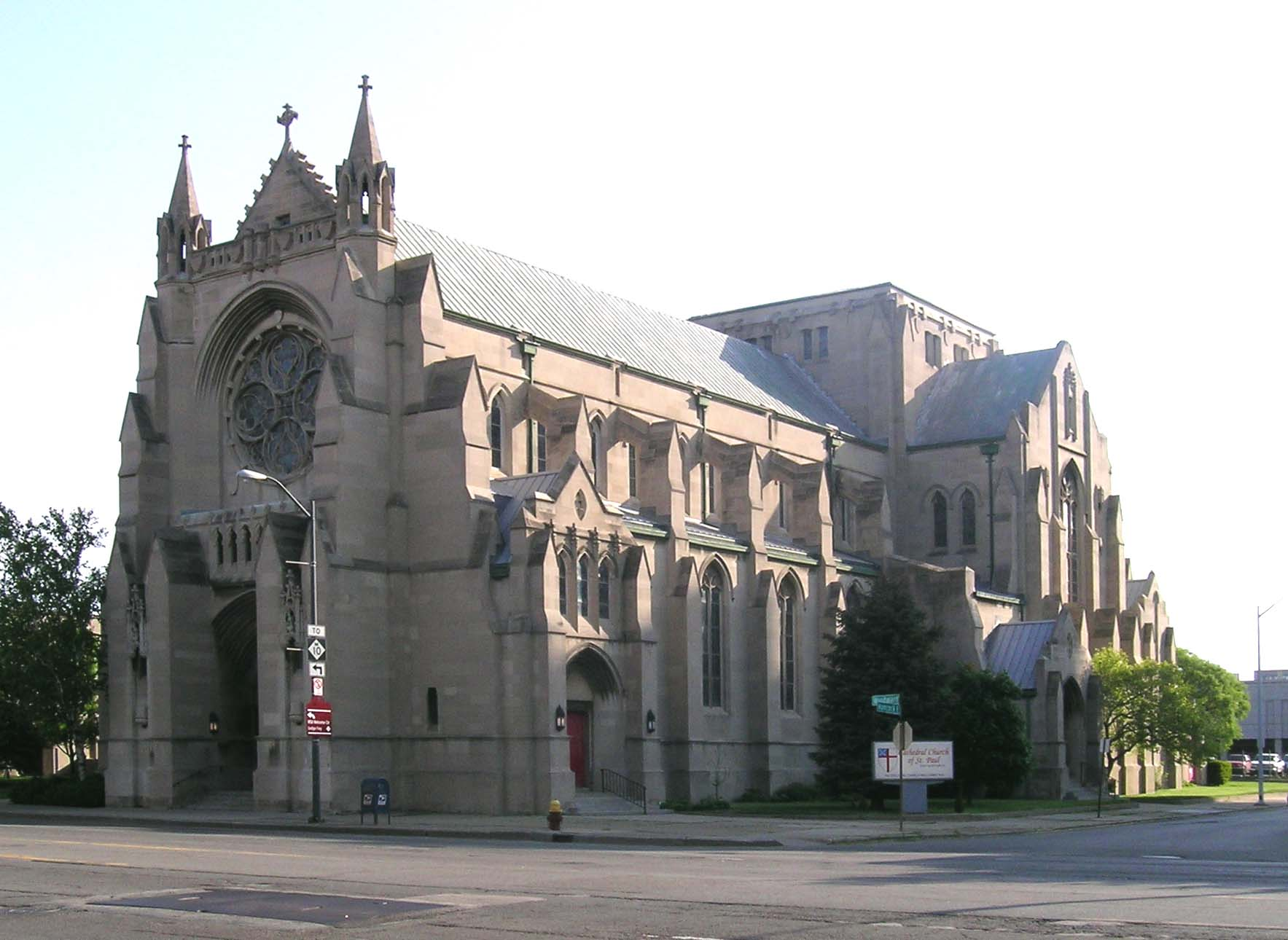
- Interactive map
- Location: 4800 Woodward Avenue; Detroit, Michigan
- Coordinates: 42°21′22.43″N 83°3′49.66″W
- Built: 1907–8
- Architect: Ralph A. Cram
- Architectural style: Late Gothic Revival
- MPS: Religious Structures of Woodward Ave. TR
- NRHP reference No.: 82002893

Significant dates
- Added to NRHP: August 3, 1982
- Designated MSHS: August 3, 1982

The Cathedral Church of St. Paul is the cathedral church of the Episcopal Diocese of Michigan. In 1824 its congregation formed as the first Episcopal and first Protestant church in the Michigan Territory.

The cathedral reported 489 members in 2018 and 337 members in 2023; no membership statistics were reported nationally in 2024 parochial reports. Plate and pledge income reported for the congregation in 2024 was $282,890. Average Sunday attendance (ASA) in 2024 was 154 persons, down from a reported 217 in 2015.

Designed by architect Ralph Adams Cram and constructed in 1907, this building is located at 4800 Woodward Avenue in Midtown Detroit, Michigan, adjacent to the campus of Wayne State University. It was listed on the National Register of Historic Places in 1982.

== History ==
The parish of St. Paul was founded in 1824, by the Rev. Richard Fish Cadle, as the first Episcopal and the first Protestant congregation in what was then Michigan Territory. The original site of St. Paul's church was on Woodward Avenue, between Congress and Larned. In 1851 the church moved to the corner of Congress at Shelby.

The funeral service for Henry Ford, the entrepreneur who catalyzed development of the automobile industry in Detroit, was held at Cathedral Church of St. Paul on Thursday, April 10, 1947. Mourners passed by at a rate of 5,000 each hour at the public viewing the day before at Ford's Greenfield Village in Dearborn. At the funeral service, 20,000 people stood outside the Cathedral Church of St. Paul in the rain with 600 inside. The funeral had attracted national attention and an estimated seven million people mourned his death.

== Architecture ==
The current building, designed by renowned church architect Ralph Adams Cram, dates from 1907. It remains unfinished, the bell tower never having been completed. The church is built of limestone, using medieval construction techniques, with no supporting steel superstructure. The building boasts soaring, pointed arches, wide expanses of stained glass, and elaborate tracery, exemplary of Gothic architecture. It includes a large architectural installation of Pewabic Pottery. In 1912 it was designated as the cathedral of the diocese.

== Significance ==
St. Paul's Cathedral is an example of the Late Gothic Revival, an architectural style popular in the early years of the 20th century. American architects of the mid-19th century imported and re-interpreted the English Gothic Revival style, based on the visually lush details of Medieval cathedrals. This was the period of the Oxford Movement in England, which also influenced Episcopal clergy and congregations in the United States to commission revivals of Medieval styles. American architects copied the "Gothic" elements and combined them with simple building plans to create an American architectural style known as "Victorian Gothic." The Fort Street Presbyterian Church, built in 1876 in Detroit, is a premier example of early Victorian Gothic architecture.

In contrast, in the early 20th century more American architects attended new schools at M.I.T. and Columbia, or traveled to France for training at the École des Beaux-Arts. These architects, including Ralph A. Cram, believed that Gothic architecture should be developed from, rather than simply copy, the architecture of Medieval churches. St. Paul's Cathedral is one of Cram's major early projects, one that defines his "Late Gothic Revival" style.

== Present use ==
The current dean is the Very Reverend Joseph C. Alsay, formerly Rector of St. Augustine of Canterbury in Oklahoma City. The cathedral coordinates programming with the Detroit Cultural Center. The Cathedral Choir School offers free music education to children in metropolitan Detroit. Participants frequently take part in performances by the Cathedral Choir.

== See also ==
- List of the Episcopal cathedrals of the United States
- List of cathedrals in the United States
