= Todd Ousley =

American prelate of the Episcopal Church

The Right Reverend Todd Ousley
- Bishop Provisional of Wyoming
- Church: Episcopal Church
- Diocese: Wyoming
- In office: Since 2025
- Predecessor: Paul G. Chandler
- Previous posts: Bishop of Eastern Michigan (2006-2017); Bishop of the Office of Pastoral Development (2017–2024)

Orders
- Ordination: February 1, 1992 by Maurice Benitez
- Consecration: September 9, 2006 by Wendell Gibbs

Personal details
- Born: Palestine, Texas, United States
- Denomination: Anglican
- Spouse: Ann
- Children: 3

Todd Ousley is an American bishop of the Episcopal Church serving since 2025 as bishop provisional of Wyoming. He was previously bishop for the Office of Pastoral Development from 2017 to 2024. Between 2006 and 2017, he served as the second bishop of Eastern Michigan.

== Biography ==
Ousley was born in Waco, Texas, and studied at Texas A&M University between 1979 and 1981 and again in 1984 when he earned a Master of Arts. He also graduated from Baylor University in 1983. He graduated with a Master of Divinity from the Episcopal Theological Seminary of the Southwest in 1991, and a Doctor of Ministry in congregational development from Seabury-Western Theological Seminary in 2004.

He was ordained to the priesthood on February 1, 1992. He served as curate at the Church of the Good Shepherd in Austin, Texas between 1991 and 1993. He then became rector of the Church of the Holy Comforter in Angleton, Texas in 1993, while in 1997, he became rector of St Francis' Church in Temple, Texas. In 2001 he became canon to the ordinary at Episcopal Diocese of Eastern Michigan.

On May 6, 2006, Ousley was elected Coadjutor Bishop of Eastern Michigan and was consecrated as a bishop on September 9, 2006. He resigned his post in 2017 after he was named Bishop for the Office of Pastoral Development. In January 2025 he was nominated to be the provisional bishop of the Episcopal Diocese of Wyoming. A special diocesan convention approved his nomination on March 2, 2025.

== See also ==
- List of Episcopal bishops of the United States
- Historical list of the Episcopal bishops of the United States
