= Province 5 of the Episcopal Church =

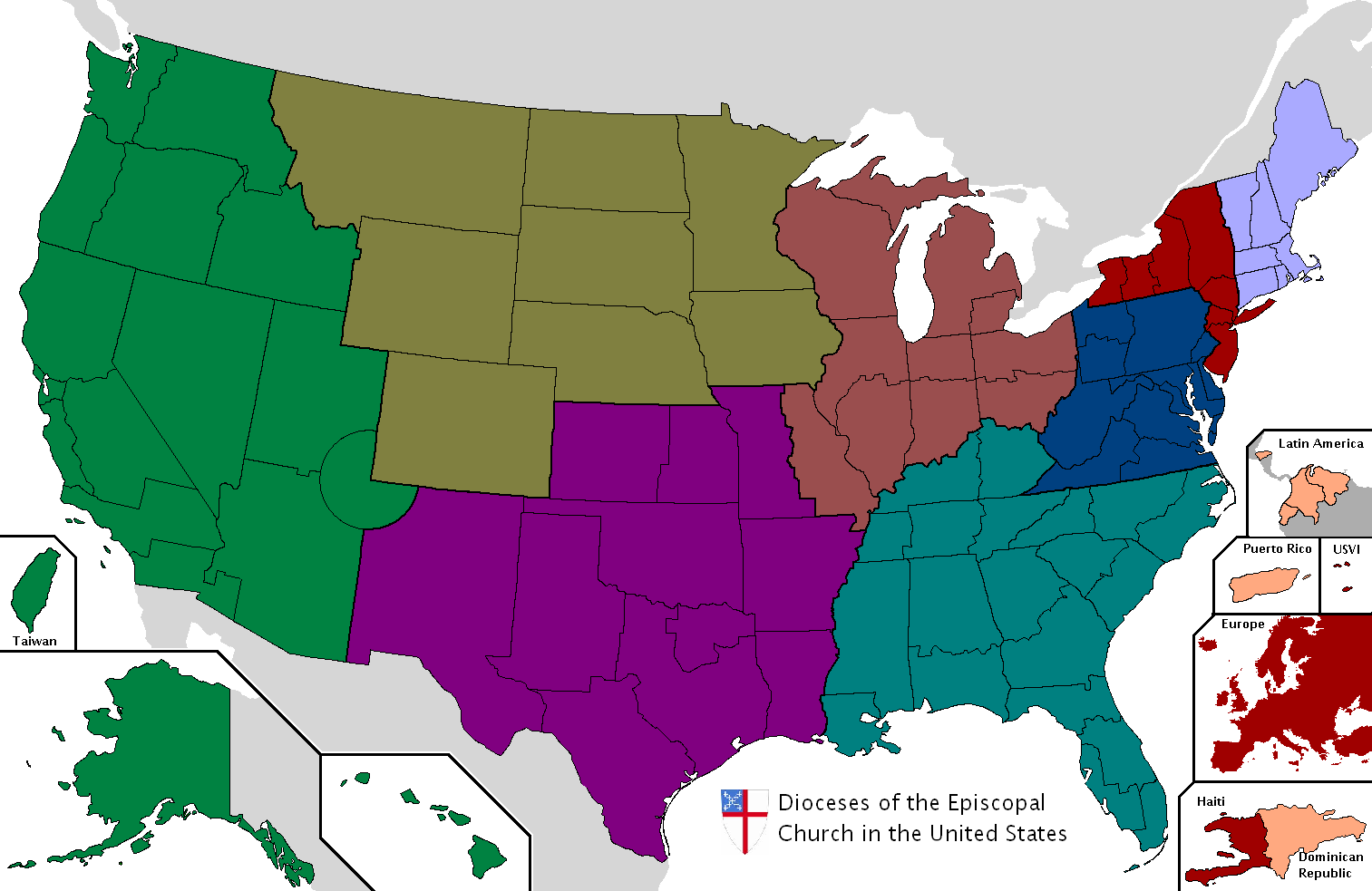
Province V of the ECUSA

Province 5 (V), also called the Province of the Midwest, is one of nine ecclesiastical provinces making up the Episcopal Church in the United States of America. It comprises eleven dioceses across the six midwestern states of Illinois, Indiana, Michigan, Missouri, Ohio, and Wisconsin. Mr. Rick Stanitis of the Diocese of Northern Michigan serves as President and the Right Rev. Dr. Bonnie A. Perry of the Diocese of Michigan serves as Vice President.

Statistically, the province reported 121,192 members in 2015 and 91,150 members in 2023. Plate and pledge income for the 704 filing congregations of the province in 2024 was $123,558,463. Average Sunday attendance (ASA) was 35,009 persons. This was a decrease from ASA of 47,890 in 2015.

== Dioceses of Province V ==
- Diocese of Chicago
- Diocese of the Great Lakes
- Diocese of Indianapolis
- Diocese of Michigan
- Diocese of Missouri
- Diocese of Northern Indiana
- Diocese of Northern Michigan
- Diocese of Ohio
- Diocese of Southern Ohio
- Diocese of Springfield
- Diocese of Wisconsin

== References and external links ==
- ECUSA Province Directory (2010 archived version)
- Province V website

Specific
