= Enrique Treviño Cruz =

Mexican Anglican bishop (born 1959)

The Most Reverend Enrique Treviño Cruz
- Archbishop of Mexico (Note: Treviño's status as archbishop of Mexico was disputed within the church, but he was recognized as primate and archbishop by the Anglican Communion Office.); Bishop of Cuernavaca
- Church: Anglican Church of Mexico
- Diocese: Cuernavaca
- In office: 2022–2026
- Predecessor: Francisco Manuel Moreno
- Successor: Alba Sally Sue Hernandez

Orders
- Consecration: 23 February 2013

Personal details
- Born: 1959 (age 66–67) Poza Rica, Veracruz, Mexico

Enrique Treviño Cruz (born 1959) is a Mexican Anglican bishop. He has served since 2013 as Bishop of Cuernavaca in the Anglican Church of Mexico and from 2022 to 2026 as primate and archbishop of the church.

== Life and career ==
Treviño was born in 1959 in Poza Rica, Veracruz. He is married to María Eugenia Salgado and they have three children. In addition to his theological studies, Treviño has a bachelor's degree in teaching and a master's degree in science.

In 2013, Treviño was elected bishop of the Diocese of Cuernavaca. In 2020, after the retirement of Francisco Manuel Moreno, Treviño became acting primate of the Anglican Church of Mexico.

=== Controversy over primacy ===
Controversy in the church erupted after an April 2022 diocesan election to replace Moreno as bishop of northern Mexico. Five clergy said they were prevented from participating in the election, which resulted in Oscar Pulido becoming bishop-elect amid claims of interference in the election. Shortly thereafter, competing delegations from the Diocese of Northern Mexico presented themselves for admission to the church's national synod in June 2022, one led by Pulido and another led by Moreno. As acting primate, Treviño recognized the Pulido-led delegation and Treviño was, during the synod, elected and formally installed as primate. He afterwards consecrated Pulido as Bishop of Northern Mexico.

The controversy resulted in division among the leaders of the Anglican Church of Mexico. The bishop of Southeastern Mexico, Julio César Martín-Trejo, and the bishop of Western Mexico, Ricardo Gomez Osnaya, sided with Moreno, while the bishop of Mexico, Alba Sally Hernandez, sided with Treviño and Pulido. Martín and Gomez claimed the election of Treviño as primate was invalid. They also challenged the addition of Pulido and Hernandez to the Anglican Church of Mexico's board during a meeting they were excluded from, alleging procedural irregularities in the process. Treviño alleged irregularities and "actions contrary to canon law" by Martín and Gomez.

In 2023, Martín, Gomez and Moreno constituted a board claiming to be the Anglican Church of Mexico's legal governing board. In doing so, they voted to strip Treviño of his primacy and install Francisco Moreno as acting primate. According to news reports, "the dissenting bishops retain control of the financial accounts of the Diocese of the North and the Province of Mexico". However, according to Linda Nicholls, regional Anglican primate for the Americas, the Anglican Communion Office would continue to recognize Treviño as primate. In 2026,

In March 2026, Treviño was succeeded as archbishop by Bishop of Mexico Alba Sally Sue Hernandez.

== Notes ==
Anglican Communion titles
| Preceded by Francisco Manuel Moreno | Archbishop of Mexico; 2022–2026; Acting: 2020–2022 | Succeeded by Alba Sally Sue Hernandez |
