= Herman Page =

Herman Page may refer to:

- Herman L. Page (1818–1873), merchant and mayor of Milwaukee, Wisconsin
- Herman Page (father) (1866–1942), fifth bishop of Episcopal Diocese of Michigan and fourth bishop of Episcopal Diocese of Northern Michigan
- Herman Page (son), fifth bishop of the Episcopal Diocese of Northern Michigan
