= Frank W. Creighton =

American Episcopal bishop (1879–1948)

The Right Reverend Frank Whittington Creighton D.D., S.T.D.
- Bishop of Michigan
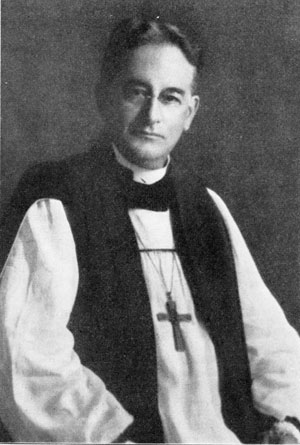
- Creighton circa 1920s
- Church: Episcopal Church
- Diocese: Michigan
- Elected: January 27, 1937
- In office: 1940–1948
- Predecessor: Herman Page
- Successor: Richard S. M. Emrich
- Previous posts: Bishop of Mexico (1926-1933); Suffragan Bishop of Long Island (1933-1937); Coadjutor Bishop of Michigan (1937-1940)

Orders
- Ordination: June 24, 1915 by Philip M. Rhinelander
- Consecration: January 12, 1926 by John Gardner Murray

Personal details
- Born: December 3, 1879 Philadelphia, Pennsylvania, U.S.
- Died: December 23, 1948 (aged 69) Washington, D.C., U.S.
- Buried: St Paul's Cathedral
- Denomination: Anglican
- Parents: Thomas Creighton and Elizabeth Whittington
- Spouse: Maude R. Hawk
- Children: 2

Frank Whittington Creighton (December 3, 1879 – December 23, 1948) was an American Episcopal bishop.

He was the second missionary bishop of the Diocese of Mexico, sixth bishop of the Diocese of Michigan, and a suffragan bishop of the Diocese of Long Island in the Episcopal Church in the United States of America.

== Early life and education ==
Creighton was born on December 3, 1879, in Philadelphia, the son of Thomas Creighton and Elizabeth Whittington. He was educated at the Northeast Manual Training School and Brown's College Preparatory School in Philadelphia. Between 1898 and 1912, he was engaged in business. He graduated with a Bachelor of Sacred Theology in 1915, after studying at the Philadelphia Divinity School. The same institution awarded him a Doctor of Sacred Theology in 1926, while Kenyon College awarded him a Doctor of Divinity in 1940.

== Ordained ministry ==
Creighton was ordained deacon in 1914 and priest on June 24, 1915, by Bishop Philip M. Rhinelander of Pennsylvania. He then served as vicar of the Church of the Redeemer in Andalusia, Pennsylvania. In 1916, he became rector of St. Andrew's Church in Albany, New York. He also served as rector of St Ann's Church in Brooklyn, New York City between 1923 and 1926.

== Bishop ==
Creighton served in a number of episcopal positions. He raised to the episcopate when he was elected Missionary Bishop of Mexico in 1925. He was consecrated bishop on January 12, 1926, in St Ann's Church, Brooklyn, by Presiding Bishop John Gardner Murray. He served as executive secretary of the Department of Domestic Missions of the Episcopal Church between 1930 and 1933. He remained in Mexico until his election as Suffragan Bishop of Long Island and Archdeacon of Queens and Nassau on February 14, 1933. On January 27, 1937, Creighton was elected Coadjutor Bishop of Michigan, and was installed as coadjutor on May 2, 1937. He succeeded as diocesan bishop in 1940. In 1947, he was involved in controversy over the remarriage of divorced persons. He died in office on December 23, 1948.

== Family ==
His son, William Forman Creighton, was the fifth bishop of the Episcopal Diocese of Washington, and grandson, Michael W. Creighton, was the ninth bishop of Episcopal Diocese of Central Pennsylvania.

Episcopal Church (USA) titles
Preceded by Henry Damerel Aves	2nd Missionary Bishop of Mexico; 1926 - 1930	Succeeded by Efrain Salinas y Velasco
Preceded by Herman Page	6th Bishop of Michigan; 1940 - 1948	Succeeded by Richard S. M. Emrich
