= Julio César Martín-Trejo =

Mexican Anglican bishop (born 1964)

The Right Reverend Julio César Martín-Trejo D.D.
- Bishop in the Anglican Church of Mexico
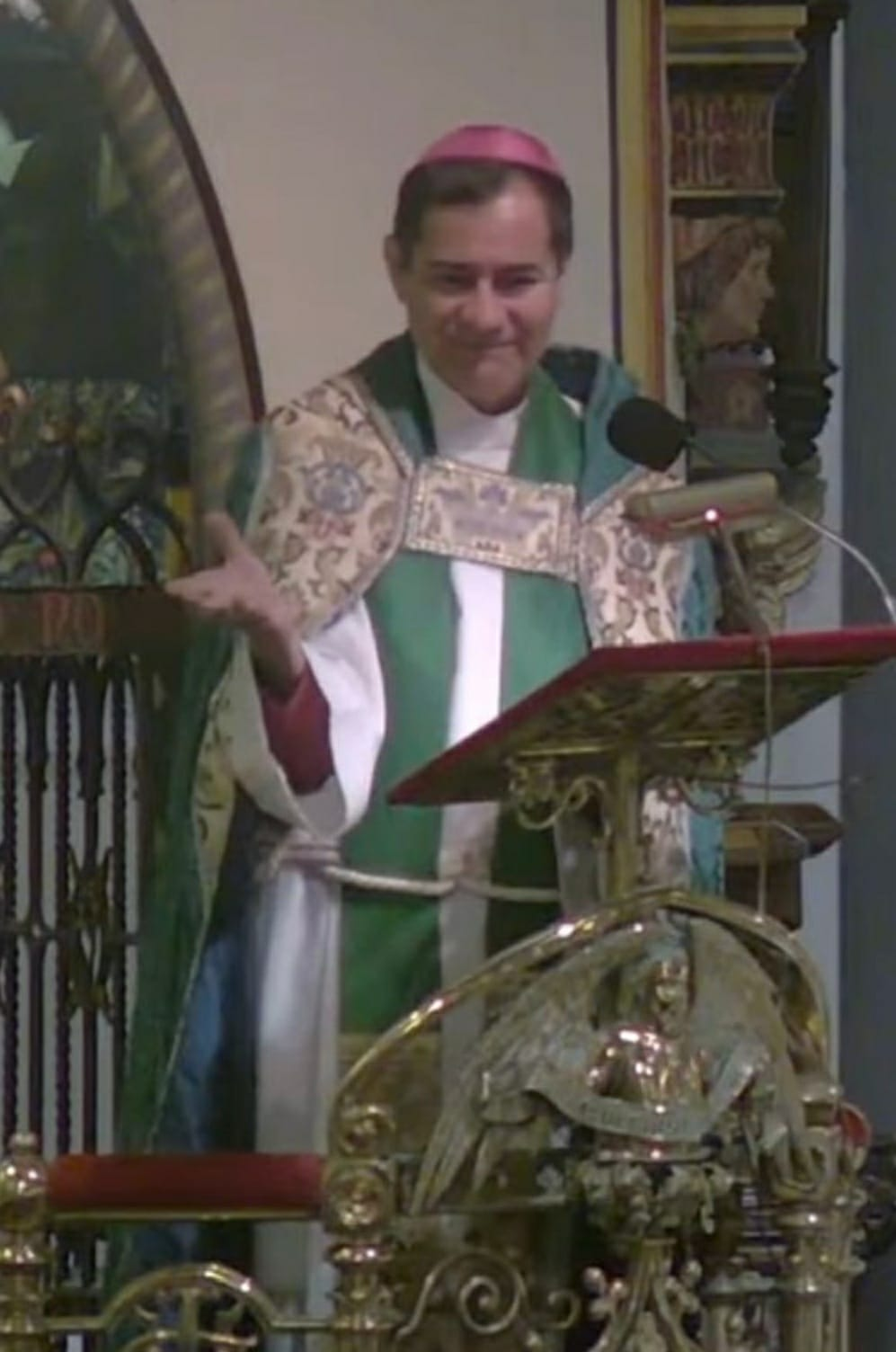
- Bishop Martin in 2023
- Diocese: Anglican Diocese of the Southeast
- In office: 2020–present

Orders
- Ordination: 1990 deacon; 1992 priest by Anglican Bishop of Cuernavaca José G. Saucedo
- Consecration: September 21, 2019 by Anglican Primate of Mexico Francisco Manuel Moreno, Anglican Suffragan Bishop of Europe David Hamid, Anglican Bishop of Madrid Carlos López-Lozano

Personal details
- Born: 11 October 1964 (age 62) Cozumel, San Miguel, Q. Roo
- Denomination: Anglican
- Residence: Av. Americas 69 and 73, Xalapa, Ver.
- Spouse: Imelda Bejar
- Occupation: Theologian, Bishop
- Education: Escuela Nacional de Antropología e Historia, Huron University College, La Salle University, Atlantic School of Theology.

Julio César Martín Trejo (born Cozumel, Q. Roo, October 11, 1964) is a Mexican Anglican bishop in Southern Mexico. He has been identified as a strong pro-LGBTQ advocate since 2020.

== Support of LGBTQ civil rights ==
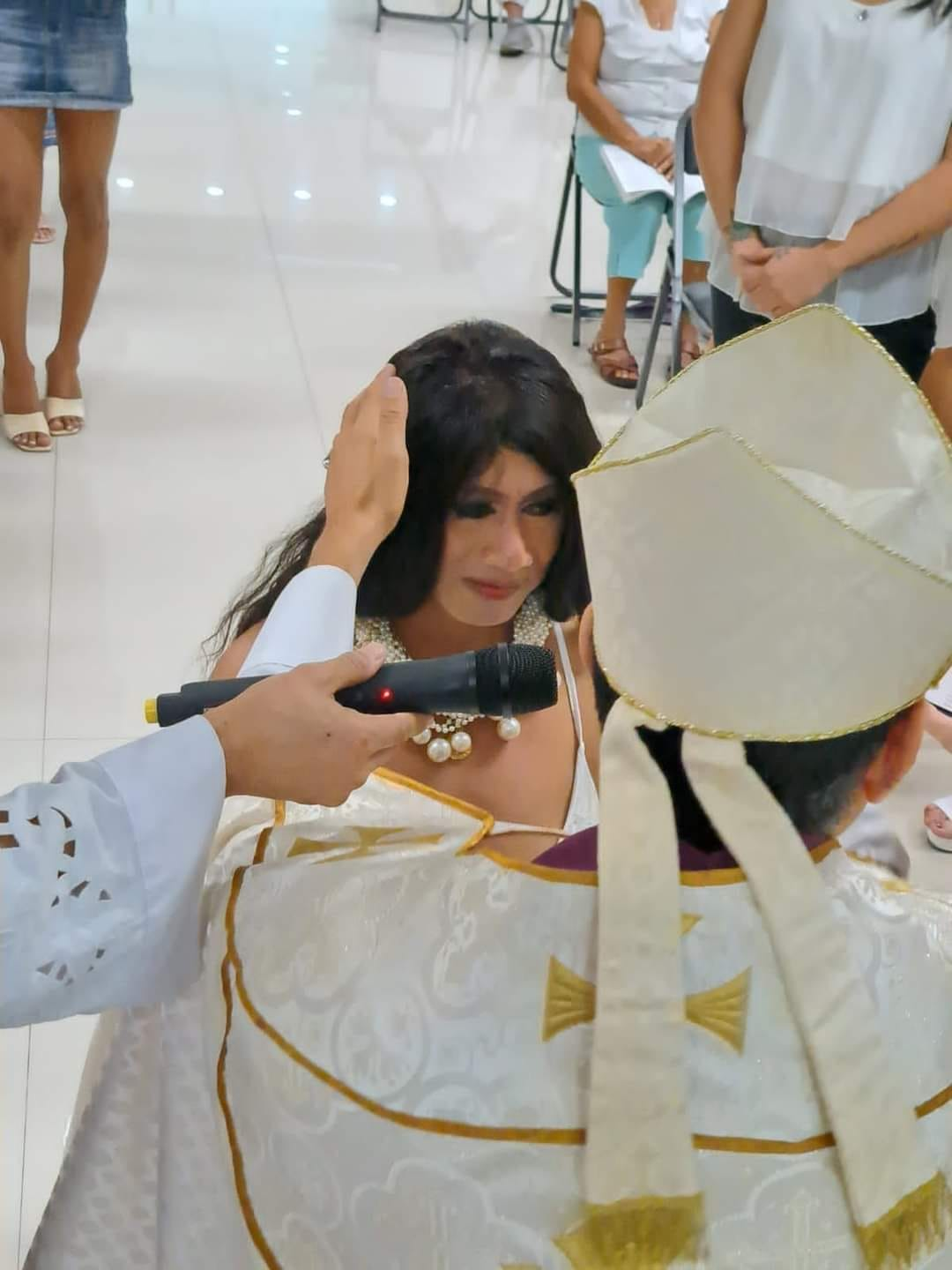
Bishop Martin confirming a trans woman in 2022

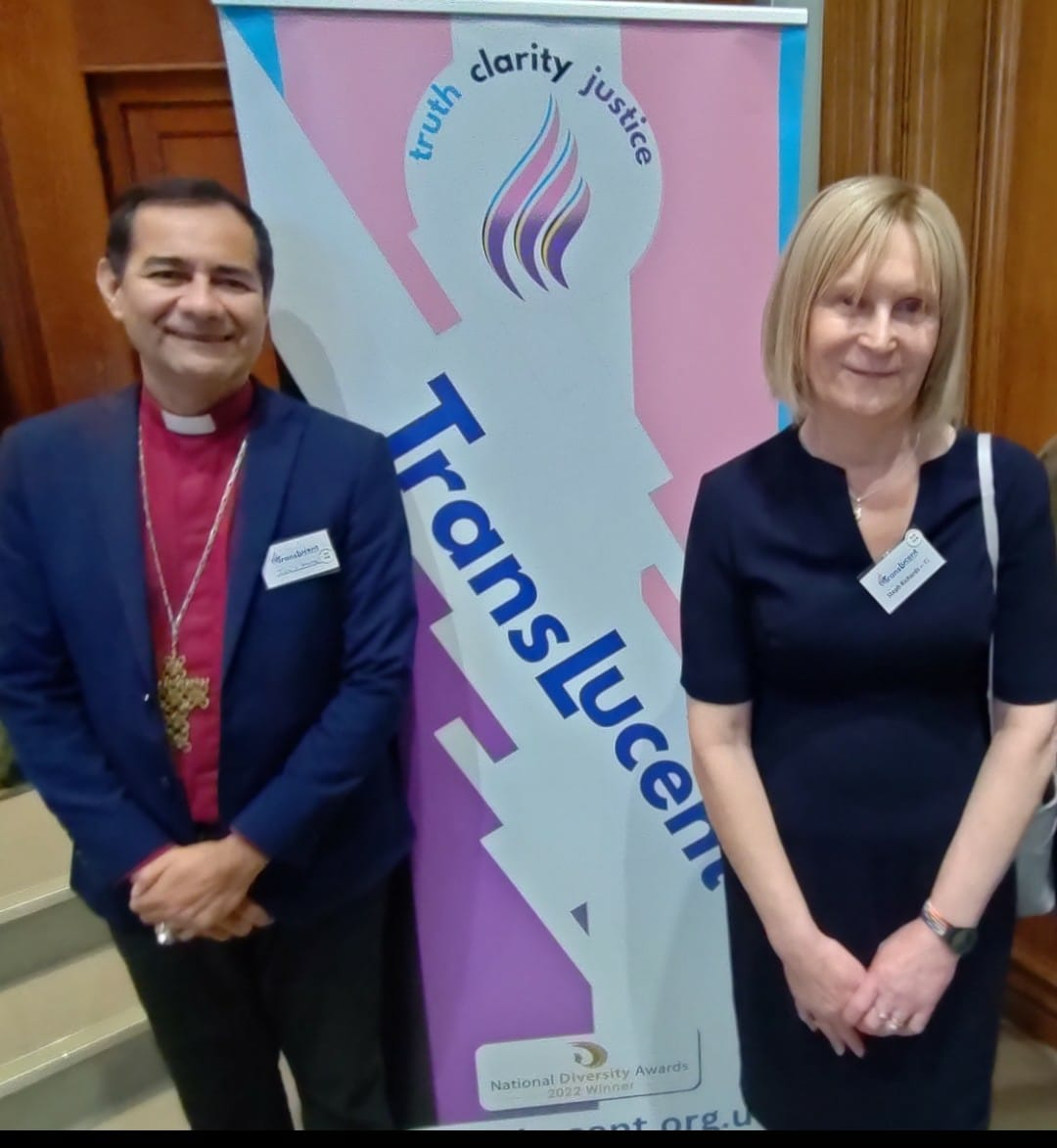
Bishop Martin at the TransLucent Conference for Trans rights, London, UK.

He has been the diocesan bishop of the Anglican Diocese of Southeastern Mexico, in the Anglican Church of Mexico, since March 2020. Initially he intended to lead his diocese into inculturating the Gospel through translating the Anglican liturgy to the indigenous pre-columbian languages within his diocese but the social dynamics related to LGBTQ topics in his diocese led him to ministering to the sexual diversity community. Now he is one of only two bishops of mainline historical churches (the other being Roman Catholic bishop José Raúl Vera López) who have fully, openly and publicly supported civil rights for the LGBT community in Mexico by participating in gay pride celebrations leading delegations of local Anglican priests and laity, and calling civil authorities to follow through the Supreme Court resolution declaring all laws discriminating against LGBT people unconstitutional Bishop Martin has expressly asked the state governments to respect the Federal Supreme Court's ruling and legalise gay civil marriage. His diocese also spoke out against hate crimes against LGBT people and others. Bishop Martin has also proposed a draft version for the blessing of same-gender couples, though the policy is in discussion and not yet approved. He has openly called to all Anglican churches to approve gay ecclesiastical marriage by expanding the sacrament of Holy Matrimony to gay people. Other clergy in Bishop Martin's diocese support LGBTQ inclusion in the church. In February 2022 under his leadership the synod of his diocese by a 66% margin in a secret vote approved a motion to change the marriage canon to allow gay marriage in the church.

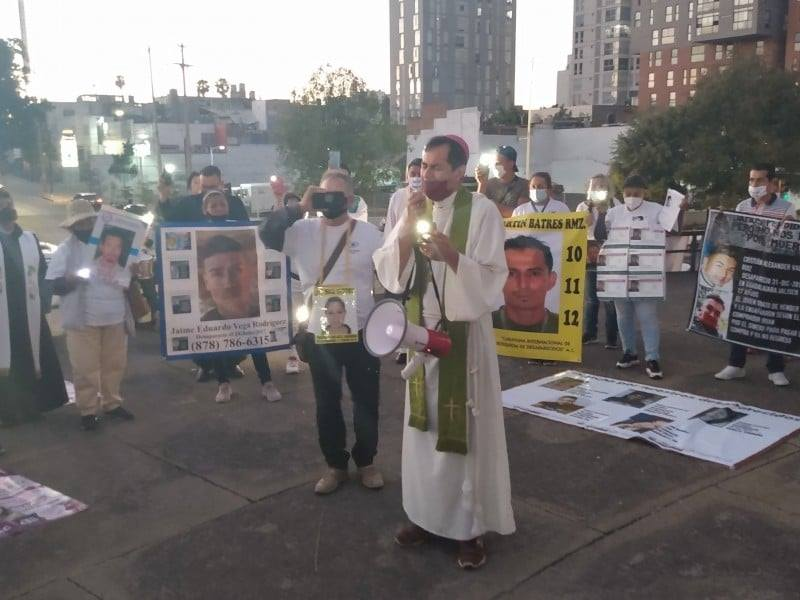
Anglican bishop Julio C. Martin marching in solidarity with families of missing people, Guadalajara, Jalisco.

He has taken part in public demonstrations in support of families of kidnapped and missing persons, has commemorated the students massacred in Plaza de las Tres Culturas in Mexico City in 1968, and has given spiritual support to sexual workers in downtown Mexico City. He is also a supporter of the long standing Mexican policy of separation of church and state entrenched in the Mexican constitution expressed in a public education free of any religious doctrines or church intervention.

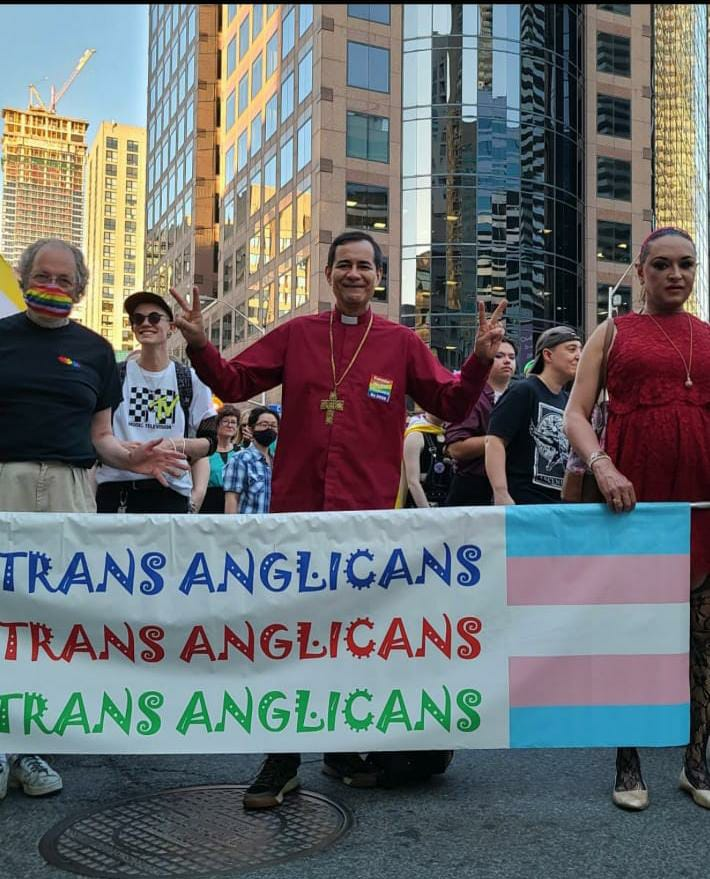
Bishop Julio C. Martin at the Trans Pride, Toronto

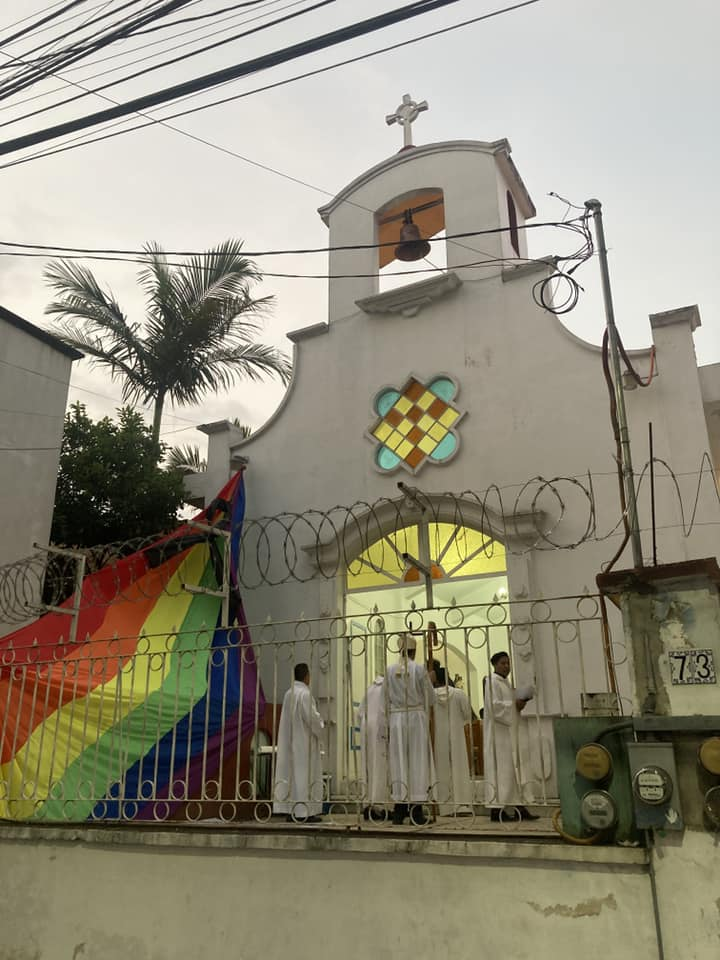
Anglican cathedral, Xalapa.

In 2022, at the Lambeth Conference, Bishop Martin was one of twelve bishops who prepared a pro-LGBTQ statement affirming the holiness of love of all committed same-gender couples, being the only bishop of Mexico and only Spanish-Speaking bishop who signed the said statement. In 2023 he was awarded an honoris causa doctoral degree in Canada for his pro LGBTQ+ leadership.

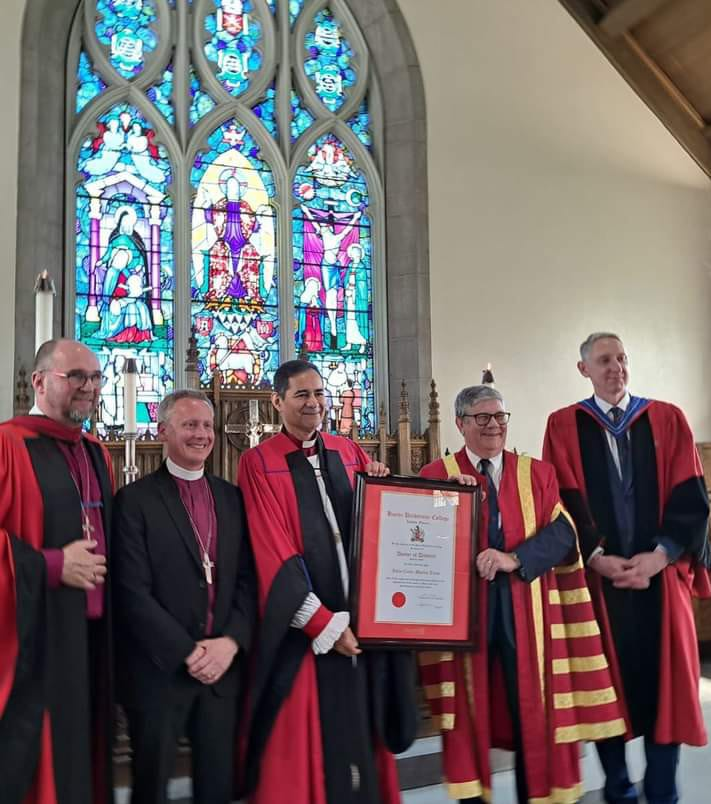
Anglican Bishop Julio C. Martin (next to bishop Kevin Robertson) receiving a Doctor in Divinity for his pro LGBTQ leadership by Huron University College

He as well supports women in ministry and expressed his joy at the designation of the first woman Archbishop of Canterbury

== Education ==
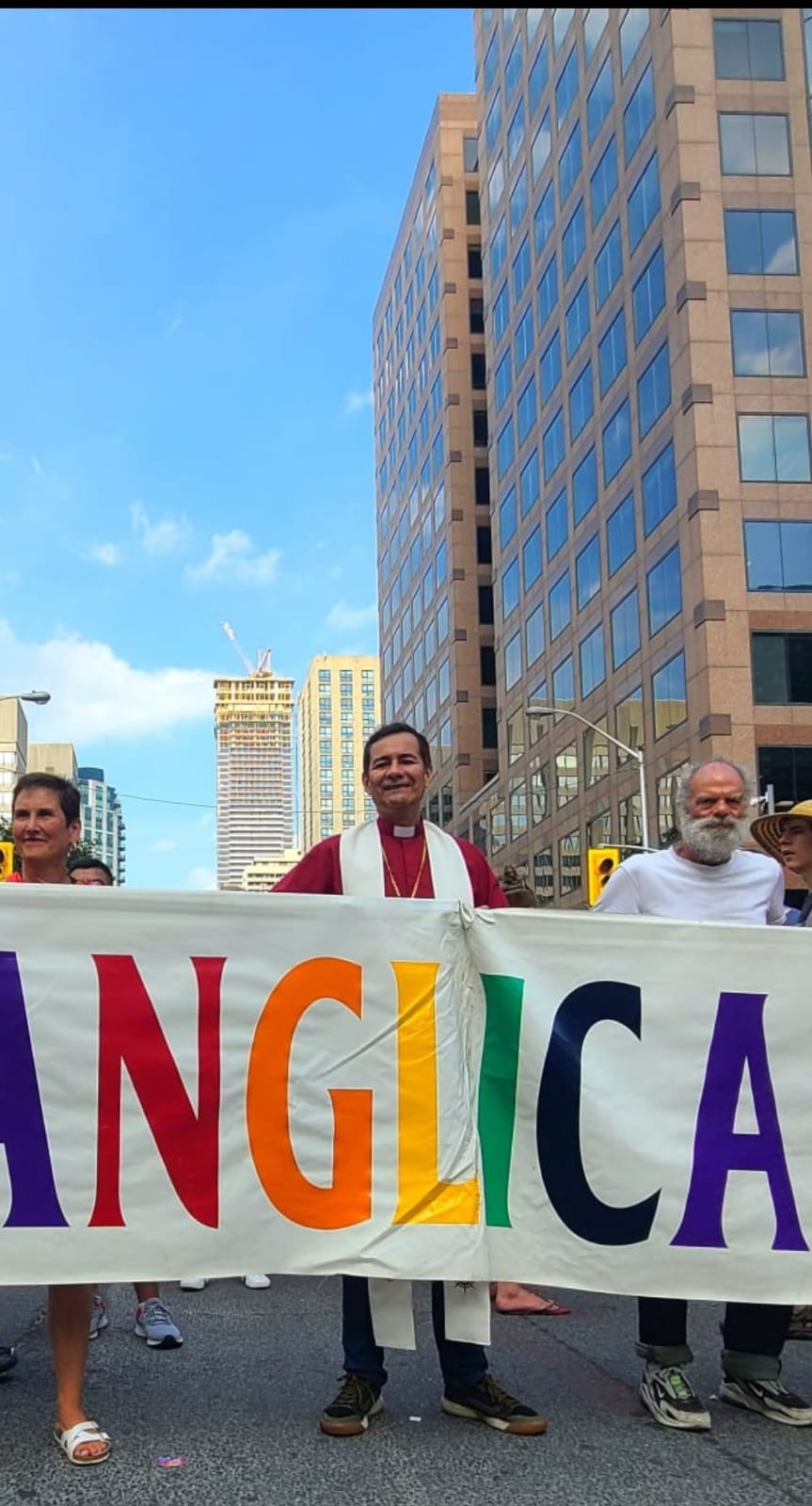
Bishop Martin at the 2022 Toronto Gay Pride

Although Martín was born on Cozumel Island into the larger families of politicians of Lebanese Maronite origins (Martín, Borge, Joaquín), he was raised as an atheist, yet after studies in archaeology at the National School of Anthropology and History in Mexico City, he pursued Anglican theological studies first in Mexico City and then at Anglican Huron University College, at the University of Western Ontario, London, Ontario, and later at La Salle University. From 1997 to 1998 he conducted research at Episcopal Divinity School, in Cambridge, Mass., for a book on Richard Hooker's 16th-century Anglican theology. As part of continuing education, he is one of the few priests (only fifteen each year) who have been invited to Windsor Castle, for the special clergy courses offered by St George's House (Windsor Castle), for which he researched on episcopal leadership roles. He is enrolled in an M. A. in Theology and Religious Studies at Atlantic School of Theology, Halifax, Nova Scotia. Martín is proficient in Western European languages and is the author of many published articles about politics and social issues. On May 11, 2023 the University of Western Ontario through its founding college, Huron University College, conferred bishop Martin a Doctor in Divinity honoris causa for his advocacy in favour of the LGBTQ+ in the church. He is married and has one child.

== Ministry ==
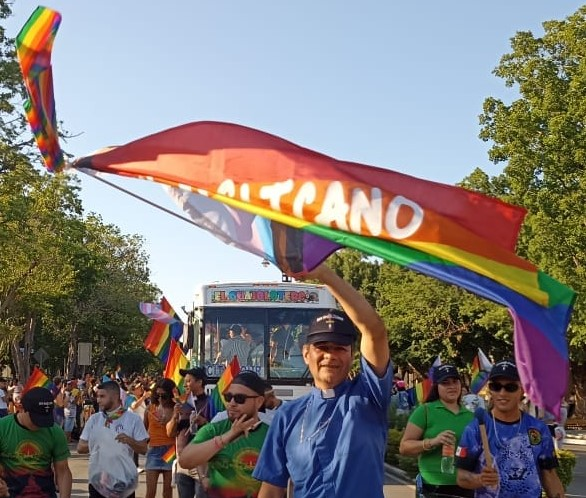
Bishop Julio César Martin at a LGBTQ march in Mérida, Mexico.

Ordained deacon in 1991, Martin served briefly in Prescott, Ontario, and then in Taxco, Mexico, from 1992 to 1997. By 1999 he was teacher at San Andrew's seminary in Mexico City, youth chaplain, editor of the diocesan magazine, and representative of the church to government agencies. He was dean of the Anglican Cathedral in Mexico City (2001–2010) where he was chaplain to grass roots organizations supporting sex workers, before a ten year period of parish ministry in heritage historical site St. Mary & St. George Anglican Church in Jasper, Alberta, and in North Sydney, Nova Scotia. Elected bishop coadjutor in March 2019 for the Diocese of the Southeast in the Anglican Church of Mexico, he was consecrated on September 21 same year by the bishop of Northern Mexico, the bishop of the Spanish Reformed Episcopal Church, and the suffragan bishop for Europe of the Church of England. The participation of these bishops means that the episcopal lines of apostolic succession from the Old Catholic Church of Utrecht, the (Anglican) Church of Ireland, and the Church of England have entered the Mexican episcopate derived from the Scottish episcopal lineage. Martín was declared diocesan bishop on March 10, 2020.

== Consecrators ==
- The Most Reverend Francisco Moreno, Primate of the Anglican Church of Mexico
- The Right Reverend David Hamid, Suffragan Bishop for Europe (Church of England)
- The Right Reverend Carlos Lopez-Lozano (Bishop of Spain; Spanish Reformed Episcopal Church)
