= Selway (surname) =

Selway is a surname. Notable people with the surname include:

- Andy Selway (born 1970), KMFDM drummer
- Anthony Selway (1909–1984), British Royal Air Force officer
- Bradley Selway (1955–2005), Judge of the Federal Court of Australia
- George Selway (1924–1994), British actor with a lengthy career in film and television
- George R. Selway (1905-1989), Bishop of the Episcopal Diocese of Northern Michigan from 1964 to 1972
- Mary Selway (1936–2004), British casting director
- Phil Selway (born 1967), English musician and songwriter - drummer and backing vocalist of Radiohead
