= William Dimmick =

William Dimmick may refer to:

- William A. Dimmick, American Episcopal bishop
- William Harrison Dimmick, member of the U.S. House of Representatives from Pennsylvania
