= Diocese of Mexico =

Diocese of Mexico (or of Mexico City) may refer to:

- the Anglican Church of Mexico Diocese of Mexico (Episcopal Church (USA), 1860–1995; IAM, 1995–present)
- the Roman Catholic Archdiocese of Mexico (Diocese of Mexico, 1530–1546)
