= Selway =

Selway may refer to:

- Selway (surname)
- Selway National Forest, established in Idaho in 1911 from parts of Clearwater National Forest and Nez Perce National Forest
- Selway River, in North Central Idaho in the north-western United States within the Selway-Bitterroot Wilderness

== See also ==
- Selway-Bitterroot Wilderness, protected wilderness area in the states of Idaho and Montana, in the United States
