= Diocese of Marquette =

Diocese of Marquette may refer to:

- Roman Catholic Diocese of Marquette
- Episcopal Diocese of Marquette
