= Efrain Salinas y Velasco =

Mexican bishop (1886 - 1968)

- Bishop of Mexico
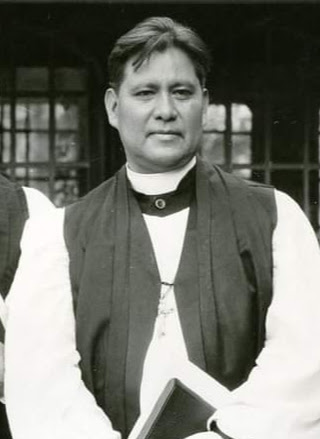
- Church: Episcopal Church (United States)
- See: Episcopal Diocese of Mexico
- Predecessor: Frank W. Creighton
- Successor: José G. Saucedo

Orders
- Consecration: September 29, 1931

Personal details
- Born: January 20, 1886 Cuernavaca, Mexico
- Died: December 15, 1968 (aged 82)

Efrain Salinas y Velasco (Cuernavaca, 20 January 1886 - 15 December 1968) was a Mexican Anglican/Episcopalian bishop.

He was the Bishop of Mexico in the Episcopal Church from 1934 to 1957. He served as suffragan bishop from 1931 to 1934.
