= Chapter (religion) =

Body of clergy in various Christian churches

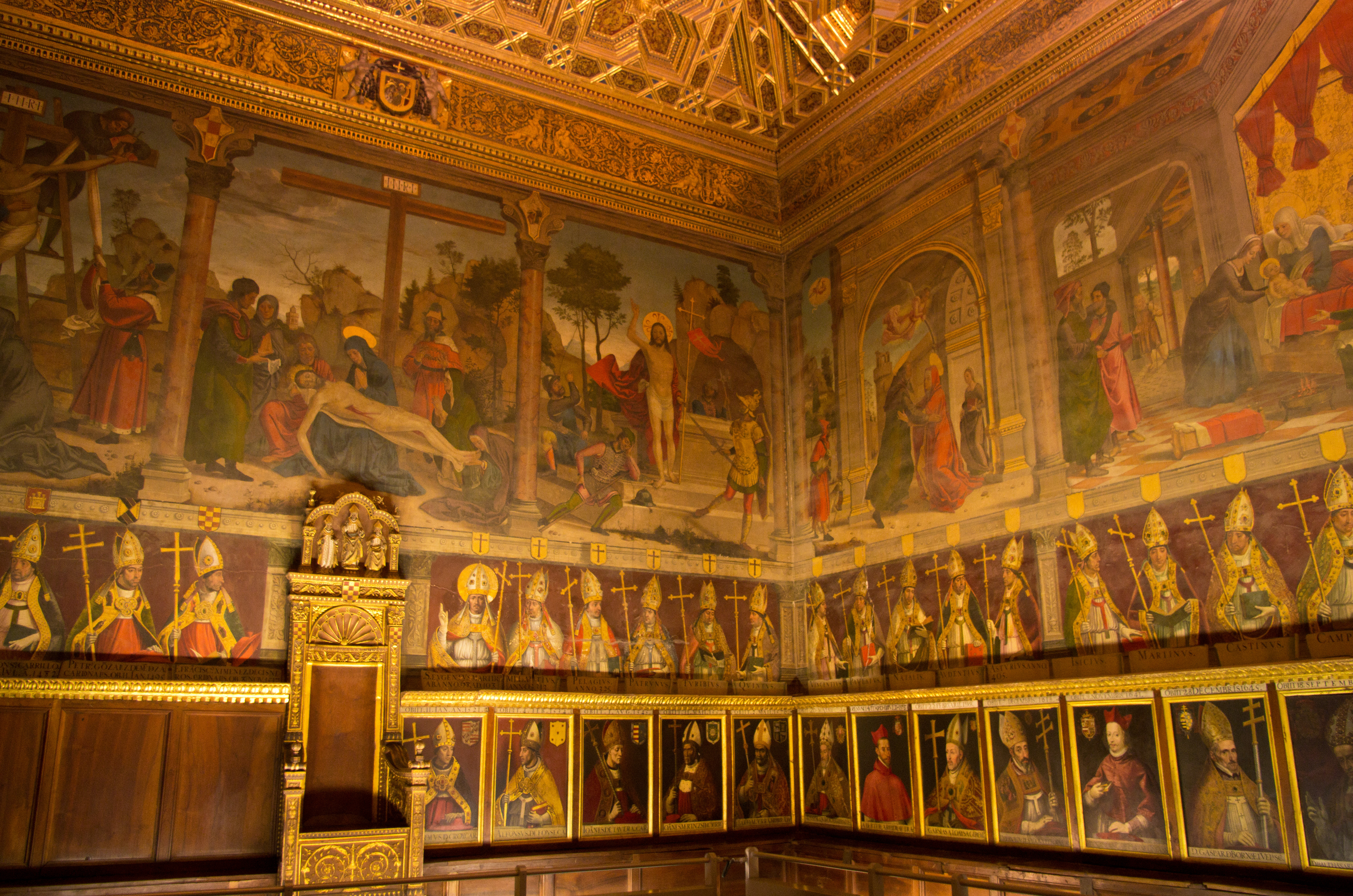
The chapter house of the Cathedral of Toledo.

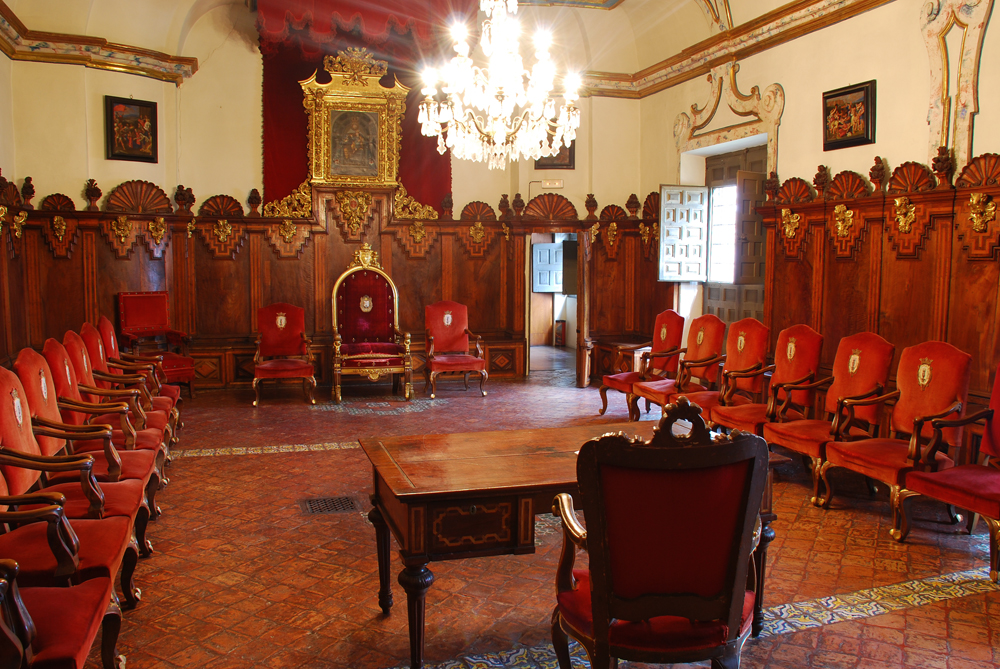
The chapter room of the Cathedral of Pamplona.

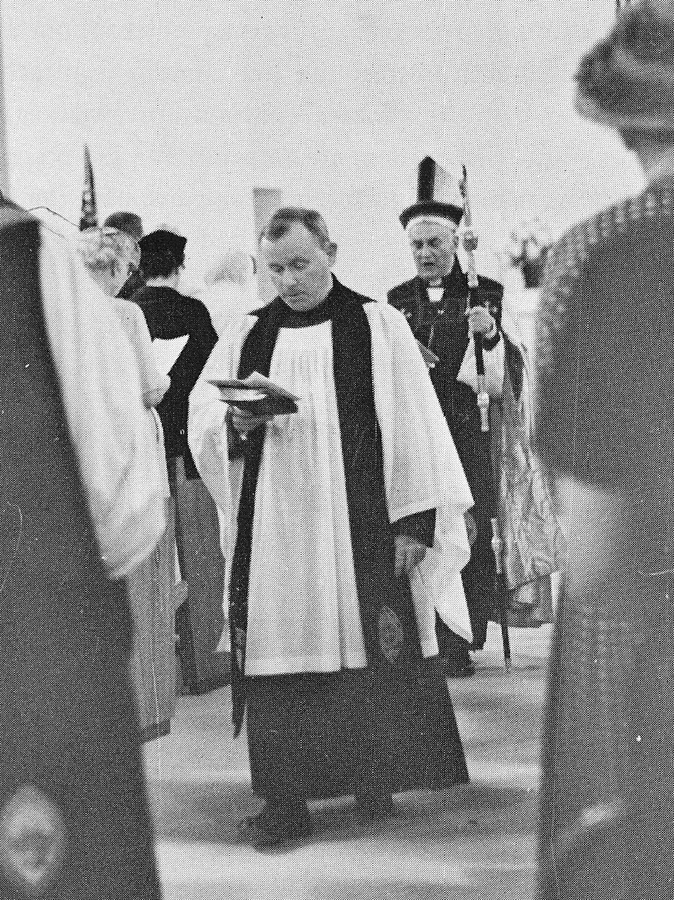
Dean William Dimmick and other canons of St Mary's Cathedral in Memphis, Tennessee, in 1960.

A chapter (Latin: capitulum or capitellum) is one of several bodies of clergy in Catholic, Old Catholic, Anglican, and Nordic Lutheran churches or their gatherings.

== Name ==
The name derives from the habit of convening monks, friars or canons for the reading of a chapter of the Bible or a heading of the order's rule. The 6th-century St Benedict directed that his monks begin their daily assemblies with such readings, and over time expressions such as "coming together for the chapter" (convenire ad capitulum) found their meaning transferred from the text to the meeting itself and then to the body gathering for it. The place of such meetings similarly became known as the "chapter house" or "room".

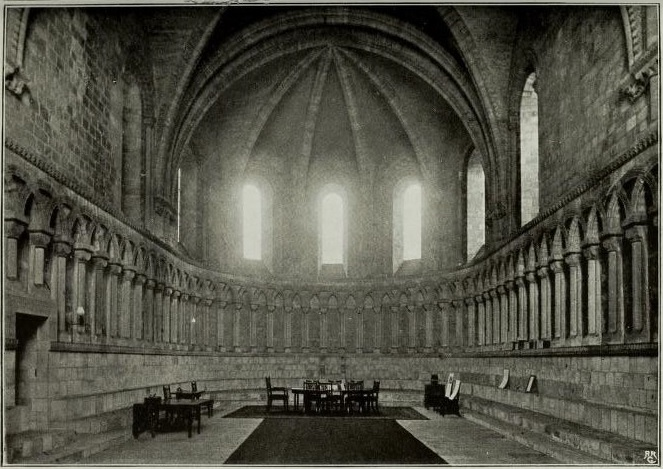
The chapter house at Durham Cathedral.

== Cathedral chapter ==
A cathedral chapter is the body ("college") of advisors assisting the bishop of a diocese at the cathedral church. These were a development of the presbyteries (presbyteria) made up of the priests and other church officials of cathedral cities in the early church. In the Catholic Church, they are now only established by papal decree.

In the event of an episcopal vacancy, cathedral chapters are sometimes charged with election of the bishop's replacement and with the government of the diocese. They are made up of canon priests. "Numbered" chapters are made up of a fixed number of prebendaries, while "unnumbered" chapters vary in number according to the direction of the bishop. The chapters were originally led by the cathedral's archdeacon but, since the 11th century, have been directed by a dean or provost.

In the Catholic Church, the chapter appoints its own treasurer, secretary, and sacristan and – since the Council of Trent – canon theologian and canon penitentiary. The same council approved of other local offices, which might include precentors, chamberlains (camerarii), almoners (eleemosynarii), hospitalarii, portarii, primicerii, or custodes. Canons are sometimes given the functions of punctator and hebdomadarius as well. In the Church of England, the chapter includes lay members, a chancellor who oversees its educational functions, and a precentor who oversees its musical services. Some Church of England cathedrals have "lesser" and "greater" chapters with separate functions.

In the US Episcopal Church, the chapter is a meeting of those with the responsibilities of a vestry for a cathedral church.

== Collegiate chapter ==
A collegiate chapter is a similar body of canons who oversee a collegiate church other than a cathedral.

== General chapter ==
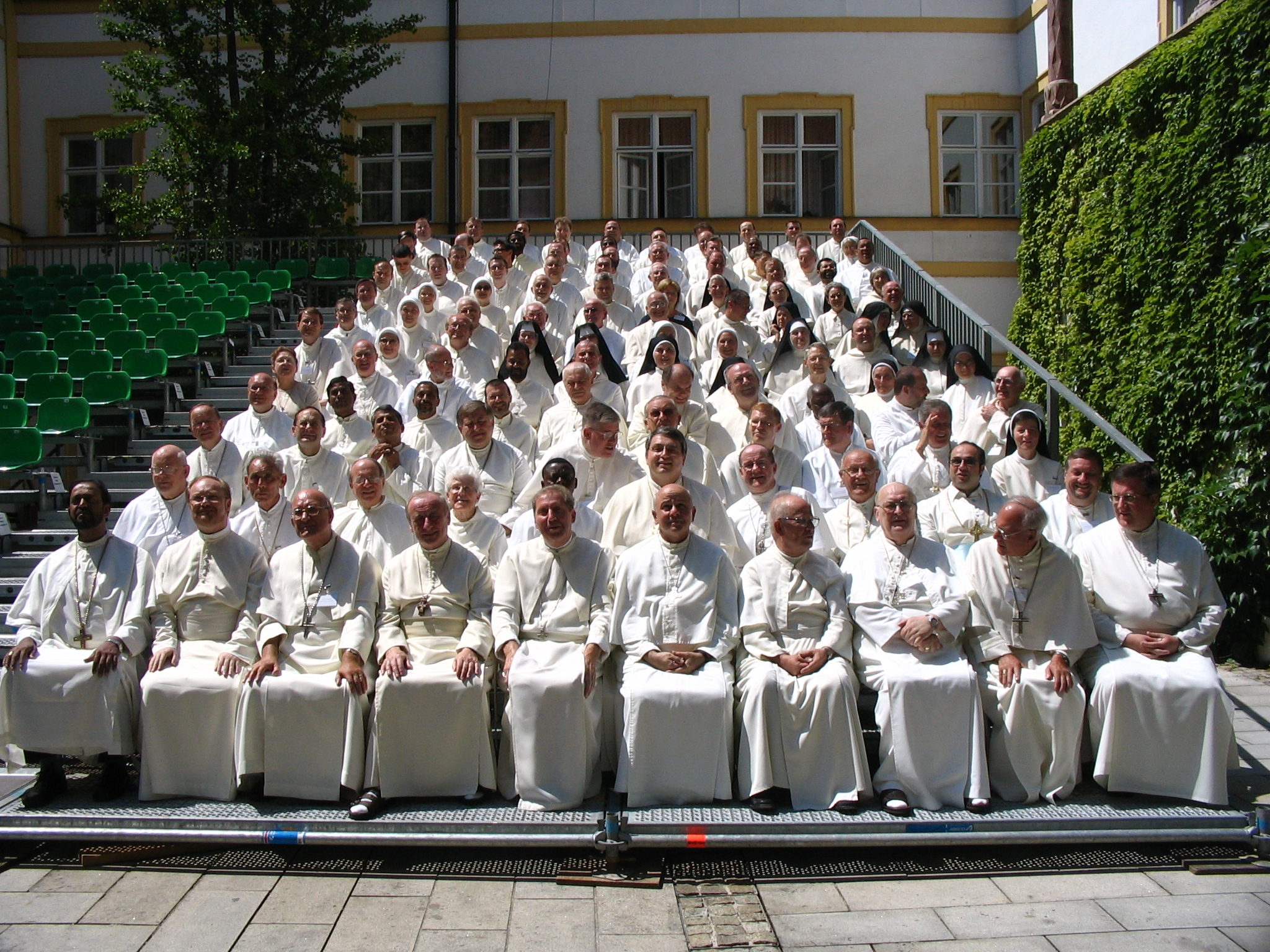
A group photo at the 2006 general chapter of the Premonstratensians.

A general chapter is a general assembly of monks, typically composed of representatives from all the monasteries of an order or congregation. The equivalent meetings of provincial representatives of Franciscan orders is called a Chapter of Mats.

Catholic orders of nuns or sisters also often hold general chapters: periodic governing assemblies of the order, which vary in geographic scope from congregants within a city to an international gathering. These are considered "a graced, holy time" and often involve long preparation of prayer and study to discuss future directions of the order. General chapters are also a time to elect officers and leadership (e.g., a Mother superior). Pope Paul VI observed in 1964 that general chapters "primarily have relevance to [individual] Orders and Congregations", but "also influence the life of the Church; for the Church, to a great extent, derives Her vigor, Her apostolic zeal, and Her fervor in seeking holiness of life, from the flourishing condition of Her Religious Institutes".

After the Second Vatican Council, the Catholic Church delegated "especially to general chapters" the consideration of how each religious order was to implement the general aims of adaptation and renewal which were set out in the Council's Decree on the Adaptation and Renewal of Religious Life (Perfectae caritatis).

Many orders of nuns or sisters have regular internal gatherings known as some form of chapter, which differs from "general chapters" – in some cases, these are called simply a chapter. These are times for pragmatic, collective discussions about issues relevant to their communal lives (e.g., among the nuns or sisters of a convent).

== Chapter of faults ==
A chapter of faults is a gathering for public correction of infractions against community rules and for self-criticism separate from standard confession. Some orders of nuns have a resonant practice of sharing their "faults," which differ from the confession of sins. For example, cloistered, contemplative Dominican nuns in the U.S. use what they call a regular chapter for this purpose, during which the prioress invites members to accuse themselves of individual faults that go against community good. Participants may stand up and say, "Sisters, I accuse myself of (such and such a fault)." This exercise in humility is followed by the women prostrating themselves (known as the venia) and the prioress assigning a penance. The regular chapter is a demarcated event: "What has been spoken of at Chapter is never spoken of outside of the it."

== Orders of knighthood ==
The assembled body of knights of a military or knightly order was also referred as a "chapter".
