= Kevin Thew Forrester =

Kevin Genpo Thew Forrester, also known as Kevin Thew Forrester, is an Episcopal priest since 1994. He has served as Ministry Development Coordinator, as well as serving for Rector/Ministry Developer of St. Paul’s Church in Marquette, Michigan, and St. John’s Church in nearby Negaunee since 2007. Thew Forrester served as bishop-elect of the Episcopal Diocese of Northern Michigan from February through July 2009. Thew Forrester received the title Genpo in 2004.

In February 2009, Thew Forrester was elected as Bishop of the Episcopal Diocese of Northern Michigan by a special convention of the diocese. In the Episcopal Church, confirmation of a bishop's election requires the consent of a majority of Episcopal Church bishops and diocesan standing committees. On July 27, 2009, the Episcopal Church of the United States announced that Thew Forrester's election had failed to achieve this consent from a majority of the 110 diocesan standing committees, in which a majority of them rejecting the election. A press account stated that this was the first time in 77 years, since 1932, that the election of an Episcopal Church Bishop was nullified. The last candidate rejected on strictly theological grounds was James DeKoven in 1875 for his ritualist practices.

== Published works ==
I Have Called You Friends: An Invitation to Ministry (Church Publishing, 2003)
