= Hayward S. Ablewhite =

American bishop (1887–1964)

The Right Reverend Hayward Seller Ablewhite D.D.
- Bishop of Northern Michigan
- Hayward Ablewhite
- Church: Episcopal Church
- Diocese: Northern Michigan
- Elected: December 17, 1929
- In office: 1930–1939
- Predecessor: Robert L. Harris
- Successor: Herman Page Sr.

Orders
- Ordination: 1916 by Boyd Vincent
- Consecration: March 25, 1930 by Hugh L. Burleson

Personal details
- Born: September 11, 1887 Cleveland, Ohio, United States
- Died: July 1, 1964 (aged 76)
- Denomination: Anglican
- Parents: James B. Ablewhite & Annie Seller
- Spouse: Inez Fillmore (m. 1915)
- Education: Kenyon College

Hayward Seller Ablewhite (September 11, 1887 – July 1964) was an American bishop. He was the bishop of the Episcopal Diocese of Marquette, now the Episcopal Diocese of Northern Michigan, serving from 1929 to 1939. He was convicted of embezzlement and served nine months in prison in 1939.

== Early life and education ==
Ablewhite was born on September 11, 1887, in Cleveland, Ohio, the son of James B. Ablewhite and Annie Seller. He was educated at University School in Cleveland, before studying at Kenyon College from where he graduated with a Bachelor of Arts. He also enrolled at Bexley Hall, the divinity school of Kenyon College, and earned his Bachelor of Divinity in 1915. He was awarded a Doctor of Divinity in 1930. Ablewhite married Inez Fillmore on June 17, 1915.

== Ordained ministry ==
Ablewhite was ordained deacon in 1915 by Bishop William Andrew Leonard of Ohio, and priest in 1916 by Bishop Boyd Vincent of Southern Ohio. He served as curate at the Church of the Advent in Cincinnati, Ohio, between 1915 and 1917, and then rector of the Church of the Good Shepherd in Columbus, Ohio, between 1917 and 1919. In 1919, he became rector of St James' Church in Piqua, Ohio, while in 1926, he became rector of St Philip's Church in St. Louis. In 1928, he was chosen to be the Dean of St Paul's Cathedral in Marquette, Michigan.

== Bishop ==
During a special diocesan convention held in Grace Church, Ishpeming, Michigan, on December 17, 1929, Ablewhite was elected Bishop of Marquette on the second ballot. He was consecrated on March 25, 1930, in St Paul's Cathedral by Bishop Hugh L. Burleson of South Dakota. On June 2, 1937, the diocese changed its name to Northern Michigan, hence Ablewhite became the first bishop to be styled as the Bishop of Northern Michigan.

== Embezzlement and imprisonment ==
On March 23, 1939, Ablewhite resigned his bishopric after $99,000 shortage was recorded in the accounts of the Diocese of Northern Michigan. He was indicted with defalcation and embezzlement in October 1939 and was sentenced with a sentence of one to ten years in prison. He was released after serving nine months in state prison in Jackson, Michigan.
