= Rayford Ray =

American bishop (born 1956)

The Right Reverend Rayford Jeffrey Ray
- Bishop of Northern Michigan
- Church: Episcopal Church
- Diocese: Northern Michigan
- Elected: December 4, 2010
- In office: 2011–present
- Predecessor: Jim Kelsey

Orders
- Ordination: April 1, 1987 by Gerald N. McAllister
- Consecration: May 21, 2011 by Katharine Jefferts Schori

Personal details
- Born: August 30, 1956 (age 70) Heidelberg, West Germany
- Denomination: Anglican
- Spouse: Suzanne Ray
- Children: 3
- Education: University of Michigan

Rayford Jeffrey Ray (born August 30, 1956) is the eleventh and current bishop of the Episcopal Diocese of Northern Michigan.

== Biography ==
Ray was born on August 30, 1956, in Heidelberg, West Germany. He became a US citizen when he turned 18. He graduated with a Bachelor of Arts in history and language from Cameron University. He then became a middle school geography, social studies and American history teacher, before attending Nashotah House for theological studies. He graduated in 1986.

Ray was ordained deacon on June 21, 1986, and priest on April 1, 1987. He served congregations in Oklahoma until 1990, when he moved to Northern Michigan. He married Suzanne Ray, who is also a priest.

On December 4, 2010, he was elected Bishop of Northern Michigan, after over three years of vacancy in the episcopal seat of the diocese. He was consecrated on May 21, 2011.

== See also ==
- List of Episcopal bishops of the United States
- Historical list of the Episcopal bishops of the United States
