= Thomas K. Ray =

The Right Reverend Thomas Kreider Ray D.D.
- Bishop of Northern Michigan
- Church: Episcopal Church
- Diocese: Northern Michigan
- Elected: February 6, 1982
- In office: 1982–1999
- Predecessor: William A. Dimmick
- Successor: Jim Kelsey

Orders
- Ordination: December 23, 1959 by Francis Lickfield
- Consecration: August 21, 1982 by John Allin

Personal details
- Born: May 24, 1934 Barberton, Ohio, United States
- Died: February 6, 2018 (aged 83) Michigan, United States
- Denomination: Anglican
- Spouse: Brenda Lee Ackerman (m. 1959)
- Children: 4
- Education: University of Michigan

Thomas Kreider "Tom" Ray (May 24, 1934 - February 6, 2018) was the ninth bishop of the Episcopal Diocese of Northern Michigan.

== Early life and education ==
Ray was born on May 24, 1934, in Barberton, Ohio. He studied at the University of Michigan, where he met his future wife Brenda Lee Ackerman; they married in 1959. He also attended the General Theological Seminary, and graduated in 1959. He was awarded an honorary Doctor of Divinity from the General Theological Seminary in 1984.

== Ordained ministry and bishop ==
Ray was ordained deacon on June 20, 1959, by Bishop Benjamin M. Washburn and priest on December 23, 1959, by Bishop Francis Lickfield. He served as canon at St Mark's Cathedral in Grand Rapids, Michigan, Crown Point, Indiana, and Gethsemane Church in Marion, Indiana. In 1971 he became rector of St Luke's Church in Evanston, Illinois. Ray was elected Bishop of Northern Michigan on the second ballot on February 6, 1982, during a special diocesan convention. He was consecrated on August 21, 1982. He was an advocate of women's rights, gay rights, and Mutual Ministry. He retired in 1999. Ray died on February 6, 2018, at the age of 83, three days after his wife's death.
