= Anglican Church of Mexico =

Anglican province in Mexico

- Iglesia Anglicana de México
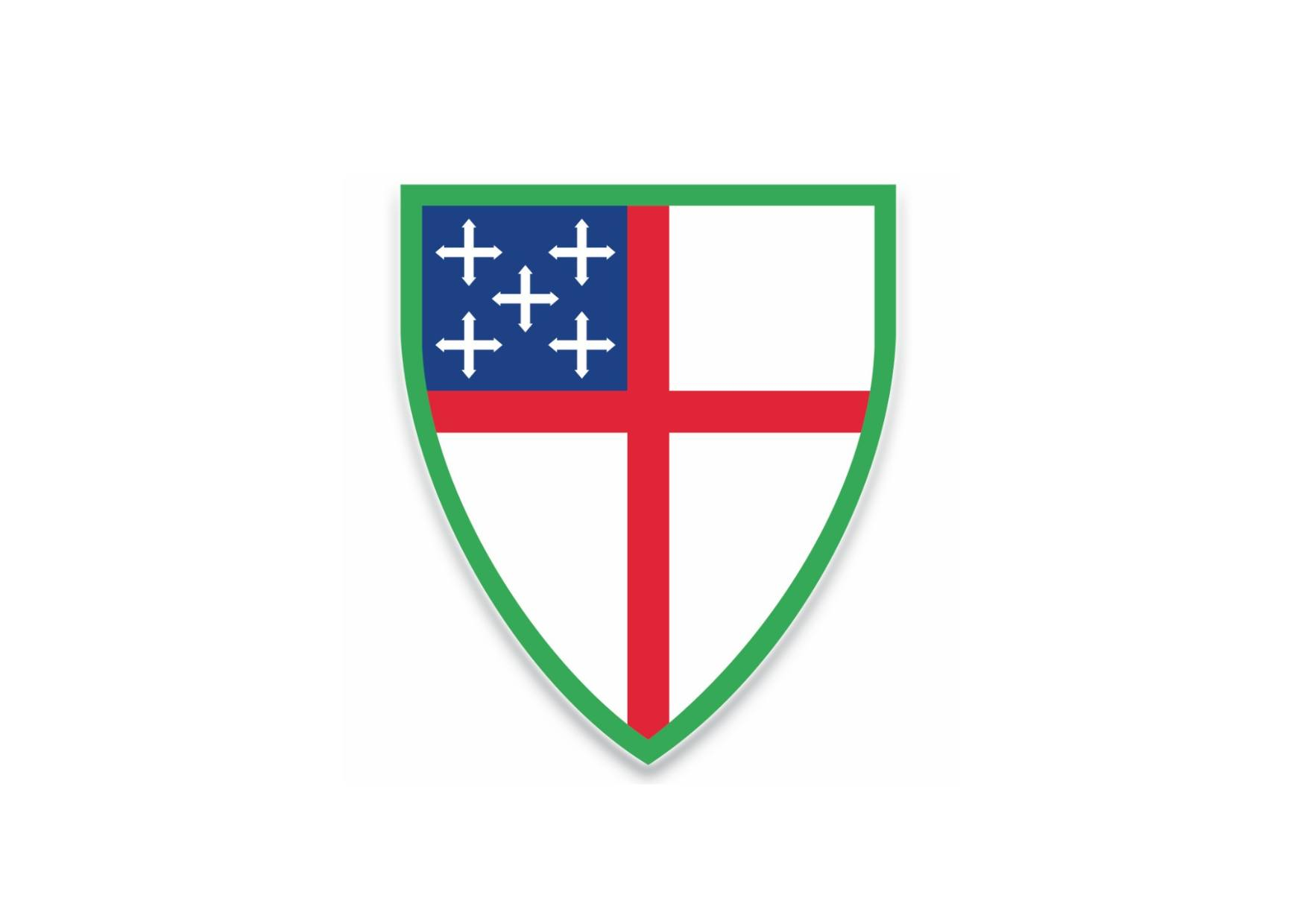
- Abbreviation: IAM
- Classification: Protestant
- Orientation: Anglican
- Scripture: Holy Bible
- Theology: Anglican doctrine
- Polity: Episcopal
- Primate: Alba Sally Sue Hernández García (Note: Hernández's status as archbishop of Mexico is disputed within the church, but she is recognized as primate and archbishop by the Anglican Communion Office.)
- Associations: Anglican Communion
- Territory: Mexico
- Members: 21,000-100,000

The Anglican Church of Mexico (Spanish: Iglesia Anglicana de México, abbreviated IAM), originally known as the Church of Jesus (Spanish: Iglesia de Jesús) is the Anglican province in Mexico and includes five dioceses. Although Mexican in origin and not the result of any foreign missionary effort, the Church uses the colors representing Mexico as well as those of the United States-based Episcopal Church in its heraldic insignia or shield, recognizing a historical connection with that US church which began with obtaining the apostolic succession.

== History ==
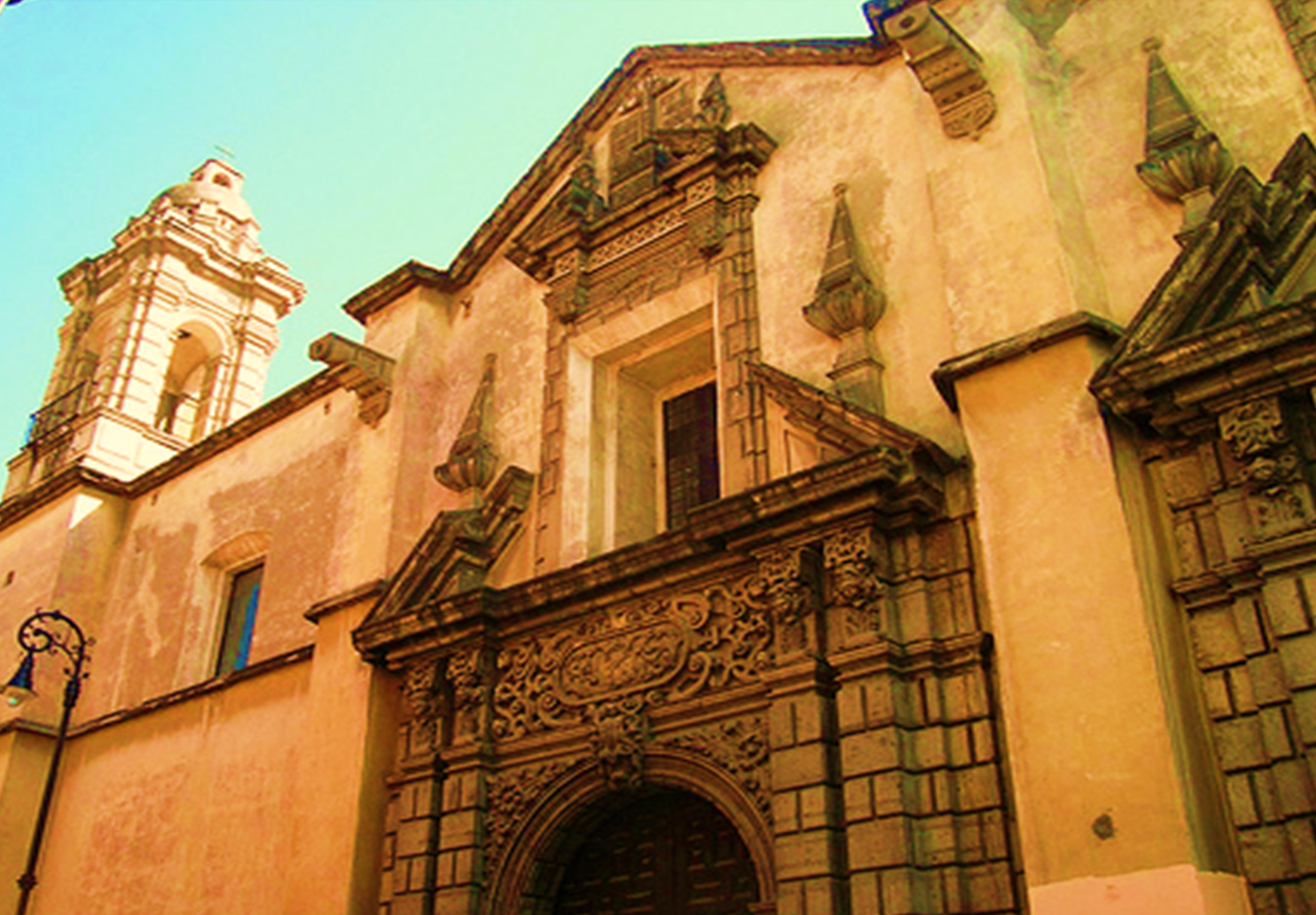
The 17th-century former Convento San José de Gracia now serves as the Anglican Cathedral of Mexico

The Anglican Church of Mexico can trace its roots to the Mexican War for independence in 1810, and to the attempt in 1854 by several liberal minded priests who later supported the liberal Constitution of 1857 (for this reason they became known as “Constitutionalist Fathers”) to reform the local Catholic Church, but it was the Reform War that led to the foundation of the church. Religious reforms in 1857 secured freedom of religion, separating the Catholic Church from government and politics. In 1860, the newly formed Church of Jesus contacted the Protestant Episcopal Church in the United States of America, seeking apostolic succession. In 1879, the first bishop, H. Chauncey Riley, was consecrated. In 1958, the fourth missionary bishop of Mexico José G. Saucedo was the first of the church's bishops to be consecrated on Mexican soil, being the de facto leader of the Mexican church for the second half of the 20th century leading the process for it to become an autonomous province of the Anglican Communion on 1 January 1995, and being elected its first primate archbishop. The church has experienced an internal schism beginning in 2022,and continuing into 2026

=== Controversy over primacy ===
Controversy in the church erupted after an April 2022 diocesan election to replace retired primate Francisco Manuel Moreno as bishop of northern Mexico. Five clergy said they were prevented from participating in the election, which resulted in Oscar Pulido becoming bishop-elect amid claims of interference in the election. Shortly thereafter, competing delegations from the Diocese of Northern Mexico presented themselves for admission to the church's national synod in June 2022, one led by Pulido and another led by Moreno. As acting primate since 2020, Enrique Treviño Cruz recognized the Pulido-led delegation, and Treviño was during the synod elected and formally installed as primate. He afterward consecrated Pulido as bishop of northern Mexico.

The controversy resulted in division among the leaders of the Anglican Church of Mexico. Bishop of Southeastern Mexico Julio César Martín-Trejo and Bishop of Western Mexico Ricardo Gomez Osnaya sided with Moreno, while Bishop of Mexico Alba Sally Sue Hernandez sided with Treviño and Pulido. Martín and Gomez claimed the election of Treviño as primate was invalid. They also challenged the addition of Pulido and Hernandez to the Anglican Church of Mexico's board during a meeting they were excluded from, alleging procedural irregularities in the process. Treviño alleged irregularities and "actions contrary to canon law" by Martín and Gomez.

In the fall of 2023, Martín, Gomez and Moreno constituted a board claiming to be the Anglican Church of Mexico's legal governing board. In doing so, they voted to strip Treviño of his primacy and install Francisco Moreno as acting primate. According to news reports, "the dissenting bishops retain control of the financial accounts of the Diocese of the North and the Province of Mexico." However, according to Linda Nicholls, regional Anglican primate for the Americas, the Anglican Communion Office would continue to recognize Treviño as primate.

In March 2026, an extraordinary general synod of the church claiming to represent all five dioceses elected Hernandez as archbishop, succeeding Treviño. She was recognized as primate by the Anglican Communion Office and was invited to attend the installation service for Sarah Mullally as Archbishop of Canterbury on March 25, 2026, during which Hernández read the Gospel lesson. Martín and Gomez did not attend the synod and did not recognize Hernandez as archbishop, and they formed a different website for the Iglesia Anglicana de México that listed Gomez as primate. As of March 2026, the dispute between the two factions was the subject of litigation in Mexico.

== Membership ==
Today, there are 52 Anglican parishes in Mexico, 36 missions, and 12 other affiliated institutions. While some sources claim 100,000 baptized members, the Church of England Yearbook, which includes information on other Anglican provinces, and a study published in 2016 by the Journal of Anglican Studies and Cambridge University Press, report that the church has 21,000 active baptized members. In 2017, Growth and Decline in the Anglican Communion: 1980 to the Present, published by Routledge, collected research from 2010 reporting there were 27,500 Anglicans in Mexico. In 2015, the Universidad Autónoma de Ciudad Juárez estimated there were 30,000 Anglicans in Mexico.

== Structure ==
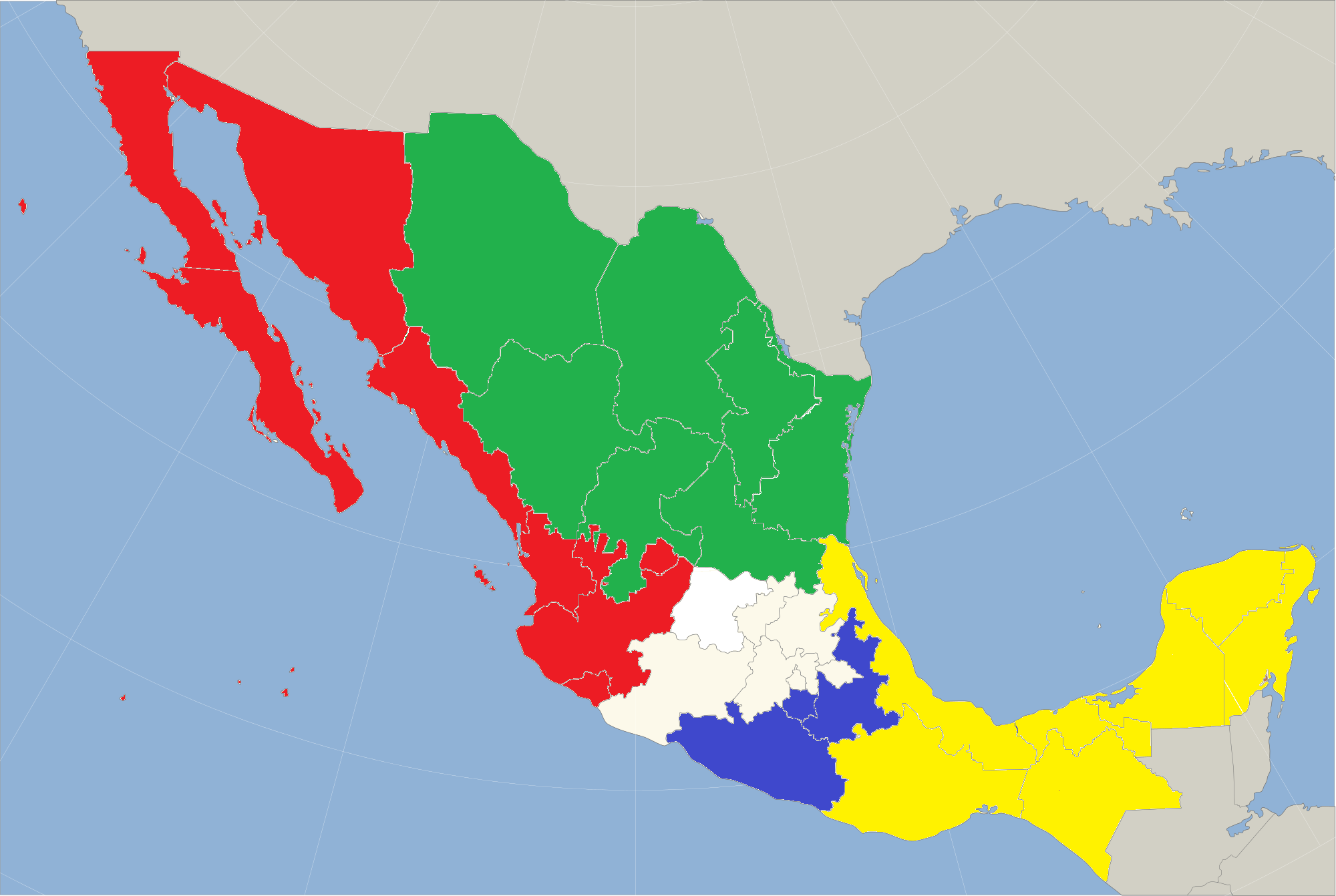
Map of dioceses of Anglican Church of Mexico (Green: Northern; Red: Western; Yellow: Southeastern; White: Mexico; Blue: Cuernavaca)

The polity of the Anglican Church of Mexico is episcopal, as is true of all other Anglican churches. The church maintains a system of geographical parishes organized into dioceses. There are 5 of these, each headed by a bishop. Each diocese is divided into archdeaconries, each headed by a senior priest. The archdeaconries are further subdivided into parishes, headed by a parish priest. Several of the dioceses are named in Spanish merely for a compass direction — del Occidente, del Norte, del Sureste — which translate directly as "of the West" &c. However, the Episcopal Church and other English-language Anglican Communion sources instead render these names with "Mexico" — e.g. "of Western Mexico" — so these are the forms used on the English-language Wikipedia.

=== Diocese of Mexico ===
In 1879, diocesan bishop Henry C. Riley was ordained and consecrated by the Episcopal Church in the United States of America as "Bishop of the Valley of Mexico", to exercise oversight over the Mexican "Church of Jesus". Riley resigned in 1884 and the care of the independent church lapsed to the Presiding Bishop of the Episcopal Church. Henry Forrester, the church's local administrator, was elected Bishop of the Valley of Mexico, but died before consecration.

In 1904, the Episcopal Church formed all of the Mexican Republic into one Missionary District of Mexico, for North American Anglicans/Episcopalians in Mexico; and which the native Church of Jesus joined in 1906. That year, Henry D. Aves was consecrated first Missionary Bishop of Mexico and resigned in 1923. In 1926, Frank W. Creighton succeeded him as second missionary bishop. In 1972, the Episcopal Church divided the missionary district in three, creating those of Northern and of Western Mexico, and renaming the remaining portion as Central & Southern Mexico; on 1 January 1980, all three were erected into dioceses. In 1988/9 the Central and Southern diocese was again split in three, creating the Cuernavaca and Southeastern dioceses, the remainder being named, again, the Diocese of Mexico (City). The diocese today is based in Mexico City, where its cathedral is St Joseph of Grace.

Missionary bishops of the Missionary Diocese of Mexico

- 1879-1884: I Diocesan Bishop Henry C. Riley, Bishop of the Valley of Mexico.
- 1884-????: The Presiding Bishop, Provisional Bishop.
- ????-1904: Henry Forrester, Bishop-elect.
- 1904-1923: II Diocesan Bishop Henry D. Aves (first missionary bishop)
- 1926-1933: III Diocesan Bishop Frank W. Creighton, Bishop of Michigan.
- 1931-1934: Suffragan Bishop Efrain Salinas y Velasco.
- 1934-1957: IV Diocesan Bishop Efrain Salinas y Velasco.
- 1958-1972: V Diocesan Bishop José G. Saucedo (IV missionary Bishop; continued as Diocesan Bishop of the new Diocese of Central & Southern Mexico)
- 1964-1972: Suffragan Bishop Leonardo Romero, (I Diocesan Bishop of the new Diocese of Northern Mexico)
- 1964-1972: Suffragan Bishop Melchor Saucedo, (I diocesan bishop the new Diocese of Western Mexico)
- 1972-1980: V Diocesan Bishop José G. Saucedo (Last missionary bishop continued as Diocesan Bishop of the now renamed Diocese of Central & Southern Mexico )

Bishops of the Diocese of Central & Southern Mexico (former Missionary Diocese of Mexico)

- 1973-1989: V Diocesan Bishop José G. Saucedo (I Diocesan Bishop of the new Diocese of Cuernavaca)
- 1980-1982: Suffragan Bishop Roberto Martinez-Resendiz (in Nopala, Hidalgo) (resigned)
- 1980-1989: Suffragan bishop Claro Huerta Ramos (in Arroyo Zacate, Veracruz; became I Diocesan Bishop of the new Diocese of Southeastern Mexico)
- 1985-1997: Suffragan Bishop Martiniano García Montiel.

Bishops of the Diocese of Mexico (former Diocese of Central & Southern Mexico)

- 1989-2003: VI Diocesan Bishop Sergio Carranza Gomez (Resigned to become auxiliary Bishop of L.A., Cal., USA)
- 1990-2018: Auxiliary Bishop Roberto Martinez-Resendiz
- 2002-2020: VII Diocesan Bishop Carlos Touché Porter (Due to retire at the latest on April 6, 2020, his jurisdiction was terminated by action of the Primate on August 6, 2020).
- 2022–present: VIII Diocesan Bishop Alba Sally Sue Hernández García

=== Diocese of Northern Mexico ===
Carved out in 1972 from the missionary district of Mexico; erected a diocese in 1980. Based in Monterrey, Nuevo León; where is the Cathedral of the Holy Family.

Bishops of Northern Mexico

- 1972 – 1986 (d.): I diocesan bishop Leonardo Romero (also Bishop-in-Charge of Episcopal Diocese of El Salvador from 1984)
- 1987 – 2002 (deposed for embezzlement and fraud): II diocesan bishop German Martínez Márquez
- 2003 – 2010: III diocesan bishop Marcelino Rivera Delgado
- 2010 – November 2020: IV diocesan bishop Francisco Manuel Moreno
- November 2020 – 2024: interim diocesan bishop Francisco Manuel Moreno (disputed)
- June 2022 – present: V diocesan bishop Oscar Pulido

=== Diocese of Western Mexico ===
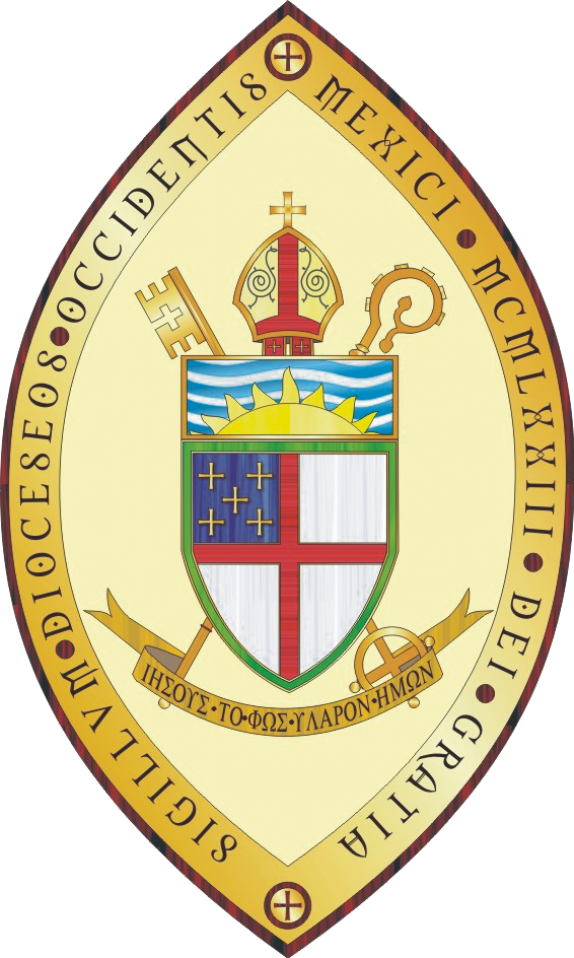
Coat of arms of the Diocese of Western Mexico

Carved out in 1972 from the missionary district of Mexico; erected a diocese in 1980. Based in Zapopan, Jalisco; cathedral of St Paul in that city.

Bishops of Western Mexico

- 1972 – 1981: I diocesan bishop Melchor Saucedo Mendoza
- 1981 – 2002 (deposed for embezzlement and fraud): II diocesan bishop Samuel Espinoza V.
- 2003 – 2018: III diocesan bishop Lino Rodríguez Amaro
- 2018 – present: IV diocesan bishop Ricardo Gómez Osnaya

=== Diocese of Cuernavaca ===
Carved out in 1989 from the Central & Southern diocese in 1988/9; Cathedral of St Michael & All Saints, Cuernavaca, Morelos.

Bishops of Cuernavaca

- 1989 – 1997: I Diocesan Bishop José G. Saucedo
- 1997 – 2002: II Diocesan Bishop Martiniano García Montiel
- 2003 – 2010 (resigned): III Diocesan Bishop Ramiro Mario Delgado Vera
- 2010 – 2013: James Ottley (Interim)
- 2013 – present: IV Diocesan Bishop Enrique Treviño Cruz (consecrated 23 February 2013)

=== Diocese of Southeastern Mexico ===
Carved out in 1989 from the Central & Southern diocese its see city is Xalapa, Veracruz. Its first congregations date back to the 1970s and are located in the Isthmus of Tehuantepec region, and are predominantly indigenous of Mixe, Mazatec, Chinantec, Zapotec, and Mixtec languages, while in Chiapas there are two Tzental Mayan-speaking congregations in the Chamula region.

Under the episcopal leadership of BishopJulio César Martín-Trejo, the Anglican Diocese of the Southeast has become a benchmark in Spanish-speaking Latin America for pastoral action in support of and service to the sexually diverse community. Since 2021, its clergy and bishop Martin have participated in various LGBTQ pride marches in the different states that make up the diocesan territory. This fact is recognized as historic by civil associations, local governments, and the media, as it has been the only church to participate in such events in the diocesan territory.

The diocese counts with civilly married gay clergy.

The Diocese of the Southeast maintains pastoral cooperation relationships with other Anglican dioceses in Canada and the United States.

In February 2022, by secret ballot, 66% of its diocesan synod voted to send a motion to the national synod of the Anglican Church of Mexico to modify the marriage canon to allow for the blessing of same-sex marriages.

- 1989 – 1999: I Diocesan Bishop Claro Huerta Ramos (Retires and later deposed on corruption charges).
- 1999 – 2020 (March 10): II Diocesan Bishop Benito Juárez Martinez

(Due to retire at the latest on June 1, 2019, his jurisdiction was terminated by action of the Primate on March 10, 2020).

- 2020 – present: III Diocesan Bishop Julio César Martín-Trejo

Bishops of Southeastern Mexico

- 1989 – 1999: I Diocesan Bishop Claro Huerta Ramos (Retires and later deposed on corruption charges).
- 1999 – 2020 (March 10): II Diocesan Bishop Benito Juárez Martinez

(Due to retire at the latest on June 1, 2019, his jurisdiction was terminated by action of the Primate on March 10, 2020).

- 2020 – present: III Diocesan Bishop Julio César Martín-Trejo

=== Primates ===
As of 2022, a primate is elected to a six-year term which is renewable.

Primates of the Anglican Church of Mexico

- 1995 – 1997: José G. Saucedo (Cuernavaca)
- 1997: Claro Huerta (Southeastern; Acting Primate)
- 1999 – 2002: (deposed for embezzlement and fraud ): Samuel Espinoza (Western)
- 2002 – 2004: Martiniano Garcia Montiel (Cuernavaca; Acting Primate)
- 2004 – 2014: Carlos Touché Porter (Mexico)
- 2014 – 2020: Francisco Manuel Moreno (Northern Mexico)
- 2022 – 2026: Enrique Treviño Cruz (Cuernavaca; Acting Primate, 2020–2022) (disputed)
- 2023 – 2024 (his death): Francisco Manuel Moreno (Northern Mexico; Acting Primate) (disputed)
- 2026 – present: Alba Sally Sue Hernández García (Mexico) (disputed)

== Doctrine and practice ==
The center of the Anglican Church of Mexico's teaching is the life and resurrection of Jesus Christ. The basic teachings of the church, or catechism, includes:

- Jesus Christ is fully human and fully God. He died and was resurrected from the dead.
- Jesus provides the way of eternal life for those who believe.
- The Old and New Testaments of the Bible were written by people "under the inspiration of the Holy Spirit". The Apocrypha are additional books that are used in Christian worship, but not for the formation of doctrine.
- The two great and necessary sacraments are Holy Baptism and Holy Eucharist
- Other sacramental rites are confirmation, ordination, marriage, reconciliation of a penitent, and unction.
- Belief in heaven and hell as states of being, and Jesus's return in glory.

The threefold sources of authority in Anglicanism are scripture, tradition, and reason. These three sources uphold and critique each other in a dynamic way. This balance of scripture, tradition and reason is traced to the work of Richard Hooker, a sixteenth-century apologist. In Hooker's model, scripture is the primary means of arriving at doctrine and things stated plainly in scripture are accepted as true. Issues that are ambiguous are determined by tradition, which is checked by reason.

=== Worship and liturgy ===
The Anglican Church of Mexico, being since its inception a Mexican catholic expression of Christianity, embraces three orders of ministry: deacon, priest, and bishop. A local variant of the Book of Common Prayer is used.

=== Ordination of women ===
The Anglican Church of Mexico allows women to be ordained, and women have been ordained as deacons and priests. The church allows the ordination of women to the episcopate. The first women were ordained to the priesthood in 1994 and, as of 2014, there were 17 women serving as priests in the Anglican Church of Mexico. As of 2021, 7 of the women priests served in the Diocese of Mexico. In 2020, the Anglican church in the Yucatán welcomed the first woman to be ordained to the diaconate for the region. In 2021, the Diocese of Mexico acknowledged that a woman may be elected bishop in the diocese. In November 2021, the Diocese of Mexico elected Alba Sally Sue Hernández as Bishop, making her the first woman to be elected bishop within the Anglican Church of Mexico. She was consecrated and ordained a bishop on January 29, 2022.

=== Human sexuality ===
In 2010, promoted by its primate, the general synod of the Anglican Church of Mexico prohibited same sex blessings and same sex ecclesiastical marriage.

The Anglican Church of Mexico only recognizes heterosexual marriage as the standard for marriage in the church. Upon the approval of gay civil marriage in Mexico, then Primate Francisco Manuel Moreno expressed that the official stance of the Anglican Church of Mexico will continue in spite of secular legislation.

One of the currently active bishops has openly spoken in support of same-gender marriage, Canadian-educated Julio César Martín-Trejo, bishop of the Diocese of the Southeast. At least one parish in the country has publicly expressed support for LGBTQ unions. Although unofficially, in the Diocese of Mexico, bishops have allowed clergy to be in informal same-sex relationships, while in the Diocese of Western Mexico a retired gay priest officially in a secular civil marriage has been allowed to teach at its seminary. In 2019, Bishop Ricardo Joel Gomez Osnaya licensed an openly gay and married priest for a congregation in the Diocese of Western Mexico.

In 2016, the General Synod of the church published a pronouncement declaring itself to be against all forms of violence and discrimination against migrants, victims of violence, or the LGBTI community. On December 19, 2020, three diocesan Bishops released a statement explaining that they are discussing issues related to the LGBT community and church teaching, and are working towards a common understanding.

In 2021, for the first time in the history of IAM, one of its dioceses participated in an LGBT Pride Parade: on June 19, 2021, under the leadership of its bishop, the Right Rev. Julio César Martín-Trejo, the Anglican Diocese of the Southeast joined demands for equal civil marriage and LGBT rights in the city of Xalapa, Veracruz. Bishop Martín expressly asked the secular authorities to respect the Federal Supreme Court's decision and legalise gay civil marriage. His diocese also spoke out against hate crimes against LGBT people and others. Bishop Martín has also proposed a draft version for the blessing of same-gender couples, though the policy is in discussion and not yet approved. He has openly called to all Anglican churches to approve gay ecclesiastical marriage by expanding the sacrament of Holy Matrimony to gay people. Other clergy in Bishop Martin's diocese support LGBT inclusion in the church.

In February 2022, by a two-thirds majority, the diocesan synod of the Anglican Diocese of the Southeast approved sending the tenth national synod a motion to modify the canon of marriage to allow for same-sex marriage. The X General Synod referred the proposal to allow same-sex marriage for further study which prompted Bishop Martín to pledge continued support for the full inclusion of LGBTQ Christians in the sacramental life of the church. In 2022, at the Fifteenth Lambeth Conference, Bishop Martín was the only Mexican who signed a pro-LGBTQ statement affirming the holiness of love of all committed same-sex couples.

== Ecumenical relations ==
Unlike many other Anglican churches, the Anglican Church of Mexico is not a member of the ecumenical World Council of Churches. The denomination maintains ecumenical dialogue with the Catholic Church and Orthodox churches.

The Anglican Church of Mexico considers itself to be seeking to reconcile the divide between conservative and liberal provinces in the Anglican Communion while respecting diversity of opinion and practice.
