= H. Chauncey Riley =

Anglican bishop

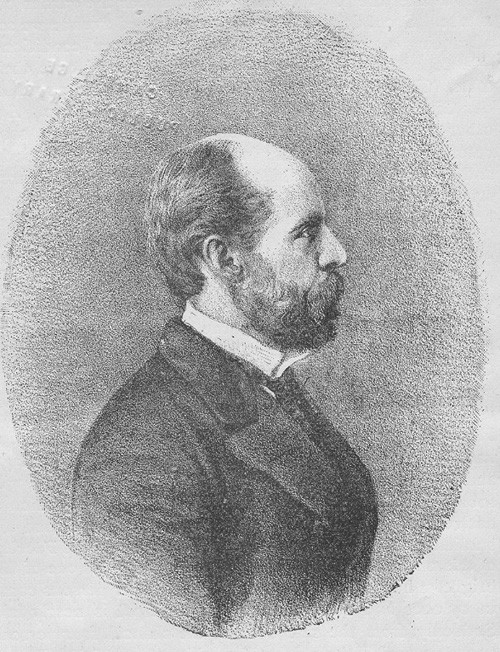

Personal details
- Born: December 15, 1835
- Died: 1904
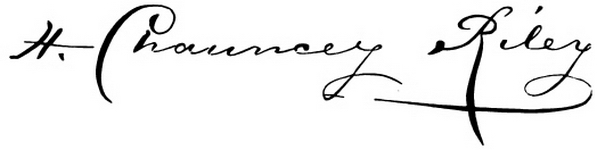
- Signature

Henry Chauncey Riley (December 15, 1835 - 1904) was first missionary bishop of what is now the Anglican Church of Mexico serving from 1879 to 1884 when he resigned his jurisdiction.
