= Samuel J. Wylie =

American bishop

The Right Reverend Samuel Joseph Wylie D.D.
- Bishop of Northern Michigan
- Church: Episcopal Church
- Diocese: Northern Michigan
- Elected: November 6, 1971
- In office: 1972–1974
- Predecessor: George R. Selway
- Successor: William A. Dimmick

Orders
- Ordination: 1952 by Charles F. Boynton
- Consecration: March 11, 1972 by John E. Hines

Personal details
- Born: November 5, 1918 New York City, United States
- Died: May 7, 1974 (aged 55) New York City, United States
- Denomination: Anglican (prev. Presbyterian)
- Parents: Samuel John Wylie & May Little
- Spouse: Beatrice Irene Browne (m. 1942)
- Children: 4

Samuel Joseph Wylie (November 5, 1918 – May 7, 1974) was the third bishop of the Episcopal Diocese of Northern Michigan, serving from 1972 to 1974.

== Early life and education ==
Wylie was born on November 5, 1918, in New York City, the son of Samuel John Wylie and May Little. He graduated from Wheaton College with a Bachelor of Science in 1938, and from the Union Theological Seminary with a Bachelor of Sacred Theology in 1942. He also earned a Master of Sacred Theology from Union Theological Seminary in 1953, and was awarded a Doctor of Divinity from the Virginia Theological Seminary, Brown University, and Huron College.

== Ordained ministry ==
Wylie was ordained as a Presbyterian minister on April 23, 1942, for the Presbytery of New York City. On August 31 of the same year he married Beatrice Irene Browne, and eventually had four children. He then served as minister at the Chelsea Presbyterian Church in New York City, before enrolling as a chaplain with the United States Navy Reserve in 1943. In 1946, he became chaplain at Columbia University, while in 1951, he became chaplain at the University of Virginia. During that time, Wylie joined the Episcopal Church and was ordained deacon on December 9, 1951, by Bishop Horace W. B. Donegan of New York, and then priest in 1952 by Bishop Charles F. Boynton, Suffragan of New York.

Wylie served as Canon of the Cathedral chapter of St John's Cathedral in Providence, Rhode Island, and chaplain at Brown University and the Rhode Island School of Design. He also served as Associate Secretary of the Division of College Work of the Executive Council for two years. In 1960, he became rector of the Church of the Advent in Boston, Massachusetts, while in 1966, he was appointed Dean of the General Theological Seminary in New York City.

== Bishop ==
Wylie was elected Bishop of Northern Michigan on November 6, 1971, and was consecrated on March 11, 1972, in Menominee, Michigan. His episcopacy was short-lived as he died in his sleep two years later on May 7, 1974, in New York City.

== Bibliography ==
- New Patterns for Christian Action
- Precede the Dawn
