= Jim Kelsey =

The Right Reverend James Arthur Kelsey D.D.
- Bishop of Northern Michigan
- Church: Episcopal Church
- Diocese: Northern Michigan
- Elected: February 6, 1999
- In office: 1999–2007
- Predecessor: Thomas K. Ray
- Successor: Rayford Jeffrey Ray

Orders
- Ordination: 1978 by Robert S. Kerr
- Consecration: July 24, 1999 by Frank Griswold

Personal details
- Born: August 28, 1952 Baltimore, Maryland, United States
- Died: June 3, 2007 (aged 54) Alger County, Michigan, United States
- Denomination: Anglican
- Parents: Arthur Corson Kelsey & Louise Martien
- Spouse: Mary Cruse (m. 1976)
- Children: 3
- Education: Ithaca College

James Arthur Kelsey (August 28, 1952 – June 3, 2007) was the tenth bishop of the Episcopal Diocese of Northern Michigan, based in Marquette.

== Biography ==
Kelsey, whose twin brother, the Reverend Stephen Kelsey, is a priest in the Episcopal Diocese of Connecticut, was born and reared in Baltimore and received degrees from Ithaca College and General Theological Seminary. He was ordained a deacon in 1977 and a priest in 1978 by Bishop Robert S. Kerr of the Diocese of Vermont. A proponent of Total Ministry, he served from 1985 to 1989 as canon missioner for cluster ministries in the Oklahoma, then served for 10 years as ministry development coordinator in Northern Michigan before being elected bishop in 1999.

He was married and had three grown children.

Kelsey was consecrated July 24, 1999, at St. Michael Roman Catholic Church, Marquette. The chief consecrator to the office of bishop was Presiding Bishop Frank Griswold. His consecrators included his predecessor as bishop of Northern Michigan, Thomas K. Ray, Edward L. Lee of Western Michigan, R. Stewart Wood of Michigan, and Edwin M. Leidel of Eastern Michigan. Kelsey was the 948th bishop in the Episcopal succession.

== Death ==
Kelsey died in a car accident while returning home from a parish visitation. Jim Kelsey's funeral service on June 9, 2007, drew more than 600 friends and colleagues in ministry. "There is no one to step in and replace Jim. It is a loss we cannot replace," said Tom Ray, who preceded Kelsey as Northern Michigan's diocesan bishop. Recounting the feeling in the room when the Standing Committee and the Core Team met one day after Kelsey died, Ray said, "this must be how the disciples felt after Jesus' crucifixion."

Episcopal Church (USA) titles
Preceded by Thomas Kreider Ray	10th Bishop of Northern Michigan; July 24, 1999 – June 3, 2007	Succeeded by Rayford Jeffrey Ray
