= Alba Sally Sue Hernandez =

Mexican Anglican bishop (born 1977)

The Most Reverend Alba Sally Sue Hernández García
- Archbishop of the Anglican Church of Mexico (Note: Hernández's status as archbishop of Mexico is disputed within the church, but she is recognized as primate and archbishop by the Anglican Communion Office.)
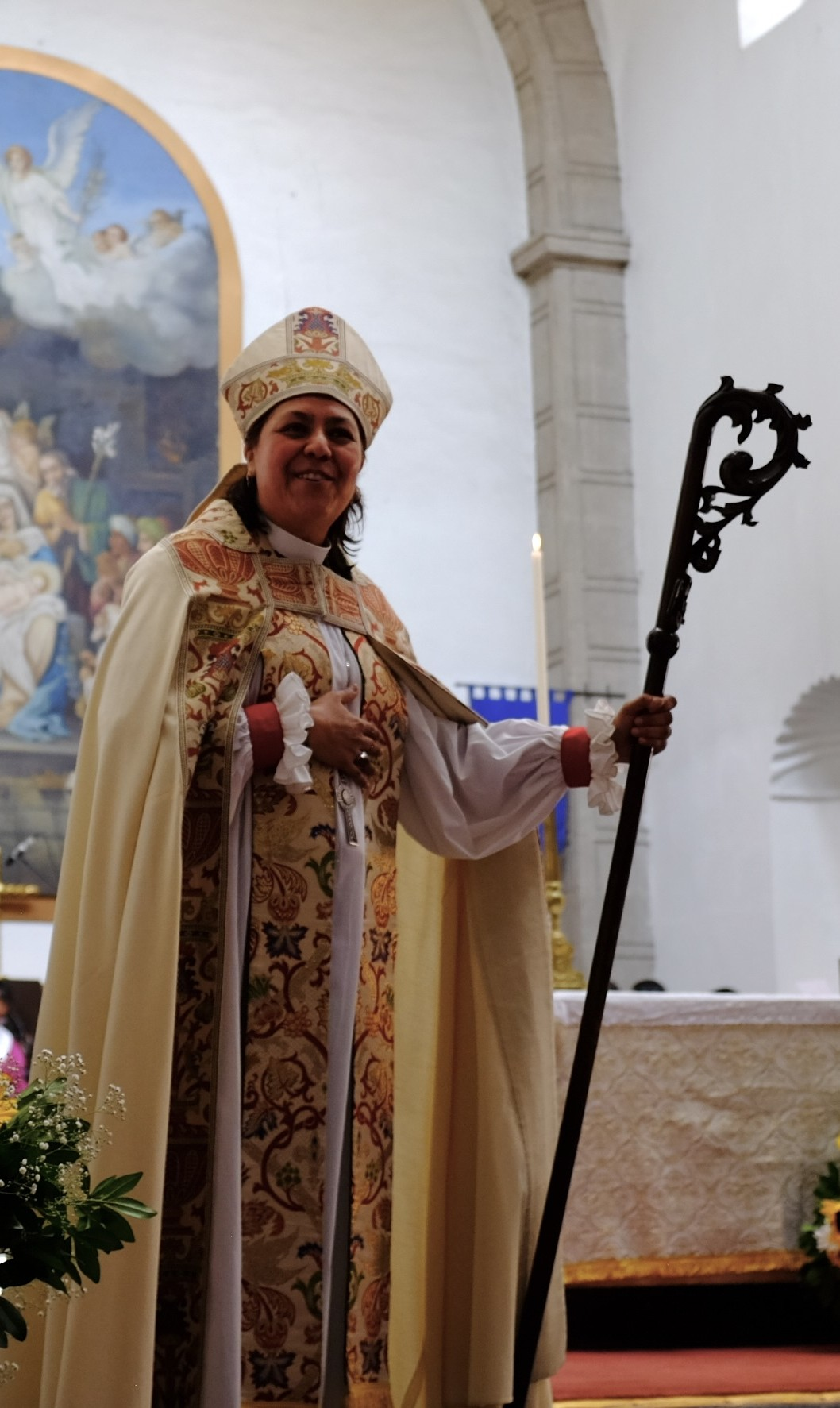
- Bishop Sally Sue Hernández
- Church: Anglican Church of Mexico
- Diocese: Mexico
- In office: 2026–present
- Predecessor: Enrique Treviño Cruz
- Other post: Bishop of Mexico (2022–present)

Orders
- Ordination: September 3, 2006 (diaconate); April 28, 2007 (priesthood)
- Consecration: January 29, 2022

Personal details
- Born: 23 June 1977 (age 49) Mexico City
- Education: Seminary of San Andrés; Ripon College

Alba Sally Sue Hernández García (born June 23, 1977) is a Mexican Anglican bishop. Since 2026, she has been primate and archbishop of the Anglican Church of Mexico, and since 2022, she has been bishop of the Diocese of Mexico. (Note: Until 1972, the Anglican Diocese of Mexico covered the entire country. With the creation of four other dioceses in 1972 and 1989, the Diocese of Mexico now covers Mexico City and the states of Guanajuato, Hidalgo, México, Michoacán, Querétaro and Tlaxcala.) She is the first woman to be elected bishop within the Anglican Church of Mexico.

== Early life and education ==
Hernández was born in 1977 in Mexico City. She was awarded a Licentiate in Theology following her studies at the Seminary of San Andrés in Mexico City and Ripon College in Oxford.

== Ordained ministry ==
She was ordained as a deacon in 2006, and as a priest in 2007. She served as pastoral officer for diocesan youth and pastoral care for women, chaplain at the Seminary of San Andrés and as dean of the Diocese of Mexico's Cathedral of San José de Gracia.

Hernández was elected bishop of Mexico in 2021 and consecrated on January 29, 2022. In January 2024, she took part in a "Growing Together" ecumenical summit that took place in Rome and Canterbury as a part of the Week for Prayer for Christian Unity. Archbishop Marinez Rosa dos Santos Bassotto the primate of the Anglican Episcopal Church of Brazil and Bishop of the Anglican Diocese of the Amazon also took part in the meeting where the two women bishops from Latin America were among 27 pairs of bishops blessed by Pope Francis and the Archbishop of Canterbury Justin Welby. She has also taken part in the Theological Commission for the Anglican Communion and represented Mexican Anglicanism on the International Anglican–Roman Catholic Commission for Unity and Mission.

In March 2026, an extraordinary general synod of the Anglican Church of Mexico elected her as archbishop to succeed Enrique Treviño Cruz. However, due to a longstanding dispute among bishops in the church stemming from a contested episcopal election in Northern Mexico in 2022, two of five diocesan bishops did not attend and did not recognize Hernández as the rightful archbishop. Hernández's election as archbishop was recognized by the Anglican Communion Office and she was invited to attend the installation service for Sarah Mullally as Archbishop of Canterbury on March 25, 2026, during which Hernández read the Gospel lesson.
