= Robert L. Harris =

American bishop (1874–1948)

The Right Reverend Robert LeRoy Harris D.D.
- Bishop of Marquette
- Church: Episcopal Church
- Diocese: Marquette
- Elected: October 6, 1917
- In office: 1919–1929
- Predecessor: G. Mott Williams
- Successor: Hayward S. Ablewhite
- Previous post: Coadjutor Bishop of Marquette (1918-1919)

Orders
- Ordination: 1900 by William Andrew Leonard
- Consecration: February 7, 1918 by Daniel S. Tuttle

Personal details
- Born: February 12, 1874 Cleveland, Ohio, United States
- Died: February 6, 1948 (aged 73) San Diego, California, United States
- Buried: San Diego
- Denomination: Anglican
- Parents: Eli Clark Harris & Susan Ann Shaw
- Spouse: Kathryn Brandon (m. 1897; died 1908) Annie Reynolds Macomber (m. 1911)
- Children: 2
- Education: Kenyon College

Robert LeRoy Harris (February 12, 1874 - February 6, 1948) was an American prelate of the Episcopal Church, who served as the second Bishop of Marquette from 1919 until 1929.

== Early life and education ==
Harris was born on February 12, 1874, in Cleveland, Ohio, the son of Eli Clark Harris and Susan Ann Shaw. He studied at Kenyon College, graduated with a Bachelor of Arts in 1896, a Master of Arts in 1911, and earned a Doctor of Divinity in 1918. He also attended Bexley Hall from where he earned a Bachelor of Divinity in 1899. Harris married Kathryn Brandon on August 25, 1897. After Kathryn's death in 1908, he married Annie Reynolds Macomber on January 2, 1911.

== Ordained ministry ==
Harries was ordained deacon in 1899 and priest in 1900 by Bishop William Andrew Leonard of Ohio. He served as rector of Calvary Church in Toledo, Ohio (1899-1901); rector of St Paul's Church in Newport, Kentucky (1901-1904); rector of Grace Church in Cincinnati, Ohio (1904–06); rector of St Mark's Church in Cheyenne, Wyoming (1906-1909); and rector of St Mark's Church in Toledo, Ohio (1909-1918).

== Bishop ==
In 1917, Harris was elected Coadjutor Bishop of Marquette, and was consecrated on February 7, 1918, by Presiding Bishop Daniel S. Tuttle. He succeeded as diocesan in October 1919, and resigned in 1929.
