= George R. Selway =

American bishop

The Right Reverend George Rhys Selway D.D.
- Bishop of Northern Michigan
- Church: Episcopal Church
- Diocese: Northern Michigan
- Elected: 1964
- In office: 1964–1972
- Predecessor: Herman R. Page Jr.
- Successor: Samuel J. Wylie

Orders
- Ordination: May 1931 by Warren Lincoln Rogers
- Consecration: October 1, 1964 by John Pares Craine

Personal details
- Born: June 4, 1905 Steubenville, Ohio, United States
- Died: February 28, 1989 (aged 83)
- Denomination: Anglican
- Parents: Richard David Selway & Jennett Williams
- Spouse: Edna Marie Wright (m. 1934)
- Children: 4
- Education: Kenyon College

George Rhys Selway (June 4, 1905 – February 28, 1989) was bishop of the Diocese of Northern Michigan in The Episcopal Church, serving from 1964 to 1972.

== Early life and education ==
Selway was born in Steubenville, Ohio, on June 4, 1905, the son of Richard David Selway and Jennett Williams. He was educated in public schools, and then at Kenyon College where he was a member of Sigma Pi fraternity. He graduated with a Bachelor of Arts in 1929 and was awarded a Doctor of Divinity in 1947. He also studied at Bexley Hall which awarded him a Bachelor of Divinity in 1930.

== Ordination and career ==
Selway was ordained deacon in June 1930 and priest in May 1931 by the Bishop of Ohio Warren Lincoln Rogers. He married Edna Marie Wright on September 17, 1934, and together had four children. He served as priest-in-charge of Trinity Church in New Philadelphia, Ohio, between 1930 and 1932, and then as curate of St Paul's Church in Akron, Ohio, between 1932 and 1934. In 1934, he became rector of St Mark's Church in Toledo, Ohio, where he remained till 1945. He served as rector of St Paul's Church in Lansing, Michigan, from 1945 to 1959. Prior to his election as bishop, he was dean of Trinity Cathedral in Phoenix.

== Bishop ==
Selway was consecrated as bishop on October 1, 1964 in St Paul's Church, Marquette, Michigan. He was very liberal and concerned with urban problems and social activism which weren't priorities for many in his new diocese. However, he was an avid fly fisherman, hunter, and sailor. These qualities, and much travel, helped him fit in with the people of northern Michigan. As bishop he dispersed more leadership responsibilities to lay people, which paved the way for the Mutual Ministry model used later. In 1969, women in the diocese were allowed to become wardens of vestries. He was also able to make progress in increasing base pay and benefits for the clergy in the diocese

After his retirement in 1972, he became the first executive director of Episcopal Community Services in Arizona.
