= Ricardo Gomez Osnaya =

Anglican bishop

Ricardo Joel Gómez Osnaya is a bishop in the Anglican Church of Mexico. He became the fourth bishop of the Diocese of Western Mexico after his consecration on April 13, 2018. He previously served as archdeacon of San Luis Potosí.
