= Herman Page (father) =

American Episcopal bishop (1866–1942)

The Right Reverend Herman Riddle Page D.D.
- Bishop of Northern Michigan
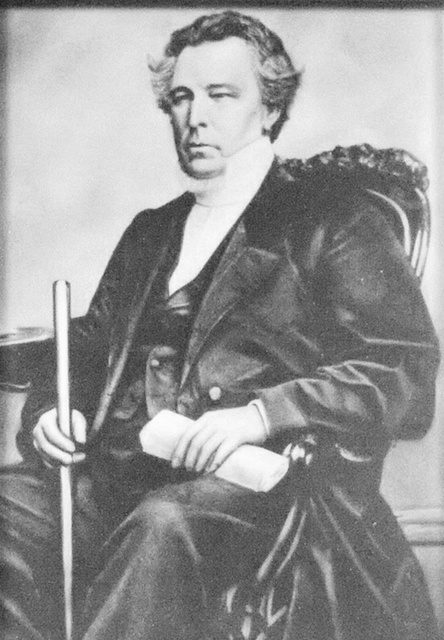
- Church: Episcopal Church
- Diocese: Northern Michigan
- Elected: November 15, 1939
- In office: 1939–1942
- Predecessor: Hayward S. Ablewhite
- Successor: Herman R. Page, Jr.
- Previous posts: Bishop of Spokane (1915-1923); Bishop of Idaho (1919); Bishop of Michigan (1924-1939)

Orders
- Ordination: November 1891 by Ethelbert Talbot
- Consecration: January 28, 1915 by Daniel S. Tuttle

Personal details
- Born: May 23, 1866 Boston, Massachusetts, United States
- Died: April 21, 1942 (aged 75) Ann Arbor, Michigan, United States
- Buried: St Paul's Cathedral
- Denomination: Anglican
- Parents: Eben Blake Page & Harriet Josephine Woodward
- Spouse: Mary Moorhead Riddle
- Children: Herman R. Page, Jr.
- Education: Harvard University

Herman Riddle Page (May 23, 1866 – April 21, 1942) was an American bishop in the Episcopal Church in the United States of America. He was the second bishop of the Missionary District of Spokane, fourth bishop of the Idaho, fifth bishop of the Michigan, and fourth bishop of the Northern Michigan. His son, Herman R. Page, Jr., succeeded him as bishop of the Episcopal Diocese of Northern Michigan.

== Biography ==
Page was born in Boston, Massachusetts, on May 23, 1866, to Eben Blake Page and Harriet Josephine (née Woodward). He attended the Boston Latin School and Harvard University (A.B. 1888). In 1891 he graduated from the Episcopal Theological School in Cambridge and was ordained that year. He held several positions including Holy Trinity Mission, Wallace, Idaho (a mining camp); St. Luke's Church in Coeur d'Alene, Idaho; St. John's Church in Fall Rivers, Massachusetts and Christ Church, Swanee. In 1900 he moved to St. Paul's Church in Chicago, Illinois, and in 1915 became the bishop of the Missionary District of Spokane, Washington. He served as chair of the Episcopal Church's Commission on Marriage and Divorce during a period when divorce was the subject of debate.

He was married to Mary Riddle Page, had a brother, John E. Page of Boston, and a son, the Reverend Herman R. Page.

Episcopal Church (USA) titles
| Preceded by Lemuel Henry Wells | 2nd Bishop of the Missionary District of Spokane; 1915 – 1923 | Succeeded by Edward Makin Cross |
| Preceded by Charles D. Williams | 5th Bishop of Michigan; 1924 - 1939 | Succeeded by Frank W. Creighton |
| Preceded by James B. Funsten | 4th Bishop of Idaho; 1919 | Succeeded by Frank H. Touret |
| Preceded by Hayward Ablewhite | 4th Bishop of Northern Michigan; 1939 - 1942 | Succeeded by Herman R. Page, Jr. |
