= Herman Page (son) =

American Episcopal bishop (1892–1977)

The Right Reverend Herman Riddle Page Jr. D.D.
- Bishop of Northern Michigan
- Church: Episcopal Church
- Diocese: Northern Michigan
- Elected: May 26, 1942
- In office: 1942–1964
- Predecessor: Herman R. Page Sr.
- Successor: George R. Selway

Orders
- Ordination: May 1917 by Herman R. Page Sr.
- Consecration: October 23, 1942 by Henry St. George Tucker

Personal details
- Born: May 3, 1892 Coeur d'Alene, Idaho, United States
- Died: November 10, 1977 (aged 85) Menominee, Michigan, United States
- Buried: Riverside Cemetery, Menominee, Michigan
- Denomination: Anglican
- Parents: Herman R. Page Sr. & Mary Moorhead
- Spouse: Lois Dickinson (m. 1922; died 1930) Gwendolyn Cummins (m. 1933)
- Children: 1
- Education: Harvard University

Herman Riddle Page Jr. (May 3, 1892 – November 10, 1977) was an American prelate of the Episcopal Church who served as the fifth Bishop of Northern Michigan from 1942 till 1964.

== Early life, education, and family ==
Page was born on May 3, 1892, in Coeur d'Alene, Idaho, the son of the Reverend Herman R. Page who later became the forth Bishop of Northern Michigan, and Mary Moorhead. He was educated in the Hyde Park High School in Boise, Idaho, and then studied at Harvard University, from where he graduated with a Bachelor of Arts in 1913, and a postgraduate degree in 1914. He also attended the Episcopal Theological School and earned a Bachelor of Sacred Theology in 1917. Page married Lois Dickinson on June 25, 1922, and together they had one son. Lois died in 1930, and Page married Gwendolyn Byllesby Cummins on June 26, 1933.

== Ordained ministry ==
Page was ordained deacon on August 6, 1916, and priest in May 1917, on both occasions by his father Herman R. Page. After ordination, Page became an army chaplain and served till 1919. In 1918 he Chaplain of the 13th Division. He then served as priest-in-charge of St John's Church in Okanogan, Washington, and St Paul's Church in Omak, Washington, between 1919 and 1922, and then as priest-in-charge of St Luke's Church in Wenatchee, Washington, from 1922 till 1923. In 1923, he was appointed rector of St Michael's Church in Yakima, Washington, while in 1925, he became assistant priest at St Paul's Cathedral in Boston. Between 1927 and 1942, he served as rector of St Paul's Church in Dayton, Ohio. He also served as an army chaplain between 1941 and 1942 during WWII.

== Bishop ==
Page's father died in April 1942, and he was elected on the first ballot to succeed him as Bishop of Northern Michigan on May 26, 1942, during the annual diocesan convention. He was consecrated on October 23, 1942, in St Paul's Church, Dayton, Ohio, by Presiding Bishop Henry St. George Tucker. He also served as a member of the Michigan Civil Defence Council, chaplain of the Michigan State Police, and president of the Episcopal Province of Midwest from 1951 to 1957. Page retired in 1964 and served at Holy Innocents Church in Little Lake, Michigan. He died in November 1977 of a heart attack.
