= Francisco Manuel Moreno =

Mexican Anglican bishop (1950–2024)

The Right Reverend Francisco Manuel Moreno
- Archbishop of Mexico; Bishop of Northern Mexico
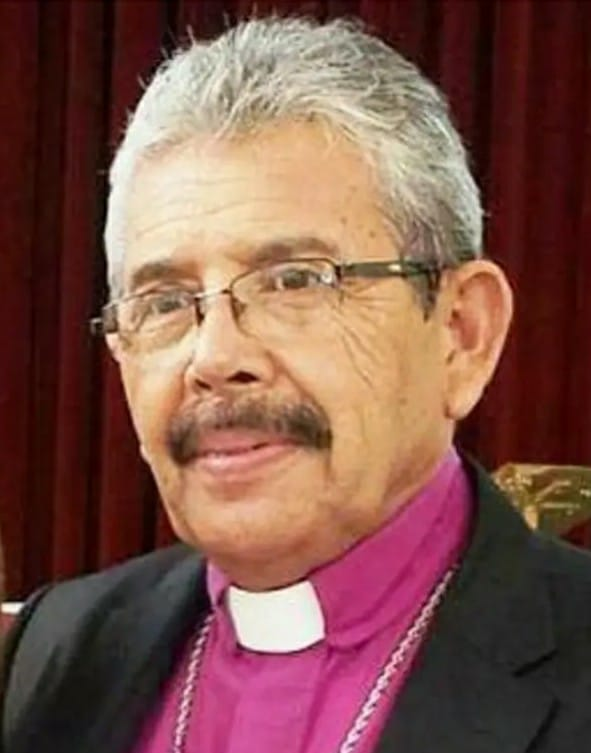
- Church: Anglican Church of Mexico
- Diocese: Northern Mexico
- In office: 2010-2020
- Predecessor: Marcelino Rivera Delgado
- Successor: Oscar Pulido (disputed)

Orders
- Ordination: 1976

Personal details
- Born: 13 August 1950 Monterrey, Mexico
- Died: April 30, 2024 (aged 73)

Francisco Manuel Moreno (13 August 1950 – 30 April 2024) was a Mexican Anglican bishop who was primate of the Anglican Church of Mexico.

== Biography ==
He studied for the ministry at the San Andrés Seminary in Mexico City, being ordained a deacon in 1972 and a priest in 1974, for the Diocese of Northern Mexico.

He was bishop of Northern Mexico, from 5 March 2010 to November 2020. In 2013 he was elected IV Primate of the Anglican Church of Mexico at their 7th General Synod on 14 June 2013, with his installation taking place two days later. He retired effective 13 November 2020. During his primacy Mexico received the first ever visit of an Archbishop of Canterbury. In February 2020 he signed a new covenant with The Episcopal Church (USA).

In 2023 Moreno issued a communique where he did not recognize the result of the electoral synod electing his successor as diocesan bishop, alleging serious irregularities and violation of canon law to the point of qualifying it as an electoral fraud, and he was in fact still recognized as the only legitimate bishop by several congregations including the cathedral of the Northern Mexico diocese. In the same communique, he informed the readers that legally he was still the bishop of the diocese and that he was going to take legal proceedings against those responsible; he promised a new electoral synod with fairness and clear rules so a new bishop freely elected might succeed him.

In the fall of 2023, Moreno and two other bishops constituted a board claiming to be the Anglican Church of Mexico's legal governing board. In doing so, they voted to strip Anglican Church of Mexico Archbishop Enrique Treviño Cruz of his primacy and install Moreno as acting primate. According to news reports, "the dissenting bishops retain control of the financial accounts of the Diocese of the North and the Province of Mexico," and the Mexican court system found in favor of the group supporting Moreno. However, according to Linda Nicholls, regional Anglican primate for the Americas, the Anglican Communion Office would continue to recognize Treviño as primate.

Moreno unexpectedly died on April 30, 2024.

== Views ==
He was seen as a moderate in the context of the current divisions of the Anglican Communion, being friendly with the liberal pro-LGBT provinces, but still opposing civil same-sex marriages and the religious blessing of same-sex unions as the official policy of the province.

Anglican Communion titles
| Preceded by Carlos Touché Porter | Archbishop of Mexico; 2014-2020 | Succeeded by Enrique Treviño Cruz |
| Preceded by Marcelino Rivera Delgado | Bishop of Northern Mexico; 2010-2020 | Succeeded by Oscar Pulido (disputed) |
