= William A. Dimmick =

The Right Reverend William Arthur Dimmick D.D.
- Bishop of Northern Michigan
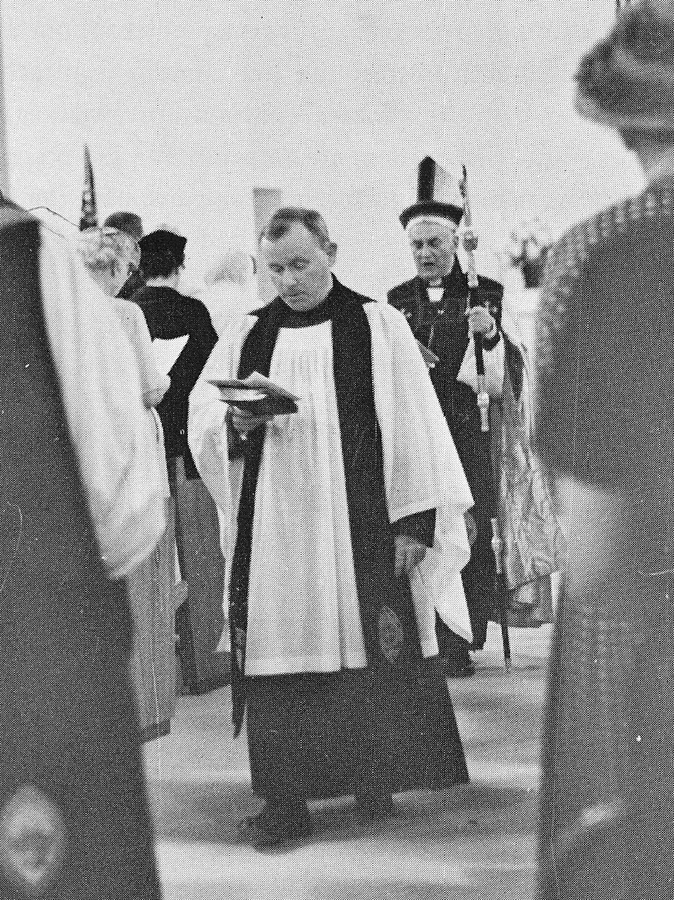
- William A. Dimmick as Dean of St Mary's Cathedral, Memphis
- Church: Episcopal Church
- Diocese: Northern Michigan
- In office: 1975–1981
- Predecessor: Samuel J. Wylie
- Successor: Thomas K. Ray

Orders
- Ordination: October 28, 1955 by John Vander Horst
- Consecration: May 23, 1975 by John Allin

Personal details
- Born: October 7, 1919 Paducah, Kentucky, United States
- Died: October 19, 1984 (aged 65) Birmingham, Alabama, United States
- Buried: Maplelawn Park Cemetery, Paducah, Kentucky
- Denomination: Anglican
- Parents: James Oscar Dimmick & Annis Amanda Crouch
- Education: Berea College; Yale Divinity School

William Arthur Dimmick (October 7, 1919 - October 19, 1984) was bishop of Northern Michigan in The Episcopal Church.

== Early life ==
Dimmick was born in 1919, the third of six children, in Paducah, Kentucky. When William was thirteen his father died and in 1937, due to the Ohio River flood, he and his family were forced from their home for weeks until the water subsided. Dimmick served in the Pacific Ocean theater of World War II.

== Career ==
Dimmick was a graduate of Berea College and held Masters and Doctoral degrees from Yale Divinity School. He was ordained deacon on March 19, 1955, by Bishop Theodore N. Barth of Tennessee and priest on October 28, 1955, by Bishop John Vander Horst. His first cure was St. Philip's, Nashville, Tennessee, where he was priest-in-charge from 1955 to 1960. From there he went to St. Mary's Cathedral, Memphis, first as canon and later as dean. During most of his tenure as dean, he also served as deputy to the General Convention. Also as dean, he was a member of the Tennessee Board of Examining Chaplains. From 1973 until his election to the episcopate, Dimmick was rector of Trinity Church, Southport, Connecticut. He was also a member of the Episcopal Church's Standing Liturgical Commission from 1973 until his death. Consecrated as Bishop of Northern Michigan in May 1975, Dimmick resigned that post in May 1981. He then served as assistant bishop in Minnesota, where he exercised an ecumenical ministry at a Roman Catholic abbey and university. For the year prior to his arrival here, he had been acting dean of Seabury-Western Theological Seminary in Evanston, Illinois. From August 1984 to his death, Dimmick served as assistant to the Rt. Rev. Bill Stough, Bishop of Alabama.

=== Response to the assassination of Martin Luther King Jr. ===
On April 5, 1968, the day after the assassination of Martin Luther King Jr., Memphis clergy from many churches and synagogues met at St. Mary's. In an impromptu move, Dimmick took up the cathedral's processional cross and led the assembled ministers down Poplar Avenue to City Hall to petition Mayor Henry C. Loeb to end the Memphis sanitation strike that King was in town to help negotiate. Nearly half of the cathedral's membership left during the following months, many in protest of Dimmick's gesture of racial unity.

== Personal life ==
Dimmick died on October 19, 1984, in Birmingham, Alabama, three days after having undergone open heart surgery. He was 65. The funeral service was held October 22 in his hometown of Paducah.
