= Diocese of Northern Michigan =

Episcopal Church diocese in the US

Diocese of Northern Michigan Diœcesis Michiganensis Septentrionalis

Location
- Country: United States
- Territory: The northern Michigan counties of Alger, Baraga, Chippewa, Delta, Dickinson, Gogebic, Houghton, Iron, Keweenaw, Luce, Mackinac, Marquette, Menominee, Ontonagon, and Schoolcraft
- Ecclesiastical province: Province V
- Headquarters: Marquette, Michigan
- Coordinates: 46°32′43″N 87°23′27″W

Statistics
- Congregations: 20 (2025)
- Members: 771 (2025)

Information
- Denomination: Episcopal Church
- Established: November 14, 1895

Current leadership
- Bishop: Rayford Jeffrey Ray

Map
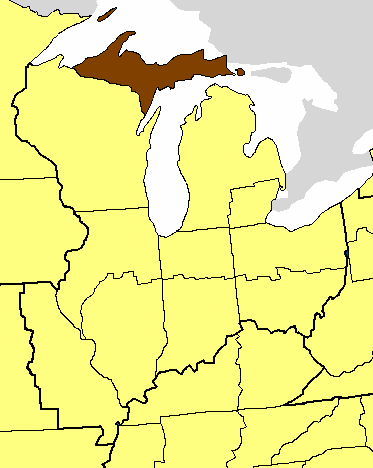
- Location of the Diocese of Northern Michigan

Website
- upepiscopal.org

The Episcopal Diocese of Northern Michigan is the diocese of the Episcopal Church in the United States of America (TEC) with canonical jurisdiction in the Upper Peninsula of Michigan. Diocesan membership decreased from 1,393 in 2015 to 771 in 2025. Average Sunday Attendance (ASA) also decreased from 475 in 2015 to a reported 333 in 2025. Plate and pledge income reported by the diocese for 2025 was $420,815.

== History ==
Initially part of the Episcopal Diocese of Michigan, it was designated a Missionary District in 1892, and became a separate diocese in 1895 as the Episcopal Diocese of Marquette. The diocese was renamed the Episcopal Diocese of Northern Michigan on June 2, 1937. It is headquartered in Marquette, Michigan.

Bishop Jim Kelsey, the bishop of the diocese, died in June 2007 in a car crash. At a diocesan convention in February 2009, Kevin Thew Forrester was elected the next bishop of the diocese. Any bishop's election requires the consent of the church's bishops along with the standing committees of the 110 dioceses and jurisdictions. A majority of the dioceses' standing committees and a majority of the church's bishops rejected his election because of Forrester's practice of Zen Buddhist meditation, revisions that he made to the baptismal liturgy, and his beliefs about salvation. After the deadline for consent passed, in July 2009, Presiding Bishop Katharine Jefferts Schori announced that Forrester had become the first bishop-elect in 77 years to have his election declared "null and void" by the church. The last candidate rejected on strictly theological grounds was James DeKoven in 1875 for his high church practices.

In December 2010, a diocesan convention elected Rayford Ray as bishop. His election was confirmed by the Episcopal Church, and after his consecration in May 2011 he became the 11th diocesan bishop of the diocese.

== Bishops ==
1. 1896-1919: Gershom Mott Williams (elected November 14, 1895, ordained May 1, 1896; resigned October 1919)
2. 1918-1929: Robert LeRoy Harris (February 1918 Coadjutor, October 1919 Bishop; resigned 1929)
3. 1930-1939: Hayward S. Ablewhite (elected December 1929; resigned when indicted in a defalcation and embezzlement case in October 1939, served nine months in state prison)
4. 1939-1942: Herman Riddle Page Sr. († April 1942)
5. 1942-1964: Herman Riddle Page Jr. (* May 3, 1892, † 1977)
6. 1964-1972: George R. Selway
7. 1972-1974: Samuel J. Wylie († 1974)
8. 1975-1981: William A. Dimmick
9. 1982-1999: Thomas K. Ray
10. 1999-2007: Jim Kelsey
  2007-2011: vacant
11. 2011–present: Rayford Jeffrey Ray
