= Henry D. Aves =

Right Reverend Henry Damerel Aves
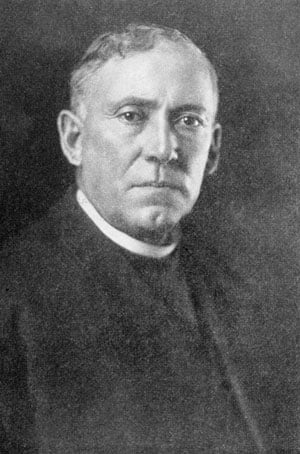
- Church: The Episcopal Church

Orders
- Consecration: December 14, 1904

Personal details
- Born: July 10, 1853 Huron County, Ohio
- Died: September 20, 1936 (aged 83) Seabrook, Texas

Henry Damerel Aves (July 10, 1853—September 20, 1936) was a missionary bishop of The Episcopal Church, serving in Mexico from his consecration in 1904. His primary ministry was to English-speaking congregations.
