= José G. Saucedo =

Bishop of the Anglican Church of Mexico

The Right Reverend José Guadalupe Saucedo Mendoza D.D.
- Bishop in the Anglican Church of Mexico
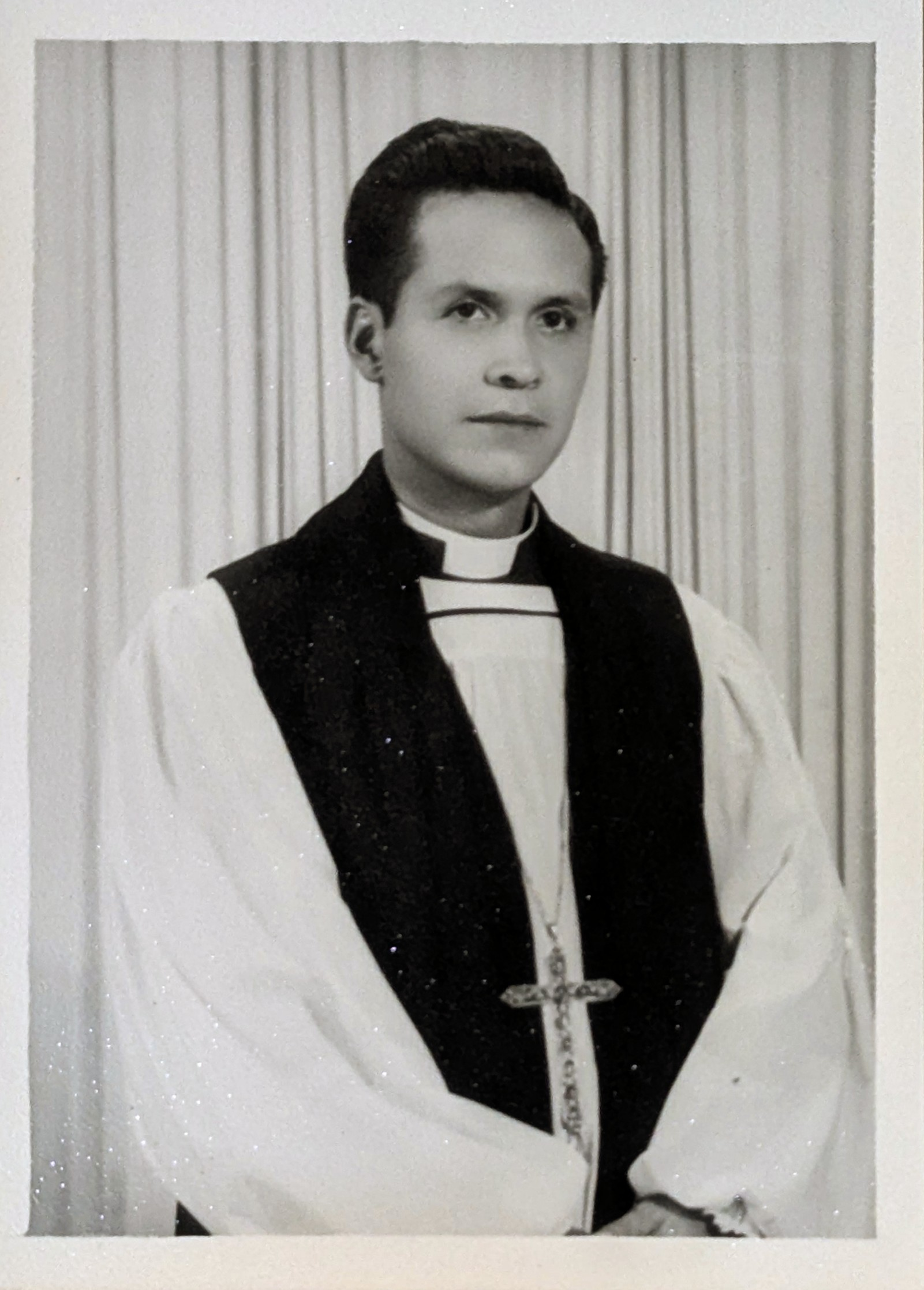
- Diocese: Anglican Diocese of Cuernavaca
- In office: 1958–1997

Orders
- Consecration: January 1958

Personal details
- Born: 5 December 1924 Michoacán
- Died: 7 August 1997 Mexico City
- Denomination: Anglican
- Occupation: Theologian, Bishop
- Education: Virginia Theological Seminary, Alexandria, Virginia, USA.

José G. Saucedo Mendoza (December 5, 1924 – August 7, 1998) was a Mexican Anglican bishop from 1958 to 1997.

He was the first bishop of Cuernavaca, and the first archbishop of the Anglican Church of Mexico, serving from 1995 until his retirement in 1997. Under his episcopacy spanning four decades the Anglican Church of Mexico grew from one missionary diocese to five dioceses that formed an independent member of the worldwide Anglican Communion in 1995 under his episcopacy and leadership. As a promoter of access to the priesthood by women, he arranged for the ordination of the first female priest in Latin America. He attended the Episcopal Church's Virginia Theological Seminary, at Alexandria, Virginia. He was consecrated bishop in 1958 at XVII century church of San Jose de Gracia, Mexico City.
