= St. Paul's Episcopal Church (Evansville, Indiana) =

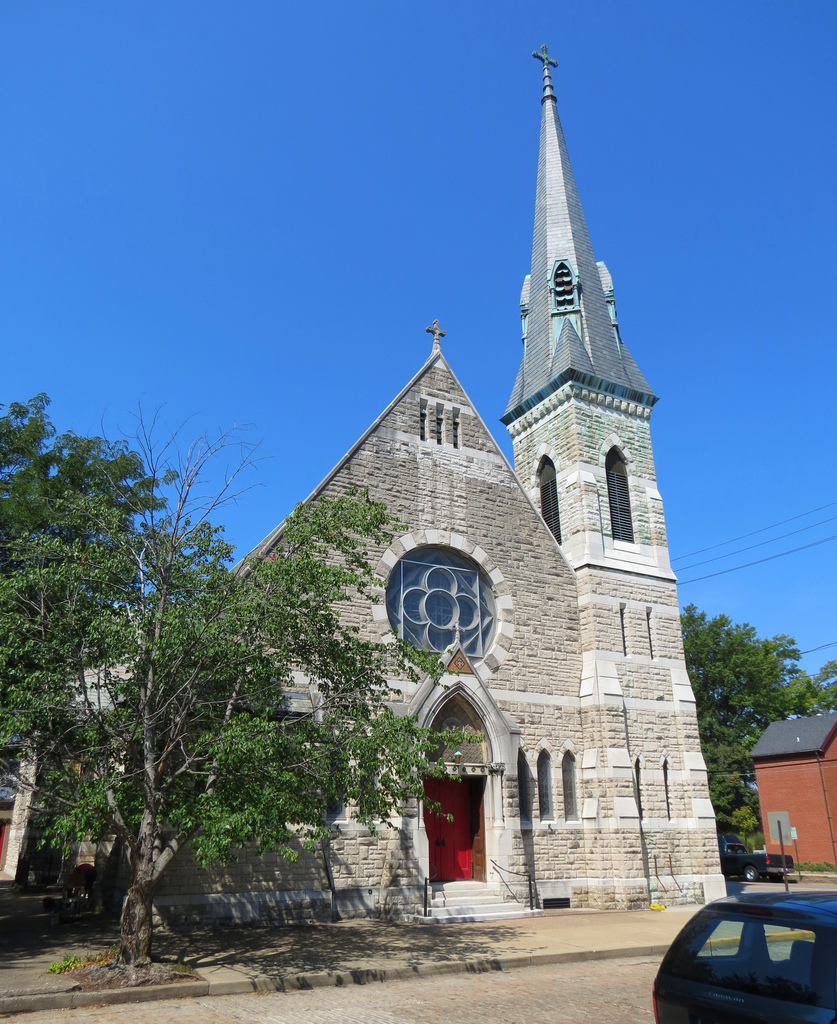
- St. Paul's Episcopal Church in 2019
- St. Paul's Episcopal Church
- Location: Evansville, Vanderburgh County, Indiana, United States
- Denomination: Episcopal Church
- Website: stpaulsevv.org

History
- Founded: 1836
- Founder: Jackson Kemper

Architecture
- Architect: Reid & Reid
- Style: English Gothic Revival
- Years built: 1886

Administration
- Diocese: Episcopal Diocese of Indianapolis

Clergy
- Bishop(s): Jennifer Baskerville-Burrows, Bishop of Indianapolis
- Rector: Holly Rankin Zaher
- St. Paul's Episcopal Church
- U.S. National Register of Historic Places
- U.S. Historic district – Contributing property
- Location within Indiana Location within the United States
- Coordinates: 37°57′50″N 87°34′10″W
- Area: 0.3 acres (0.12 ha)
- Built: 1886
- Architect: Reid & Reid
- Architectural style: English Gothic Revival
- NRHP reference No.: 78000059
- Added to NRHP: November 14, 1978

St. Paul's Episcopal Church is an Episcopal parish church located in Evansville, Indiana, within the Episcopal Diocese of Indianapolis. The parish was formally organized in 1836 after a missionary visit from Bishop Jackson Kemper. The present-day church building was erected in 1886 on the corner of 1st and Chestnut St. in downtown Evansville to replace the parish's first church built on the same site. Designed by architects James W. Reid & Merritt J. Reid, the English Gothic Revival-style structure was constructed with Bedford limestone and trimmed with Green River limestone. St. Paul's is known for being the home parish of various prominent figures in Evansville's history. It is also known for its community service, including a weekend soup kitchen through Sr. Joanna's Table.

The church reported 240 members in 2015 and 221 members in 2023; no membership statistics were reported nationally in 2024 parochial reports. Plate and pledge income reported for the congregation in 2024 was $188,000. Average Sunday attendance (ASA) in 2024 was 55 persons, down from a reported 93 in 2019.

St. Paul's Episcopal Church was added to the National Register of Historic Places on July 17, 1978, as part of the larger Riverside Historic District in downtown Evansville.

== History ==
Evansville's first Episcopalians organized themselves as St. Paul's parish, the first Protestant Episcopal parish in Evansville on January 9, 1836. Rev. Archibald H. Lamon served as the first rector from 1836 to 1844. The congregation met in the first Vanderburgh County Courthouse until January 12, 1840, when the first church building on 1st and Chestnut was consecrated by Bishop Jackson Kemper. After Rev. Lamon left the congregation in March 1844 to pursue missionary work in Louisiana, the congregation went through a series of rectors as follows:

- The Rev. B.H. Hicox (invited 1844, died before assuming duties)
- The Rev. William Vaux (1844–1845, educated in England, brought to America by Bishop Kemper, left to become US army chaplain on the western frontier)
- The Rev. N.A. Okeson (1845–1846)
- The Rev. Colley A. Foster (1847–1856)
- The Rev. Anthony Ten Broeck (1856–1857)
- The Rev. Sidney Wilbur (1857–1859)
- The Rev. Elias Birdsall (1860–1864, left to become the first rector of St. Athanasius Episcopal Church in Los Angeles, the first Protestant Episcopal parish in Southern California)
- The Rev. H.W. Spaulding (1865–1867)
- The Rev. W.H. Van Antwerp (1868–1874)
- The Rev. W.N. Webbe (1874–1879)
- The Rev. Theodore I. Holcombe (1880–1881)
- The Rev. Charles Morris (1881–1894)

Under the leadership of Rev. Morris, St. Paul's Episcopal parish vestry passed a resolution to build a new church building. The final service in the first church building was held on April 15, 1883. While construction ensued, a congregant and frequent benefactor, Charles Viele, offered the use of Viele Hall (located on 2nd street between Main and Sycamore streets) to St. Paul's parish. The cornerstone for new St. Paul's was laid on September 3, 1883, and construction completed on March 2, 1886, with Bishop D.B. Knickerbacker consecrating the new building. Charles and Mary Viele continued to sponsor further construction on the church grounds – first with a rectory (1886) and later a chapel named in honor of the Viele family (1887).

The next series of rectors were as follows:

- The Rev. W. Northey Jones (1894–1897)
- The Rev. Joseph Marshall Francis (1897–1899, later became Bishop of Diocese of Indianapolis)
- The Rev. Dr. John Davis (1899–1904, a former theology teacher at an Episcopal mission in Japan)
- The Rev. William Reid Cross (1904–1911)
- The Rev. John Boden (1911–1913)
- The Rev. Horace Weeks Jones (1914, died in an automobile accident)
- The Rev. A.L. Murray (1914–1918)
- The Rev. W.R. Plummer (1918–1923, died during mid-week service in Viele chapel of heart attack)
- The Rev. E. Ainger Powell (1923–1931), later became rector of Christ Church Cathedral in Indianapolis
- The Rev. Joseph G. Moore (1932–1943)

Rev. Moore served as a dynamic leader not only at St. Paul's but also in the broader Southwestern Indiana community. During the Great Depression when nearby Episcopal churches could not afford full-time clergy, he made time to visit these parishes for services to keep them open. He formed a cadre of laypeople assist him in these services, which became known as the Evansville Associate Mission of Southwestern Indiana. Rev. Moore also was a strong advocate for civil rights causes. He held the position of National Field Secretary for the Church League for Industrial Democracy, which brought him into contact with activists AJ Muste & Claude C Williams, Leon Trotsky's bodyguard Henry Schnautz, and other socialists of the 1930s. Rev. Moore supported local labor unions and condemned corrupt local elections through the League for Clean Elections.

Rev. Moore also played a significant role in creating better race relations in Evansville. During World War II, Rev. Moore & the vestry invited a group of black workers in the Civilian Conservation Corps & their African-American Episcopalian chaplain to worship at St. Paul's on Sundays - the first documented integrated church service in Evansville. This action was taken despite the bishop's opposition to a previously integrated mid-week service. In addition, Rev. Moore brought future Supreme Court justice Thurgood Marshall to Evansville for help in creating a local chapter of the NAACP.

In 1937, Evansville experienced a severe flood which severely damaged the interior of St. Paul's. The flood damage later contributed to the shorting out of wiring connected to the organ, causing a massive fire on March 27, 1938. Between the flood and the fire, the interior was gutted and remodeled while the exterior stonework remained.

After Rev. Moore left to become a US army chaplain in February 1943, Rev. Imri Blackburn became rector and served until February 14, 1954, when he resigned to accept a professorship at Seabury Western Seminary. The next series of rectors followed:

- The Rev. W. Robert Webb (1954–1971)
- The Rev. Richard Wyatt (1972–1978)
- The Rev. Thomas N. Sandy (1978–1985)
- The Rev. Henry Doherty (1985–1987)
- The Rev. James B. Hempstead (1990–1998)
- The Rev. Shane Scott-Hamblen (1999–2002)
- The Rev. J. Raymond Lord (2002–2003)
- The Rev. Richard R. Godbold (2003–2016)

In 2017, St. Paul's vestry invited the Rev. Holly Rankin Zaher to be the first female rector of the parish.

=== Notable people ===
- Charles Harvey Denby
- Edwin Denby (politician)
- Charles Denby Jr.
- Gordon Granger, married his wife Maria at St. Paul's in 1869

== Worship services ==
- Sunday worship services: 8 a.m. (Rite I), 10:30 a.m. (Rite II with sung choral)
- Weekday worship services: Eucharist at noon

== Pictures ==
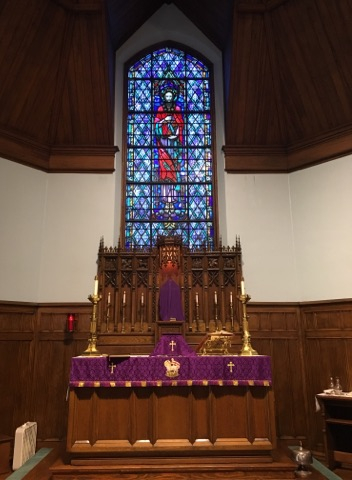

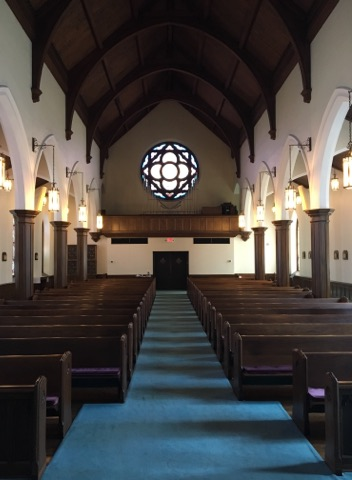

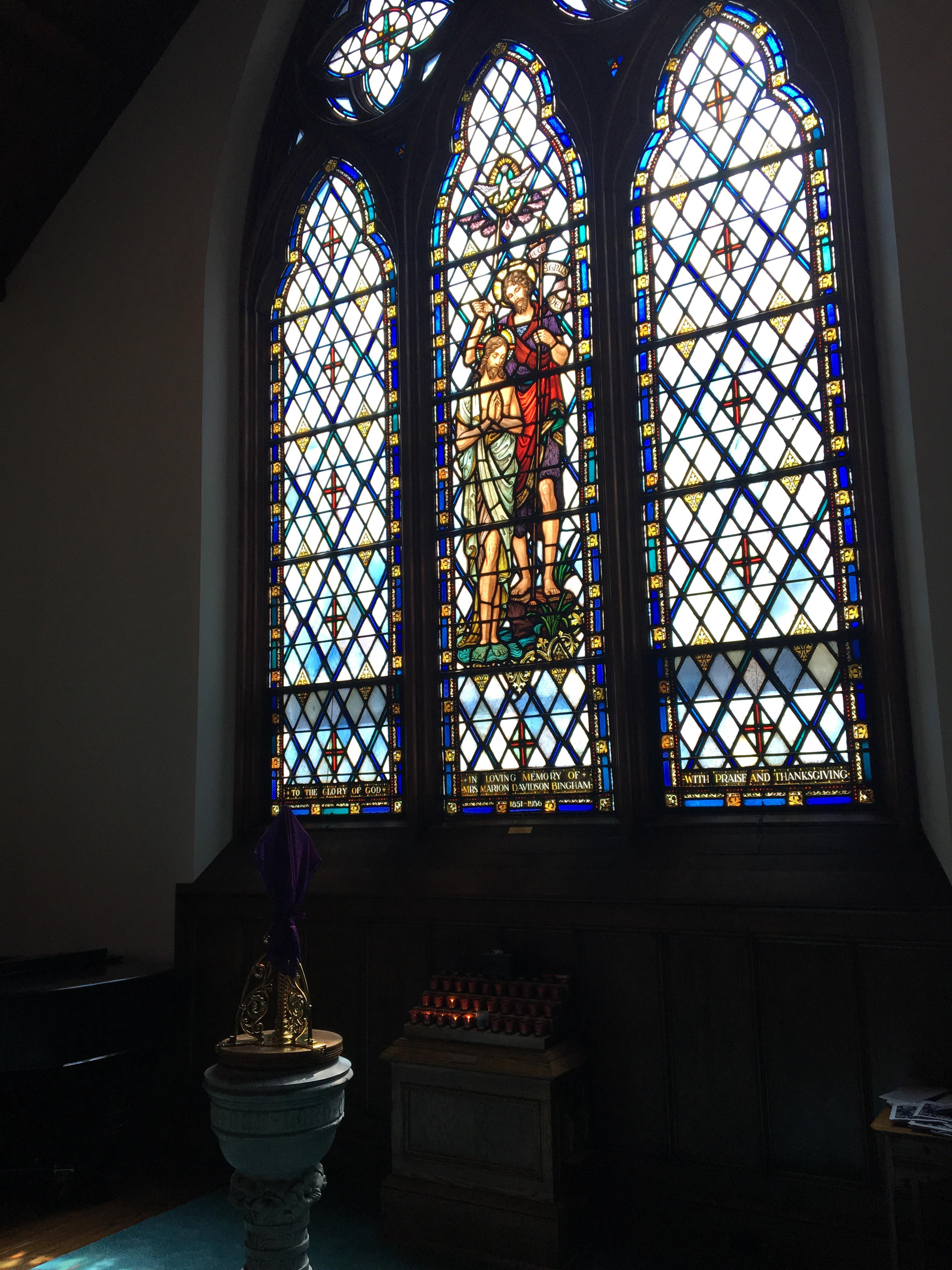
Baptismal Font & Northside Facing Stained Glass Window

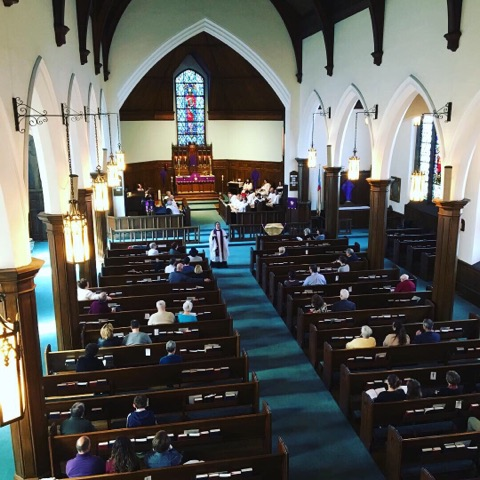
