= Episcopal Church of All Saints (Indianapolis) =

The Episcopal Church of All Saints
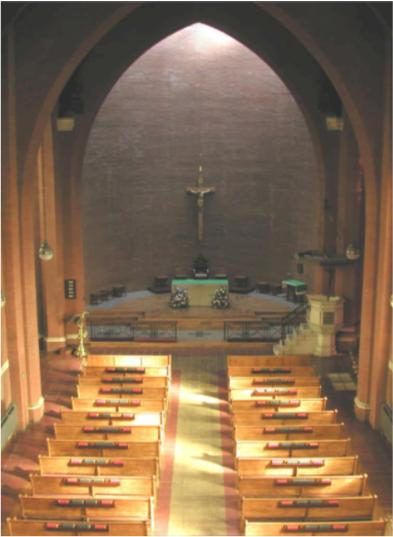
- The nave of All Saints Church

- Location within Indianapolis Location within Indiana Location within the United States
- 39.787780°N 86.149356°W
- Location: 1559 Central Avenue, Indianapolis, Indiana, United States
- Denomination: Episcopal
- Website: www.allsaintsindy.org

Architecture
- Architect: Alfred Grindle
- Style: Early Gothic Revival
- Completed: 1910

Administration
- Diocese: Episcopal Diocese of Indianapolis

Clergy
- Bishop: The Rt. Rev. Jennifer Baskerville-Burrows
- Rector: The Rt. Rev. Jeffrey Lee, Interim

The Episcopal Church of All Saints serves the Old Northside Historic District near downtown Indianapolis. It is distinctive within the diocese for its Anglo-Catholic style of worship, and is historically significant as the first Episcopal Church in the United States to regularly ordain a woman as priest. The building also served as the cathedral of the Episcopal Diocese of Indianapolis from 1911 until 1954, when the bishop's seat was relocated to Christ Church Cathedral, Indianapolis.

The church reported 219 members in 2022 and 194 members in 2023; no membership statistics were reported in 2024 parochial reports. Plate and pledge income reported for the congregation in 2024 was $268,285 with average Sunday attendance (ASA) of 79 persons.

== History ==
All Saints is the successor to Grace Church, a parish founded in 1866. Under Bishop David Knickerbacker, Grace Church became pro-cathedral of the Diocese of Indiana in the late 19th century. Construction of All Saints Cathedral began on the site of Grace Church in 1910. The building was dedicated on All Saints Day in 1911. The 1912 diocesan convention designated the cathedral as "a House of Prayer, where all persons, of whatever race or nation, may have opportunity to worship God".

All Saints Church began a period of turmoil marked by its losing its cathedral status in 1954 as well as the change in neighborhood demographics following the end of World War II. This upheaval culminated in an outreach to the burgeoning African-American inner-city population, including the creation of a treble choir for children affiliated with the Royal School of Church Music. This program flourished throughout the 1960s, and it was during this time that the congregation affixed a sign above the west doors reading "Everyone Is Welcome".

On January 1, 1977, the Rev. Jacqueline Means became the first woman to be regularly ordained as a priest in the Episcopal Church. The ordination was controversial within the congregation, with only 75 people attending her first celebration of communion the following morning, compared to regular Sunday attendance at the time of 90–120. The Rev. Tanya Vonnegut Beck, who served as All Saints' priest-in-charge from 2010 to 2012, was the second woman regularly ordained in the Episcopal Church.

All Saints Church also built bridges to the homeless community of downtown Indianapolis throughout the 1970s and 1980s. This activity culminated in the founding of the Dayspring Center in 1989, an institution sponsored by the Episcopal Diocese of Indianapolis and that operates in a building adjacent to the church.

In the 1990s, the congregation recognized the profound cultural impact of the AIDS epidemic by honoring many victims of the epidemic in memorial services. This outreach is memorialized by a crystal chalice inlaid with jewels for use at the Eucharist as a memorial to those who died of AIDS.

In recent times, the parish community has evolved to reflect the changing demographic of the neighborhood. The congregation sponsors community meetings, a concert series known as Arts at All Saints, and many other programs focused on spiritual growth and fellowship.

== Architecture ==
The building constructed in 1910 as the Cathedral of All Saints is a brick American Gothic Revival church. The plans as designed by Alfred Grindle followed the English collegiate style layout with a chancel nearly as long as the nave. Due to funding restrictions, only the nave and crossing were constructed according to the plans. A wooden structure served as the chancel, significantly limiting the architectural impact of the building. By the late 1950s this clapboard annex was structurally unsound, and a new brick apse and sacristy designed by the firm Evans Woollen and Associates replaced the old chancel. The curved wall of the new apse contrasts greatly with the rectilinear rigidity of the Gothic nave. This dissonance is viewed by many as a stylistic strength of the building in its blending of hard and soft architectural forms. Acoustically, the curved apse wall promotes dissemination and reverberation of sound, creating a space much noted for its use in musical performance.

The two transepts are used as chapels. The north transept is a traditional Lady Chapel complete with altar, statue of the Blessed Virgin Mary and devotional accouterments. The south transept is dedicated to Saint Michael the Archangel and is used weekly for midweek mass services.

The only stained glass windows in the church are located in the south transept Michael Chapel. A large triptych in lancet windows depicts Michael expelling Lucifer from Paradise. A lower triptych of quasi-clerestory windows depicts traditional themes in contemporary contexts: a Nativity with the Virgin depicted as an inner-city African-American mother, a Crucifixion in an urban scene of racism, and a manifestation of the Holy Spirit at Pentecost symbolized by the universality of satellites orbiting the Earth. The windows were designed, fabricated and installed by Margaret A. Kennedy (1930 - ).

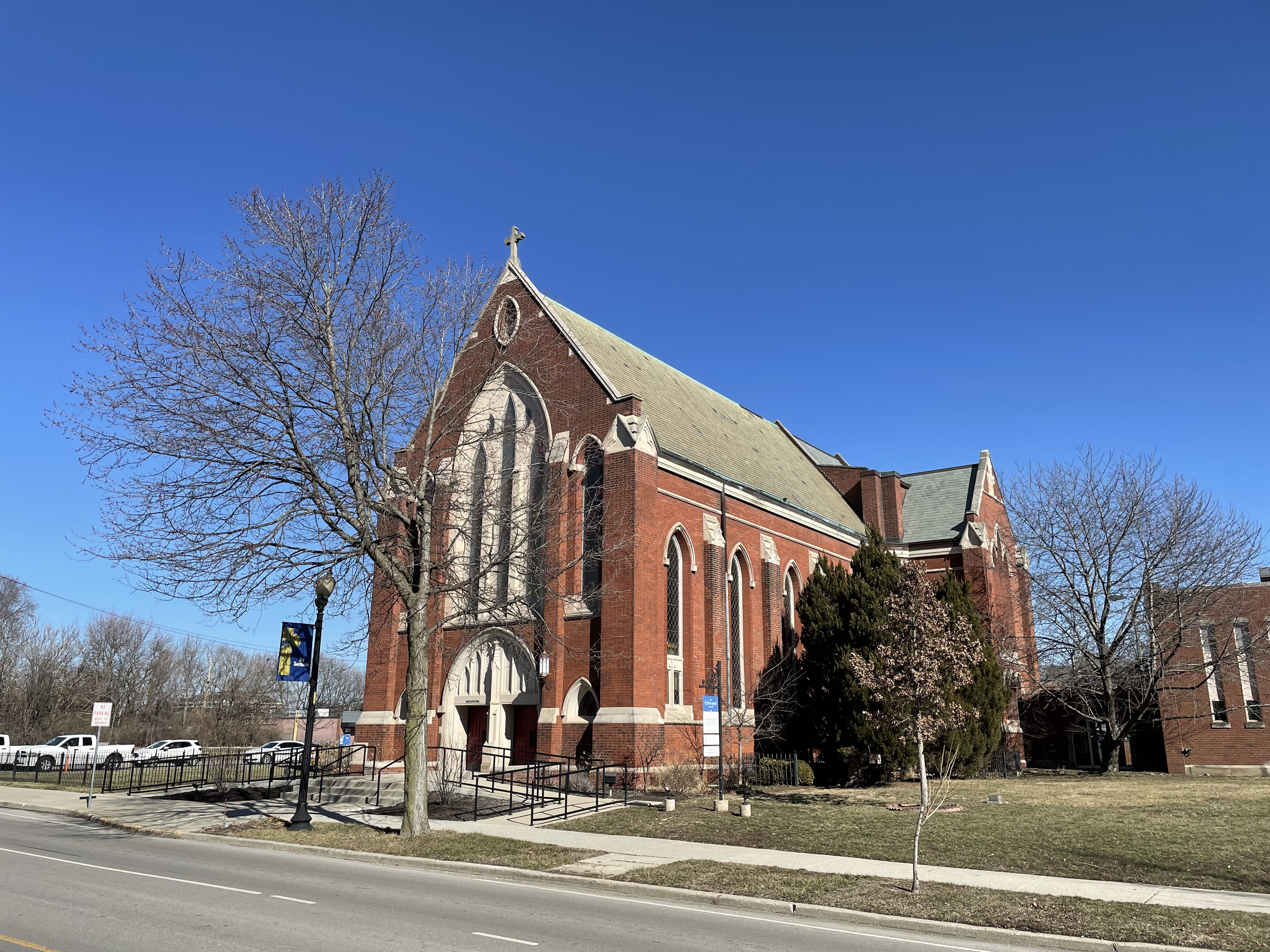
Exterior view from Central Ave
