= John Pares Craine =

Bishop (1911–1977)

The Right Reverend John Pares Craine D.D.
- Bishop of Indianapolis
- Church: Episcopal Church
- Diocese: Indianapolis
- Elected: December 4, 1956
- In office: 1959–1977
- Predecessor: Richard A. Kirchhoffer
- Successor: Edward W. Jones
- Previous post: Coadjutor Bishop of Indianapolis (1957-1959)

Orders
- Ordination: April 1936 by Warren Lincoln Rogers
- Consecration: April 29, 1957 by Richard A. Kirchhoffer

Personal details
- Born: June 28, 1911 Cleveland, Ohio, United States
- Died: December 24, 1977 (aged 66) Indianapolis, Indiana, United States
- Buried: Crown Hill Cemetery
- Denomination: Anglican
- Parents: John Lee Craine & Hilda B. Wright
- Spouse: Esther Judson Strong
- Children: 3
- Education: Kenyon College

John Pares Craine (June 28, 1911 - December 24, 1977) was the eighth bishop of the Diocese of Indianapolis in The Episcopal Church, serving from 1959 until his death on Christmas Eve in 1977, shortly before his scheduled retirement. He supported the ordination of women.

== Early life and education ==
Craine was born in Cleveland, Ohio on June 28, 1911, to John Lee Craine and Hilda B. Wright. He was educated at the public schools of Geneva, Ohio. He then studied at Kenyon College and graduated with a Bachelor of Arts in 1932. He then read for a Bachelor of Divinity at Bexley Hall, which he earned in 1935. He was awarded a Doctor of Divinity from Kenyon College in 1952, and another from Wabash College in 1975. Craine married Esther Judson Strong on May 31, 1940, and together had three children.

== Ordained ministry ==
Craine was ordained deacon in October 1935, and priest in April 1936, on both occasions by Bishop Warren Lincoln Rogers of Ohio. He served as a student minister at St Mark's Church in Cleveland, Ohio between 1934 and 1935, and then as minister-in-charge of St Philip's Church in Cleveland, Ohio between 1935 and 1936. He was also curate of Trinity Church in Santa Barbara, California from 1936 till 1938. In 1938, he became rector of Trinity Church in Oakland, California, while in 1941, he became a canon of the cathedral chapter of Grace Cathedral in San Francisco. Between 1944 and 1950, he was rector of Trinity Church in Seattle. Between 1950 and 1957, he served as rector of Christ Church Cathedral in Indianapolis, and then also as dean from 1953, till 1957.

== Bishop ==
On December 4, 1956, Craine was elected Coadjutor Bishop of Indianapolis at a special diocesan convention. He was consecrated in the Scottish Rite Cathedral on April 29, 1957 by the Bishop of Indianapolis Richard A. Kirchhoffer. He then succeeded as diocesan bishop in 1959, remaining in office till his death in December 1977. Craine had been among the 67 bishops who sponsored the General Convention resolution to allow women to be ordained in the Episcopal Church.
