= Edward W. Jones =

American Episcopal clergy (1929–2007)

The Right Reverend Edward Witker Jones D.D.
- Bishop of Indianapolis
- Church: Episcopal Church
- Diocese: Indianapolis
- Elected: March 26, 1977
- In office: 1977–1997
- Predecessor: John Pares Craine
- Successor: Catherine Waynick
- Previous post: Coadjutor Bishop of Indianapolis (1977)

Orders
- Ordination: February 1, 1955 by Nelson M. Burroughs
- Consecration: September 10, 1977 by John Allin

Personal details
- Born: March 25, 1929 Toledo, Ohio, United States
- Died: July 28, 2007 (aged 78) Bloomington, Indiana, United States
- Buried: Saint Alban's Church, Indianapolis
- Denomination: Anglican
- Parents: Mason Beach Jones & Gertrude Witker
- Spouse: Martha Anne Shelburne
- Children: 3
- Education: Williams College

Edward Witker Jones (March 25, 1929 – July 28, 2007) was an American prelate of the Episcopal Church, who was the ninth Bishop of Indianapolis between 1977 and 1997.

== Early life and education ==
Jones was born on March 25, 1929, in Toledo, Ohio, the son of Mason Beach Jones and Gertrude Witker. He was educated at the Western Reserve Academy, and attended Williams College, from where he earned his Bachelor of Arts in 1951. After that he enrolled at the Virginia Theological Seminary, graduated with a Bachelor of Divinity in 1954, and was honored with a Doctor of Divinity in 1978. He married Martha Anne Shelburne on July 13, 1963, and together had three children.

== Ordained ministry ==
Jones was ordained deacon in 1954, and priest on February 1, 1955 by Bishop Nelson M. Burroughs of Ohio, in Grace Church, Sandusky, Ohio. He served as assistant minister at Grace Church in Sandusky, Ohio from 1954 till 1957, and then as rector of Christ Church in Oberlin, Ohio and Episcopal Chaplain to Oberlin College from 1957 till 1968. He was appointed assistant to the Bishop of Ohio in 1968, and served in that capacity till 1971, when he became rector of St James' Church in Lancaster, Pennsylvania, where he remained till 1977.

== Bishop ==
During a special meeting of the diocesan convention held at Christ Church Cathedral on March 26, 1977, Jones was elected Coadjutor Bishop of Indianapolis. He was consecrated on September 10, 1977, in Indianapolis. He succeeded as diocesan bishop earlier than expected, due to the death of Bishop John Pares Craine on December 24, 1977. Jones was a promoter of ecumenism, working closely with Christian and Jewish laity and clergy in Ohio, Pennsylvania, and Indiana. In 1996, he spoke in favor of closer unity with the Lutheran church. He was also a member of the Theology Committee of the House of Bishops which presented the case for the ordination of women to the episcopate to the 1988 Lambeth Conference. He retired in 1997.
