= Joseph C. Talbot =

American Episcopal bishop (1816–1883)

The Right Reverend Joseph Cruickshank Talbot D.D., LL.D.
- Bishop of Indiana
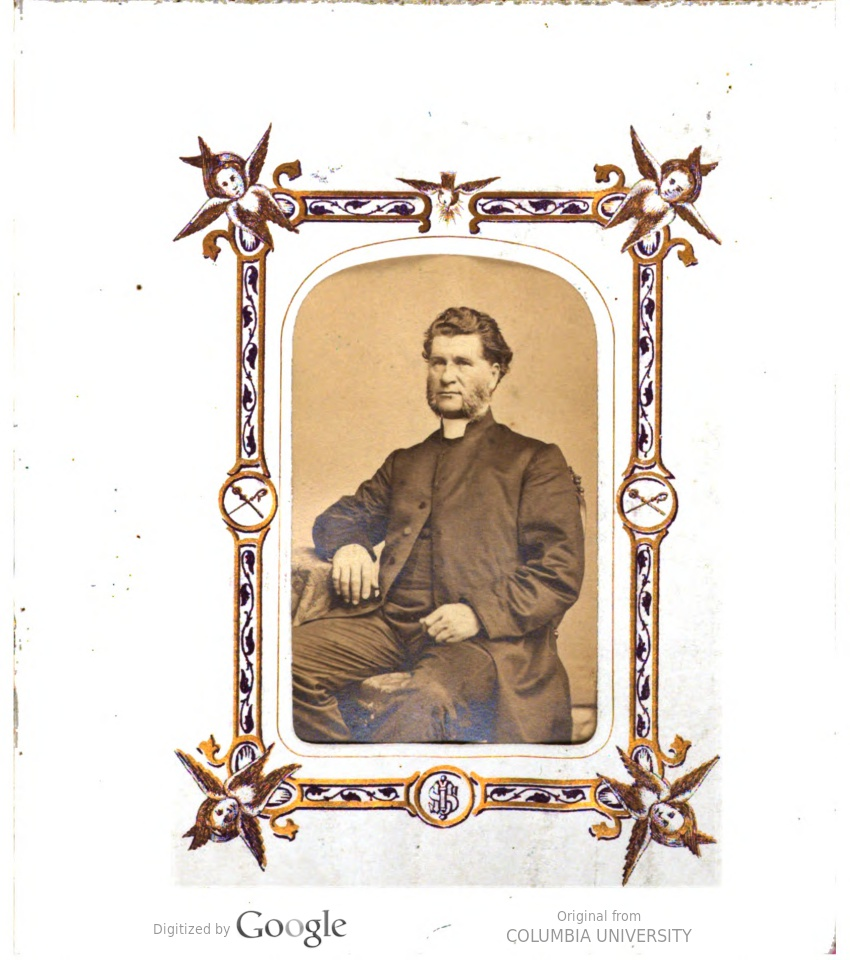
- Church: Episcopal Church
- Diocese: Indiana
- In office: 1872–1883
- Predecessor: George Upfold
- Successor: David Buel Knickerbacker
- Previous posts: Missionary Bishop of the Northwest (1860-1865); Assistant Bishop of Indiana (1865-1872)

Orders
- Ordination: September 6, 1848 by Benjamin B. Smith
- Consecration: February 15, 1860 by Jackson Kemper

Personal details
- Born: September 5, 1816 Alexandria, Virginia, United States
- Died: January 15, 1883 (aged 66) Indianapolis, Indiana, United States
- Denomination: Anglican (prev. Quaker)
- Spouse: Anna Matilda Wares

Joseph Cruikshank Talbot (September 5, 1816 – January 15, 1883) was the missionary bishop of the Northwest and the third bishop of the Episcopal Diocese of Indiana.

== Early life ==
Joseph Talbot was born to Quaker parents in Alexandria, Virginia, in 1816, where he attended the Pierpont Academy in his childhood. In 1835 he moved to Louisville, Kentucky, and was baptized in Christ Church there in 1837 and soon confirmed in the Episcopal Church. On February 23, 1838, he married Anna Matilda Wares, daughter of Samuel Waris, a captain of the United States Army.

== Early ministry ==
Talbot studied for ordination under Benjamin B. Smith and became a candidate for holy orders in 1843. He was ordained deacon on September 5, 1846, and priest on September 6, 1848, both by Smith. While in deacon's orders he organized a third church in Louisville, St. John's Church, and became the rector there upon his ordination to the priesthood. In January, 1853 he moved to Indianapolis, Indiana, and became the rector of Christ Church where he served seven years. He received the degree of D.D. from the Western University of Pennsylvania in 1854. In 1867 while at the Lambeth Conference, he was conferred with the degree of LL.D. by the University of Cambridge.

== Bishop of the Northwest ==
Talbot was elected by the House of Bishops as Missionary Bishop of the Northwest (or North-West) in 1859 and consecrated on February 15, 1860, by Jackson Kemper, assisted by Benjamin B. Smith, Cicero S. Hawks, George Upfold, and Gregory T. Bedell. The Missionary District of the Northwest included New Mexico, Dakota, Wyoming, Colorado, Arizona, Utah, Montana, and Idaho, covering nearly nine hundred thousand square miles. Talbot referred to himself as “Bishop of All Outdoors.” He served in this position for five years.

== Bishop of Indiana ==
On August 23, 1865, Talbot was elected Assistant Bishop of Indiana, where he began his duties that October. Due to diocesan bishop George Upfold’s feeble health, he acted as the virtual executive head of the diocese until Upfold's death in 1872. He took over as diocesan bishop on August 26, 1872. He served in this capacity until his death in 1883.
