= Diocese of Indianapolis =

Diocese or Archdiocese of Indianapolis may refer to the following ecclesiastical jurisdictions
with the episcopal or archepiscopal see in the city of Indianapolis, Indiana, USA:

- the Roman Catholic Archdiocese of Indianapolis (formerly Suffragan Diocese of Indianapolis, 1898–1944)
- the Episcopal Diocese of Indianapolis
