= Western Female Collegiate Institute =

Former school for women in Pittsburgh, Pennsylvania

Coordinates: 40.443°N 79.979°W

The Western Female Collegiate Institute was a school of higher learning for young ladies in Pittsburgh, Pennsylvania, that operated from 1833 until 1837.

The institute operated from a nine-room brick house on the Erin Hill farm grounds. This was east of the city limits in the 1830s, and the Monongahela River passed the property. Today, the location borders Centre Avenue on the north and Devilliers Street on the west.

Rev. William B. Lacey, DD opened the institute and was the president, and his wife, Elizabeth, was the governess. The school offered boarding, and advertisements stated 30 as the maximum number of pupils. The institute's design was to "impart an accurate and thorough knowledge of all the solid and polite branches of female education." The institute closed in 1837 after damaging reports circulated about Lacey, and enrollment declined.

Notable instructors included the Rev. George Upfold, DD and William E. A. Aikin.
