= Richard A. Kirchhoffer =

Bishop of the Episcopal Diocese of Indianapolis

The Right Reverend Richard Ainslie Kirchhoffer D.D., S.T.D.
- Bishop of Indianapolis
- Church: Episcopal Church
- Diocese: Indianapolis
- Elected: 1938
- In office: 1939–1959
- Predecessor: Joseph Marshall Francis
- Successor: John Pares Craine
- Previous post: Coadjutor Bishop of Indianapolis (1939)

Orders
- Ordination: March 26, 1917 by Thomas Frederick Davies Jr.
- Consecration: February 8, 1939 by Henry St. George Tucker

Personal details
- Born: June 28, 1890 Souris, Manitoba, Canada
- Died: May 31, 1977 (aged 86) Sonoma, California, United States
- Buried: Crown Hill Cemetery
- Denomination: Anglican
- Parents: Richard Beresford Kirchhoffer & Mary Elizabeth Young
- Spouse: Arline Leicester Wagner
- Children: 3
- Education: University of Southern California

Richard Ainslie Kirchhoffer (June 28, 1890 – May 31, 1977) was seventh bishop of the Episcopal Diocese of Indianapolis, serving from 1939 to 1959.

== Early life and education ==
Kirchhoffer was born in Souris, Manitoba, Canada on June 28, 1890, the son of Irish parents Richard Beresford Kirchhoffer (1854–1919) and Mary Elizabeth Young (1859–1944). His grandfather and two great-grandfathers were clergymen in the Church of Ireland. He studied at the University of Southern California in Los Angeles and earned a Bachelor of Arts in 1913. He also studied at the General Theological Seminary and graduated with a Bachelor of Divinity in 1916. He was awarded a Doctor of Sacred Theology from General, and a Doctor of Divinity from the University of Southern California, in 1939.

== Ordained ministry ==
Kirchhoffer was ordained deacon for the Diocese of California in April 1916 by Bishop Charles Fiske of Central New York, and became assistant at All Saints' Church in Worcester, Massachusetts. He was then ordained priest on March 26, 1917, by Bishop Thomas Frederick Davies Jr. of Western Massachusetts in All Saints' Church. He married Arline Leicester Wagner on September 7, 1918, and together they had three children. Between 1918 and 1919, he served as chaplain in the US Army, until he became rector of All Saints' Church in Riverside, California. In 1925, he became rector of Christ Church in Mobile, Alabama, where he remained till 1939.

== Bishop ==
In 1938, Kirchhoffer was elected Coadjutor Bishop of Indianapolis. He was consecrated on February 8, 1939, with Presiding Bishop Henry St. George Tucker as chief consecrator. He succeeded as diocesan bishop five days later, on February 13, upon the death of Bishop Francis. Kirchhoffer remained in office till his retirement in 1959. After retirement he moved to Sonoma, California where he died on May 31, 1977.
