= Catherine Waynick =

American Anglican bishop (1948–2025)

The Right Reverend Catherine Waynick D.D.
- Bishop of Indianapolis
- Church: Episcopal Church
- Diocese: Indianapolis
- In office: 1997–2017
- Predecessor: Edward W. Jones
- Successor: Jennifer Baskerville-Burrows
- Other post: Provisional Bishop of Eastern Michigan (2017–2019)
- Previous post: Coadjutor Bishop of Indianapolis (1997)

Orders
- Ordination: 1986
- Consecration: June 7, 1997 by Arthur Benjamin Williams Jr.

Personal details
- Born: November 13, 1948 Michigan, U.S.
- Died: October 30, 2025 (aged 76)
- Denomination: Anglican
- Spouse: Larry Waynick (1968)
- Children: 2

Catherine Elizabeth Maples Waynick (November 13, 1948 – October 30, 2025) was an American Anglican bishop. She was the 10th bishop of the Episcopal Diocese of Indianapolis from 1997 to 2017. She was elected bishop coadjutor of the Episcopal Diocese of Indianapolis in January 1997, was consecrated on June 7 of that year, and became the diocesan bishop on September 10, 1997. She succeeded Edward W. Jones, who served from 1977 to 1997. At the 2015 diocesan convention, Waynick announced plans to retire, and called for the election of a new bishop to be consecrated in 2017. She was succeeded by Jennifer Baskerville-Burrows on April 29, 2017. Waynick was called to serve as provisional bishop for the Episcopal Diocese of Eastern Michigan on October 21, 2017, serving until October 19, 2019.

== Biography ==
Waynick was born on November 13, 1948. She attended Central Michigan University from 1966 to 1968. In 1981 she earned a BA in religious studies from Madonna College. She attended St. John's Provincial Seminary in Plymouth, Michigan, earning her Master of Divinity degree in 1985. She began work on a Doctor of Ministry degree at the Ecumenical Theological Seminary in Detroit, concentrating on the field of spiritual direction, and was granted an honorary Doctor of Divinity degree in May 1998 from the General Theological Seminary in New York City.

She was married to Larry Wade Waynick, a retired elementary school principal. They had two married children. Catherine Waynick died on October 30, 2025, at the age of 76.
