= William Edward Augustin Aikin =

American chemist and natural scientist

William Edward Augustin Aikin (6 February 1807 – 31 May 1888), known professionally as William E. A. Aikin, was an American analytical chemist and natural scientist. He was chair of the chemistry department at the University of Maryland from 1837 to 1883. While most of his work focused on chemistry, he held accomplishments in other fields in the natural sciences.

== Early years, education, and personal life ==
Aikin was born in Rensselaer County, New York on February 6, 1807. He graduated from the Rensselaer Institute in 1829 and shortly thereafter earned a license from the New York State Medical Society. Aikin married twice and had 28 children. He outlived both wives and all but three of his children.

== Academic career ==
Despite completing his training and earning an honorary M.D. degree from the Vermont Academy of Medicine, Aikin turned away from the medical profession and took a position in 1833 teaching natural sciences at the Western Female Collegiate Institute in Pittsburgh. In Baltimore, he became an associate professor teaching chemistry and pharmacy at the University of Maryland for one year until he was elected chair of the chemistry department in October 1837. He filled that role until his withdrawal as Emeritus Professor in 1883.

He was Dean of the School of Medicine at the university from 1840–1841 and from 1844 to 1855. Other positions he held included Professor of Natural Philosophy in the School of Arts and Sciences at the University of Maryland, Lecturer at the Maryland Institute, and Professor of Physics, Chemistry, and Natural Philosophy at Mount Saint Mary's College in Emmitsburg.

== Other accomplishments ==
- Aikin held an interest in a broad range of sciences. A colleague said of him:
  If you want a pretty good practical mathematician, one of the best botanists in America, an experimental chemist, of the first order, a very superior Geologist, Mineralogist, and Zoologist, you have him in Dr. William Aikin.
- In 1837, Aikin published a catalog of botanical specimens he studied in the Baltimore area.
- Aikin was appointed assistant geologist on The Geological Survey of Virginia from June 1, 1837, to April 13, 1839.
- In 1839, Aikin was appointed Governor of the Baltimore Infirmary.
- Aikin experimented with photography and published some of his findings in 1840.
- Aikin served as an expert witness in the murder trials of Nancy W. Hufford in 1851, Dr. Paul Schoeppe in 1872, and Elizabeth G. Wharton in 1873.
- From about 1868 until 1888, Aikin served as Baltimore's Inspector of Gas and Illuminating Oils.
- After Aikin's death, a steam-powered automobile was discovered in his office at The University of Maryland. The car was built in 1882 and credited to Aikin; he may have built it with his son, Albert, a civil engineer who wrote a thesis on steam machinery and, at the time, lived with his father in Baltimore.

== Publications ==
- Aikin, William E. A. (1834). "Some Notices of the Geology of the Country between Baltimore and the Ohio River, with a Section illustrating the Superposition of the Rocks". American Journal of Science. 26 (2): 219–232.
- Aikin, William E. A. (1837). Catalogue of phænogamous plants and ferns, native or naturalized, growing in the vicinity of Baltimore, Maryland. Baltimore: n.p. OCLC 10918705.
- Aikin, William E. A. (1837). "Death from the careless use of a hair dye". American Journal of Pharmacy. 32: 313–315.
- Aikin, William E. A. (1837). "On some supposed fallacies in determining the presence of tartar emetic". The Richmond and Louisville Medical Journal. 15: 7–13.
- Aikin, William E. A. (1840). Notice of the daguerreotype. Baltimore: J. Murphy. OCLC 8774397.
- Aikin, William E. A.; Dunglison, Robley (1840). An introductory lecture : delivered before the medical class of the University of Maryland, September, 1840. Baltimore: J. Murphy. OCLC 33077305.
- Aikin, William E. A. (1841). Address delivered before the Philomathian Society of Mount St. Mary's College, near Emmittsburg, Maryland, at the annual commencement, June 30th, 1841, by Wm. E. A. Aikin. Baltimore: John Murphy. OCLC 16120550.
- Aikin, William E. A. (1842). Report of a geological examination of some tracts of land in Allegany country, Md. and Hampshire Country, Va., belonging to the estate of the late Robert Oliver, esq. Baltimore: John D. Toy. OCLC 250281572.
- Aikin, William E. A. (1859). On the causes of the variable illuminating power of coal-gas: Proceedings of the American Association for the Advancement of Science. Twelfth Meeting, Held at Baltimore, Maryland, May, 1858. Cambridge: Joseph Lovering. pp. 133–138.
- Aikin, William E. A. (1859). On the variable illuminating power of coal gas. The American Journal of Science and Arts, Second Series, 27(79), 82–86.
- Aikin, William E. A. (1873). A review of "Prof. Resse's Review" of the Wharton trial : with a brief notice of the Schoeppe trial (PDF). New York: D. Appleton. OCLC 495281116.
