= Riverside Historic District (Evansville, Indiana) =

Historic district in Indiana, United States

- U.S. National Register of Historic Places
- U.S. Historic district
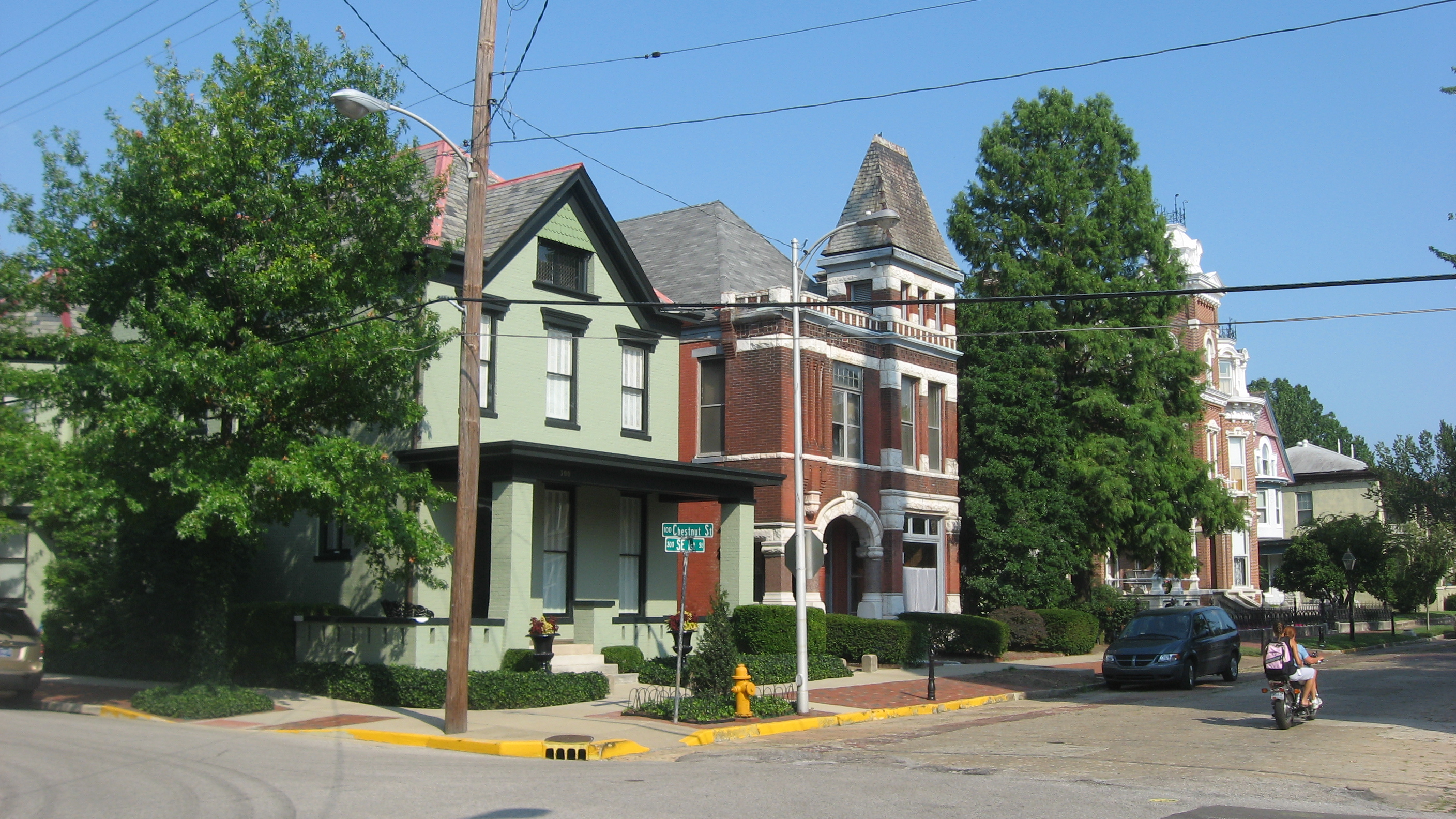
- First Street in the district

- Location within Indiana Location within the United States
- Location: Roughly bounded by Southlane Dr., Walnut, 3rd., and Parrett Sts., Evansville, Indiana
- Coordinates: 37°57′50″N 87°34′10″W
- Area: 102 acres (41 ha)
- Architect: Multiple
- Architectural style: Mixed (more Than 2 Styles From Different Periods)
- NRHP reference No.: 78000059
- Added to NRHP: November 14, 1978

The Riverside Historic District is a U.S. historic district located in downtown Evansville, Indiana. It was added to the register in 1978 and roughly bounded by Southlane Drive, Walnut, Third, and Parrett Streets. It consists of 1,010 acres (4.1 km^{2}) and 425 buildings. It is also known as the Riverside Neighborhood.

Located in the heart of the historic district is the Reitz Home Museum. It was built in 1871 and is noted as one of the finest examples of French Second Empire architecture in the United States. Other notable buildings are in the Italianate, Colonial Revival, and Renaissance Revival styles and include the Viele-Koch House (1856, c. 1872–1873), John Morford Stockwell House, Garvin House (c. 1860), St. Paul's Episcopal Church (1886), Nisbet House (1878), Sonntag-Bayard House (1863), Bosse House (1916), Duke House (1892), First Presbyterian Church (1873), Zurstadt House (c. 1853).

It was added to the National Register of Historic Places in 1978.
