= Reitz Home Museum =

Historic house in Indiana, United States

- John Augustus Reitz House
- U.S. National Register of Historic Places

- Location within Indiana Location within the United States
- Interactive map showing the location of John Augustus Reitz House
- Location: 224 S.E. 1st St., Evansville, Indiana
- Coordinates: 37°58′3.39″N 87°34′20.69″W
- Area: 0.5 acres (0.20 ha)
- Built: 1871
- Architectural style: Second Empire
- NRHP reference No.: 73000047
- Added to NRHP: October 15, 1973

The Reitz Home Museum is a Victorian house museum located in the Riverside Historic District in downtown Evansville, Indiana. The museum offers year-round guided tours.

An authentic restoration offers visitors a step back in time with silk damask-covered walls, hand painted ceilings, delicately molded plaster friezes, and intricately patterned hand-laid wood parquet floors. Other features of the home include tiled and marbled fireplaces, stained glass windows, and French gilt chandeliers. Much of the home is decorated with original period furniture.

Considered by many to be one of the finest examples of the French Second Empire style architecture, the home has been featured in several issues of Victorian Homes magazine as well as Victorian Decorating and Lifestyle magazine.

In 2003 the home received a commendation from the Victorian Society in America for the preservation and restoration of the Victorian mansion.

== History ==
John Augustus Reitz, who amassed a fortune in the lumber business, built the house in 1871 in the French Second Empire style. Built to express his success, the mansion was decorated with elegant furnishings and detailed architectural features. Upon Reitz's death in the 1890s, his eldest son Francis Joseph Reitz took over the house and completely redecorated the interior in a variety of Victorian styles.

In 1974 the Diocese of Evansville donated the mansion to the Reitz Home Preservation Society, a non-profit organization formed to restore and preserve the home. It was officially placed on the National Register of Historic Places in 1973 and was opened for public tours a year later. Joseph Lutz is currently the museum's executive director, as of July 2025.
