= George Upfold =

First Episcopal Bishop of Indiana

The Right Reverend George Upfold M.D., D.D., LL.D.
- Bishop of Indiana
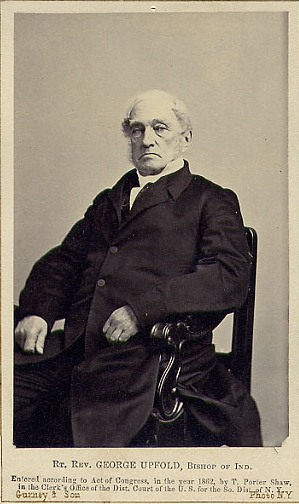
- Bishop George Upfold in 1862
- Church: Episcopal Church
- Diocese: Indiana
- Elected: June 29, 1849
- In office: 1849–1872
- Predecessor: Jackson Kemper
- Successor: Joseph C. Talbot

Orders
- Ordination: July 13, 1820 by John Henry Hobart
- Consecration: December 16, 1849 by Benjamin B. Smith

Personal details
- Born: May 7, 1796 Guildford, Surrey, England
- Died: August 26, 1872 (aged 76) Indianapolis, Indiana, United States
- Buried: Crown Hill Cemetery and Arboretum, Section 14, Lot 69
- Denomination: Anglican
- Parents: George Upfold & Mary Cheasmor
- Spouse: Sarah Sophia Graves
- Children: 2

George Upfold (May 7, 1796 – August 26, 1872) was the first Episcopal Bishop of Indiana after the diocese' division from the Missionary Diocese of the Northwest. He is officially styled, though, as II bishop of Indiana since missionary bishop Jackson Kemper is styled I bishop of Indiana.

== Early life ==
Upfold was born in Shenely Green, Surrey, England, and emigrated to the United States with his parents at the age of six. The family settled in Albany, New York. He earned his bachelor's degree from Union College in 1814. Initially intending to enter the medical profession, he earned a medical doctorate from the College of Physicians and Surgeons in New York City in 1816. Two years later, Upfold abandoned his medical career took up theology. He was assigned to be deacon at Trinity Church in Lansingburg, New York in October 1818. While there, he was ordained a priest on July 13, 1820. He was appointed rector of Church of St. Luke in the Fields, New York, about 1823. Upfold was then elected rector of St. Thomas's Church, New York, until 1831 when he moved to Pennsylvania to become the rector of Trinity Church in Pittsburgh. He remained at Trinity until 1849.

== Bishop of Indiana ==
In December 1849, Upfold was elected Bishop of Indiana. He was the 50th bishop in the ECUSA, and was consecrated on December 16, 1849, by Bishops Benjamin Bosworth Smith, Charles Pettit McIlvaine, and Jackson Kemper. While bishop, Upfold also served as rector for St. John's Church in Lafayette, Indiana and Christ Church Cathedral in Indianapolis. By 1855, the Diocese of Indiana had built is status and stability to the point that it could financially support the office of bishop, allowing Upfold to concentrate only on his duties as bishop. Upfold received a LL.D. degree from the Western University of Pennsylvania in 1856. In 1857 he moved the seat of the Diocese to Indianapolis where he remained in office until 1872. He served as the sole bishop until 1865 when, crippled by gout, he arranged for the election of a coadjutor bishop.

He died in 1872 and is buried at Crown Hill Cemetery, Indianapolis.

== Family ==
Upfold married Sarah Sophia Graves (1785–1880) in 1817. They had two daughters: Sophia Bicker Upfold, who later married Joseph J. Bingham, editor of the Indiana Daily Sentinel; and Emily L. Upfold, who became the librarian of the Diocese of Indiana.

== Notes ==
- Bingham, Brig. Gen. Theodore A. (1927). The Bingham family in the United States. Eatson, Pa.: The Bingham Association.
- Johnson, Rossiter (1904). The Twentieth Century Biographical Dictionary of Notable Americans. Vol. X. Boston: The Biographical Society.
- Lossing, Benson J. (1872). The American Historical Record. Vol. 1. Philadelphia: Chase & Town.
