= Joseph Marshall Francis =

The Right Reverend Joseph Marshall Francis D.D.
- Bishop of Indianapolis
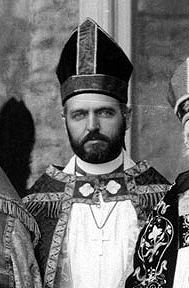
- Church: Episcopal Church
- Diocese: Indianapolis
- Elected: June 1899
- In office: 1899–1939
- Predecessor: John Hazen White
- Successor: Richard A. Kirchhoffer

Orders
- Ordination: December 19, 1886 by Edward R. Welles
- Consecration: September 21, 1899 by William Edward McLaren

Personal details
- Born: April 6, 1862 Eagles Mere, Pennsylvania, United States
- Died: February 13, 1939 (aged 76) Indianapolis, Indiana, United States
- Buried: Crown Hill Cemetery
- Denomination: Anglican
- Parents: James Booth Francis & Charlotte Augusta Marshall
- Spouse: Kate Stevens

Joseph Marshall Francis (April 6, 1862 – February 13, 1939) was an American Episcopal bishop. He was the sixth Bishop of Indiana in The Episcopal Church.

== Early life and education ==
Francis was born on April 6, 1862, in Eagles Mere, Pennsylvania, the son of James Booth Francis and Charlotte Augusta Marshall. His mother was descended from Chief Justice John Marshall. He was educated at the Episcopal Academy, before studying at Racine College from where he earned his Bachelor of Arts in 1883. He then studied for the priesthood at Nashotah House and graduated with a Bachelor of Divinity. He also did some postgraduate studies at the University of Oxford in England in 1885. He was awarded a Doctor of Divinity from Nashotah House in 1899 and from Hobart College in 1901.

== Ordained ministry ==
Francis was ordained deacon on December 21, 1884, and to the priesthood on December 19, 1886, in All Saints' Cathedral in Milwaukee, by Bishop Edward R. Welles. He married Kate Stevens on June 14, 1887, and had no children. Between 1884 and 1885, he served as pastor of Milwaukee and Greenfield, and between 1886 and 1887, as a canon of Cathedral of Milwaukee. In 1887 he became rector of St Luke's Church in Whitewater, Wisconsin, before leaving for Japan to serve as a missionary. Whilst there, he was Priest-in-Charge of St Andrew's Cathedral in Tokyo and Professor at Trinity Divinity School. In 1897, he returned to the United States and became rector of St Paul's Church in Evansville, Indiana in 1898.

== Bishop ==
In June 1899, Francis was elected as Bishop of Indiana during the Diocesan Convention. He was consecrated by the Bishop of Chicago William Edward McLaren on September 21, 1899. During his episcopacy, on September 1, 1902, the name of the diocese was changed to Indianapolis. During WWI, he enlisted as a chaplain with the US Army and served as chaplain of Base Hospital #32 in France from 1917 till 1918. He died in office in Indianapolis on February 13, 1939.
