= Episcopal Diocese of Indianapolis =

Episcopal Church diocese in the US

Diocese of Indianapolis Diœcesis Indianapolis

Location
- Country: United States
- Territory: Southern two-thirds of Indiana
- Ecclesiastical province: Province V

Statistics
- Congregations: 47 (2025)
- Members: 7,408 (2025)

Information
- Denomination: Episcopal Church
- Established: 1849 (As Diocese of Indiana); September 1, 1902 (As Diocese of Indianapolis)
- Cathedral: Christ Church Cathedral
- Language: English, Spanish

Current leadership
- Bishop: Jennifer Baskerville-Burrows

Map
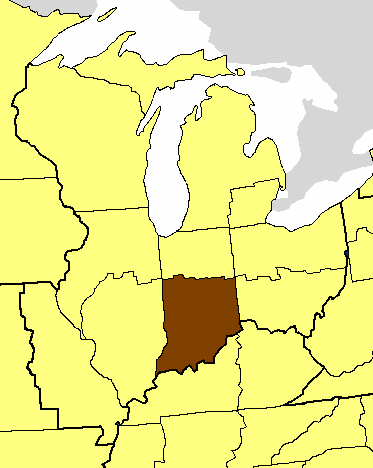
- Location of the Diocese of Indianapolis

Website
- www.indydio.org

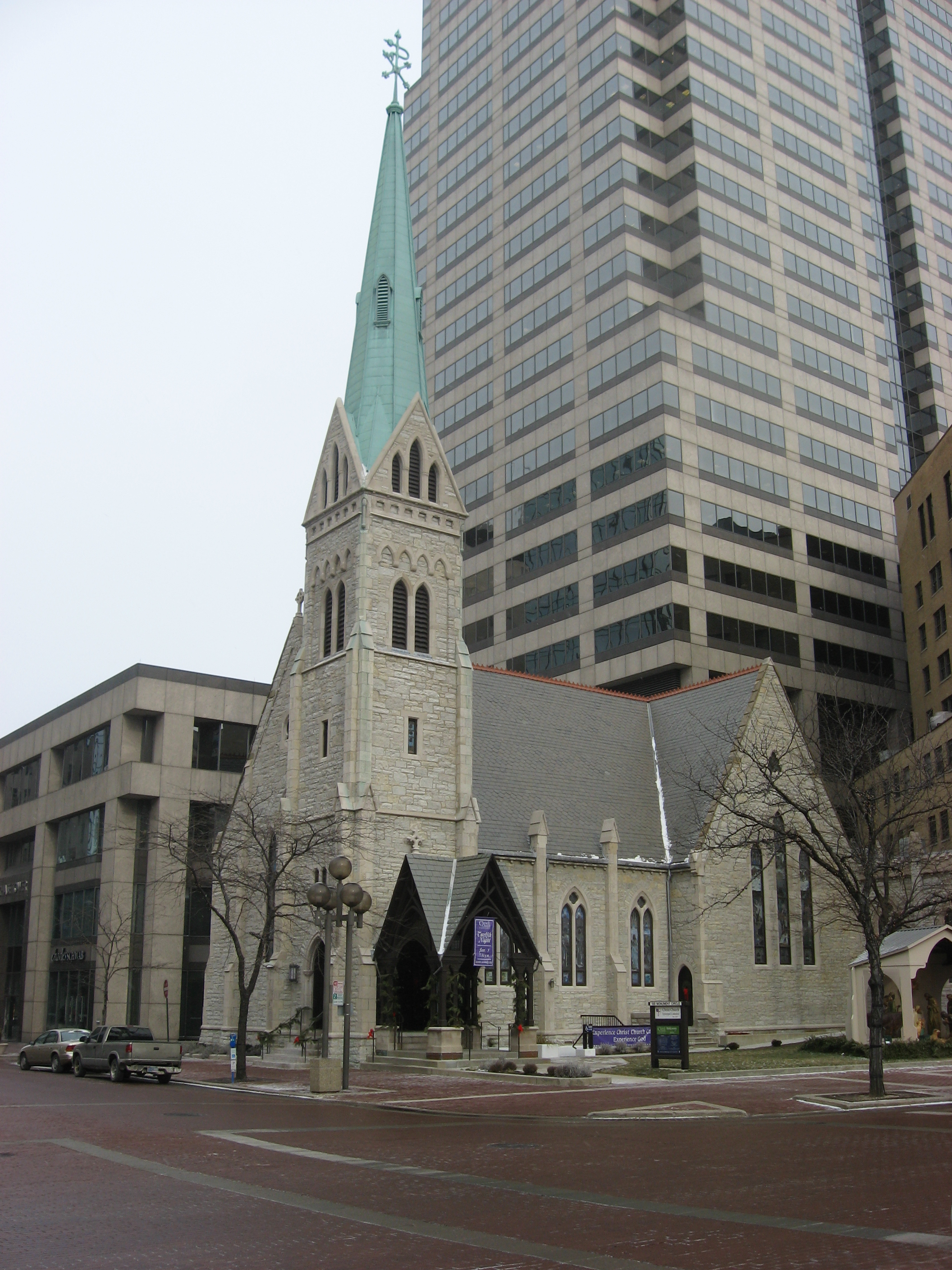
Christ Church Cathedral with the Chase Tower in the background.

The Episcopal Diocese of Indianapolis, formerly known as the Episcopal Diocese of Indiana, is a diocese in Province V (for the Midwest region) of the Episcopal Church. It encompasses the southern two-thirds of the state of Indiana. Its see is in Indianapolis, Indiana, at Christ Church Cathedral. According to the diocesan newsletter, the diocese has 10,137 communicants in 49 parishes. The current bishop is Jennifer Baskerville-Burrows, the first African-American woman to serve as diocesan bishop in the Episcopal Church and the first woman to succeed another woman as a diocesan bishop in the Episcopal Church; Catherine Waynick served as bishop of the diocese from 1997 to 2017.

The diocese reported 9,336 members in 2015 and 7,408 members in 2025. Plate and pledge income for the 47 filing congregations of the diocese in 2025 was $8,706,387. Average Sunday attendance (ASA) in 2025 was 2,831 persons, a decrease from the reported 3,664 in 2016.

== History ==
Like many of the Episcopal dioceses in the Midwest, the history of the Diocese of Indianapolis begins with the consecration of Jackson Kemper as Missionary Bishop of the Northwest in 1835. At the time, Indiana was a wilderness and the first Anglican meetings were often held in Methodist and Presbyterian churches, as well as courthouses, stores, schoolhouses and private homes. Kemper founded several Indiana churches; the oldest one still standing is Saint John's Church in Crawfordsville, Indiana.

The Episcopal Diocese of Indiana was formed in 1849 with the consecration of George Upfold as bishop of Indiana. The first cathedral was Saint John's Church in Lafayette, Indiana, because it was the only parish with a parsonage at the time. Within a few years, Upfold moved the episcopal residence to Indianapolis. Saint Paul's Church, Grace Church, and All Saints' Church served as the cathedral before it was moved to Christ Church in 1954. Christ Church was consecrated as the pro-cathedral for the diocese on October 10, 1954.

In 1898 the Episcopal Diocese of Indiana was divided to create the Episcopal Diocese of Indianapolis, covering the southern two-thirds of the state, and the Episcopal Diocese of Northern Indiana, covering the northern one-third.

== Churches in the Diocese ==
The Episcopal Diocese of Indianapolis is made up of 47 parishes across the lower two-thirds of the state of Indiana:

- All Saints Episcopal Church, Indianapolis, Indiana
- Chapel of the Good Shepherd, West Lafayette, Indiana
- Christ Church Cathedral, Indianapolis, Indiana
- Christ Episcopal Church, Madison, Indiana
- Church of the Nativity, Indianapolis, Indiana
- Good Samaritan Episcopal Church, Brownsburg, Indiana
- Grace Episcopal Church, Muncie, Indiana
- Holy Family Episcopal Church, Fishers, Indiana
- Peace Episcopal Church, Rockport, Indiana
- St. Andrew's Episcopal Church, Greencastle, Indiana
- St. Augustine Episcopal Church, Danville, Indiana
- St. Christopher's Episcopal Church, Carmel, Indiana
- St. David's Episcopal Church, Bean Blossom, Indiana
- St. Francis-in-the-Fields Church, Zionsville, Indiana
- St. George's Episcopal Church, West Terre Haute, Indiana
- St. James Episcopal Church, New Castle, Indiana
- St. James' Episcopal Church, Vincennes, Indiana
- St. John's Episcopal Church, Bedford, Indiana
- St. John's Episcopal Church, Crawfordsville, Indiana
- St. John's Episcopal Church, Lafayette, Indiana
- St. John's Episcopal Church, Mount Vernon, Indiana
- St. John's Episcopal Church, Speedway, Indiana
- St. John's Episcopal Church, Washington, Indiana
- St. Luke's Episcopal Church, Cannelton, Indiana
- St. Luke's Episcopal Church, Shelbyville, Indiana
- St. Mark's Episcopal Church, Plainfield, Indiana
- St. Mary's Episcopal Church, Martinsville, Indiana
- St. Matthew's Episcopal Church, Indianapolis, Indiana
- St. Michael's Episcopal Church, Noblesville, Indiana
- St. Paul's Episcopal Church, Columbus, Indiana
- St. Paul's Episcopal Church, Evansville, Indiana
- St. Paul's Episcopal Church, Indianapolis, Indiana
- St. Paul's Episcopal Church, Jeffersonville, Indiana
- St. Paul's Episcopal Church, New Albany, Indiana
- St. Paul's Episcopal Church, Richmond, Indiana
- St. Peter's Episcopal Church, Lebanon, Indiana
- St. Philip's Episcopal Church, Indianapolis, Indiana
- St. Stephen's Episcopal Church, New Harmony, Indiana
- St. Stephen's Episcopal Church, Terre Haute, Indiana
- St. Thomas Episcopal Church, Franklin, Indiana
- St. Timothy Episcopal Church, Indianapolis, Indiana
- The Table, Indianapolis, Indiana
- Trinity Episcopal Church, Anderson, Indiana
- Trinity Episcopal Church, Bloomington, Indiana
- Trinity Episcopal Church, Indianapolis, Indiana
- Trinity Episcopal Church, Lawrenceburg, Indiana

== Bishops of the Diocese ==
The bishops of the diocese in order are:

1. Jackson Kemper, I Indiana, (1838–1849)
2. George Upfold, II Indiana, (1849–1872)
3. Joseph Cruickshank Talbot, III Indiana, (1872–1883)
4. David Buel Knickerbacker, IV Indiana, (1883–1894)
5. John Hazen White, V Indiana, (1895–1899) Knickerbacker worked with the Episcopal General Convention to split the Diocese in two to better serve the growing congregation. The 1898 Episcopal General Convention agreed and split the Episcopal Diocese of Indianapolis from the Episcopal Diocese of Northern Indiana. White went on to head the new diocese from 1899 to 1925, while Joseph Marshall Francis ascended to become the sixth Bishop of Indiana.
6. Joseph Marshall Francis, VI Indianapolis, (1899–1939) The diocese was renamed from Indiana to Indianapolis on September 1, 1902.
7. Richard A. Kirchhoffer VII Indianapolis, (1939–1959)
8. John Pares Craine, VIII Indianapolis, (1959–1977)
9. Edward Witker Jones, IX Indianapolis, (1978–1997)
10. Catherine Maples Waynick, X Indianapolis, (1997–2017)
11. Jennifer Baskerville-Burrows, XI Indianapolis (2017–present)

== See also ==
- List of Episcopal bishops

== Resources ==
- Bodenhamer, David J., and Robert G. Barrows, eds. (1994). The Encyclopedia of Indianapolis. Bloomington and Indianapolis: Indiana University Press. pp. 413–414. ISBN 0-253-31222-1.
- Harvey, Jane C. History of Saint John's Church 1837-1887. from the website of St. John's Church, Lafayette.
- The History of Nine Urban Churches. Indianapolis, IN: The Riley-Lockerbie Ministerial Association of Downtown Indianapolis.
- Lilly, Eli, History of the Little Church on the Circle, Christ Church Parish, Indianapolis, 1837-1955 Indianapolis: Rector, Wardens, etc. of Christ Episcopal Church, 1957.
