= Jennifer Baskerville-Burrows =

American bishop

The Right Reverend Jennifer Baskerville-Burrows
- Bishop of Indianapolis
- Church: Episcopal Church
- Diocese: Indianapolis
- In office: April 30, 2017
- Predecessor: Catherine Waynick
- Other post: Director of Networking of the Episcopal Diocese of Chicago (January 2012-October 2016)

Orders
- Ordination: June 11, 1997 (deacon); February 7, 1998 (priest) by David B. Joslin
- Consecration: April 29, 2017 by Michael Bruce Curry

Personal details
- Born: Jennifer Lynn Baskerville New York, United States
- Denomination: The Episcopal Church
- Spouse: Harrison Burrows (m. 2003)
- Children: 1
- Education: Smith College; Cornell University; Church Divinity School of the Pacific

Jennifer Lynn Baskerville-Burrows is an American Anglican bishop. She is the bishop of the Diocese of Indianapolis in the Episcopal Church, elected in October 2016 and consecrated on April 29, 2017. She is the first African-American woman to be elected a diocesan bishop. Prior to her consecration, she served as Director of Networking in the Diocese of Chicago. Previously, she was a priest in the Episcopal Diocese of Central New York, the Episcopal Diocese of Newark, and the Episcopal Diocese of California. In addition to her parish ministry, she has been Director of Alumni and Church Relations at Church Divinity School of the Pacific and a chaplain to Syracuse University.

== Early life and education ==
Baskerville-Burrows was born and brought up in New York City. She was educated at Smith College, majoring in architecture with a minor in urban studies, and graduated in May 1988. In 1989, she was baptised in the Episcopal Church (United States) having spent her childhood and early adult years "seeking and longing for church community". She then studied Historic Preservation Planning at Cornell University, graduating with a Master of Arts (MA) degree in May 1994. She trained for ordained ministry at Church Divinity School of the Pacific, a seminary of the Episcopal Church, graduating with a Master of Divinity (M.Div.) degree in May 1997.

== Ordained ministry ==
Baskerville-Burrows was ordained in the Episcopal Church as a deacon on June 11, 1997, and as a priest on February 7, 1998, by the bishop of the Episcopal Diocese of Central New York. From June 1997 to April 1999, she served as Assistant Rector of St. Paul's Episcopal Church, Endicott, New York. Then, from April 1999 to August 2002, she was the Associate for Christian Formation at St. Peter's Episcopal Church, Morristown, New Jersey; her duties included leading adult Bible study classes, Baptismal preparation classes, and assisting in the parish ministries. On September 11, 2001, she was at Trinity Church, New York for a "videotaping event" with Archbishop Rowan Williams (then the head of the Church in Wales, and later the head of the Church of England). She described how "we spent hours in a stairwell of the parish house building expecting to die" but found peace in Jesus, God's grace, and the communion of saints.

From August 2002 to July 2004, Baskerville-Burrows served as a pastoral associate of All Saints' Episcopal Church, a progressive Anglo-Catholic church in San Francisco, California, and was Director of Alumni and Church Relations at Church Divinity School of the Pacific in Berkeley, California. From July 2004 to January 2012, she was Rector of Grace Episcopal Church in Syracuse, New York, and Episcopal Chaplain to Syracuse University. From January 2012, she was the Director of Networking in the Episcopal Diocese of Chicago.

=== Episcopal ministry ===
On October 28, 2016, Baskerville-Burrows was elected the 11th bishop diocesan of the Episcopal Diocese of Indianapolis. This made her the first African-American woman to be elected a diocesan bishop in the Episcopal Church. Baskerville-Burrows was consecrated a bishop on April 29, 2017, during a service at Clowes Memorial Hall, Butler University in Indianapolis, Indiana. She was then seated on April 30.

== Personal life ==
On March 22, 2003, the then Jennifer Baskerville married Harrison Burrows at St. Peter's Episcopal Church in Morristown, New Jersey. Together they have a son, Timothy.

== See also ==
- List of Episcopal bishops of the United States
- Historical list of the Episcopal bishops of the United States
