= Christ Church Cathedral (Indianapolis) =

Historic church in Indiana, United States

- The Cathedral Church of Christ
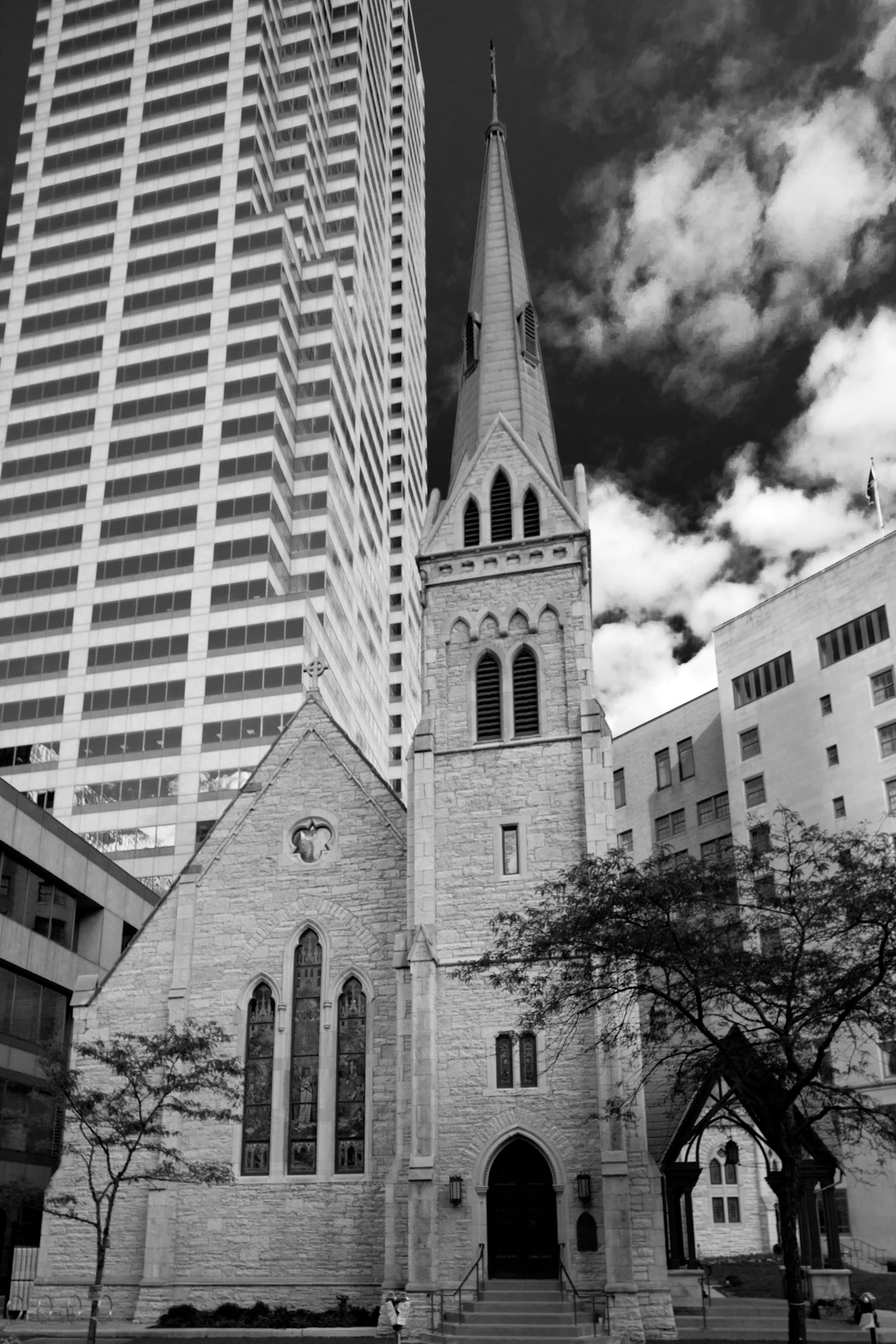
- Christ Church Cathedral in 2011
- Christ Church Cathedral
- Location: Indianapolis, Indiana, United States
- Country: United States
- Denomination: Episcopal Church
- Website: cccindy.org

History
- Founded: 1837

Architecture
- Architect: William Tinsley
- Style: English Gothic Revival
- Years built: 1857

Administration
- Diocese: Indianapolis

Clergy
- Bishop: Jennifer Baskerville-Burrows
- Rector: Gray Lesesne
- Dean: Gray Lesesne
- Christ Church Cathedral
- U.S. National Register of Historic Places
- U.S. Historic district – Contributing property
- Location within Indianapolis Location within Indianapolis Location within Indiana Location within the United States
- Coordinates: 39°46′9″N 86°9′27″W
- Area: 0.3 acres (0.12 ha)
- Built: 1857
- Architect: William Tinsley
- Architectural style: English Gothic Revival
- NRHP reference No.: 73000035
- Added to NRHP: July 10, 1973

Christ Church Cathedral is the cathedral for the Episcopal Diocese of Indianapolis in the U.S. state of Indiana. Christ Church parish was formally organized in 1837. The present-day church building was erected in 1857 on Monument Circle at the center of downtown Indianapolis to replace the parish's first church built on the same site. Designed by architect William Tinsley, the English Gothic Revival-style structure is the oldest church building in Indianapolis and Marion County that has remained in continuous use. It is also the oldest building on Monument Circle. Christ Church is known for its music, especially its pipe organs, one of which was donated by Ruth Lilly, and its Chancel Choir and Coro Latinoamericano. The parish is also known for its community service, including an annual strawberry festival fundraiser and other charitable work. Christ Church Cathedral was added to the National Register of Historic Places on July 10, 1973. It is located in the Washington Street-Monument Circle Historic District.

== History ==
Indianapolis's first Episcopalians were meeting in several locations during the 1820s and 1830s when Christ Church parish, the first Protestant Episcopal parish in Indianapolis, was formally organized on July 13, 1837.

=== First church building ===
In 1838, Christ Church parishioners purchased a lot on Governor's Circle, now known as Monument Circle, and began construction on its first church building. Its cornerstone was laid on May 7, 1838. Designed in a Gothic Revival style, the small, wood-frame church was painted white and measured 29 feet (8.8 m) by 43 feet (13 m). It included a simple portico and gallery that had a total seating capacity of 350 people. The first worship service in the new building was held on November 18, 1838. Episcopal Bishop Jackson Kemper consecrated the church on December 16, 1838. James B. Britton served as its first rector (1838–40).

Christ Church was one of five early churches located on the Circle in downtown Indianapolis, and it is the only church remaining on the Circle. When the first Christ Church building became outdated in the mid-1850s, its parishioners decided to replace it with a new church. In 1857, the city's Bethel AME Church congregation purchased the first Christ Church building and relocated it to Georgia Street, where it remained in use until it was destroyed by a fire in 1862.

=== Present-day church building ===
In 1857, the Christ Church parish erected its second church, the present-day Christ Church Cathedral, on the site of its first church. Located at 131 Monument Circle in the center of downtown Indianapolis, it is the oldest church building in Indianapolis and Marion County, Indiana, that has remained in continuous use. Christ Church is also the oldest building on Monument Circle.

Designed by Irish-born architect William Tinsley in an English Gothic Revival style, the church cost between $32,438 and $37,750 to build. Its cornerstone was laid on June 24, 1857, and the first worship service was held on May 22, 1859. A spire was added to the church's tower in 1869 at a cost of $1,425. Electric lights were installed in 1886. A new Episcopal residence was completed on the Circle in 1871, and a brick Sunday School building was completed in 1876. The parish considered relocating north of downtown Indianapolis in 1889 and deliberated over several similar options on several subsequent occasions, but each time the parishioners decided to remain on the Circle.

Over the years Christ Church underwent several renovations and refurbishments. In 1900, W. and J. Lamb architects of New York, with Vonnegut and Bohn of Indianapolis acting as supervising architects, renovated and redecorated the church at an approximate cost of $32,294. The architects deepened the chancel, added an exterior porch (lychgate), and designed a new parish house on the west end of the church. Another renovation took place in 1927, when the church's basement was excavated at a cost of $75,000 to create additional space underneath the building for educational and recreational use. Additional renovations took place in 1936. The church's interior and its parish house were refurbished in 1954 at an estimated cost of $300,000 to replace the redecoration made in 1900 because it was incongruent with the church's English Gothic architecture. The church underwent additional renovations in 1973. The church's nave and parish hall were renovated in 1983.

Christ Church was consecrated as the pro-cathedral for the Episcopal Diocese of Indianapolis on October 10, 1954. In the 1960s the church struggled through its dual role as a community parish and cathedral for the diocese, as well as its changing surroundings in downtown Indianapolis, but resolved to remain an active church in the community. Christ Church was recognized for its urban ministry in the 1960s under the leadership of Cathedral Dean Paul Moore Jr. Christ Church Cathedral was added to the National Register of Historic Places on July 10, 1973.

== Description ==
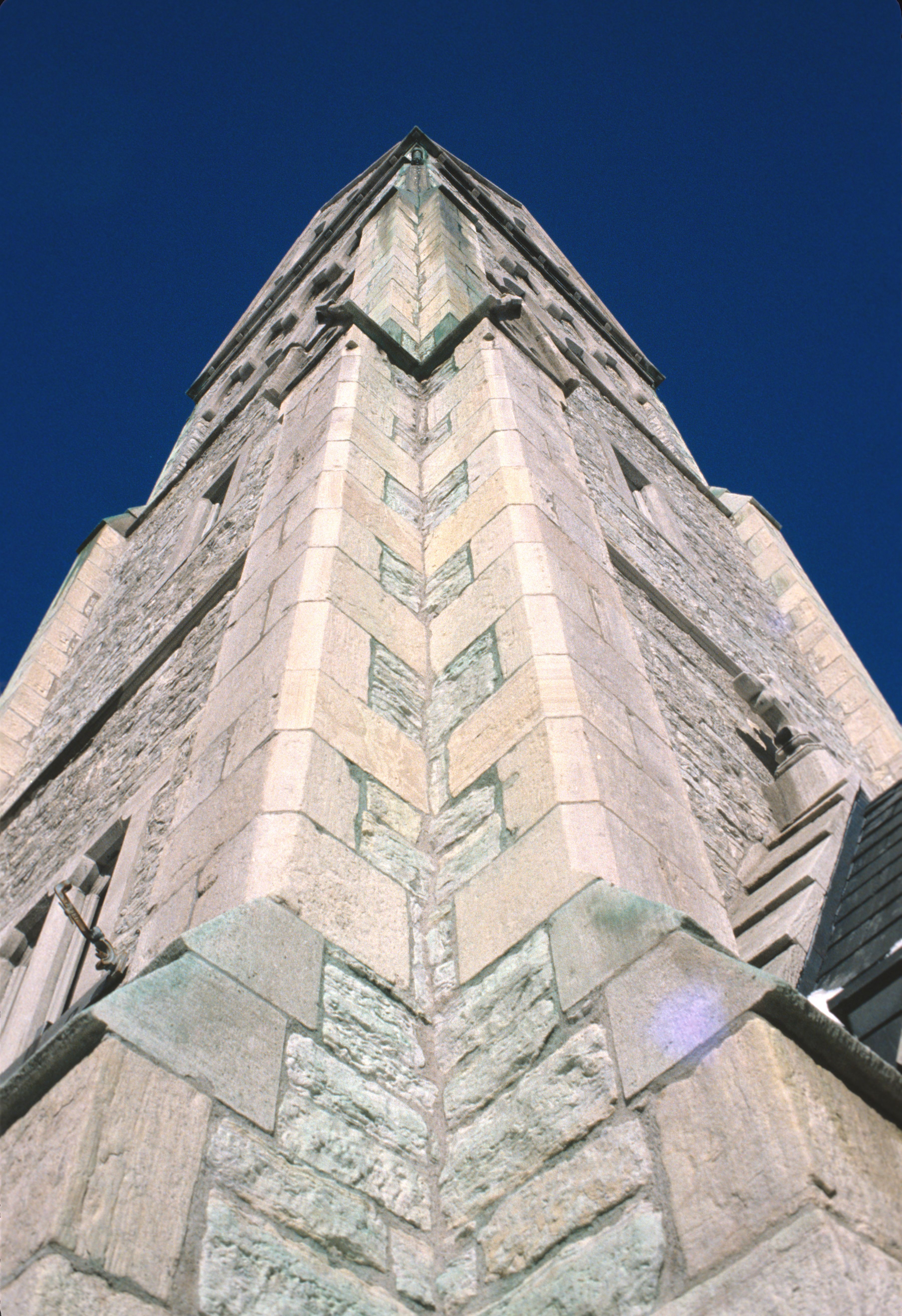
Christ Church Cathedral detail

=== Exterior and plan ===
William Tinley's early English Gothic-style design for Christ Church included a modified cruciform plan with the sanctuary in the east end and a main façade facing west. Its original red brick face was replaced with limestone. An octagonal spire capping the single tower on the southwest corner was added in 1869, ten years after the building's construction. The spire is crowned with a finial that included the letters Chi and Rho, the first two letters of the Greek word for Christ. The exterior also includes tall, Gothic Revival-style windows and a peaked roof. The main façade and both transept ends each have a set of three tall, narrow windows. Each of the gables on the front façade and transepts have bulls eye windows "with trefoil cusping". In 1900, the chancel was deepened to create a complete cruciform plan and an exterior porch (lychgate) was added to the church.

=== Interior ===
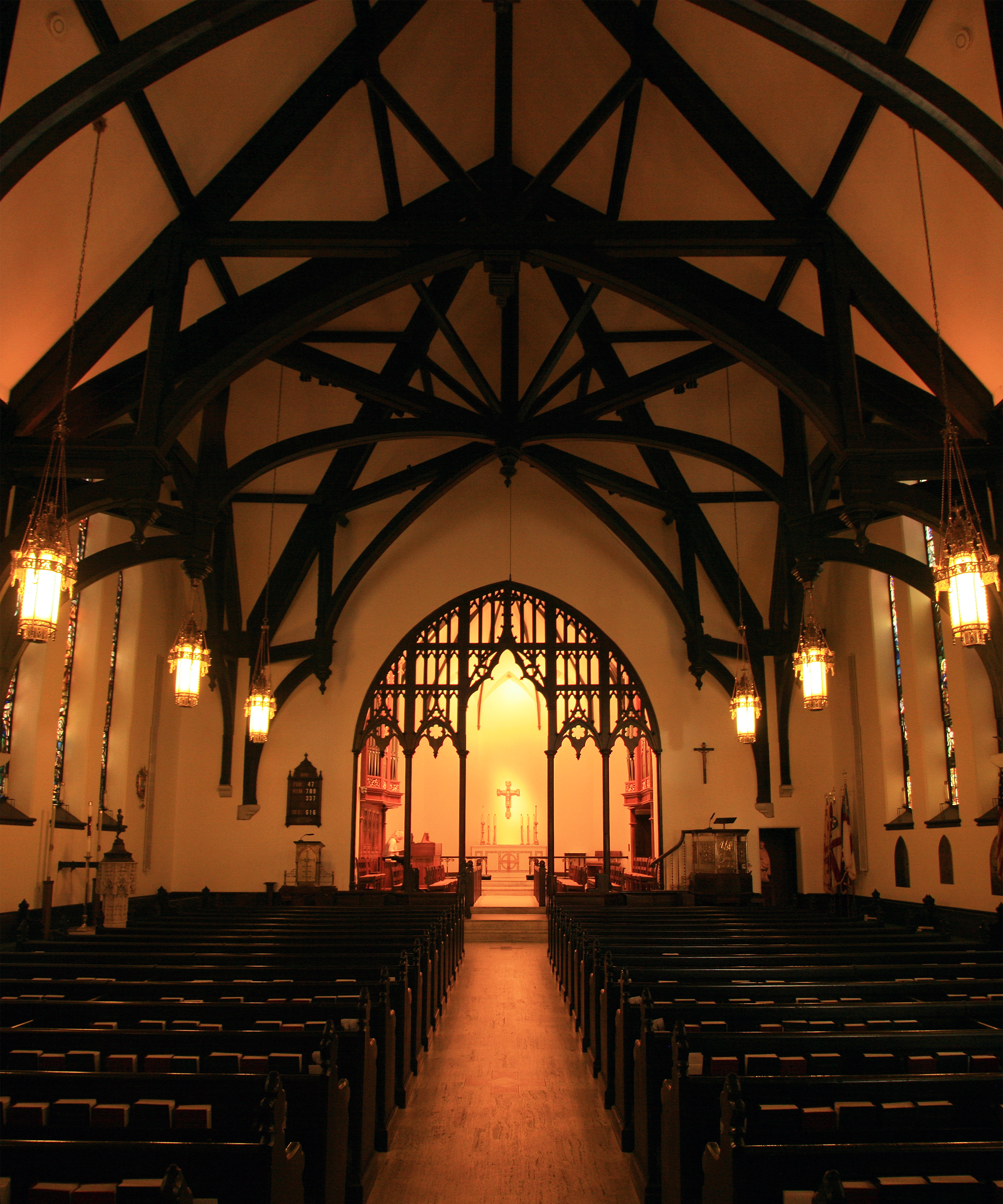
The church interior, looking east from the nave toward the altar

Although the original color of the interior walls is unknown, the beamed ceiling was originally painted light blue. Two panels above the altar included text from Sanctus. Central pews entered from the sides, but a middle aisle was added later. The church's choir loft was illuminated with leaded-glass windows to the north of the chancel.

Interior updates included the addition of a white marble altar in 1900. A wooden screen was installed to separate the chancel and the congregation. Memorials included a Resurrection stained-glass window in the west end of the nave, a church history window that included a series of three windows in the north transept, a white marble baptismal font, and a bronze statue of a young Saint John the Baptist by English sculptor John Angel. In 1954, the church's inner doors and chancel were painted red, a symbol of the Holy Spirit.

== Mission ==
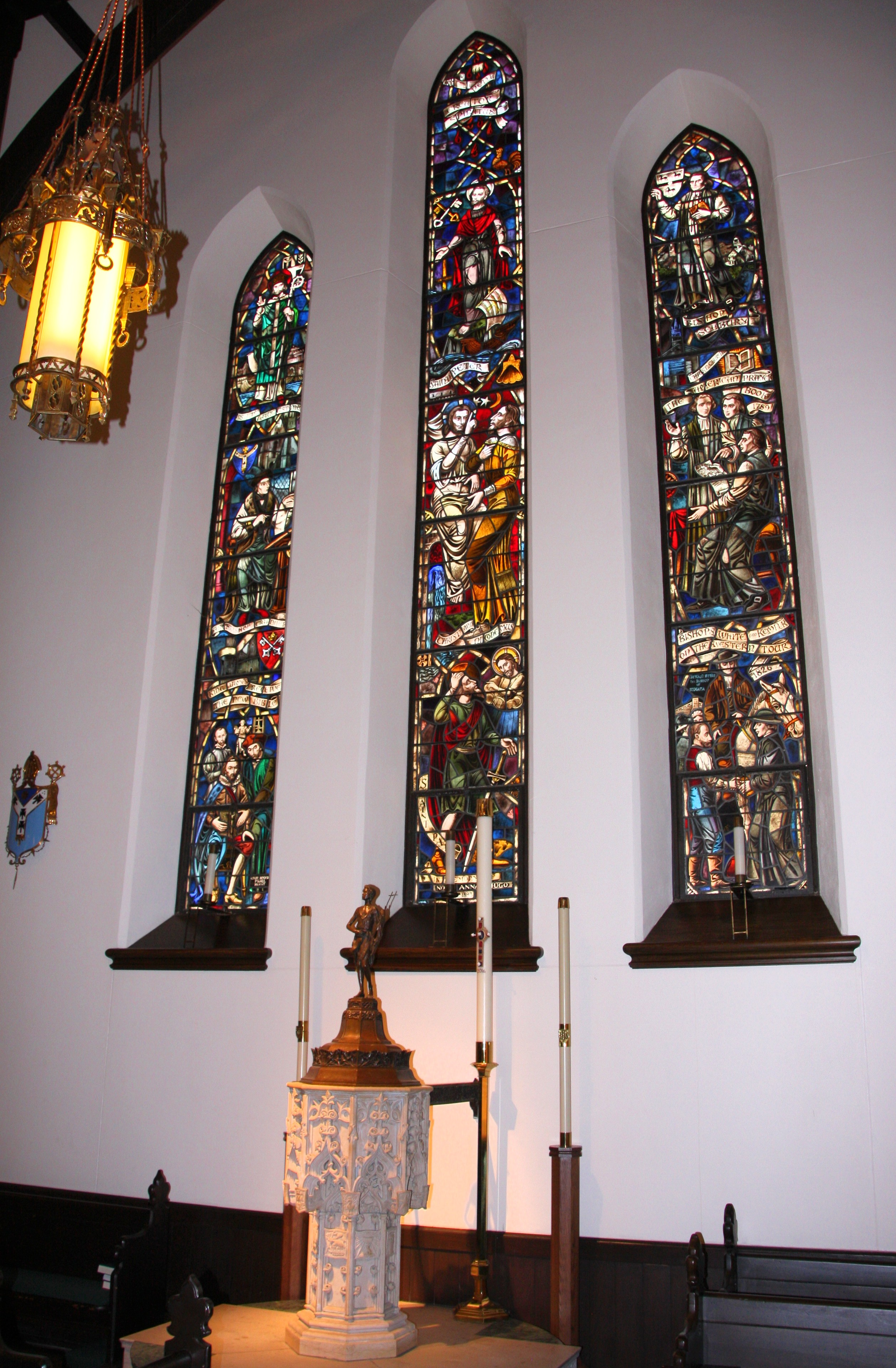
Baptismal font and windows depicting church history on the north side of the church

Christ Church parish retains a strong sense of stewardship and remains an active leader in the Indianapolis community. It is especially known for its community service and charitable work.

Due to Christ Church's central location in downtown Indianapolis, it became a hub of several charitable activities. During World War II and the Korean War it operated a canteen to feed and entertain thousands of military personnel. The parish is also the host of an annual strawberry festival. Christ Church parishioners held a strawberry festival as early as 1857 to raise funds for construction of the present-day church and held similar church benefits in 1863 and 1864, which marked the beginnings of the parish's successful annual fundraising event. Christ Church Cathedral has hosted a strawberry festival every summer since 1965, raising funds for local, national, and international charities. The festival was featured on the Food Network in 2007.

Christ Church was the mother church to several Episcopal missions and parishes in Indianapolis, including Saint Luke's, Grace, Saint Paul's, Saint George's, and Saint Philip's Episcopal churches. In 1839, Christ Church founded an early seminary for young women that was the predecessor to Saint Mary's Seminary, chartered by the Indiana General Assembly in 1844.

Christ Church parish has a companion relationship with the Cathedral of the Resurrection in Brasilia, Brazil. Locally, the congregation has strong partnerships with nonprofits such as Dayspring, Exodus Refugee Immigration, Voices of Indianapolis, among others. It held a special service after the 9/11 terrorist attacks and co-hosts an annual memorial service with the Coalition for Homelessness Intervention and Prevention for homeless persons who have died along with Roberts Park United Methodist Church.

== Music ==
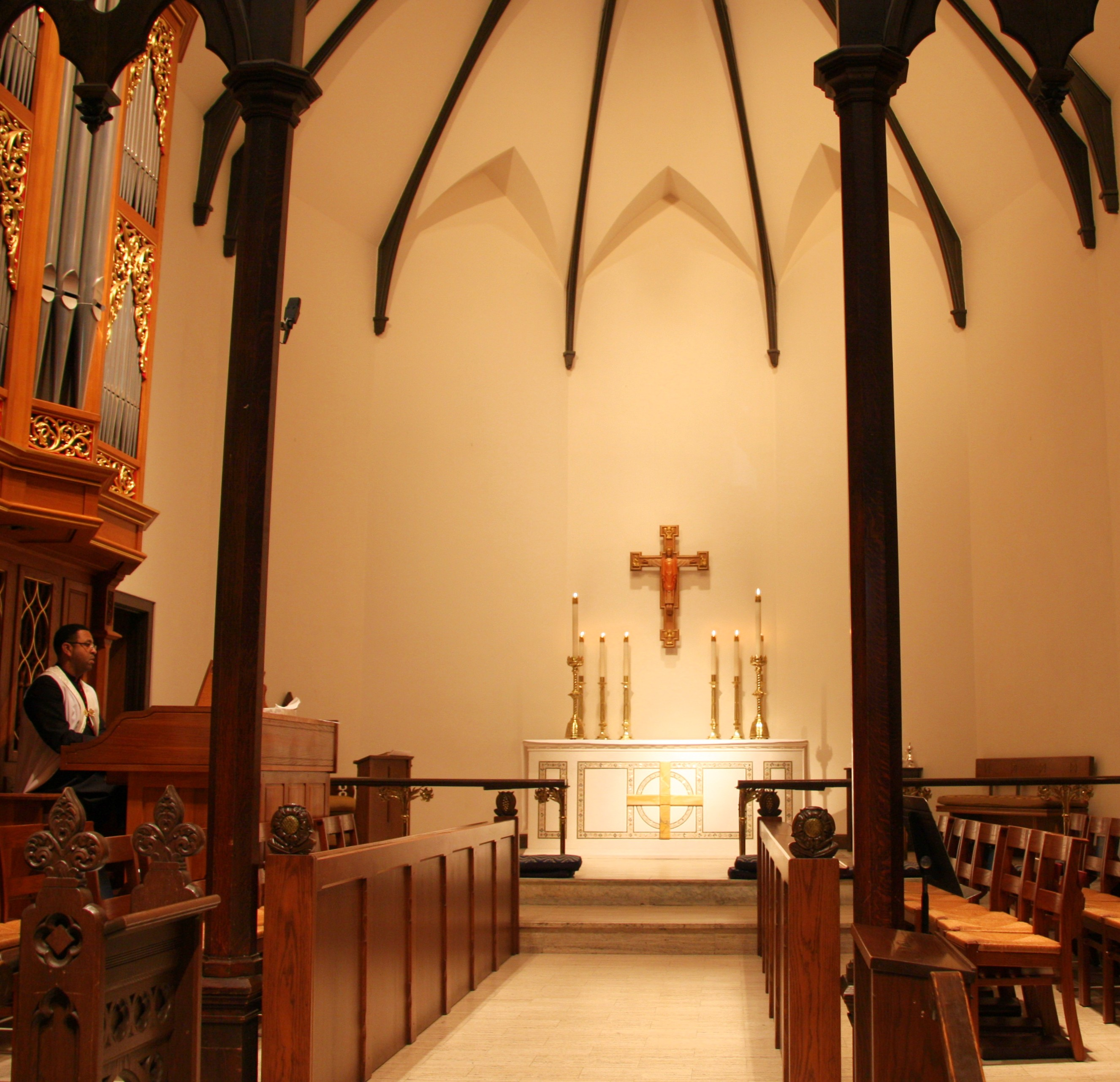
An organist playing near the altar

Since its founding in 1837, Christ Church Cathedral has maintained a strong tradition of liturgical music. In the 1880s, the cathedral established a Choir of Men and Boys, reflecting the influence of the Oxford Movement and its emphasis on Anglican choral practice. The choir became a fully professional ensemble by the mid-20th century, one of the few such choirs in Indiana. In the late 1930s, girls began attending rehearsals leading to the establishment of a Girls’ Choir in 1945.

For more than 100 years, the Choir of Men and Boys led music at the cathedral's 11:00 a.m. service, while the Girls' Choir sang at the 9:00 a.m. service.

In 2012 the two choirs were merged into a single ensemble that sings at the 10:00 a.m. liturgy.

In the early 2000s, the Cathedral introduced a 1:00 p.m. Sunday liturgy in Spanish and established the Coro Latinoamericano to lead music for Spanish-language services.

=== Choirmasters and directors of music ===
Christ Church choirmasters have included Cheston L. Heath (1926–1947), Robert Hobbs (1947–1964), James Litton (1964–1967), David Koehring (1967–1977), Frederick Burgomaster (1977–2009), Dana Marsh (2010–2014), Michael Boney (2014–2019), Christopher Caruso-Lynch (2019–2024), Stephen White (2024–2025), Michael Bennett (Co-Director, 2026-present) and Bruno Sandes (Co-Director, 2024–present).

=== Pipe organs and instruments ===
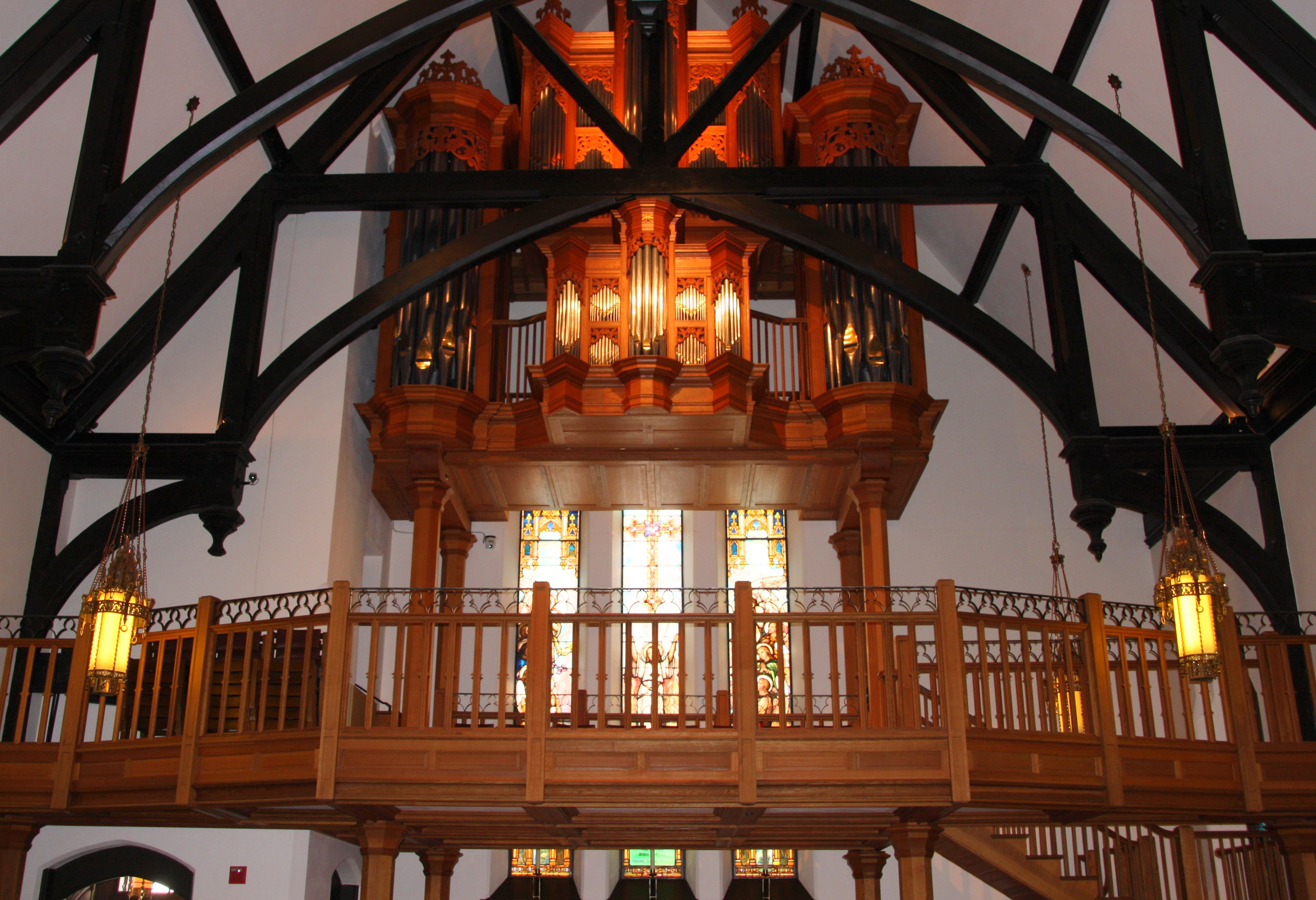
Organ loft at the west end of the church

The cathedral's Chancel organ was built in 1989 by Hellmuth Wolff. The Gallery organ, a gift of Ruth Lilly, was built in 1991 by Taylor and Boody Organbuilders of Staunton, Virginia. The church's continuo organ was built in 1996 by John Brombaugh. The cathedral also has a Model D Grand Piano built by Steinway & Sons in 2018.

== Membership ==
The parish organized with thirty individual members in 1837. By 1850 its membership rose to 153 adults and 108 children. In the mid-1860s, during the American Civil War years, its membership was approximately 250. By 1882 Christ Church was one of six Episcopal parishes in Indianapolis. In 1963 its communicants numbered 1,145, but membership declined to 572 by 1980. As of 2025, the congregation has 472 active members and an average Sunday attendance of approximately 267 people. Plate and pledge support for 2024 was $248,593.

=== Notable members ===
- Eli Lilly, Industrialist
- Andrea Hunley, State Senator

== See also ==
- List of the Episcopal cathedrals of the United States
- List of cathedrals in the United States
- National Register of Historic Places listings in Center Township, Marion County, Indiana
