= Robert Burton Gooden =

The Right Reverend Robert Burton Gooden
- Suffragan Bishop of Los Angeles
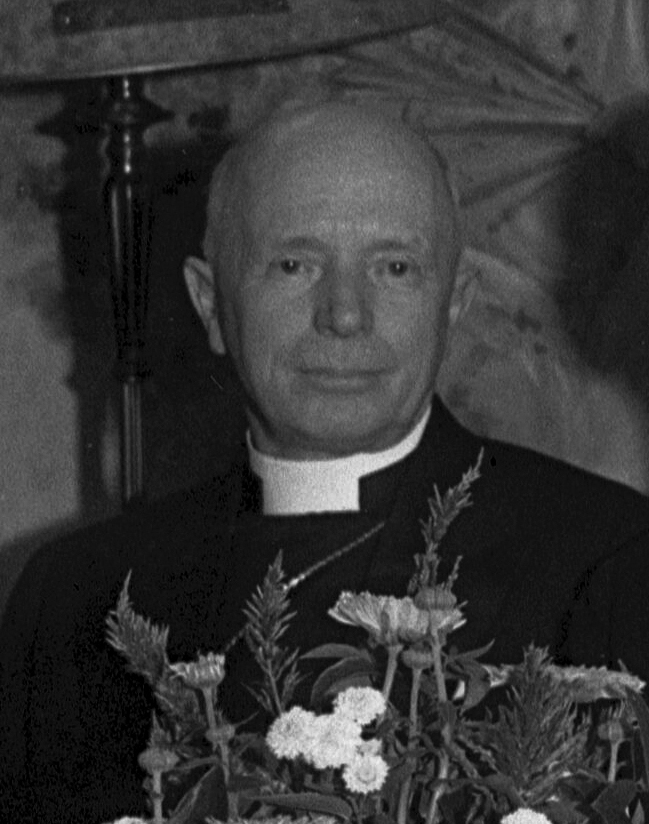
- Gooden in 1935
- Church: Episcopal Church
- Diocese: Los Angeles
- Elected: March 11, 1930
- In office: 1930-1947
- Successor: Donald J. Campbell

Orders
- Ordination: April 18, 1905 by Joseph Horsfall Johnson
- Consecration: May 27, 1930 by W. Bertrand Stevens

Personal details
- Born: September 18, 1874 Bolton, England
- Died: August 24, 1976 (aged 101) Los Angeles, California, United States
- Denomination: Anglicanism
- Parents: James Gooden & Hannah Burton
- Spouse: Alice Leonard Moore (m. 1904; died 1952)
- Children: 5

Robert Burton Gooden (September 18, 1874 – August 24, 1976) was a suffragan bishop in the Episcopal Diocese of Los Angeles.

== Early life and education ==
Gooden was born in Bolton, England on September 18, 1874 to James Gooden and Hannah Burton. He came to the United States in 1888 and attended the High School in Ventura, California. He studied at Trinity College from where he graduated with a Bachelor of Arts in 1902, a Master of Arts in 1904, and a Doctor of Divinity in 1922. He also studied at Berkeley Divinity School from where he earned a Bachelor of Divinity in 1904, and awarded a Doctor of Divinity in 1931. He also earned a Doctor of Canon Law in 1966 from Church Divinity School of the Pacific. He married Alice Leonard Moore on November 7, 1904 and together had five children.

== Ordained Ministry ==
Gooden was ordained deacon on June 8, 1904 by Bishop Chauncey B. Brewster of Connecticut in the Church of the Holy Trinity, Middletown, Connecticut, and priest on April 18, 1905 by Bishop Joseph Horsfall Johnson of Los Angeles in Trinity Episcopal Church, Santa Barbara, California. He was initially missionary at St Paul's Church in Ventura, California between 1904 and 1905 and then missionary priest at Trinity Church in Escondido, California and St John's Church in Fallbrook, California from 1905 until 1907. He then became rector of St Luke's Church in Long Beach, California between 1907 and 1912, before accepting the post of Headmaster at Harvard School in Los Angeles, a post he retained until 1930.

== Episcopacy and Later Years ==
On March 11, 1930, during a special convention at St Paul's Cathedral, Los Angeles, Gooden was elected as the first Suffragan Bishop of Los Angeles on the sixth ballot. He was consecrated on May 27, 1930 by Bishop W. Bertrand Stevens of Los Angeles in St Paul's Cathedral, Los Angeles. He retired in 1947.

He helped found the Gooden Center, a residential facility in Pasadena for recovery from alcohol and drug addiction. He was the oldest bishop in The Episcopal Church when he died at the age of 101. His son, Reginald Heber Gooden, was also a bishop.
