= Oliver B. Garver Jr. =

The Right Reverend Oliver B. Garver Jr.
- Suffragan Bishop of Los Angeles
- Church: Episcopal Church
- Diocese: Los Angeles
- Elected: 1985
- In office: 1985-1990
- Predecessor: Robert C. Rusack
- Successor: Chester Talton

Orders
- Ordination: 1963
- Consecration: May 25, 1985 by John Allin

Personal details
- Born: July 19, 1925 Los Angeles, California, United States
- Died: August 2, 1996 (aged 71) Westwood, California, United States
- Denomination: Anglicanism

Oliver Bailey Garver Jr. (July 19, 1925 - August 2, 1996) was an American civil rights activist and prelate of the Episcopal Church who served as suffragan bishop of the Episcopal Diocese of Los Angeles from 1985 to 1990.

== Early life and education ==
Garver was born in Los Angeles on July 19, 1925. He studied at the University of California, Los Angeles and graduated with a Bachelor of Science in 1945. He then served in the United States Navy Reserve between 1945 and 1946. He also earned a Master of Business Administration from Harvard University in 1948, and worked as a cost accounting manager for Lockheed Corporation until 1959. He then studied for thee priesthood at the Episcopal Theological School in Cambridge, Massachusetts, and earned a Bachelor of Sacred Theology in 1962. He was also awarded a Doctor of Divinity from the Church Divinity School of the Pacific in 1987.

== Ordained Ministry ==
Garver was ordained deacon in 1962 and priest in 1963. He served as assistant of St Alban's Church in Los Angeles and part time college chaplain at UCLA from 1962 to 1965, and then at the Church of the Epiphany in Los Angeles between 1966 and 1972. In 1973 he became canon to the ordinary in the Diocese of Los Angeles and retained the post until 1985.

== Bishop ==
In 1985 Garver was elected Suffragan Bishop of Los Angeles during a special convention of the Diocese of Los Angeles. He was then consecrated on May 25, 1985, at the Pauley Pavilion with Presiding Bishop John Allin as chief consecrator. He retired on June 30, 1990, to serve as chaplain of Harvard School in Studio City, Los Angeles.

== Activism and legacy ==
Garver was a civil rights activist and in 1965 marched with Martin Luther King Jr. in Selma, Alabama, and in 1968 denounced the arrests of Mexican American activists in Los Angeles. He was also instrumental in forming California’s refugee resettlement policy as chairman of the Governor’s Task Force on Refugee Affairs. He was a leading activist for people of different sexualities. He conferred Holy Order on Philip Lance, the first openly gay priest in The Episcopal Church, in January 1988. Lance's ordination was contested by members of the Commission on Ministry but Garver and Bishop Jon Bruno advocated for his approval. He was also a strong advocate for people with HIV and AIDS, and worked to establish the Bishop’s Commission on AIDS Ministries in 1985. The commission is still supporting the building of affordable housing for people with HIV and AIDS till this day.

== Death ==
Garver died on August 2, 1996, at his home in Westwood, California.
