= Antonio Gallardo (bishop) =

Venezuela-born American bishop (born 1967)

Antonio José Gallardo Lucena (Note: In this name that follows Hispanic American naming customs, the first or paternal surname is Gallardo and the second or maternal family name is Lucena.) (born June 1967) is a Venezuelan-born bishop in the Episcopal Church, currently serving as the 8th Bishop of Los Angeles.

== Early life and education ==
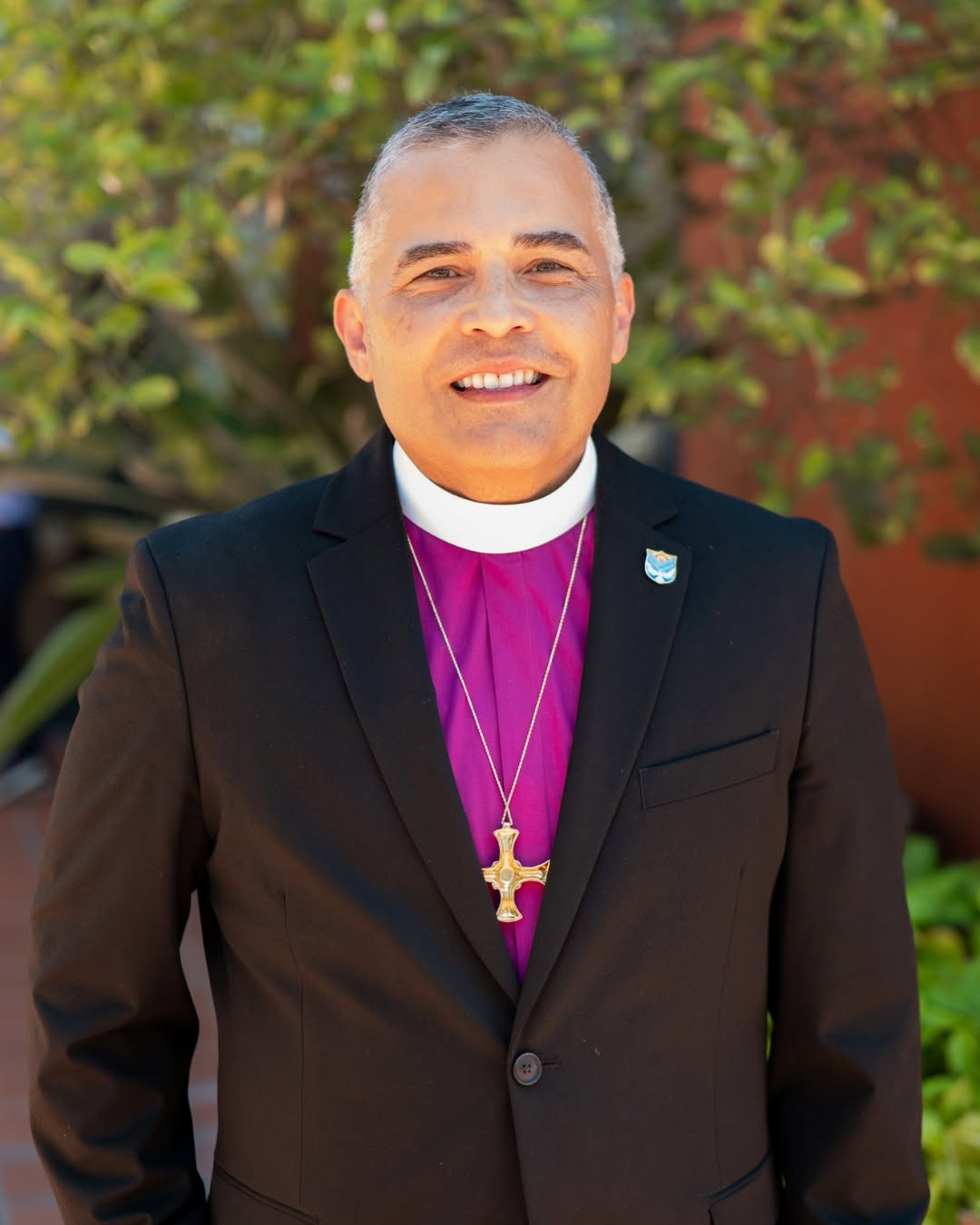
Antonio Gallardo Lucena.

Born in Barquisimeto, Venezuela, in June 1967, Gallard studied at the Universidad Experimental Politécnica Antonio José de Sucre and the Universidad Centroccidental Lisandro Alvarado in his native country before obtaining a doctorate in business and economics at Lehigh University in Bethlehem, Pennsylvania, in the United States. He later studied for ordination at Claremont School of Theology in Los Angeles, California. He is also an alumnus and trustee of Episcopal Divinity School.

== Career ==
From 1990 to 1993 Gallardo taught at the Universidad Centroccidental Lisandro Alvarado. From 2008 to 2015 he was a lecturer at California State Polytechnic University in Pomona and an instructor at the University of California, Los Angeles. He also worked for non-profits such as First 5 Los Angeles and the Farmworkers Institute of Education and Leadership Development and was president and CEO of Philadelphia Area Accelerated Manufacturing Education.

Gallardo was a lay pastor for Latino ministries at All Saints church in Pasadena, California, from 2015 until 2019, when he was ordained as a priest. He was vicar of St. Luke’s of the Mountains church in La Crescenta-Montrose, California, and in 2023 became rector of St. Luke's church in Long Beach, California.

On November 8, 2025, he was elected as the 8th Bishop of Los Angeles, succeeding John Harvey Taylor. His consecration took place at All Saints church in Pasadena on July 11, 2026, in the presence of the Presiding Bishop of the Episcopal Church, Sean Rowe.
