= Lucena (surname) =

Lucena is a surname of Spanish origin. Notable people with the surname include:

- Antonio Gallardo Lucena, Venezuela-born American Episcopal bishop
- César Lucena (born 1980), retired Brazilian footballer
- Elena Lucena (1914–2015), Argentine film actress
- Francisco de Lucena (c. 1578–1643), Portuguese nobleman
- Franklin Lucena (born 1981), Venezuelan footballer
- Jacquin Strouss Lucena (born 1953), former First Lady of Colombia
- Jerry Lucena (born 1980), retired Filipino footballer
- Juan de Lucena (1430–1506), Spanish humanist
- Luis Ramírez de Lucena (c. 1465 – c. 1530), Spanish chess player
- Manuel Lucena (born 1982), retired Spanish footballer
- Matt Lucena (born 1969), retired American tennis player
- Nick Lucena (born 1979), American beach volleyball player
- Rafael Lucena Marques (born 1989), Portuguese footballer
- Ronaldo Lucena (born 1997), Venezuelan footballer
- Tibisay Lucena, president of the National Electoral Council of Venezuela
- Wendell Lucena Ramalho (1947–2022), Brazilian football goalkeeper and coach
- William Lucena (born 1981), retired Italian baseball pitcher of Venezuelan descent

== See also ==
- Lucena (disambiguation)
