= Episcopal Diocese of Los Angeles =

Diocese of the Episcopal Church in the United States

Coordinates: 34.119444°N 118.260456°W

Diocese of Los Angeles Diocesis de Los Angeles

Location
- Country: United States
- Territory: Los Angeles, Orange, Santa Barbara, and Ventura
- Ecclesiastical province: Province VIII
- Headquarters: St. Paul's Commons, Echo Park

Statistics
- Congregations: 128 (2025)
- Members: 33,162 (2025)

Information
- Denomination: The Episcopal Church
- Rite: Anglican & local variants
- Established: December 3, 1895
- Cathedral: St. John's Cathedral
- Patron saint: Our Lady of Guadalupe
- Language: English, Spanish, Cantonese, Japanese, Mandarin, Tagalog, Taiwanese Hokkien, Korean, Vietnamese

Current leadership
- Bishop of Los Angeles: Antonio Gallardo Lucena
- Assistant bishop: Franklin Brookhart, Ed Little, Naudal Gomes
- Apostolic Administrator: Rev. Jon Feuss (Canon to the Ordinary)
- Archdeacon: Laura Siriani
- Bishops emeritus: John H. Taylor

Map
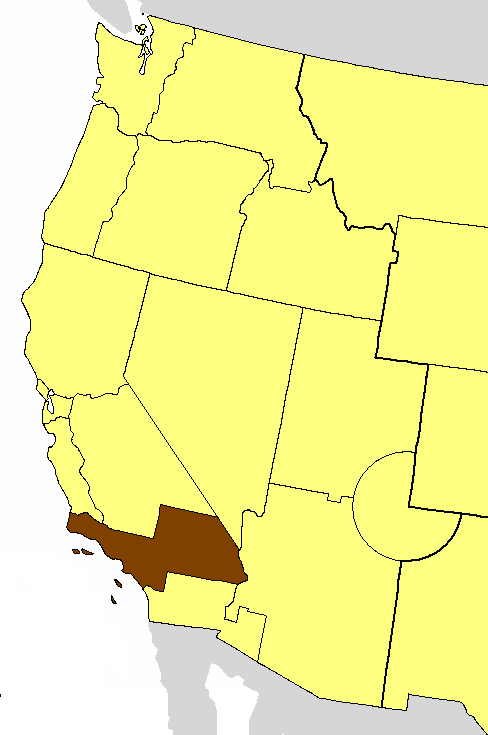
- Location of the Diocese of Los Angeles

Website
- www.diocesela.org

The Episcopal Diocese of Los Angeles is a community of 33,162 Episcopalians in 133 congregations, 36 schools, and six service institutions, spanning all of Los Angeles, Orange, San Bernardino, Santa Barbara, and Ventura counties, and part of Riverside County making it one of the largest Episcopal dioceses in the United States by land area.

In 2025, the diocese reported average Sunday attendance (ASA) of 7,908 persons. From 2016 to 2025, membership declined from 50,291 persons to 33,162 persons.

The Diocese of Los Angeles was established in 1895 by vote of the General Convention of the national church. The diocese's first convention was held in 1896.

The diocese is led by its bishop, presently the Rt. Rev. Antonio Gallardo Lucena; its administrative hub is St. Paul's Commons, located in the Echo Park district of Los Angeles. St. John's Cathedral is the cathedral of the diocese and the center for major diocesan liturgical functions.

The common ministry of the diocese is guided by its convention, held annually (usually in Riverside County). Between annual meetings, the work of convention is overseen by the diocesan council, which meets usually each month at St. Paul's Commons.

It shares an exchange ministry with Episcopal Diocese of Taiwan, has a few sister dioceses such as the Episcopal Diocese of Puerto Rico and shares cordial relations with Christian denominations such as Old Catholics, the Philippine Independent Church, Armenian Apostolic Church, Evangelical Lutheran Church in America, the local Church of Sweden congregation and shares social justice ministries with the Islamic Center of Southern California, multiple Reformed Jewish congregations and other organizations in the region and internationally.

It is considered one of the most liberal Episcopal dioceses on the continent, yet it also has a large amount of conservative laity and some clergy in harmony with liberal laity and clergy.

Ethnically the diocese is diverse with Hispanics being the fastest growing group followed by Asian Americans mostly of Chinese and Taiwanese descent, with a steady Filipino and Korean growth as well.

On 2025, the Rev. Dr. Antonio Gallardo Lucena, rector of St. Luke's Episcopal Church (Long Beach, California) was elected as its first bishop of Hispanic descent (born in Barquisimeto, Venezuela) He succeeded Bishop Taylor on July 11, 2026 and was installed at St. John's Cathedral (Los Angeles) a day later.

Laity in the diocese are active across national and international episcopal and Anglican bodies, such as the Anglican Consultative Council, the General Convention of the Episcopal Church among others.

== Bishops of Los Angeles ==
=== Diocesan bishops ===
1. Joseph Horsfall Johnson (1895–1928)
2. W. Bertrand Stevens (1928–1947, Coadjutor 1920–1928)
3. Francis Eric Bloy (1948–1973)
4. Robert Claflin Rusack (1974–1986, Coadjutor 1972–1974)
5. Frederick Houk Borsch (1988–2002)
6. J. Jon Bruno (2002–2017, Coadjutor 2000–2002)
7. John Taylor (2017–2026, Coadjutor 2016–2017)
8. Antonio Gallardo Lucena (2026–present)

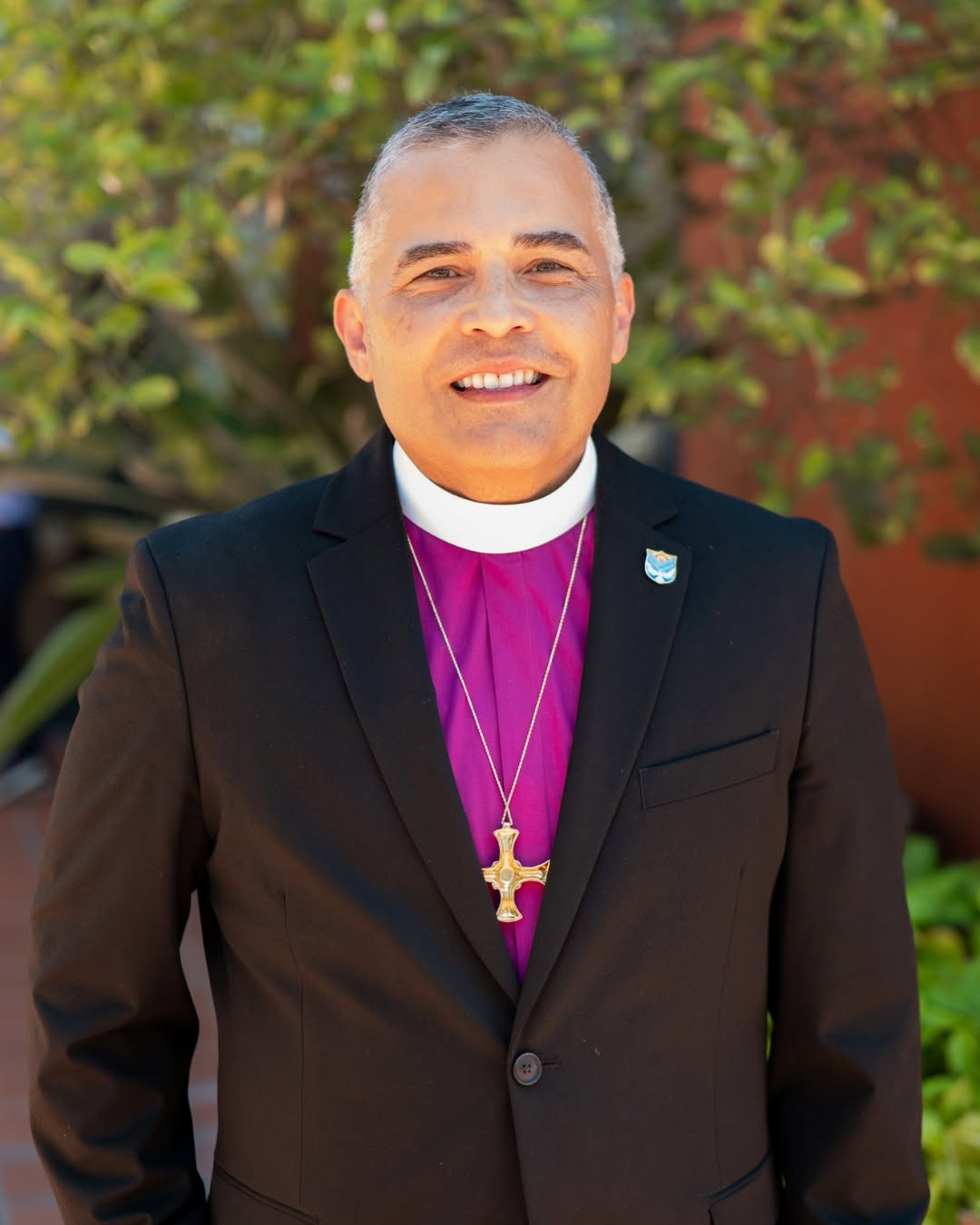
Antonio Gallardo Lucena, the current Episcopal Bishop of Los Angeles.

=== Current Bishops assisting ===
1. C. Franklin Brookhart Jr.
2. Edward S. Little II
3. Naudal Alves Gomes

=== Suffragan bishops ===
- Robert B. Gooden (1930–1947)
- Donald J. Campbell (1949–1959)
- Ivol I. Curtis (1960–1964)
- Robert Claflin Rusack (1964–1973)
- Oliver B. Garver, Jr. (1985–1990)
- Chester L. Talton (1991–2010)
- Diane Jardine Bruce (2010–2021)
- Mary Douglas Glasspool (2010–2016)

== Notable parishes ==
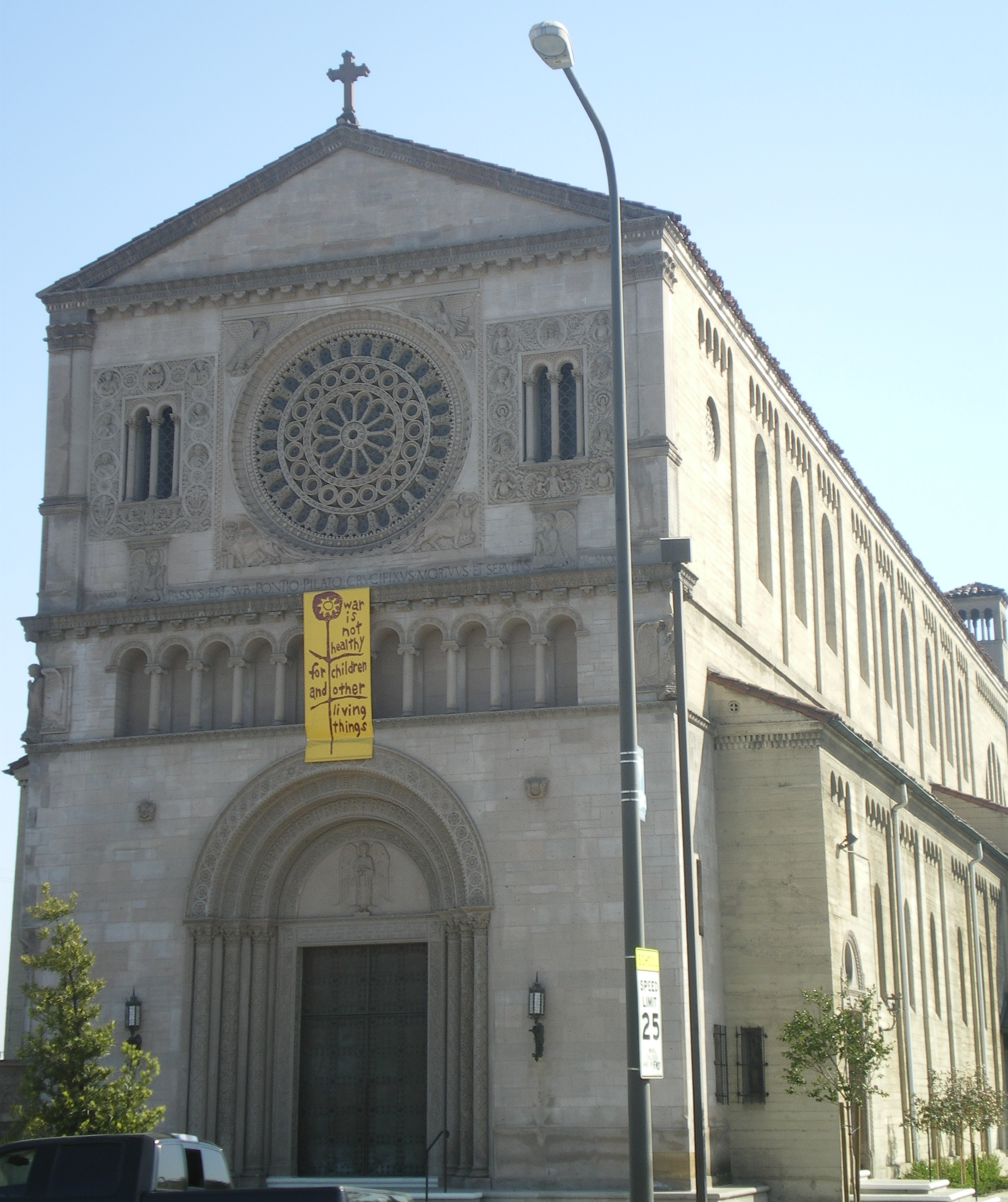
St. John's Cathedral(2015)

- St. Mark's Episcopal Church, Glendale
- All Saints Church, Pasadena
- St. James' Church, South Pasadena
- All Saints' Episcopal Church, Beverly Hills
- St. Pauls Commons & St Athanasius Church, Los Angeles
- St. John's Cathedral, Los Angeles
- St. Luke's Episcopal Church, Long Beach
- St. Thomas the Apostle, Hollywood
- Church of the Epiphany/La Epifania, Lincoln Heights
- Parish of St. Matthew, Pacific Palisades
- St. James' in the city (Los Angeles)

== Education ==
Some schools include St. James' Episcopal School, an elementary school which opened in 1968. It has 359 students on roll of varying economic, ethnic, racial and social backgrounds. Josh Groban is a notable former student.

It also has a diocese education school called Bloy House, which serves as the local training spot for clergy and laity, while most of its MDiv pursuing students attend Church Divinity School of the Pacific, Fuller Theological Seminary, Virginia Theological Seminary, Berkeley Divinity School at Yale , Bexley Seabury Theological Seminary and Episcopal Divinity School or Nashotah House.
