= St. James' Episcopal Church (Los Angeles) =

St. James' in-the-City
- St. James' Episcopal Church
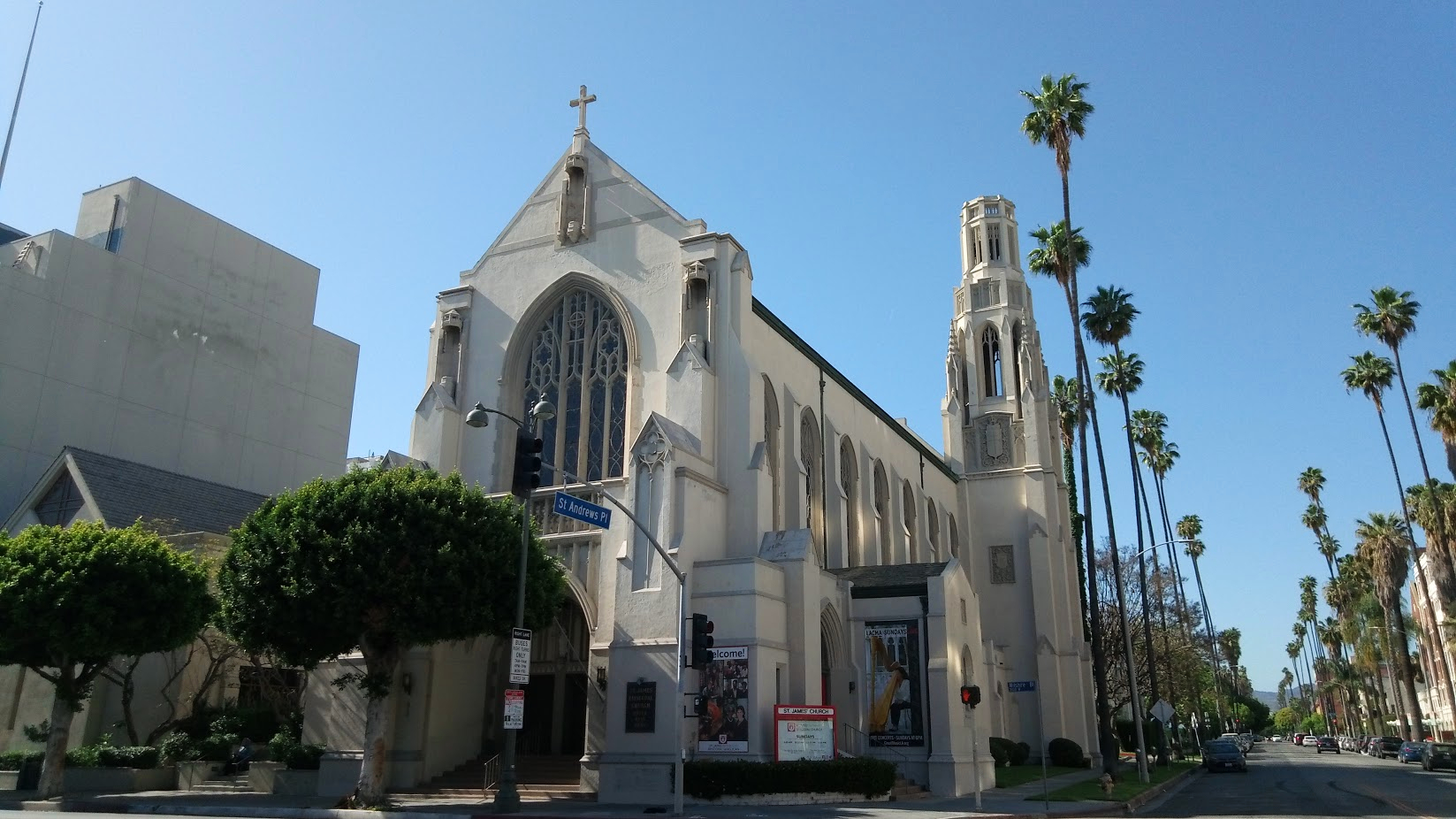
- St. James' Episcopal Church in 2020

- Location in Los Angeles St. James' in-the-City (California) St. James' in-the-City (the United States)
- 34.062096°N 118.312015°W
- Location: 3903 Wilshire Blvd, Los Angeles, California
- Country: United States
- Denomination: Episcopal
- Website: stjla.org/

Architecture
- Functional status: Active
- Architect: Benjamin McDougall
- Style: Gothic Revival
- Years built: 1925

Administration
- Diocese: Los Angeles

Clergy
- Rector: The Rev. Kate Cress

St. James' Episcopal Church, or St. James' in-the-City, as it is commonly called, to distinguish it from the St. James' Episcopal Church in South Pasadena, is a historic Episcopal church, located in the Wilshire Center area of Los Angeles, California, between Koreatown and Hancock Park. St. James' in-the-City Episcopal Church is part of the Episcopal Diocese of Los Angeles.

In 2017, the church reported 890 members; in 2023, it reported 607 members. No membership statistics were reported in 2024 national parochial reports. Average Sunday Attendance (ASA) reported by the church in 2024 was 199 persons. This was a relative decrease from ASA of 281 persons reported in 2019.

== History ==
The first services at St. James' were held in 1908. The St James' parish was established in 1912. The Rev. Noel Porter was the first rector. The first church was located 1.5 miles southeast of the current building, at Pico and Ardmore Boulevards.

In 1914, Los Angeles Boy Scout Troop 10, the oldest continuously-sponsored Boy Scout troop in the United States, was founded under the parish's auspices and remains under its sponsorship today.

In 1916, the congregation moved to a larger building farther north, at the corner of Western Avenue and Monette Place. The early parish boundaries stretched from Western Avenue to the Pacific Ocean but moved inland later when new Episcopal parishes were founded in Beverly Hills, Westwood and the Pacific Palisades.

The current church building was designed by Benjamin McDougall, a renowned San Francisco Bay area architect, in Gothic Revival style, and built in 1925-26 on a lot on Wilshire Boulevard, bought originally by the Rev. Ray Miller. The building is constructed of reinforced concrete with a stucco overlay.

The roof of the church is 60 feet high at its highest point; the bell tower is 100 feet high. The ceiling of the church is structured with redwood beams and trusses to resemble the inside of a ship's hull. The floor is paved with ceramic tiles that bear the same Celtic cross motif as the floors of the nearby Immanuel Presbyterian Church.

The building's richly colored stained glass windows were created by Judson Studios over many years, from 1932 to the present. Besides traditional religious scenes of saints and biblical figures, the windows depict motives symbolic of the times when the windows were installed: a movie camera, the Apollo moonwalk, freeway lanes, downtown Los Angeles skyline, the Korean flag, Latino immigrants.

In 1965, the funeral of Nat King Cole who was a parishioner of St. James’, took place at the church, and was attended by Duke Ellington, Frank Sinatra, Robert F. Kennedy, Pat Brown, and other prominent people.

In 1994, a new parish hall and office complex, designed by architect Johannes Van Tilburg, was added to the church, and a columbarium was built in the chapel.

== School ==
In September 1968, the parish opened St. James’ Episcopal School, to provide elementary education for families in the parish neighborhood. Over the years, the school expanded to a K-6 school to include also Kindergarten classes. In 1981, the school moved to its current location on St. Andrews Place, directly north of the church.

== Organ ==
The church houses a rebuilt 1911 Murray M. Harris organ that replaced an earlier 1926 Kimball organ. The Murray Harris organ was acquired from St. Paul's Cathedral in downtown Los Angeles where it had been kept in storage after the church's demolition in 1980 due to earthquake damage. The organ was extensively restored and rebuilt, and arrived at St. James’ in April of 1995. The restored organ has approximately 5,000 pipes, 50 divisions, 3 manuals and 66 stops. In memory of David Falconer who spearheaded the acquisition project as the choirmaster at St. James’ from 1983 until his murder in 1994, the organ is named David John Falconer Memorial Organ.

== Performance and filming venue ==
The church's sanctuary has been used as a concert venue for choral performances in the church's Great Music programming, for organ recitals in the church's International Laureates Organ Series, and for the Los Angeles County Museum of Art Sundays Live chamber music programming, broadcast live by KUSC.

St. James' church has also been featured in music videos for Tyrese and Ariana Grande, in television pilots and TV shows, such as Germany's Next Topmodel, Mad Men, and The West Wing, and in the films Death Becomes Her and End of Days.

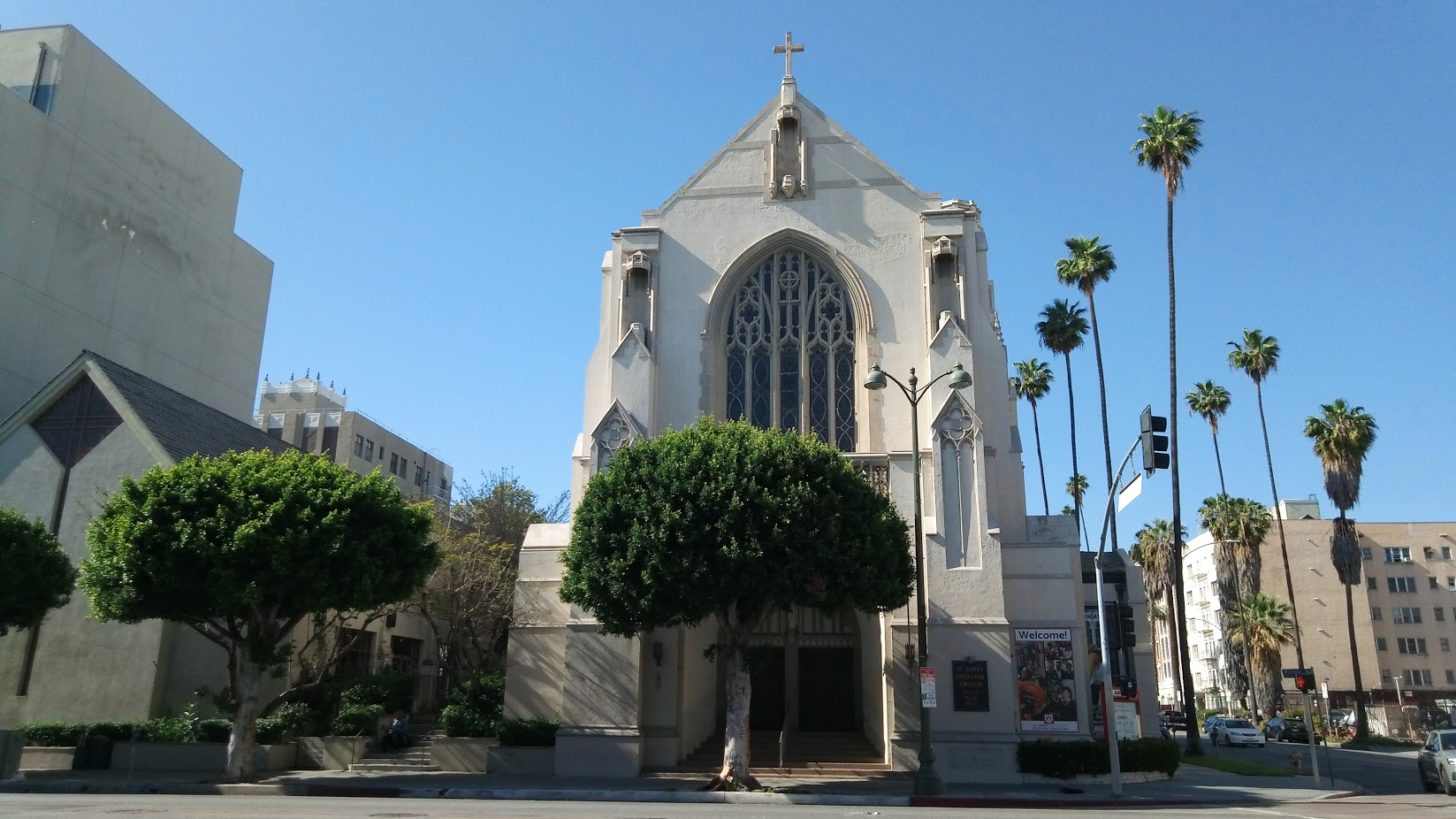
A view across Wilshire Boulevard

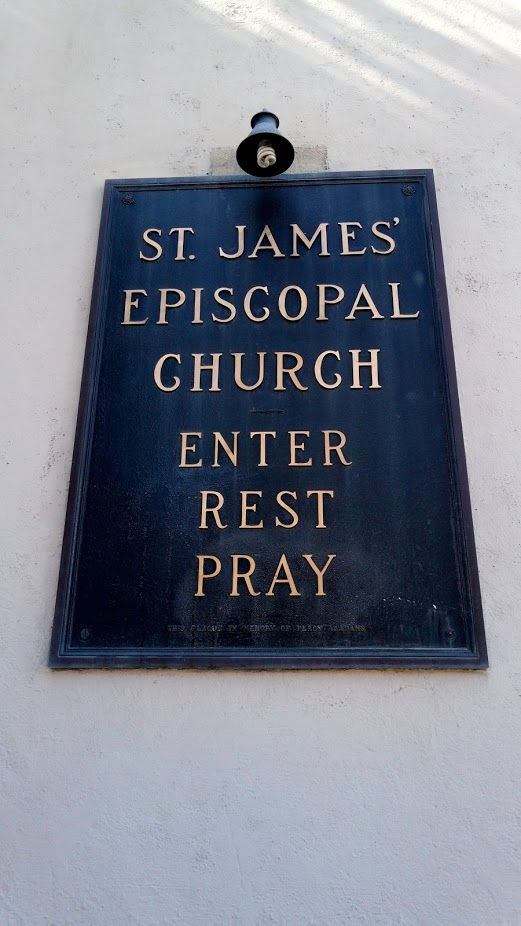
Church sign

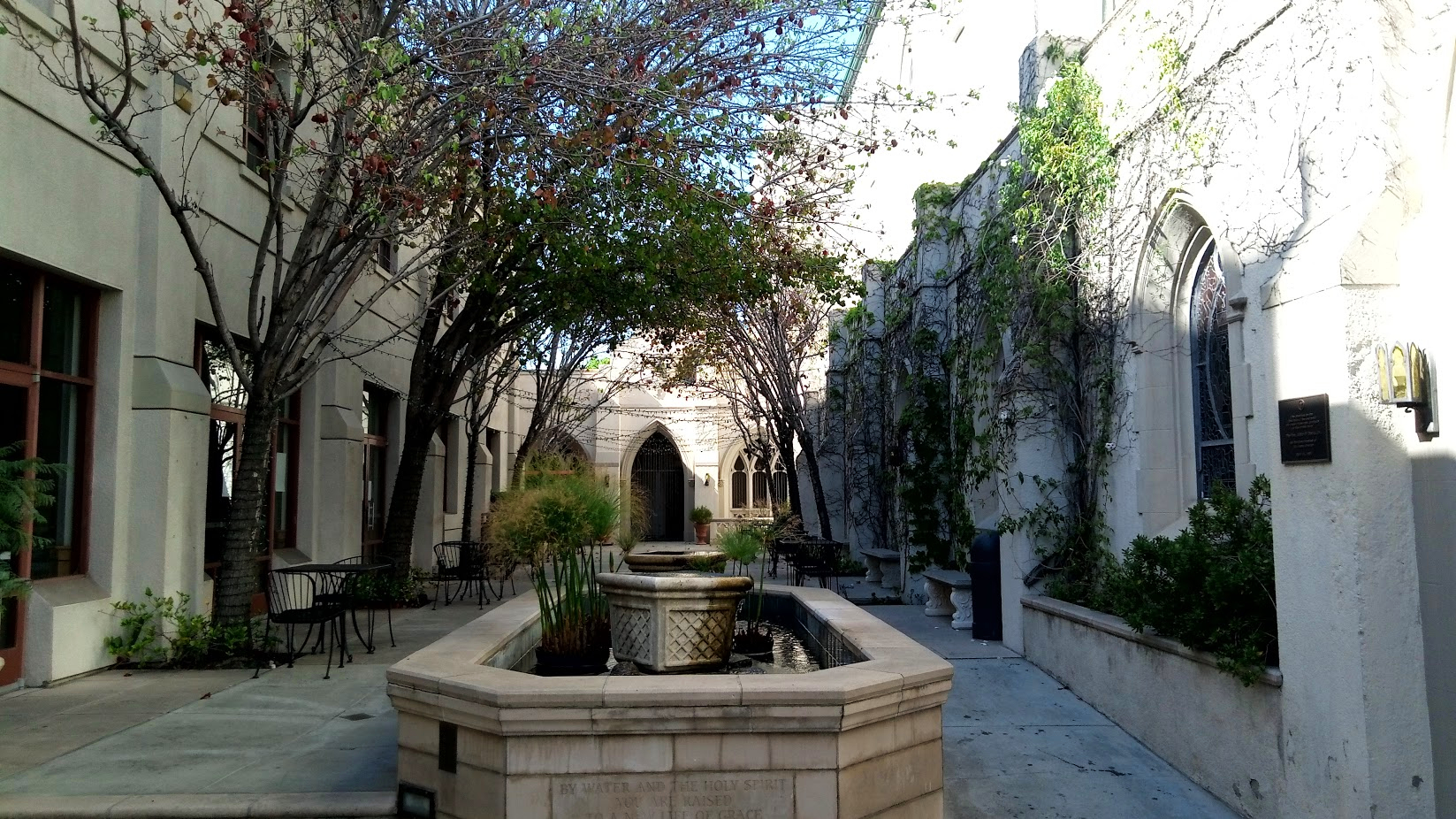
Courtyard

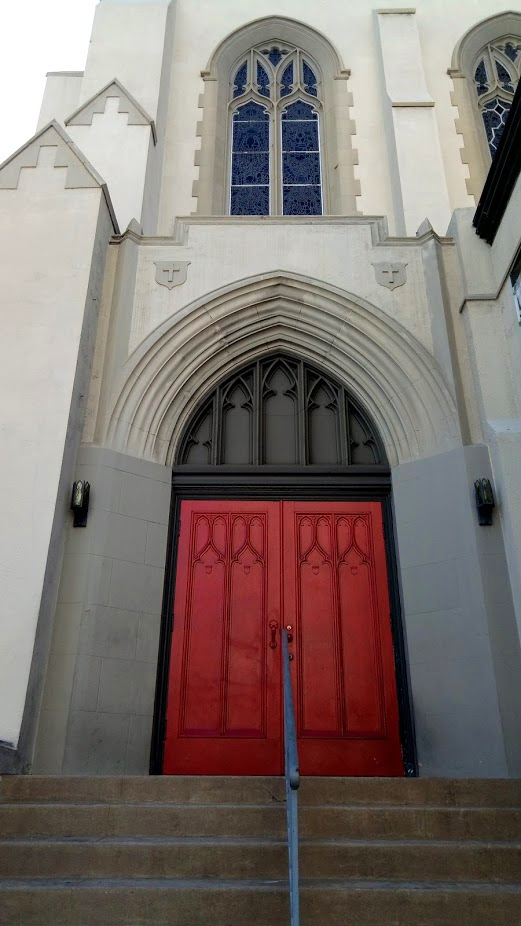
Church door

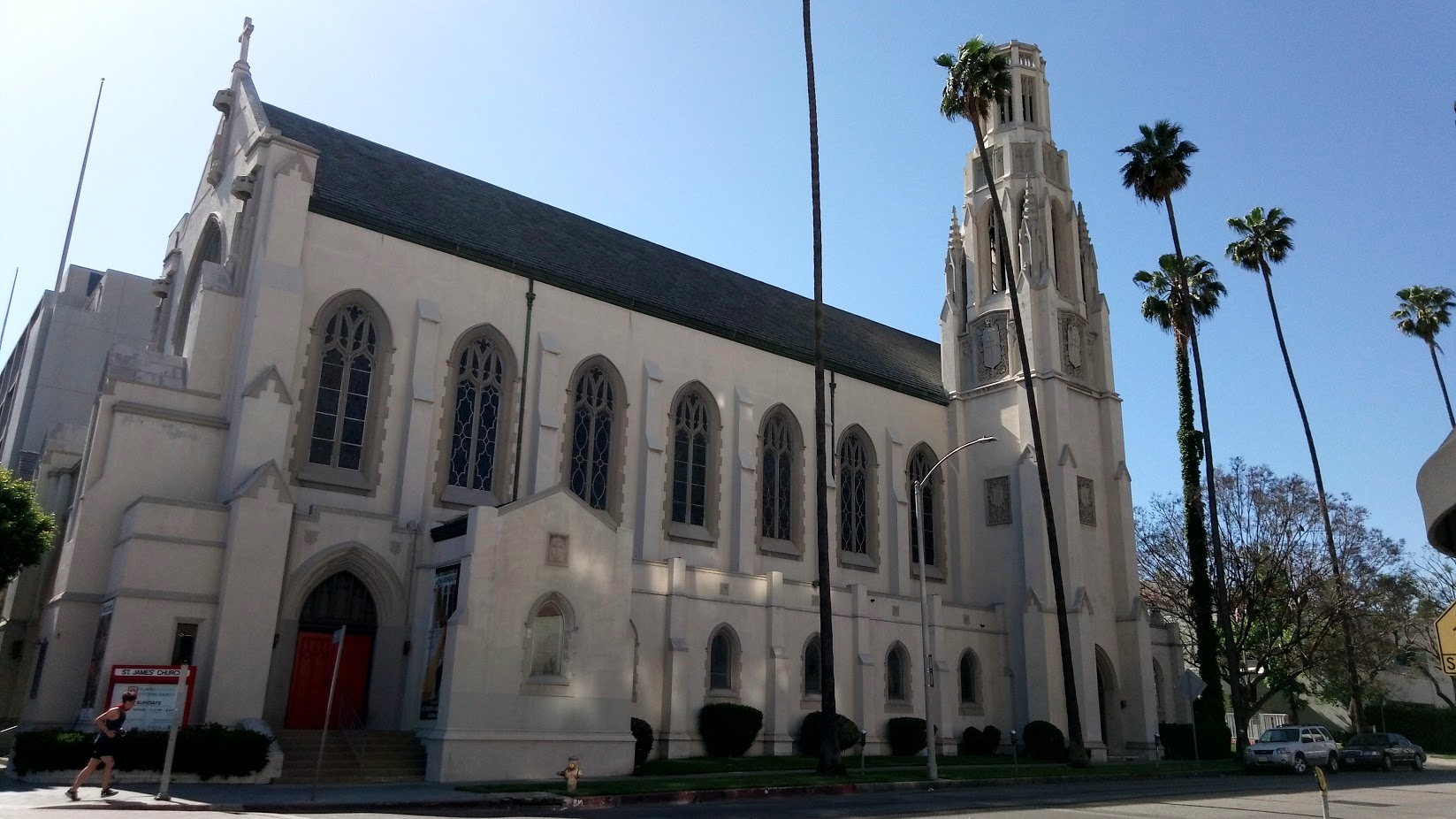
A view across St Andrews Place
