= St. John's Cathedral (Los Angeles) =

Saint John's Episcopal Cathedral
- Saint John's Cathedral
- Catedral Episcopal San Juan 聖約翰大教堂 세인트 존 성공회 대성당
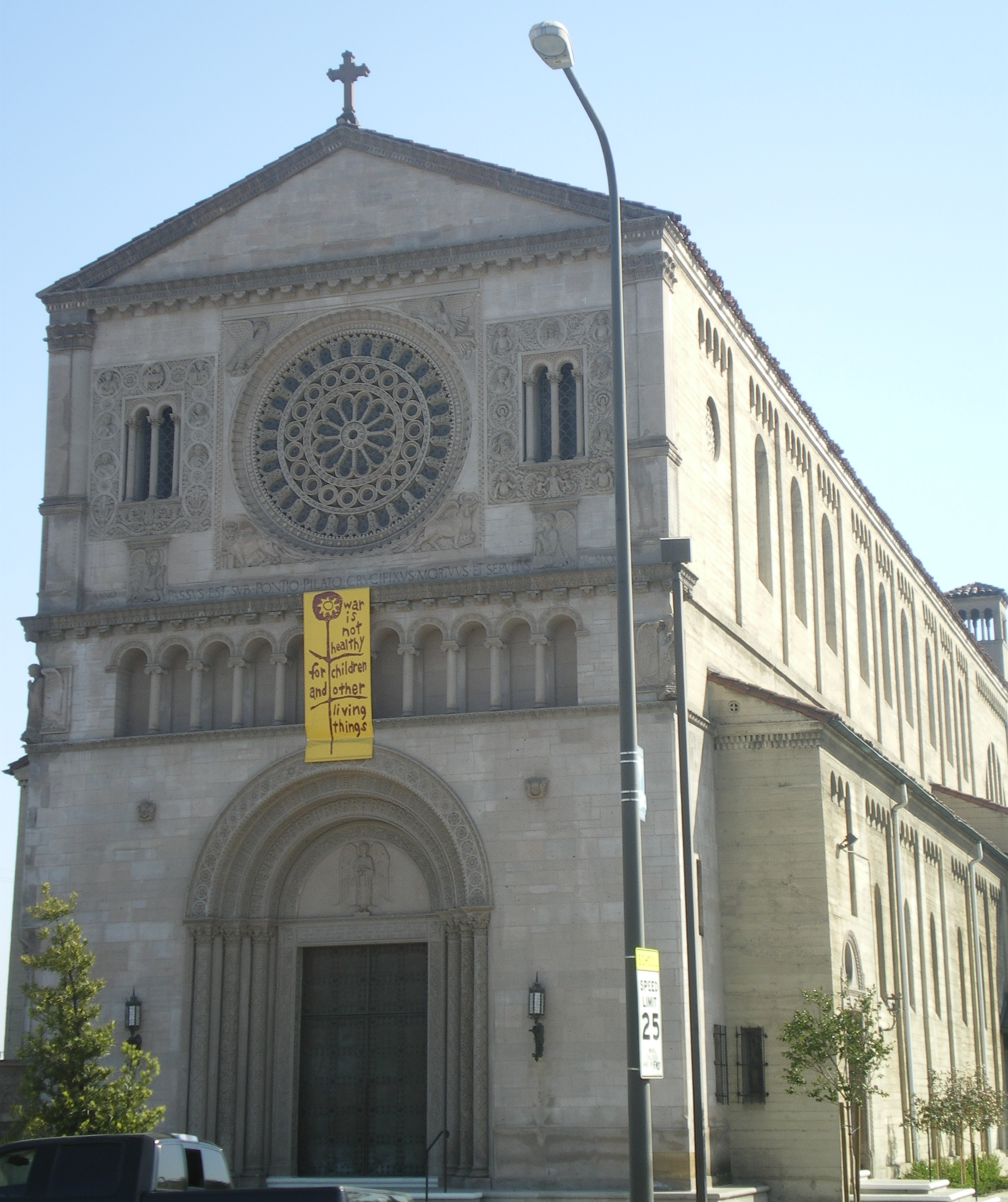
- Saint John's Episcopal Cathedral
- Location: University Park, Los Angeles
- Address: 514 W. Adams Blvd. Los Angeles, CA
- Language(s): English, Spanish, Korean, Japanese, Traditional Chinese, Belize Kriol, Simplified Chinese, Mayan Katchikel.
- Denomination: Episcopal Church
- Tradition: Central churchmanship
- Churchmanship: Liberal Anglo-Catholicism and Broad church
- Website: www.stjohnsla.org

History
- Former name(s): Saint John's Church, St. John's Pro-Cathedral
- Status: Active

Architecture
- Functional status: Cathedral
- Previous cathedrals: St Paul's Cathedral (demolished)
- Years built: 1925

Specifications
- Capacity: 400(max)

Administration
- Province: Province 8 of the Episcopal Church
- Metropolis: Greater Los Angeles
- Diocese: Episcopal Diocese of Los Angeles
- Deanery: Deanery 4 – El Centro

Clergy
- Bishop: The Right Rev. Dr. Antonio Gallardo-Lucena
- Dean: The Very Rev. Anne Sawyer
- Priest(s): The Rev. Mel Soriano: Priest Associate (Faith, Formation, and Finance.)

- St. John's Cathedral
- U.S. National Register of Historic Places
- Los Angeles Historic-Cultural Monument
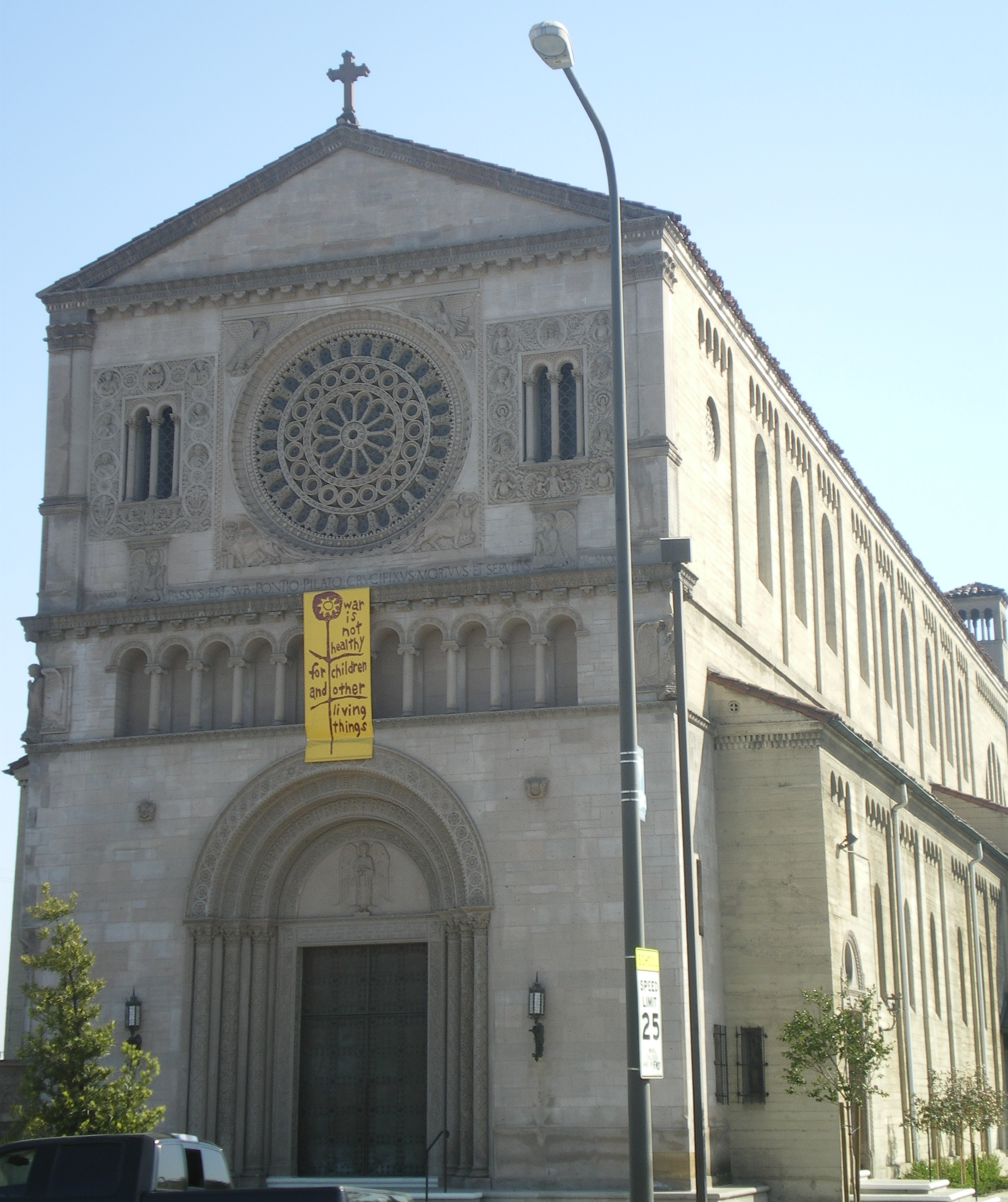

- Location within the Los Angeles metropolitan area Location within California Location within the United States
- Location: 514 W. Adams Blvd; Los Angeles, California
- Coordinates: 34°1′38″N 118°16′29″W
- Built: 1925
- Architects: Davis & Davis; Hanson, Luis
- Architectural style: Romanesque Revival
- NRHP reference No.: 00000425
- LAHCM No.: 516

Significant dates
- Added to NRHP: May 5, 2000
- Designated LAHCM: January 22, 1991

St. John's Cathedral is an Episcopal church near downtown Los Angeles that serves as both a parish church and the cathedral church of the Episcopal Diocese of Los Angeles, an area covering five and a half counties. Though St. John's was formed in 1890, the current Romanesque Revival architectural style church was built in 1925. It was listed in the National Register of Historic Places in 2000.

In 2021, the church reported 444 members; in 2025, it reported 157 members. Plate and pledge financial support reported by the church in 2025 was $334,719. Average Sunday Attendance (ASA) reported by the church in 2025 was 128 persons. This was a relative decrease from ASA of 192 persons reported in 2021.

== Early history ==
St. John's was founded in 1890. The Los Angeles Times reported on the groundbreaking ceremony in a front-page story:

Quite a large number of interested people assembled on foot and in carriages at the corner of Figueroa and Adams streets, at 4 p.m. yesterday, to witness the laying of the cornerstone of St. John's Episcopal Church. The clergy, in their vestments, preceded by the vestry of the parish, came on the grounds in procession, opening the service as they approached the building site. ... St. John's is to be a tasteful Gothic structure of brick, with stone facings, and wood, capable of seating 150 people. It is placed on the lot as to admit of the erection of a larger structure in the near future. The original neo-Gothic church was consecrated in June 1894.

== George Davidson ==
In 1913, George Davidson became rector of St. John's, a position he held until 1951. Davidson led the church during a period of growth, as membership rose from 400 to 2,300. He was also a member of the faculty at USC for 14 years, served as president of the American Society for the Prevention of Cruelty to Animals (ASPCA), and was one of the first organizers of the city's Community Chest drives. When Davidson retired in 1951 at age 71, more than 1,000 people attended his final service at St. John's. At the time, he said, "In all humility, I express my gratitude. My prayers are for St. John's and may His blessing be upon all its loyal members who have raised its standard high. ... The joys and sorrows, the achievements and failures, the happiness and loneliness of many people during the years have been so woven into the fabric of my life that it is difficult for me to express adequately the mingling feelings of my heart in this solemn hour." Davidson died in July 1967 in Los Angeles.

== New church building ==
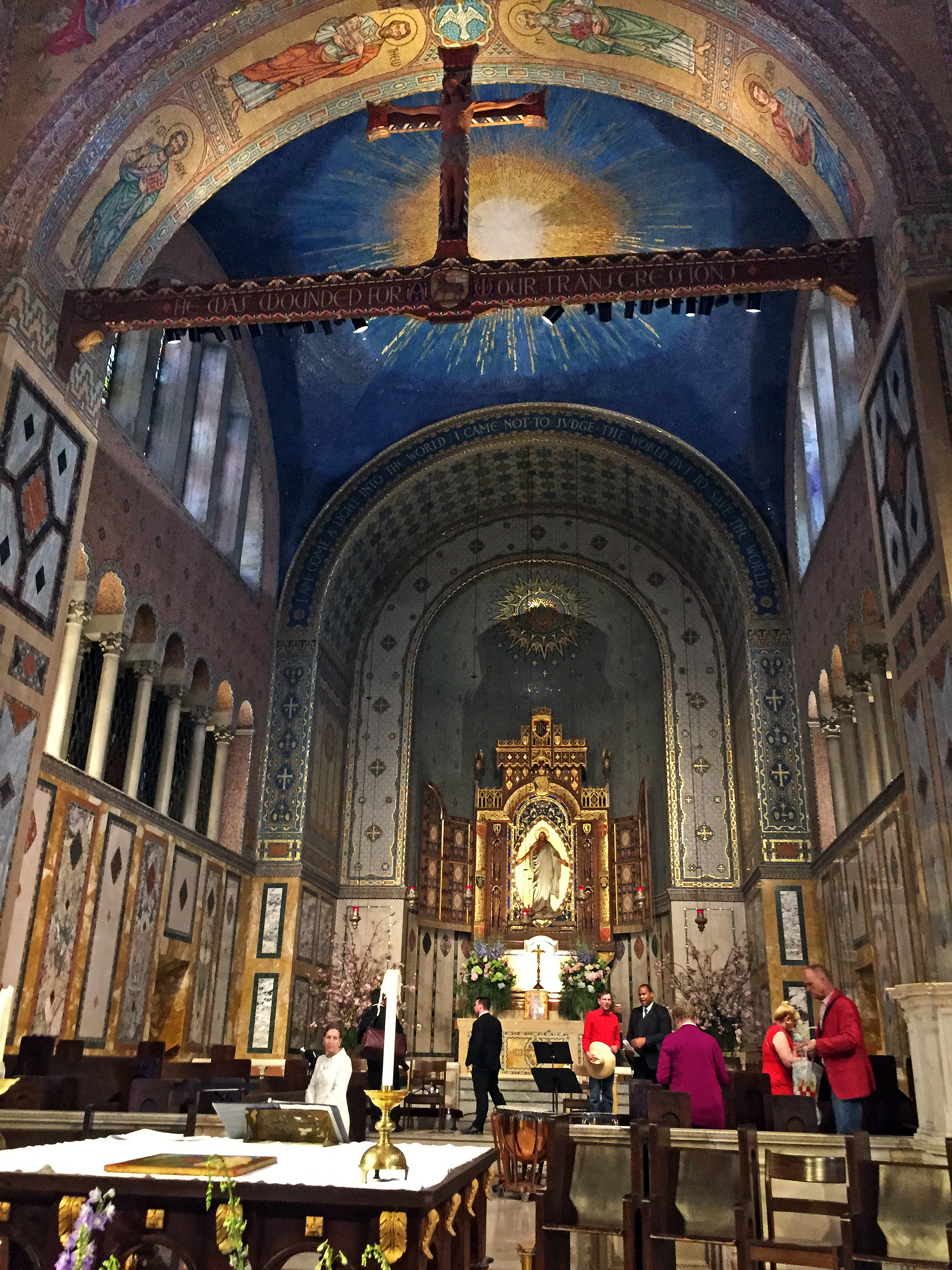
The interior of St. John's Cathedral (Episcopal) in Los Angeles on Easter morning, 2019.

By 1920, St. John's had outgrown the existing church structure, and a contest to design the new church was won by brothers Pierpont and Walter Davis. The Davis brothers designed the church in an Italian neo-Romanesque style modeled after the 11th-century church of San Pietro in Tuscania, about 75 miles northwest of Rome.

The new church opened in 1924, after two years of construction, and was consecrated in 1925. The Los Angeles Times reported that the last service in the old church was "rife with tender memories" and an "added charm and reverence pervaded the occasion." When the new church opened the following week, the Times called it "one of the most beautiful and costly edifices in the country." Another report noted: "Critics declare it the most beautiful in Los Angeles." Built at a cost of $650,000 (approximately $9.67 million in 2025), the church was described at the time as a "close copy of an Italian church of the sixth century in built at Toscanella."

The church's walls are made of reinforced concrete two and a half feet thick clear to the roof, and the structure is 69 feet from floor to ceiling. The wood-beamed ceiling is a reproduction of a church ceiling from the 11th century at San Miniato, near Florence. The altar is made of Italian marble, and the triptych was carved by Oberammergau workmen. The interior includes a stained glass window featuring Martin Luther King Jr., installed in 1977. Other windows include a Romanesque rose window. Another striking feature of the church is found in the gold mosaics on the chapel walls. One mosaic depicts the Virgin Mary and Christ child modeled after a 13th-century mosaic at the Cathedral of Santa Maria Assunta in Torcello, Italy. There is also a mosaic of Jesus as judge, holding a Bible and giving a blessing, a 12th-century convention.

At the time the new church opened in 1924, St. John's had 2,000 communicants on its membership list and was the largest Episcopal church west of Chicago.

In 1947, The Seven Angels mosaics were added to the church at a cost of $150,000 (approximately $1.7 million in 2025). The figures of the angels, each eight feet high and holding a musical instrument, were made of Italian marble with gold mosaic and stand in arched panels. The mosaics were created in Italy by five artists who spent two years working on them.

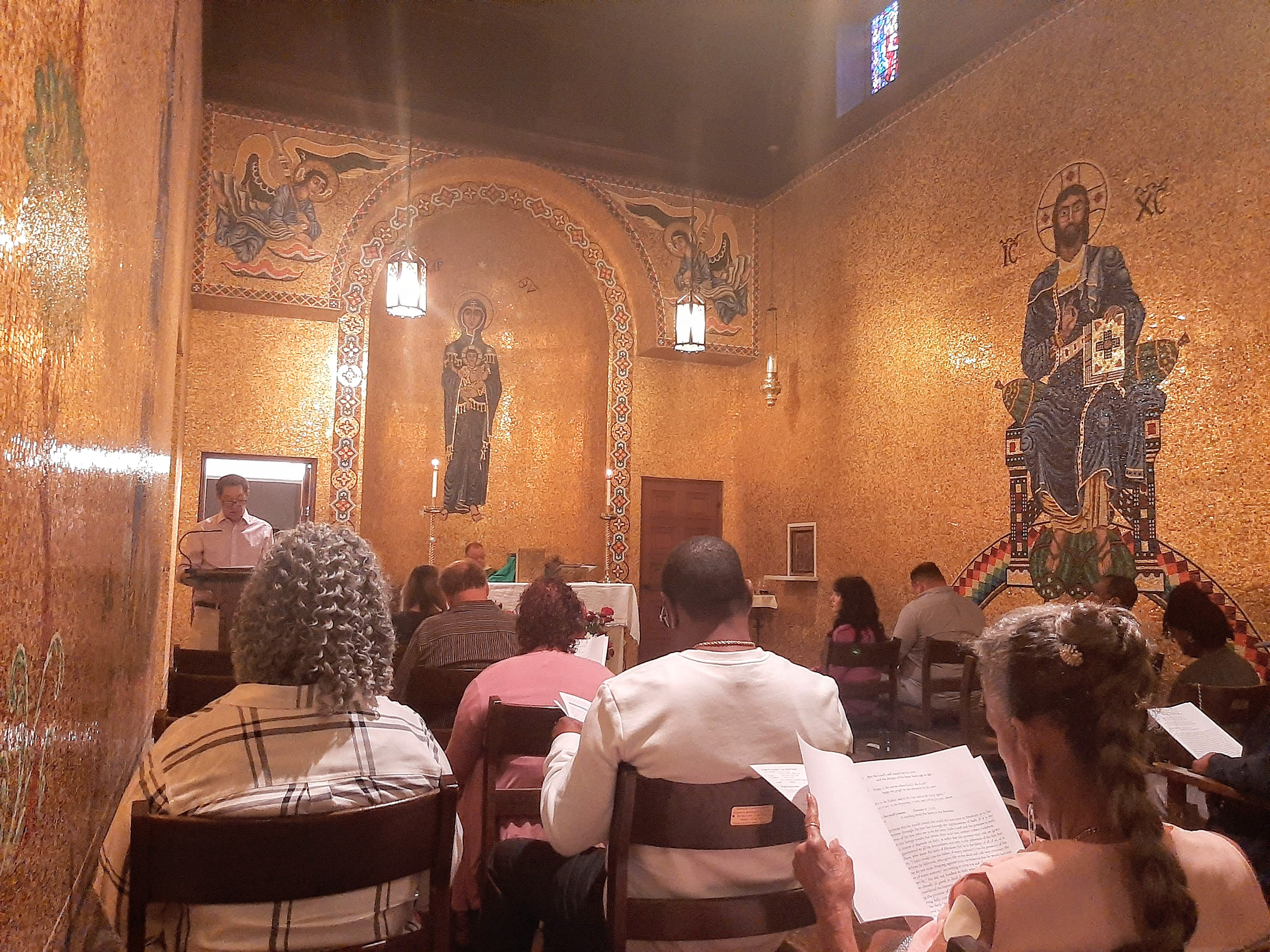
Our Lady Chapel, part of the Cathedral used for smaller services. Next to the Chancel in the left side.

The Lady Chapel is a small oratory to the left of the main altar that serves for occasional small eucharistic services, private prayer and other liturgical functions.

== Lawrence Carter's "metropolitan church" ==
From 1958 to 1974, the Rev. E. Lawrence Carter was the rector of St. John's. During his tenure, the surrounding area changed from one of white affluence to racially mixed poverty. "Carter led the church in changing with it, moving from an upper-level parish church controlled by businessmen to what he termed a metropolitan church welcoming leaders of many races and economic backgrounds." In 1973, Carter recalled: "There never was a mass exodus, a confrontation, nothing like that. Just a slow ebbing, a dilution socially, economically, racially." He described his concept of a "metropolitan church" as the need for an urban church "to do the social bit". He noted that "Mainline churches cannot be the church unless they pay attention to the community where they are. The church must be involved in all the areas of life." During his tenure as rector, Carter founded the St. John's Well Child Center and also worked to aid the homeless.

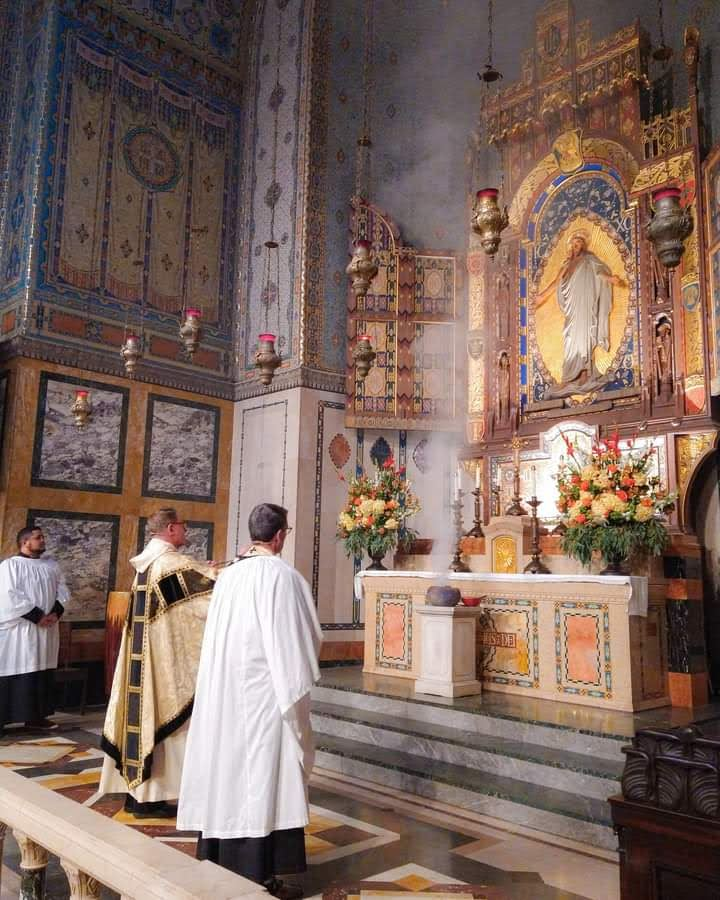

== Doors closed as a protest to Vietnam War ==
In 1970, Carter drew media attention when he closed the large ceremonial front doors of the church as a protest against the Vietnam War. He noted that the doors were closed "as a sign of our penitence and sorrow, as well as protest. Penitence for our silence and hence our part in the bloodshed. ... Protest that once again our beloved country has chosen guns and bombs instead of other means of reconciliation." The doors remained closed for three years until the war ended.

Carter officiates from pulpit at left as ceremonial front doors are re-opened after three years. Photo for the Los Angeles Times by Don Cormier

At the April 1973 ceremony at which the doors were reopened, Carter noted, "This is no moment of triumph. We reopen our doors as an affirmation, to a peace ... which will offer mankind a new life on this planet." The ceremony was interspersed with the sounding of a shofar, the ram's horn traditionally used in Jewish services. Though he considered the peace to be no more than an "armistice" enforced by the "terror of nuclear warheads," Carter said that the church "chose this moment to signify our thanksgiving that our bombers no longer rake the ravaged land, that our prisoners of war are finally home and our fighting forces withdrawn (from) an enterprise which drained the spiritual as well as the material resources of our land."

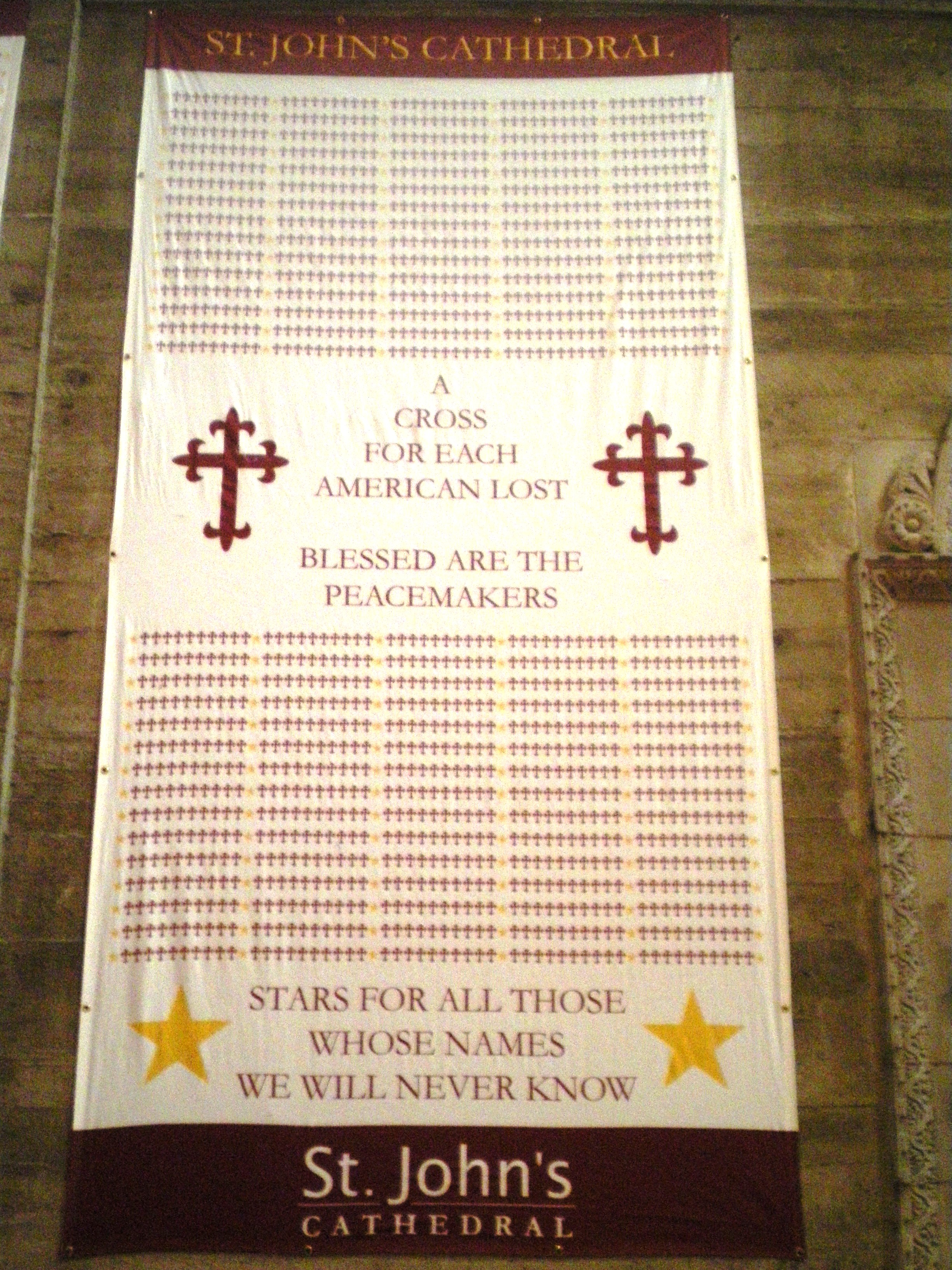
Banner for war dead at St. John's

In recent years, the St. John's community actively voiced its opposition to the War in Iraq and other interventions in the Middle East. Each Sunday, the names of each American military person who died in the war were read at the church's services. A banner at the back of the church had a cross marked for each American death in the war. And during the procession of the palms during Palm Sunday services, members of the congregation carried anti-war protest signs along with their palms.

== Designation as procathedral ==
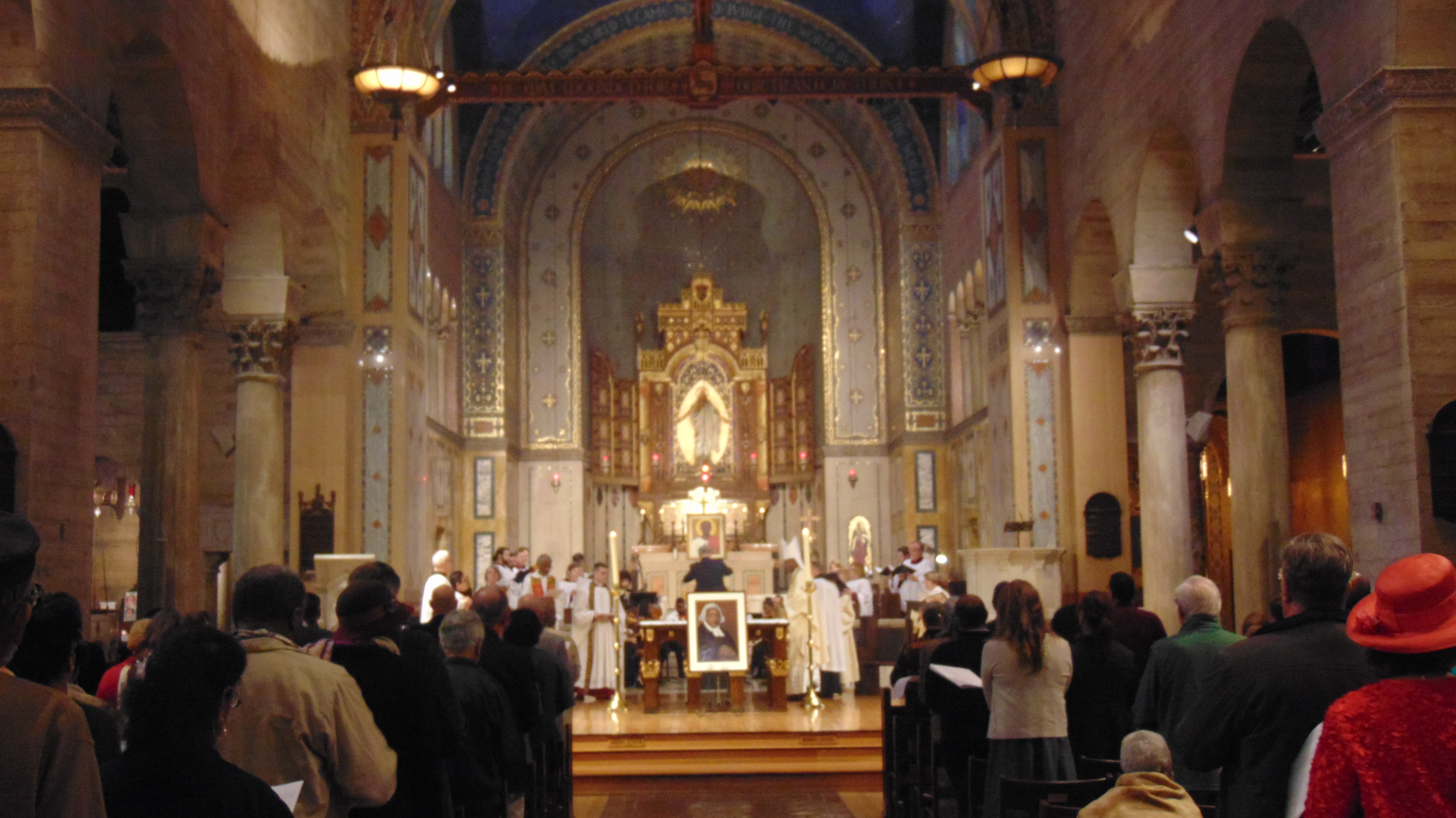
Bp. Chester Talton leads a full Cathedral on the commemoration of Absalom Jones on a Sunday in 2017.

In October 2007, Bishop J. Jon Bruno announced that St. John's had been named the procathedral of the Diocese of Los Angeles, with the cathedral functions to be shared with the Cathedral Center of St. Paul in Echo Park. Larger diocesan liturgical functions are carried out at St. John's while all other diocesan offices and functions are located at St. Paul's. The dedication was held in February 2008.

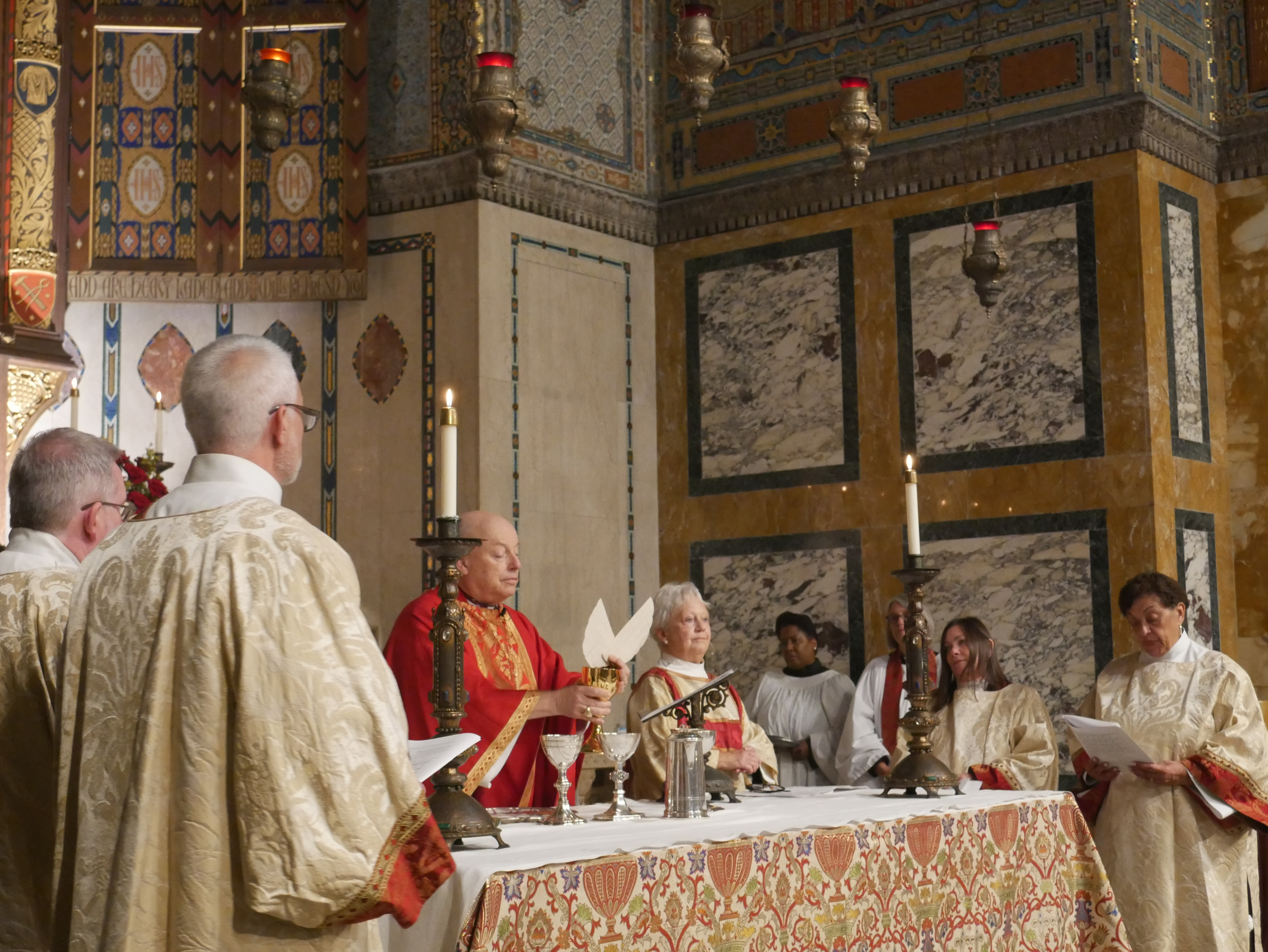
Bishop John Taylor leading an Eucharist from the High Altar during a diaconal ordination,

The Very Rev. Canon Mark Kowalewski, former rector of St. John's, noted that the changes were the culmination of years of conversations. He noted that when the current church was first built in the 1920s, its first rector, Fr. Davidson had wanted it to become the diocesan cathedral.

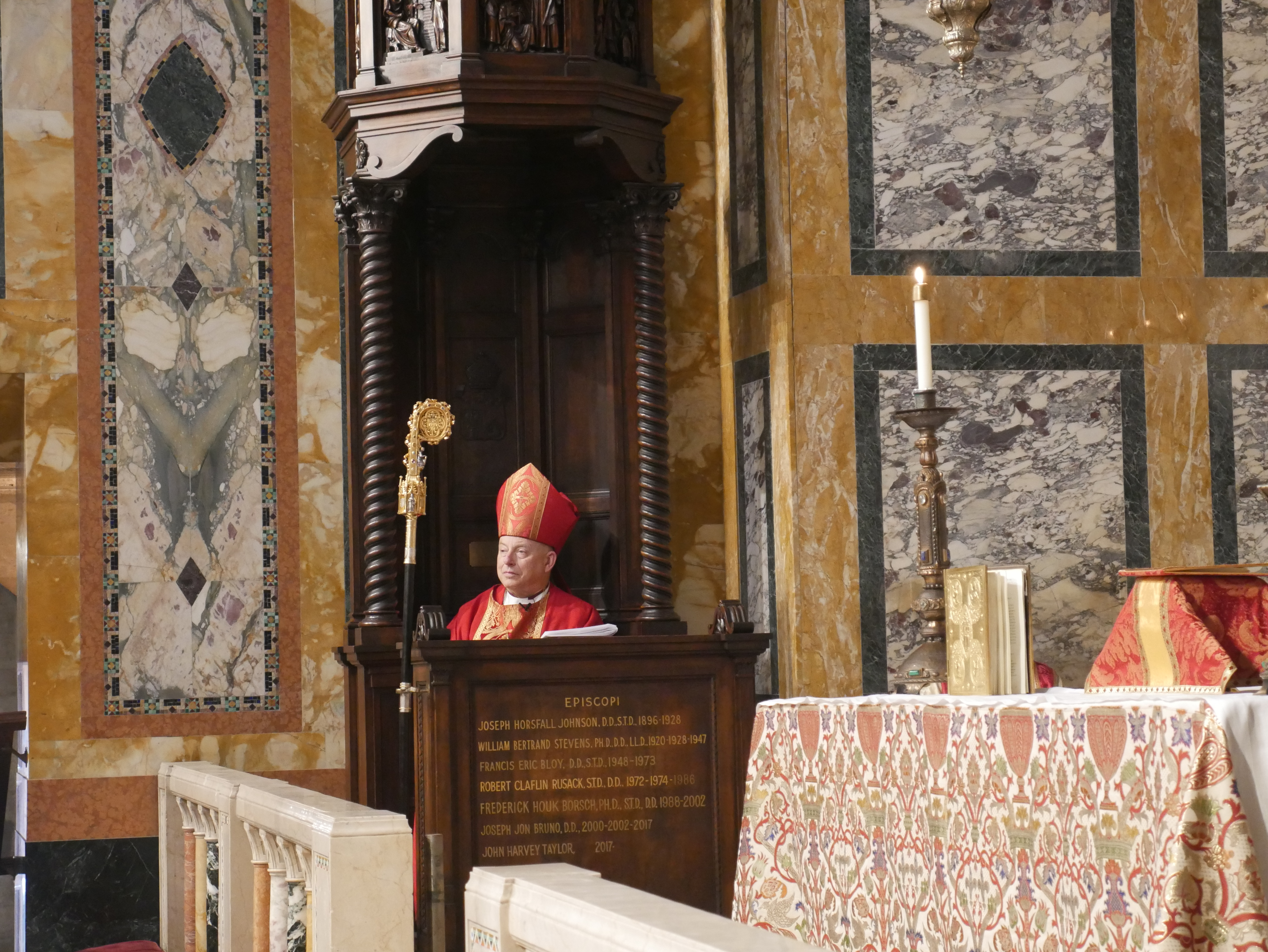
Los Angeles Bishop John Harvey Taylor sitting on the Cathedra at St John's.

St. John’s is home to the cathedra, or historic bishop's chair, originally located in L.A.'s former St. Paul's Cathedral (demolished in 1980 after seismic damage) and subsequent Cathedral Center in Echo Park, both built as diocesan cathedral churches.

In 2026 the St Paul's Cathedral Deans/Provost Chair was relocated from Echo Park to St. Johns by order of Bishop Taylor. This marked a milestone on the cathedral community and symbolically formalized St. Johns becoming the Diocesan Cathedral. A construction of housing and retail space on the city block owned by St. John's at 27th Street, Flower Street, Figueroa Street and West Adams Boulevard is pending different ecclesiastical and political approvals. The Reverend Anne Sawyer from Arizona and former rector of St. Mark's Church in-the-Bowery in New York was elected by the Vestry in May 2026 to be the first Dean since the church formally became the Diocesan Cathedral (ending the Pro-Cathedral time).

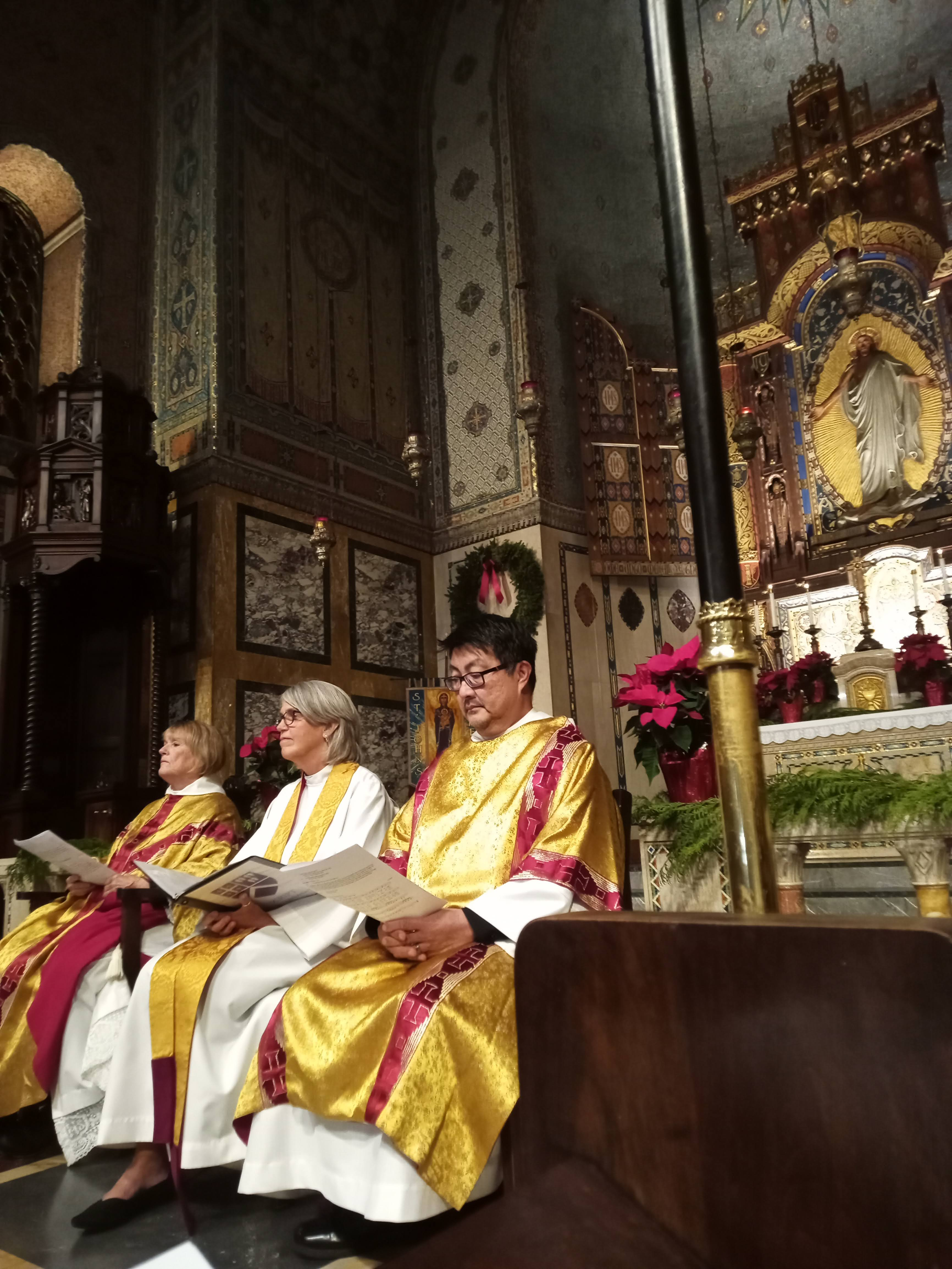
Clergy on Christmas Morning leading a small eucharist in the High Altar

== Rectors ==
- The Rev. H. O. Judd, May 6, 1890–May 1891
- The Rev. Benjamin Walter Rogers Tayler, December 13, 1891–April 17, 1903
- The Rev. Lawrence B. Ridgely, May 31, 1903–April 23, 1905
- The Rev. Lewis Grouverneur Morris, September 10, 1905–October 1912
- The Rev. George Davidson, April 1913–October 1, 1951
- The Rev. Ray Holder, December 1951–August 15, 1955
- The Rev. Robert Quayle Kennaugh, December 1955–1958
- The Rev. E. Lawrence Carter, 1958–1974
- The Rt. Rev. William D. Persell, 1973–1982
- The Rev. Warner Traynham, 1982?–2001
- The Rev. Lyn Collins, 2001-2006(est.)
- The Very Rev. Mark Kowalewski, 2006–2022
- The Very Rev. Daniel Ade, 2010–2022
- The Rt. Rev. C. Franklin Brookhart Jr., Bishop-in-Charge 2022-2023
- The Very Rev. Anne Sawyer, interim dean, February 2023-2026
- The Very Rev. Anne Sawyer, Dean, May 2026 - Currently.

== See also ==
- List of the Episcopal cathedrals of the United States
- List of cathedrals in the United States
- National Register of Historic Places listings in Los Angeles
- List of Los Angeles Historic-Cultural Monuments in South Los Angeles
