= Frederick H. Borsch =

American bishop (1935–2017)

The Right Reverend Frederick Houk Borsch
- Bishop of Los Angeles
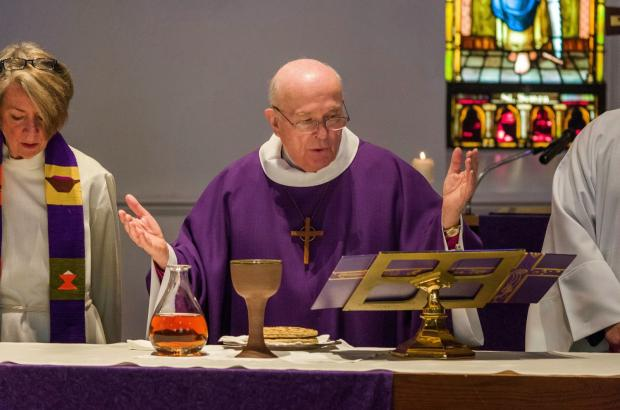
- Church: Episcopal Church
- Diocese: Los Angeles
- Elected: January 8, 1988
- In office: 1988–2002
- Predecessor: Robert C. Rusack
- Successor: J. Jon Bruno

Orders
- Ordination: 1960
- Consecration: 1988 by Edmond L. Browning

Personal details
- Born: September 13, 1935 Oak Park, Illinois, United States
- Died: April 11, 2017 (aged 81) Philadelphia, Pennsylvania, United States
- Denomination: Anglican
- Parents: Reuben Borsch & Pearl Houk
- Spouse: Barbara Edgeley Sampson (m. 1960)
- Children: 3
- Education: Princeton University

Frederick Houk Borsch (September 13, 1935 – April 11, 2017) was the Episcopal bishop of Los Angeles from 1988 to 2002, then served as interim dean of the Berkeley Divinity School at Yale University and chair of Anglican studies at the Lutheran Theological Seminary at Philadelphia.

== Biography ==
Remembered particularly for the development of Spanish-speaking congregations, the founding of the Episcopal Urban Intern Program (Episcopal Service Corps), his leadership in environmental stewardship, the building of the Cathedral Center of St. Paul, and advocacy for poverty-wage workers and the living wage while bishop in Los Angeles, he also served for twelve years as the chair of the House of Bishops' Theology Committee and as a member of the design and steering teams for the 1988 and 1998 Lambeth Conferences, chairing the section "Called to be a Faithful Church in a Plural World" in 1998. Working with the Standing Commission on Human Affairs, he helped the General Convention of 1994 to include in the church's canons sexual orientation in the non-discriminatory clauses for ordination. When George L. Carey, the Archbishop of Canterbury, visited a store-front ministry for undocumented refugees in 1996 in the impoverished MacArthur Park neighborhood of Los Angeles, Borsch made sure that the Archbishop knew that the priest who founded the ministry, Philip Lance, was gay.

Educated at Princeton, Oxford and the General Theological Seminary, his Ph.D. degree is from the University of Birmingham in England. In addition to teaching posts in England, at Seabury-Western Theological Seminary and the General Theological Seminary, he was a dean, president, and professor of New Testament at the Church Divinity School of the Pacific. He was dean of the chapel with rank of professor of religion at Princeton University (1981–1988; again interim in 2007) where he taught in the program in the History, Archaeology and Religions of the Ancient World.

Since 2013, Borsch has been listed on the advisory council of the National Center for Science Education.

Borsch died on April 11, 2017, due to complications from myelodysplastic syndrome. He was 81.

== Published works ==
Contributor of essays, articles and poetry to a number of journal and newspapers, he has been a conference leader and given university and seminary lectures at institutions in this country and abroad. In 1985, for thirteen weeks, he was the preacher for the Protestant Hour.

Among his more than twenty books are

- Keeping Faith at Princeton: A Brief History of Religious Pluralism at Princeton and Other Universities. Princeton University Press. 2012. ISBN 978-0-691-14573-0.;
- Parade: Poems of Dark and Light Alike (2010)
- Our First Atom Bomb: An All-American Story (2009)
- Introducing the Lessons of the Church Year (1978: new and 3rd ed. 2009)
- Day by Day; Loving God More Dearly (2009)
- The Spirit Searches Everything: Keeping Life's Questions. Cowley Publications. 2005. ISBN 978-1-56101-226-8.
- The Magic Word (2001)
- Outrage and Hope: A Bishop's Reflections in Times of Change and Challenge. A&C Black. 1996. ISBN 978-1-56338-170-6.
- Christian Discipleship and Sexuality (1993)
- The Bible's Authority in Today's Church (ed. 1993)
- Many Things in Parables (1988)
- Jesus: the Human Life of God (1987)
- Anglicanism and The Bible, "The Anglican Studies Series" (ed. 1984)
- Power and Weakness* (1983)
- Coming Together in the Spirit (1980)
- God's Parable (1975)
- The Christian and Gnostic Son of Man. S.C.M. Press. 1970. ISBN 978-0-334-00183-6.
- The Son of Man in Myth and History (1967)
