= J. Jon Bruno =

American episcopal bishop (1946–2021)

The Right Reverend J. Jon Bruno
- Bishop of Los Angeles
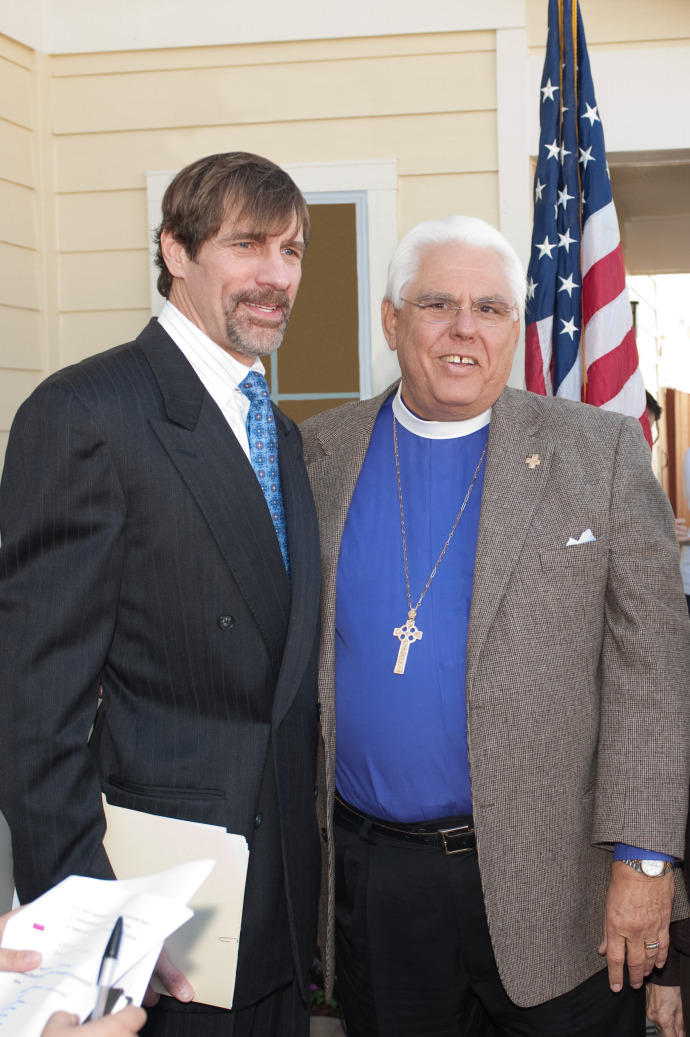
- Bruno (right) with Henry Nicholas at a Habitat for Humanity worksite, 2010
- Church: Episcopal Church
- Diocese: Los Angeles
- In office: 2002–2017
- Predecessor: Frederick H. Borsch
- Successor: John H. Taylor
- Previous post: Coadjutor Bishop of Los Angeles (2000-2002)

Orders
- Ordination: 1978 by Robert C. Rusack
- Consecration: April 29, 2000 by Richard L. Shimpfky

Personal details
- Born: November 17, 1946 Los Angeles, California, United States
- Died: April 23, 2021 (aged 74) La Quinta, California, United States
- Denomination: Anglican
- Parents: Dorothy & Joseph Bruno
- Spouse: Mary A. Bruno
- Children: 2

Joseph Jon Bruno (November 17, 1946 – April 23, 2021) was the sixth Episcopal Bishop of Episcopal Diocese of Los Angeles. He died on April 23, 2021, of natural causes.

== Early life and education ==
Joseph Jon Bruno was born in Los Angeles on November 17, 1946, to Dorothy and Joseph J. Bruno. Together with his sister, Bruno was raised as a Roman Catholic in Los Angeles and attended local city schools.

Bruno held a license in criminology from California State University, Long Beach (1972) and a bachelor's degree in physical education from the California State University, Los Angeles (1974). He held a Master of Divinity degree (1977) from the Virginia Theological Seminary, which also awarded him an honorary Doctor of Divinity degree in 2001.

Bruno was a police officer in the city of Burbank, California. He was also briefly a professional football player under contract to the Denver Broncos before an injury sustained early on prevented further activity with the team.

== Priesthood ==
Bruno was ordained to the priesthood in 1978 in the Diocese of Los Angeles by its fourth bishop, the Rt. Rev. Robert Claflin Rusack.

From 1977 to 1979, Bruno was a parish associate at St. Patrick's Church in Thousand Oaks, California. He was an associate at St. Mary's Church in Eugene, Oregon from 1979 to 1980, while concurrently vicar of St. Teresa's in Junction City, Oregon. He was active both in building church facilities and new congregations. In 1980, he left St. Mary's to help form St. Matthew's Church, also in Eugene, where he served as vicar for several years before returning to California. From 1983 to 1986, he was an associate at St. Paul's Church in Pomona, California.

He was named rector of St. Athanasius' Parish in 1986, and there collaborated with Bishop Borsch in the construction of the Cathedral Center on the parish's lakefront site in the Echo Park district of Los Angeles. As pastor of this congregation, Bruno continued his advocacy for youth and families, for gang diversion, and for immigration equity, and worked in the wider sphere of human rights. He was an advocate for the ordination to the priesthood of his curate, Philip Lance, who was the first male homosexual in the Episcopal Church to be acknowledged as openly gay prior to his ordination in January 1988.

He served for eight years as Provost of the Cathedral Center of St. Paul, Los Angeles and as pastor to its multilingual congregation of St. Athanasius, which dates from 1864 as the oldest Episcopal parish in southern California. While provost, Bruno chaired the board of the Episcopal Community Federal Credit Union. He was vice-chair of the Nehemiah West Housing Corporation, which has built 300 single-family dwellings for purchase by low- and moderate-income families.

Bruno was elected Bishop Coadjutor of the Diocese of Los Angeles on November 13, 1999. Within Episcopal Church polity, a bishop coadjutor is elected to succeed a diocesan bishop at such time as the latter chooses to retire.

From 1990 to 1993, Bruno served the Diocese of Los Angeles as its missioner for stewardship and development. He was an elected deputy to the national church's 2000 General Convention, having assisted in the convention's operations and security services for several years.

He is the founder of the Institute for Urban Research and Development, the work of which is now related to Episcopal Housing and Economic Development, an institution of the Diocese of Los Angeles.

As bishop, Bruno has launched the "Hands in Healing" initiative for education and action related to eradicating violence in local, regional, national, and international contexts.

Bruno was a member of the wider Episcopal Church's Executive Council, as well as the Los Angeles Council of Religious Leaders. He was board chairman and honorary chairman of various diocesan institutions.

== Bishop ==
Bruno was ordained to the episcopate on April 29, 2000, in a liturgy at the Los Angeles Convention Center. He was seated on February 1, 2002, surrounded by more than 1,000 Episcopalians and guests who joined hands around Echo Park Lake.

Bruno is the first native Angeleno to be elected as bishop of the Diocese of Los Angeles, which was established in 1895.

== Misconduct charges ==
On May 17, 2015, Bruno announced to parishioners of St. James the Great, Newport Beach, that he had sold the church for $15 million to Legacy Partners Residential Development to be re-developed into 22 luxury townhomes. After dispute and protests from the church's parishioners over their will to remain an active parish and deed restrictions, on June 26, 2015, Bruno sued the original donor of the land of the church, the Griffith Company of Irvine, California, for title slander. On June 29, 2015, representatives of the Diocese of Los Angeles changed the locks of St. James the Great, Newport Beach, so that parishioners could no longer access the church.

In response, the congregation, which continued to worship outdoors near the vacant church, filed a misconduct complaint against Bruno with the national church.

On June 29, 2017, the Most Reverend Michael Curry, Presiding Bishop of the Episcopal Church, placed a "Partial Restriction on the Ministry of a Bishop" on the Rt. Rev. Jon Bruno of the Diocese of Los Angeles. During the period of the restriction, the Bishop, acting individually, or as Bishop Diocesan, or as Corporate Sole, or in any other capacity, is forbidden from closing on the sale of the St. James property, or otherwise selling or conveying the property or contracting to sell the property, or, in any way assisting in the sale or conveyance of the property.

On August 3, 2017, the Hearing Panel issued a final order, finding that Bishop Bruno had violated the Episcopal Canons, by selling the St. James property without standing committee approval, by misrepresentations about St. James and its congregation, and by conduct unbecoming of a member of the clergy. The Hearing Panel recommended that Bishop Bruno be suspended from his position and from all ministry for a period of three years.

== Church and philosophy ==
The Episcopal Church in the Diocese of Los Angeles serves 70,000 Episcopalians in 148 congregations located in Los Angeles, Orange, San Bernardino, Santa Barbara, and Ventura counties, and part of Riverside County. Served by some 400 clergy, the diocese also includes over 40 Episcopal schools and some 20 social-service and chaplaincy institutions.

The diocese promotes affordable housing and entrepreneurship in Southern California through the Episcopal Housing Alliance and Economic Development. A major project is Chefs Center of California, a small-business incubator in Pasadena, California, that enables culinary entrepreneurs to start and accelerate the successful growth of their enterprises. Primary financial support for the Chefs Center is provided by the Henry T. Nicholas III Foundation, which has contributed $1,350,000 to the incubator.

Bruno, in collaboration with the Reverend Bryan Jones of Long Beach, published a full-page advertisement in the Los Angeles Times's "California" section, on July 23, 2006. Titled Open Hearted, Open Minded Christianity, the tract called for an inclusive Christianity based on loving God and loving one's neighbor as oneself. With Malcolm Boyd, Bruno is co-author of the book In Times Like These: How We Pray (New York: Church Publishing, 2005).

== Death ==
Bruno died suddenly of natural causes at his home in La Quinta, California on April 23, 2021.

== See also ==
- List of Episcopal bishops of the United States
- Historical list of the Episcopal bishops of the United States

Episcopal Church (USA) titles
Preceded by Frederick Borsch	6th Bishop of Los Angeles; February 1, 2002 – 2017	Succeeded by John Taylor
