= Donald J. Campbell =

Canadian-born American Episcopal prelate

Donald James Campbell (January 1, 1903 - November 24, 1973) was a Canadian-born American prelate of the Episcopal Church who served as the second Suffragan Bishop of Los Angeles from 1949 until his resignation in 1959.

== Early life and education ==
Campbell was born in Collingwood, Ontario, Canada, on January 1, 1903, the son of Major Richard G. Campbell and Agnes Jackson Smith. He was educated at the High School in Victoria, British Columbia. He also studied at Berkeley Divinity School in New Haven, Connecticut, and the Episcopal Theological School in Cambridge, Massachusetts from where he graduated with a Bachelor of Divinity in 1932. He also earned a Master of Theology from the University of Southern California in 1939. He was also awarded honorary degrees from the Church Divinity School of the Pacific in 1949 and from Occidental College in 1954. He married Hester Hocking on June 15, 1934 and together had three children.

== Ordained ministry ==
Campbell was ordained deacon in November 1931 by Bishop Henry Knox Sherrill of Massachusetts and priest in July 1932 by Bishop W. Bertrand Stevens of Los Angeles. He initially served as curate at St Paul's Cathedral in Los Angeles from 1932 to 1933 and then assistant at St Paul's Church in New Haven, Connecticut from 1933 to 1935. In 1935 he accepted the position of rector of rector of the Church of the Redeemer in Providence, Rhode Island, while in 1943 he was appointed Dean of Christ Church Cathedral in Springfield, Massachusetts, a post he retained until 1949.

== Episcopacy ==
On October 21, 1948, Campbell was elected on the second ballot as Suffragan Bishop of Los Angeles during a special convention held in St Paul's Cathedral in Lod Angeles. He was consecrated on January 25, 1949. On November 1, 1959, Campbell resigned his episcopacy in favor of a position at the Episcopal Theological School in Cambridge, Massachusetts.
