= Francis Eric Bloy =

English-American bishop

The Right Reverend Francis Eric Bloy D.D., S.T.D.
- Bishop of Los Angeles
- Church: Episcopal Church
- Diocese: Los Angeles
- Elected: January 1948
- In office: 1948–1973
- Predecessor: W. Bertrand Stevens
- Successor: Robert C. Rusack

Orders
- Ordination: June 1929 by John Gardner Murray
- Consecration: April 21, 1948 by Henry St. George Tucker

Personal details
- Born: December 17, 1904 Birchington-on-Sea, England
- Died: May 23, 1993 (aged 88) Los Angeles, California, United States
- Buried: Forest Lawn Memorial Park (Glendale)
- Denomination: Anglican
- Parents: Francis Joseph Field Bloy & Alice Mary Pointer
- Spouse: Frances Forbes Cox (m. 1929; died 1974)

Francis Eric Irving Bloy (December 17, 1904 - May 23, 1993) served as the third Episcopal Bishop of Los Angeles from April 21, 1948, until December 31, 1973.

== Biography ==
Bloy was born in Birchington, England as the son and grandson of Anglican priests. His family moved to the U.S. when he was age seven. He attended high school in Arizona and continued his studies at the University of Arizona before transferring to the University of Missouri. He hoped to become a diplomat and entered the Georgetown University School of Foreign Service. However, he later decided to enter the clergy and enrolled in the Virginia Theological Seminary. In June 1928 he was ordained deacon by Bishop Frederick Foote Johnson of Missouri. In 1929, Bloy graduated from the seminary, married Frances Forbes Cox and was ordained priest in June by Presiding Bishop John Gardner Murray. He also became pastor of All Saints' Church in Reisterstown, Maryland where he served four years. At his ordination, he became the fifth generation of clergy in his family.

In 1933, Bloy and his wife moved to La Jolla, California where he joined the staff of St. James Church. He became Dean of St. Paul's Cathedral in Los Angeles in 1937 and held the post for 11 years until he was named bishop of Los Angeles.

At the time of his consecration, the diocese had 70,000 members and when he retired, the membership had doubled and he had overseen the creation of 42 new churches and a diocesan budget that grown 400 percent. After the Watts Riots, the bishop helped provide funding for youth of the area to establish an auto repair shop.

In 1958, he was instrumental in establishing an extension campus in Los Angeles of the Church Divinity School of the Pacific (CDSP) for students unable to study at the school's Berkeley campus. When CDSP was unable to continue funding the extension in 1962, Bloy had the Diocese assume control of the school and in 1970 merged it with the Claremont School of Theology. The resulting institution was renamed Bloy House and continues to provide training for Episcopal clergy.

Bloy taught himself Sanskrit and became an authority on Eastern religions. He also enjoyed astronomy and fishing. In planning for his retirement, he and his wife purchased a home in the hills overlooking Pasadena so he could stargaze from his yard, however Mrs. Bloy died within two weeks of his retirement date. The Bloys had no children.
