= Lucena (disambiguation) =

Lucena is the capital city of the province of Quezon, Philippines. Lucena may also refer to:

== Places ==
=== Brazil ===
- Lucena, Paraíba, a municipality in the state of Paraíba in the Northeast Region
- Porto Lucena, a municipality in the state of Rio Grande do Sul
- Presidente Lucena, a municipality in the state of Rio Grande do Sul

=== Philippines ===
- New Lucena, a fourth class municipality in the province of Iloilo

=== Spain ===
- Lucena, Córdoba, a municipality in the province of Córdoba, in the autonomous community of Andalusia
- Lucena de Jalón, a municipality located in the province of Zaragoza, in the autonomous community of Aragon
- Lucena del Cid, a municipality in the comarca of Alcalatén, province of Castellon, in the autonomous community of Valencian Community
- Lucena del Puerto, a municipality located in the province of Huelva, in the autonomous community of Andalusia

== People ==
- Lucena (surname), including a list of persons with the surname

== Others ==
- Luis Ramírez de Lucena (1460s–1530s), 15th century chess player
- Lucena position, a chess position incorrectly named after Luis Ramírez de Lucena
- Lucena, a genus of moths in the family Sphingidae described by Rambur in 1840, but now considered to be a synonym of Mimas
- Lucena CF, a Spanish football team based in Lucena, in the province of Córdoba, in the autonomous community of Andalusia
