= John H. Taylor (bishop) =

American Episcopal priest

The Right Reverend John H. Taylor
- Bishop of Los Angeles
- Church: Episcopal Church
- Province: Province 8 of the Episcopal Church
- Diocese: Los Angeles
- See: St. John's Cathedral (Los Angeles)
- Elected: December 3, 2016
- In office: 2017 to 2026
- Predecessor: J. Jon Bruno
- Successor: Antonio Gallardo
- Previous post: Coadjutor Bishop of Los Angeles (2016)

Orders
- Ordination: June 7, 2003 (deacon); January 24, 2004 (priest) by J. Jon Bruno
- Consecration: July 8, 2017 by Michael Bruce Curry

Personal details
- Born: John Harvey Taylor; October 26, 1954 (age 72) Detroit, Michigan, U.S.
- Denomination: Anglicanism
- Spouse: Kathleen H. O'Connor (m. 2002)
- Children: 2
- Education: Claremont School of Theology; University of California, San Diego
- Motto: "Feeding hungry hearts"

John Harvey Taylor (born October 26, 1954) served as the seventh Bishop of Los Angeles in the Diocese of Los Angeles of the Episcopal Church.

Taylor was a chief of staff to former U.S. President Richard Nixon and served as the executive director of the Richard Nixon Library & Birthplace Foundation. Taylor had served as director of the privately owned and funded Richard Nixon Library and Birthplace prior to it joining the federal presidential libraries system, and becoming the Richard Nixon Presidential Library.

Taylor was ordained as an Episcopal priest and served as the vicar of St. John's Episcopal Church and School, located in Rancho Santa Margarita, Orange County, California. In December 2016, he was elected to serve as bishop coadjutor of the Episcopal Diocese of Los Angeles. In 2017 he succeeded J. Jon Bruno as diocesan bishop.

== Early life and career ==
Born in Detroit, Michigan, Taylor held a position as a newspaper reporter. He later moved to California and worked for former president Richard Nixon in 1979. He became the former president's post-chief of staff in 1984 and served in that role until 1990. Taylor married Kathy O'Connor in 2002. O'Conner had served as Nixon's post-Chief of Staff from 1990 until the former president's death in 1994.

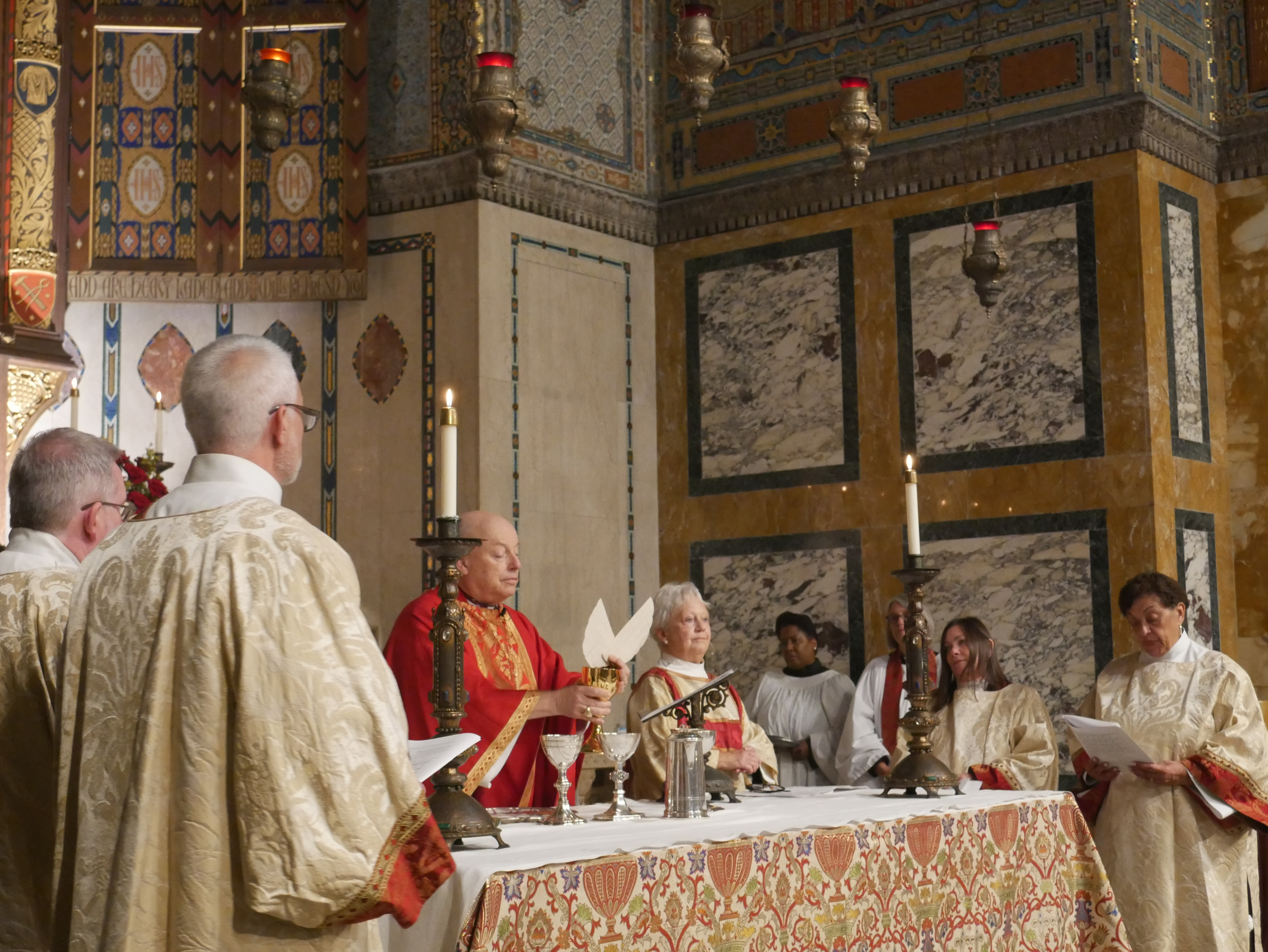
Taylor leading an Eucharist at Saint John's Cathedral in Los Angeles.

== Director of the Nixon Library ==
Taylor was appointed director of the Richard Nixon Library and Birthplace while still working for the former president. His tenure consisted of the growth and expansion of the library, as well as the fostering and preservation of Nixon's presidential legacy. In 1999, Taylor sought to enhance the former's president's image when he authorized the release of 124 Nixon-era White House tapes regarding the Watergate scandal and Nixon's involvement in it. Taylor acknowledged, "The entire record of Watergate needs to be viewed through the prism of [the] Vietnam [War] ... Richard Nixon was a war-time president. He will still be criticized for his actions but the criticism will be fairer when viewed in that light."

A controversy erupted in 1996, however, between Taylor and Nixon's daughters, Tricia Nixon Cox and Julie Nixon Eisenhower. Taylor had requested that control of the library be taken from the Nixon family and placed with a 24-member board of directors. Both sisters were opposed, although Julie Nixon Eisenhower changed her position and supported Taylor's notion; control was eventually granted to Taylor after a legal battle. During that period, a plan to reunite the president's scattered records was undertaken, but largely fell apart due to a court case regarding a $14 million donation from Bebe Rebozo, a close friend of Nixon and his wife. The issue was resolved, beginning in 2003, when the United States Congress voted to repeal a law that prevented Nixon and his family from controlling presidential records dating from 1969 to 1974. Taylor labeled it as "a first step in abolishing the anomaly" of Nixon being the only president between Herbert Hoover and Bill Clinton without a government-operated library.

During his time as director, Taylor was paid $145,500 in 2000, the highest of any director of a presidential library. President Dwight D. Eisenhower's grandson, and son-in-law to Nixon, David Eisenhower, said of Taylor's job performance, "It's a very well-run library, and John Taylor is a phenomenal director."

=== Nixon Library Foundation ===
Taylor served as director of the library until July 11, 2007, when the National Archives and Records Administration took full control of it; this included replacing Taylor as director with Timothy Naftali, a presidential historian. As executive director of the foundation, Taylor's position remained similar to that of which he previously held, although the foundation is only responsible for Nixon's pre- and post-presidential papers, library grounds, and event space; the National Archives controls the exhibits themselves.

Taylor announced his resignation in February 2009.

== Ordained ministry ==
Taylor was ordained as an Episcopal priest in January 2004, after studying at the Episcopal Theological School at Claremont. He was subsequently named vicar of St. John's Episcopal Church and School in Rancho Santa Margarita, California, in 2004 by the Right Reverend J. Jon Bruno. On December 3, 2016, he was elected bishop coadjutor of the Episcopal Diocese of Los Angeles.

In March 2023, Taylor christened Princess Lilibet of Sussex, a granddaughter of King Charles III of the United Kingdom.

Taylor would retire as Bishop of Los Angeles summer 2026, but would remain as an assistant bishop in the Diocese of Los Angeles

== See also ==
- List of Episcopal bishops of the United States
- Historical list of the Episcopal bishops of the United States
