= Cathedral Center of St. Paul, Los Angeles =

Church in California, US

Coordinates: 34.07349°N 118.25907°W

St. Paul's Commons (formerly the Cathedral Center of St. Paul) is the administrative and ministry hub of the six-county Episcopal Diocese of Los Angeles.

Its central church is home to the Congregation of St. Athanasius, which dates from 1864 and is the oldest Episcopal church in Southern California, and the oldest continuing Episcopal church in Los Angeles. The congregation conducts services in English and Spanish. The congregation is named for Athanasius, the 4th-century Bishop of Alexandria known for his ministry in a widely secular society. The Cathedral Center was built on the site of the old St. Athanasius church building.

== Site and functions ==
Located in the Echo Park district near downtown Los Angeles, St. Paul's Commons houses community-outreach programs ranging from the Episcopal Community Federal Credit Union to the weekly food distribution program. Part of the Episcopal Church, St. Paul's Commons also houses the offices of the bishops and diocesan staff and regularly hosts retreats and other events for interfaith and community groups.

St. Paul's Commons was consecrated October 22, 1994 (as the Cathedral Center of St. Paul), on its current site, 840 Echo Park Avenue, where Episcopal parish ministry has been conducted since 1917.

Previous diocesan administrative buildings have included St. Paul's Cathedral, built in 1923 on Figueroa Street north of Wilshire Boulevard and demolished in 1980 after earthquake damage; St. Paul's Pro-Cathedral, built in 1883 on Olive Street and sold in 1922 to make way for the Biltmore Hotel. The original 1865 St. Athanasius' Church, located on New High Street and Temple, just northeast of L.A.'s current City Hall.

== Current status ==
In 2007, Bishop J. Jon Bruno designated St. John's Episcopal Church, 514 W. Adams Boulevard in Los Angeles, as the Pro-Cathedral of the Diocese of Los Angeles. Built in 1925 and a city landmark, St. John's Cathedral serves the diocese as the site of larger liturgical gatherings. In 2019, to clarify the role of St. John's Cathedral, the Cathedral Center in Echo Park was renamed St. Paul's Commons under the leadership of Bishop John Harvey Taylor.
