= St. James' Episcopal Church (South Pasadena, California) =

Church in South Pasadena, California

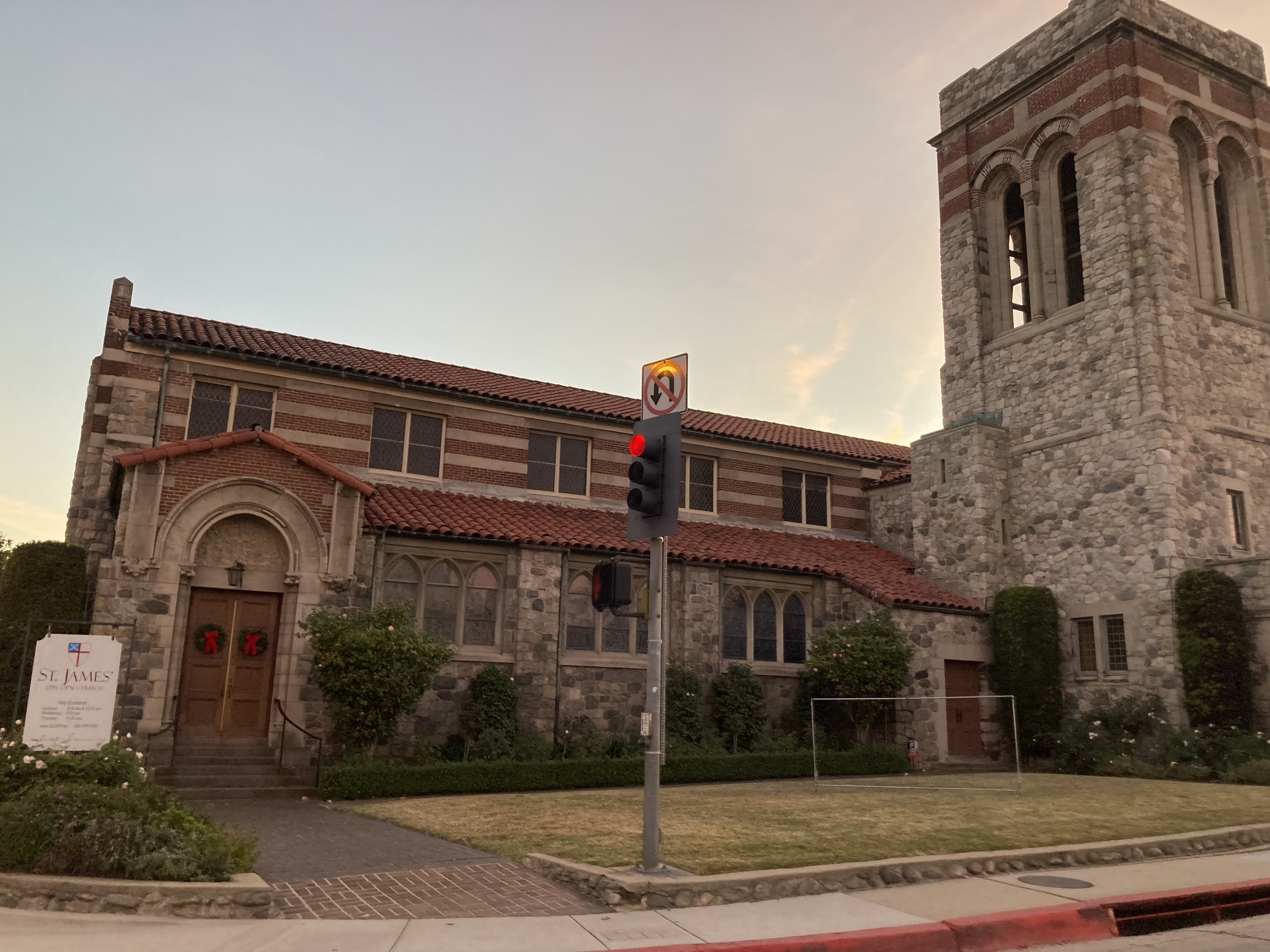
- St. James' Episcopal Church in 2022

- Location within Los Angeles County St. James' Episcopal Church (California) St. James' Episcopal Church (the United States)
- 34.1116991°N 118.153701°W
- Location: 1325 Monterey Road, South Pasadena, California
- Country: United States
- Language: English
- Denomination: Episcopal
- Tradition: High Church Anglicanism
- Churchmanship: Central churchmanship
- Website: www.sjcsp.org

History
- Status: Church
- Dedicated: May 19, 1907

Architecture
- Functional status: Active
- Architect(s): Bertram Goodhue of Cram, Goodhue and Ferguson
- Style: Gothic Revival; Romanesque Revival
- Years built: 1907

Administration
- Province: Province VIII
- Diocese: Episcopal Diocese of Los Angeles

Clergy
- Rector: Rev. Robin Kassabian (Interim)

St. James' Episcopal Church is a parish of the Episcopal Church in South Pasadena, California, and part of the Episcopal Diocese of Los Angeles.

== History ==
The church began informally in 1890 as St. Andrews Mission, with support from All Saints Episcopal Church in nearby Pasadena. In 1905, a temporary structure was built on the corner of Monterey Road and Fremont Avenue, where the current church would be later built.

== Building ==
The historic church was designed by chief architect Bertram Goodhue of Cram, Goodhue and Ferguson in a mix of Gothic Revival and Romanesque Revival architectural styles. The church is #33 on South Pasadena's list of historic landmarks. The stained glass windows were made by Judson Studios.

In 1919, a $3,000 (equivalent to $56,000 in 2025) addition was started, which included a stage and dressing rooms. The chimes were donated to the building by aviator Pancho Barnes, who, on January 5, 1921, had married Rev. C. Rankin Barnes at the church.

The tower was damaged in the 1987 Whittier Narrows earthquake. When the tower was repaired and retrofitted to meet earthquake protection standards, the chapel's pillars were narrowed, which had been obstructing views of the front of the church from rear pews.

== Notable events ==
The church was the site of the 1929 wedding of actress Bessie Love to William Hawks, attended by such celebrities as Ronald Colman and William Powell, mobbed by a crowd of 25,000, and documented in Cecil Beaton's Diaries.
