= Joseph Horsfall Johnson =

Bishop of Los Angeles

The Right Reverend Joseph Horsfall Johnson D.D.
- Bishop of Los Angeles
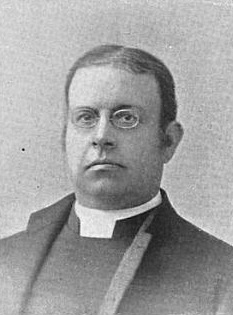
- Bishop-elect Johnson in 1895
- Church: Episcopal Church
- Diocese: Los Angeles
- Elected: December 3, 1895
- In office: 1896–1928
- Successor: W. Bertrand Stevens

Orders
- Ordination: June 29, 1873 (deacon); May 29, 1874 (priest) by Horatio Potter
- Consecration: February 24, 1896 by Thomas Frederick Davies

Personal details
- Born: June 7, 1847 Schenectady, New York, United States
- Died: May 16, 1928 (aged 80) Pasadena, California, United States
- Buried: San Gabriel Cemetery, San Gabriel, California
- Denomination: Anglicanism
- Parents: Stephen H. Johnson & Eleanor Horsfall
- Spouse: Isabel Green Davis (m. 1881)
- Children: Reginald Davis Johnson
- Education: Williams College

Joseph Horsfall Johnson (June 7, 1847- May 16, 1928) was the first Bishop of Los Angeles in The Episcopal Church.

== Early life and education ==
Johnson was born on June 7, 1847 in Schenectady, New York, the son of Stephen Hotchkiss Johnson and Eleanor Horsfall. He studied at Williams College and graduated with a Bachelor of Arts in 1870. He then enrolled at the General Theological Seminary from where he graduated in 1873. He was awarded with a Doctor of Divinity from Nashotah House in 1895, and a Doctor of Sacred Theology from the General Theological Seminary in 1908.

== Ordained ministry ==
Johnson was ordained deacon on June 29, 1873 at the Church of the Transfiguration, and priest on May 29, 1874 in the chapel of the House of Mercy in New York City by Bishop Horatio Potter. He was in charge of Holy Trinity Church in Highland, New York from 1873 to 1879. He then became rector of Trinity Church in Bristol, Rhode Island between 1879 and 1881, and then of St Peter’s Church in The Bronx from 1881 until 1886. He then served as rector of Christ Church in Detroit between 1886 and 1896.

== Episcopacy ==
On December 3, 1895 Johnson was elected as the first Bishop of Los Angeles and was consecrated on February 24, 1896 by Bishop Thomas Frederick Davies of Michigan. He founded The Bishop's School in La Jolla, California and served on the Pomona College board of trustees. The Bishop Johnson College of Nursing at Good Samaritan Hospital was named for him. He was the father of architect Reginald Davis Johnson.
