= St. Luke's Episcopal Church (Long Beach, California) =

- Parroquia San Lucas, Long Beach
- St. Luke's Episcopal Church
- 33.7755°N 118.1853°W
- Country: USA
- Language(s): English & Spanish
- Denomination: Episcopal
- Churchmanship: Broad church to low church
- Website: www.stlukeslb.org

History
- Founded: June 27, 1897
- Founder: Rev. Jane Gould

Architecture
- Architect: C.T. McGrew
- Architectural type: Gothic Revival
- Completed: July 15, 1933

Administration
- Province: VIII
- Diocese: Episcopal Diocese of Los Angeles

Clergy
- Bishop: John H. Taylor
- Priest: Rev. Beryl Nyre-Thomas

St Luke's is a parish of the Episcopal Church in downtown Long Beach, California. A member of the Episcopal Diocese of Los Angeles, St Luke's has a historic reputation for upholding progressive social ideals and serving the community. The Church is a registered historic building on the corner of 7th Street and Atlantic Avenue.

== Construction and Architecture ==
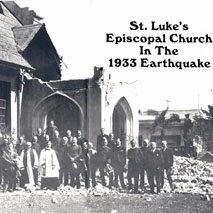
St Luke's after 1933 Earthquake.

Located at 525 E. 7th St. in the City of Long Beach, St. Luke's Episcopal Church has been a center of religious, social and cultural activities in Long Beach since a church was first built on this site in 1917. After being destroyed by the 1933 earthquake, the rebuilding of the church in the English Gothic Revival style demonstrated the commitment of church leaders in the face of disaster. The Reverend Perry G.M. Austin, rector of the church during this time, mobilized nationwide support for the rebuilding of the church. Famous donors included Eleanor Roosevelt, J. P. Morgan, Felix duPont, Judge Augustus Hand and Senator Walter G. McAdoo. The cornerstone for the rebuilding was laid on March 19, 1934, just a year and nine days after the earthquake.

== LGBT Advocacy ==
St Luke's is a well known advocate of LGBTQ+ issues in Southern California. Every year, as a part of Long Beach's pride parade, St Luke's holds a Mass on the bluffs above the ocean worship service to help kick off the event. In October 2010, in the wake of a wave of LGBT suicides brought on by harassment, St Luke's held a community-wide Coming Out Celebration. The event promoted an inclusive theology, meant to reassure the LGBT community that they have Christian support.

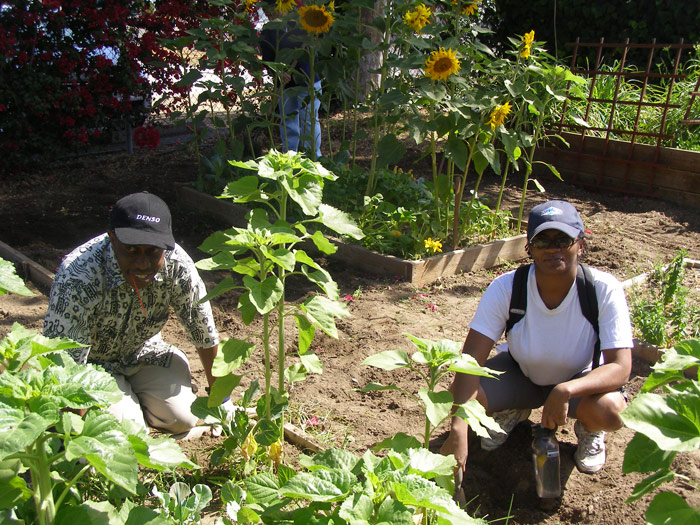
Parishioners Working in the Garden

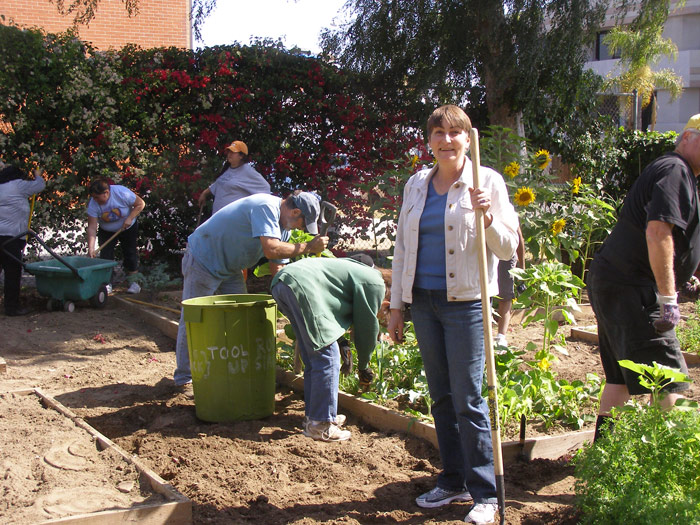
Community Work Day

== New Sanctuary Movement and Immigration Advocacy ==
In 2007 St Luke's made national headlines by providing sanctuary, in the face of strong governmental and outside pressure, to an undocumented woman facing deportation and separation from her US citizen family and young children. St. Luke's has been a notable face of the New Sanctuary Movement. As a part of this movement, congregations maintain that the immigration system mistreats immigrants and breaks families apart. They seek to end raids of job sites that have led to the arrest of thousands of undocumented workers, and lobby for policies that would help keep the families of illegal immigrants together in the United States.

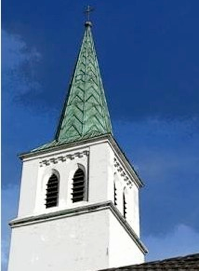
Spire

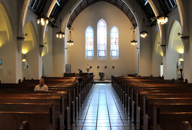
Sanctuary

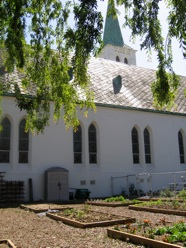
Garden

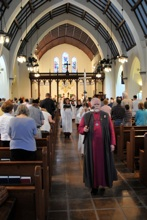
Procession

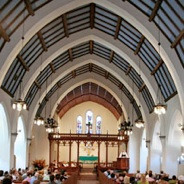
Altar

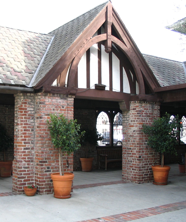
Entrance
