= Rafael Marques (footballer, born 1989) =

Portuguese footballer

Personal information
- Full name: Rafael Lucena Marques
- Date of birth: 11 September 1989 (age 37)
- Height: 1.87 m (6 ft 1 1/2 in)
- Position: Goalkeeper

Youth career
- 2003–2007: Alverca
- 2007–2008: Olivais e Moscavide

Senior career*
Years	Team	Apps	(Gls)
2008–2010	Olivais e Moscavide		
2010–2012	Oriental		
2013–2015	Sintrense	63	(0)
2015–2017	Oriental	11	(0)
2017–2020	Casa Pia	58	(0)
2020–2021	Loures	19	(0)
- * Club domestic league appearances and goals as of 20:32, 29 August 2024 (UTC)

Rafael Lucena Marques (born 11 September 1989) is a Portuguese football player.

== Club career ==
He made his professional debut in the Segunda Liga for Oriental on 20 September 2015 in a game against Desportivo Aves.
