= W. Bertrand Stevens =

American bishop

The Right Reverend William Bertrand Stevens D.D.
- Bishop of Los Angeles
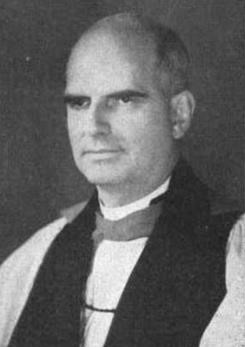
- Church: Episcopal Church
- Diocese: Los Angeles
- Elected: April 7, 1920
- In office: 1928–1947
- Predecessor: Joseph Horsfall Johnson
- Successor: Francis Eric Bloy
- Previous post: Coadjutor Bishop of Los Angeles (1920-1928)

Orders
- Ordination: June 11, 1911 by David H. Greer
- Consecration: October 12, 1920 by Joseph Horsfall Johnson

Personal details
- Born: November 19, 1884 Lewiston, Maine, United States
- Died: August 22, 1947 (aged 62) Los Angeles, California, United States
- Buried: San Gabriel Cemetery, San Gabriel, California
- Denomination: Anglican
- Spouse: Violet Heathcote Bond (m. 1911)
- Children: 4
- Education: Bates College

William Bertrand Stevens (November 19, 1884 - August 22, 1947) was second bishop of the Episcopal Diocese of Los Angeles, serving from 1928 to 1947. He had previously served as coadjutor bishop from 1920 to 1928.

== Early life and education ==
Stevens was born on November 19, 1884, in Lewiston, Maine, son of Albion Morse Stevens (1860-1926) and Ada McKenzie (1864-1947). He graduated from Bates College, then attended Cambridge Theological School and graduated in 1910 with a Bachelor of Divinity. Later he received a Master of Arts from Columbia University and a Doctor of Philosophy from New York University. He was a member of Phi Beta Kappa, Sons of the American Revolution, the Society of Colonial Wars, the Society of the Descendants of the Colonial Clergy, Phi Gamma Delta, Pi Epsilon Theta, Theta Phi, Phi Mu Alpha, the University Club in Pasadena, the Los Angeles Athletic Club, the Jonathan Club, Knights Templar, Red Cross of Constantine, Masons, and Sons of the Revolution.

== Ordained ministry ==
Stevens was ordained deacon on June 3, 1910, by Bishop William Lawrence of Massachusetts and priest on June 3, 1911, by Bishop David H. Greer of New York. He initially served as curate at Trinity Church in New York City from 1910 until 1912. He then became rector of St Ann’s Church in The Bronx between 1912 and 1917, and then rector of St Mark’s Church in San Antonio, Texas, from 1917 until 1920.

== Bishop ==
Stevens was elected Coadjutor Bishop of Los Angeles on April 7, 1920 and was consecrated at St Paul's Cathedral in Los Angeles when he was 35 years old on October 12, 1920. He succeeded as diocesan bishop on May 16, 1928. He was general chaplain for the General Society Sons of the Revolution 1940–1947.

He was a trustee of Scripps College, Occidental College, the Harvard School, and the Bishop's School. He received an honorary doctorate from UC in 1921 and Bates College in 1922. He was a Major Chaplain in the US Army Reserve, a field director for the American Red Cross, and a captain in the California Naval Militia.

== Family ==
Stevens married Violet Heathcote Bond (1883-1971). They had four daughters Ellen (Prince), Ann (McNair), Edith (Haney), and Emily (Hall).

== Death and burial ==
Stevens died in office of complications following surgery at the Good Samaritan Hospital in Los Angeles. He is buried in San Gabriel Cemetery, in San Gabriel, California.
