= Church of the Epiphany (Los Angeles) =

- U.S. National Register of Historic Places
- Los Angeles Historic-Cultural Monument
- Location within the Los Angeles metropolitan area Location within California Location within the United States
- Location: 2808 N Altura St Lincoln Heights, Los Angeles
- Coordinates: 34.0753°N 118.2129°W
- NRHP reference No.: 100004857
- LAHCM No.: 807

Significant dates
- Added to NRHP: January 6, 2020
- Designated LAHCM: June 15, 2005

The Church of the Epiphany Iglesia de La Epifania (currently: Epiphany Mission/Mision Iglesia La Epifania) is the oldest operating Episcopal church in Los Angeles. The church's campus is located at the intersection of Sichel and Altura streets in the Lincoln Heights neighborhood. In 2005 it was designated a Los Angeles Historic-Cultural Monument and added to the National Register of Historic Places in 2020.

The congregation was founded in 1887. The original church was designed in the Romanesque Revival style by English architect Ernest Coxhead. In 1913 that building was converted to the parish hall and Arthur Benton was commissioned to design a new church sanctuary. Benton's structure incorporated Gothic Revival and Mission Revival in addition to Romanesque Revival. The pipe organ was designed by Henry Pilcher & Sons of Louisville, Kentucky.

In 1968, the church served as a planning base for the East L.A. Chicano student walkouts and the Chicano Moratorium anti-Vietnam War protest. Cesar Chavez gave speeches in the parish hall and La Raza, an underground pro-Chicano newspaper, was printed in the church basement.

The non-profit Epiphany Conservation Trust was founded in 2010 to raise funds to restore the church. Restoration is being directed by the Los Angeles firm of Escher GuneWardena Architecture. Repairs began in 2011 and to date have covered structural work on the parish hall and restoration of four stained glass windows.

The Congregation has English and Spanish services but carry most ministries together in a multicultural manner, most of the Parish traditions are strongly Anglo-Catholic with a Progressive mindset, as most Episcopal churches in the county.

Currently is on a Mission status and is led by the Reverend John Watson, a native from the United Kingdom and bilingual missionary.
