= Robert C. Rusack =

American bishop

The Right Reverend Robert Claflin Rusack D.D., S.T.D.
- Bishop of Los Angeles
- Church: Episcopal Church
- Diocese: Los Angeles
- Elected: October 21, 1972
- In office: 1974–1986
- Predecessor: Francis Eric Bloy
- Successor: Frederick H. Borsch
- Previous posts: Suffragan Bishop of Los Angeles (1964-1972); Coadjutor Bishop of Los Angeles (1972-1974)

Orders
- Ordination: November 7, 1951 by Henry H. Daniels
- Consecration: September 29, 1964 by Francis Eric Bloy

Personal details
- Born: June 16, 1926 Worcester, Massachusetts, United States
- Died: July 16, 1986 (aged 60) Los Angeles, California, United States
- Buried: Pacific Palisades, Los Angeles
- Denomination: Anglican
- Parents: Roy Leonard Rusack & Dorothy Claflin
- Spouse: Janice Morrison Overfield
- Children: 2

Robert Claflin Rusack (June 16, 1926 – July 16, 1986) was the fourth bishop of Los Angeles in the Episcopal Church from 1974 until his death in 1986. He was succeeded by Frederick Borsch.

== Early life and education ==
Rusack was born on June 16, 1926, in Worcester, Massachusetts, to Roy Leonard Rusack and Dorothy Claflin. In 1947 he graduated with a B.A. from Hobart College. He also earned his Doctor of Divinity from the same college in 1970. He was a scholar at St Augustine's College, Canterbury in England between 1957 and 1958 and graduated with a Doctor of Sacred Theology from General Theological Seminary in 1965.

== Priest ==
In 1951 Rusack was ordained priest and was subsequently appointed vicar of St James's Church in Deer Lodge, Montana. In 1955 he resigned to study in England. Upon his return he became rector of St Augustine By-The-Sea Church in Santa Monica, California. Whilst there he was also responsible of the day school in his parish and also the parochial mission of St Aidan in Malibu, California.

== Bishop ==
On June 10, 1964, Rusack was elected Suffragan Bishop of Los Angeles. In 1969 he was elected Bishop of Dallas; however, he declined. He was elected Coadjutor Bishop of Los Angeles in 1972 on the first ballot. He succeeded as diocesan bishop on January 1, 1974. During his time as bishop he supported the ordination of women to the priesthood. He also supported the establishment of missions to new immigrants in Los Angeles. He was also involved in a number of lawsuits aiming to retain church properties which were taken over by congregations who left the Episcopal Church. Rusack took the decision to demolish St Paul's Cathedral in Los Angeles, which suffered extensive damage in an earthquake. Rusack died on July 16, 1986, as a result of a heart attack in Pacific Palisades, Los Angeles.

== Personal life ==
Rusack married Janice Overfield of Salt Lake City on June 26, 1951. They had 2 children.
