= Church of the Good Shepherd (Rosemont, Pennsylvania) =

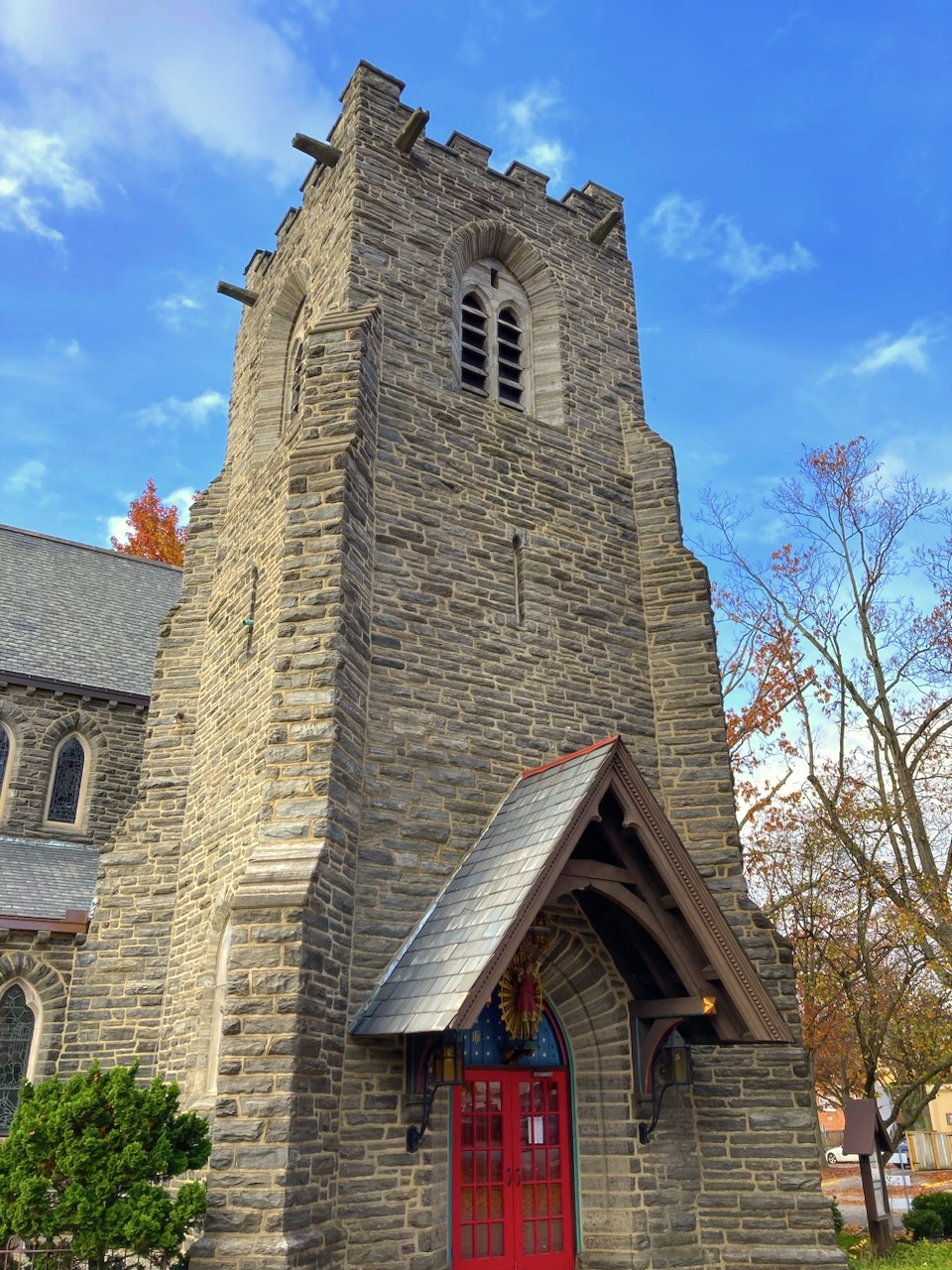
- The bell tower and north entrance
- Church of the Good Shepherd
- 40°1′28″N 75°19′29″W
- Location: 1116 W Lancaster Avenue, Rosemont, Pennsylvania
- Country: United States
- Denomination: Episcopal
- Tradition: Anglo-Catholic
- Churchmanship: High church
- Website: The Church of the Good Shepherd, Rosemont, Pennsylvania

History
- Status: active parish
- Founded: 1869
- Consecrated: 1910

Architecture
- Architect(s): Baily & Truscott (Philadelphia) (main church); Samuel Fowler and Samuel Mountford (Trenton, New Jersey) (Baptistry, Cloister, and Lady Chapel)
- Architectural type: Gothic Revival
- Style: English Gothic
- Groundbreaking: 1893
- Completed: 1894

Administration
- Diocese: Episcopal Diocese of Pennsylvania
- Parish: Church of the Good Shepherd

Clergy
- Rector: parochus vacans

The Church of the Good Shepherd in Rosemont, Pennsylvania, is an Episcopal parish church in the progressive Anglo-Catholic tradition. It is part of the Episcopal Diocese of Pennsylvania and is located in the Philadelphia Main Line.

Good Shepherd offers a robust program of high church Anglican worship, using the Book of Common Prayer (1979). The church welcomes all people, regardless of race, ethnicity, sexual orientation, gender identity, or socioeconomic status.

The 19th-century church building has been called "a gorgeous, absolutely stunning neo-gothic space, [whose] acoustics are fantastic".

In 2017, the church reported 72 members; in 2023, it reported 50 members. No membership statistics were reported in 2024 national parochial reports. Plate and pledge financial support reported by the church in 2024 was $204,789. Average Sunday Attendance (ASA) reported in 2024 was 63 persons. This was a relative increase on ASA of 26 reported in 2020.

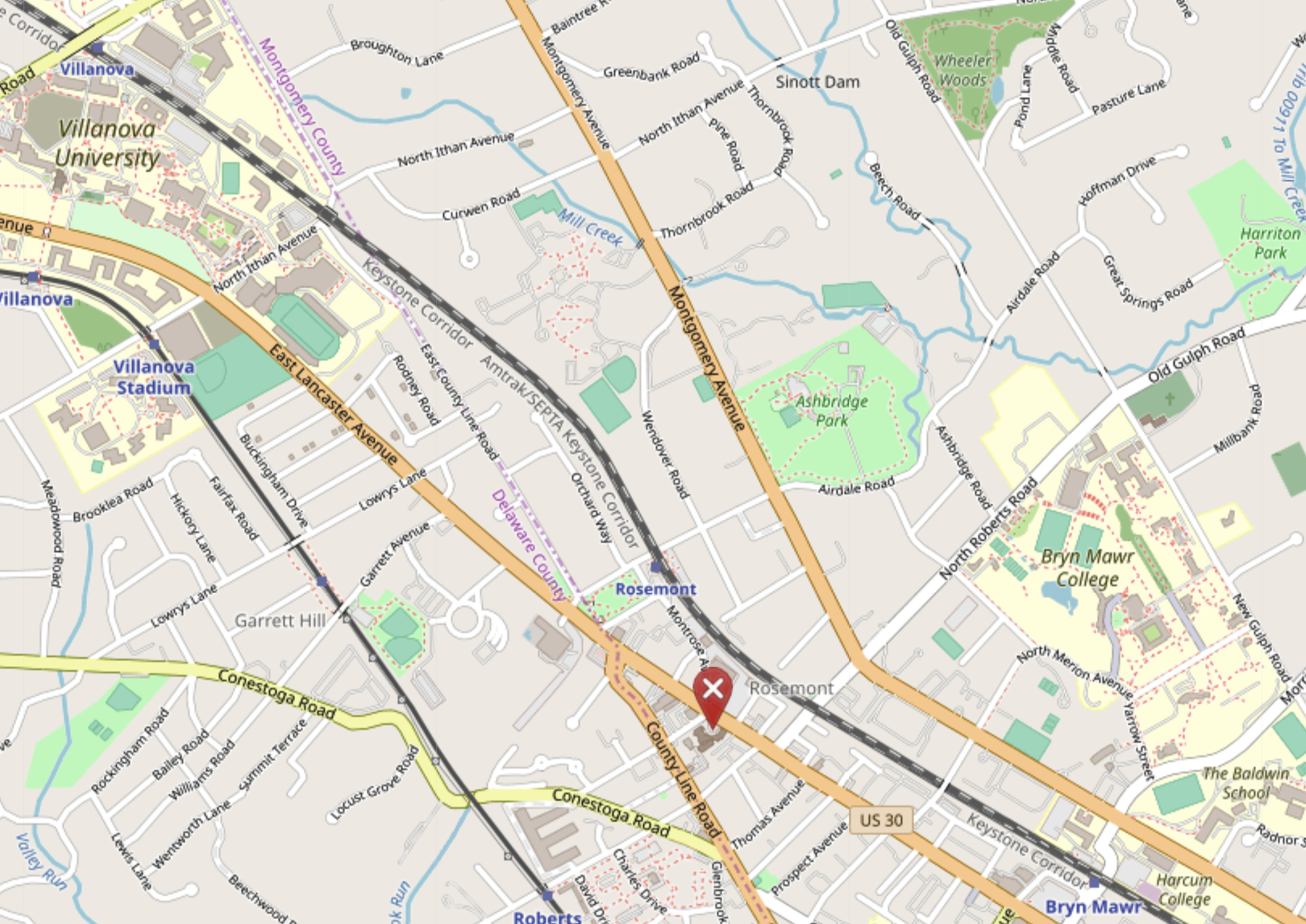
Location of the church

== History ==
The parish was founded in 1869 as part of the post-Oxford Movement Anglo-Catholic revival in the Anglican Church, and was admitted to the Diocese of Pennsylvania in 1871. Its original church building, demolished in 1901, was on the north side of Lancaster Avenue, just east of the present football stadium of Villanova University.

The church building was designed by the Philadelphia architectural firm of Baily & Truscott. Constructed in 1893 and 1894, the architecture is in the Gothic Revival style of a 14th-Century English country church. The first services were held in 1894, and the building was consecrated in 1910.

=== Rectors ===
Name	Years
Henry Palethorp Hay	1869 - 1883
Arthur B. Conger	1883 - 1912
Charles Townsend Jr.	1912 - 1930
Thomas A. Sparks	1930 - 1932
William P.S. Lander	1933 - 1962
James H. Cupit, Jr.	1963 - 1971
George William Rutler	1971 - 1978
Andrew Craig Mead (Note: Fr. Mead went on to serve as Rector of St. Thomas Episcopal Church on Fifth Avenue in Manhattan, New York City, from 1996 to 2014.)	1978 - 1985
Jeffrey N. Steenson	1986 - 1989
David Moyer	1989 - 2002
parochus vacans (Note: In 2002 the Rev. David Moyer was deposed from the priesthood by the bishop of Pennsylvania, Charles E. Bennison. Fr. Moyer remained de facto rector of Good Shepherd until 2011 when the parish was returned to control of the Diocese of Pennsylvania by court order, and he vacated the premises.)	2002 - 2012
Richard C. Alton	2012 - 2014
parochus vacans	2014 - 2020
Kyle Babin	2020 – 2026

=== Priest in charge ===
Name	Years
Madeleine Hill	2026 -

== Art and architecture ==
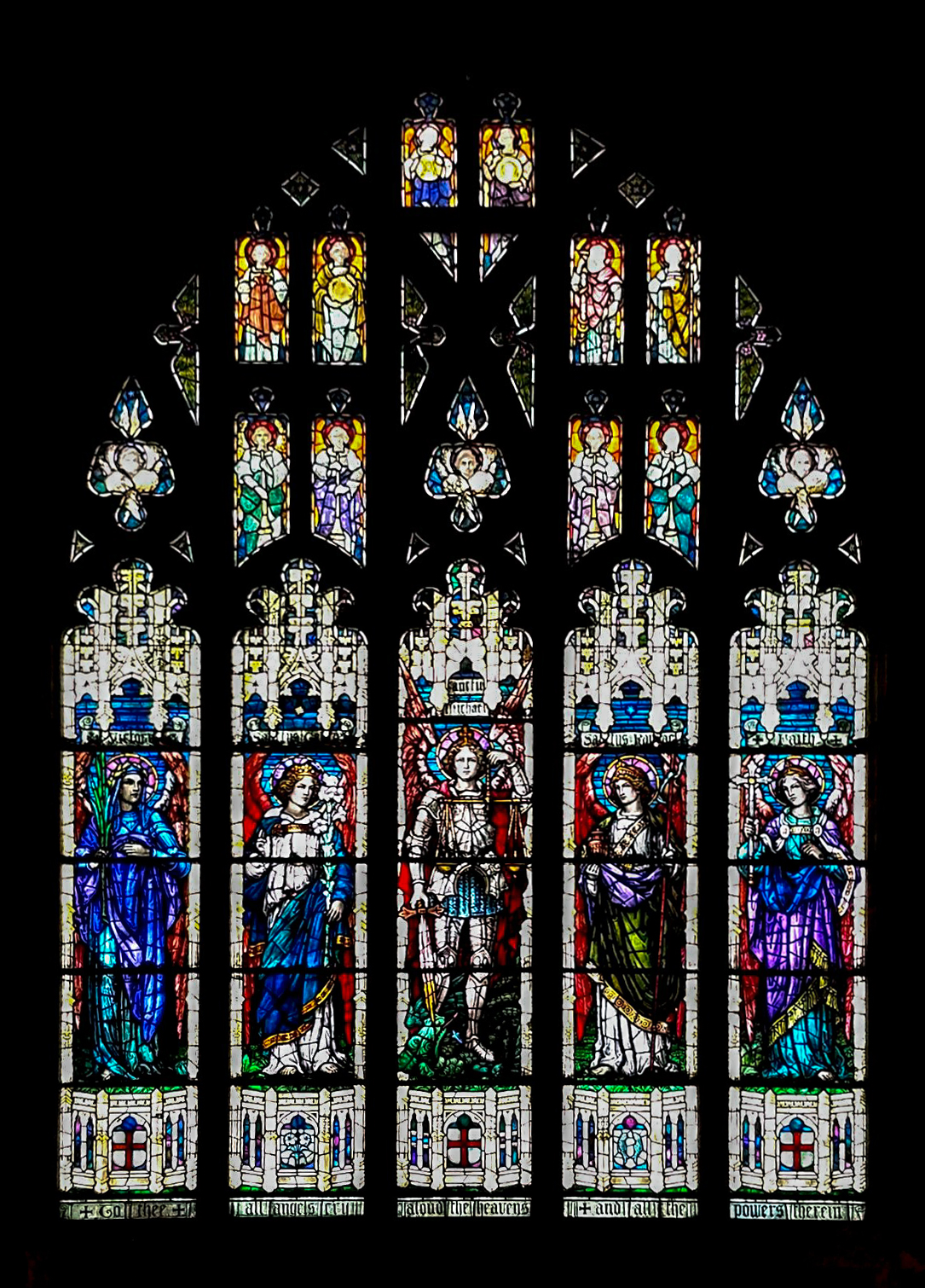
West Window, with St. Michael the Archangel (center), a memorial to the dead of the First World War

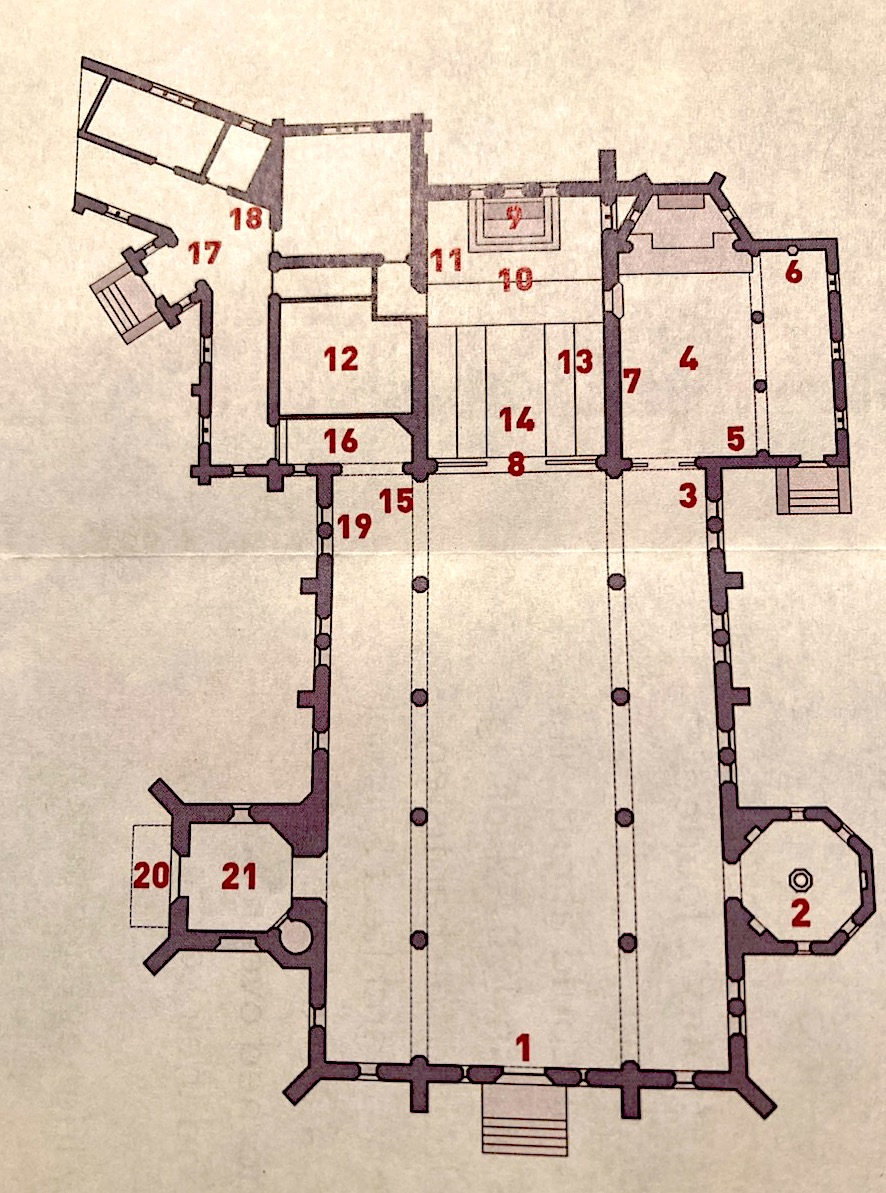
Floor plan of the church: (1) west door; (2) baptistry; (3) Good Shepherd votive shrine; (4) Lady Chapel; (5) tower bells console; (6) Marian votive shrine; (7) icons; (8) Rood Screen; (9) High altar; (10) altar rail; (11) bishop's chair; (12) organ pipes chamber; (13) organ console; (14) chancel; (15) Our Lady of Walsingham votive shrine; (16) war memorial; (17) bishop's door; (18) sacristy entrance; (19) nativity window; (20) Good Shepherd statue above the north door; (21) bell tower

=== Entrance and bell tower ===
Above the main (north) entrance to the church is a polychrome statue depicting the boy Jesus as the Good Shepherd. The crenellated bell tower contains bells playing the Cambridge Quarters, as well as ringing the Angelus and ringing before Mass; a bell elsewhere sounds during the eucharistic consecration. The chime of bells, donated in 1913, are playable from a console in the Lady Chapel. Ten of the bells are stationary; the largest (the 11th bell) can be swung.

=== Nave and stained glass ===
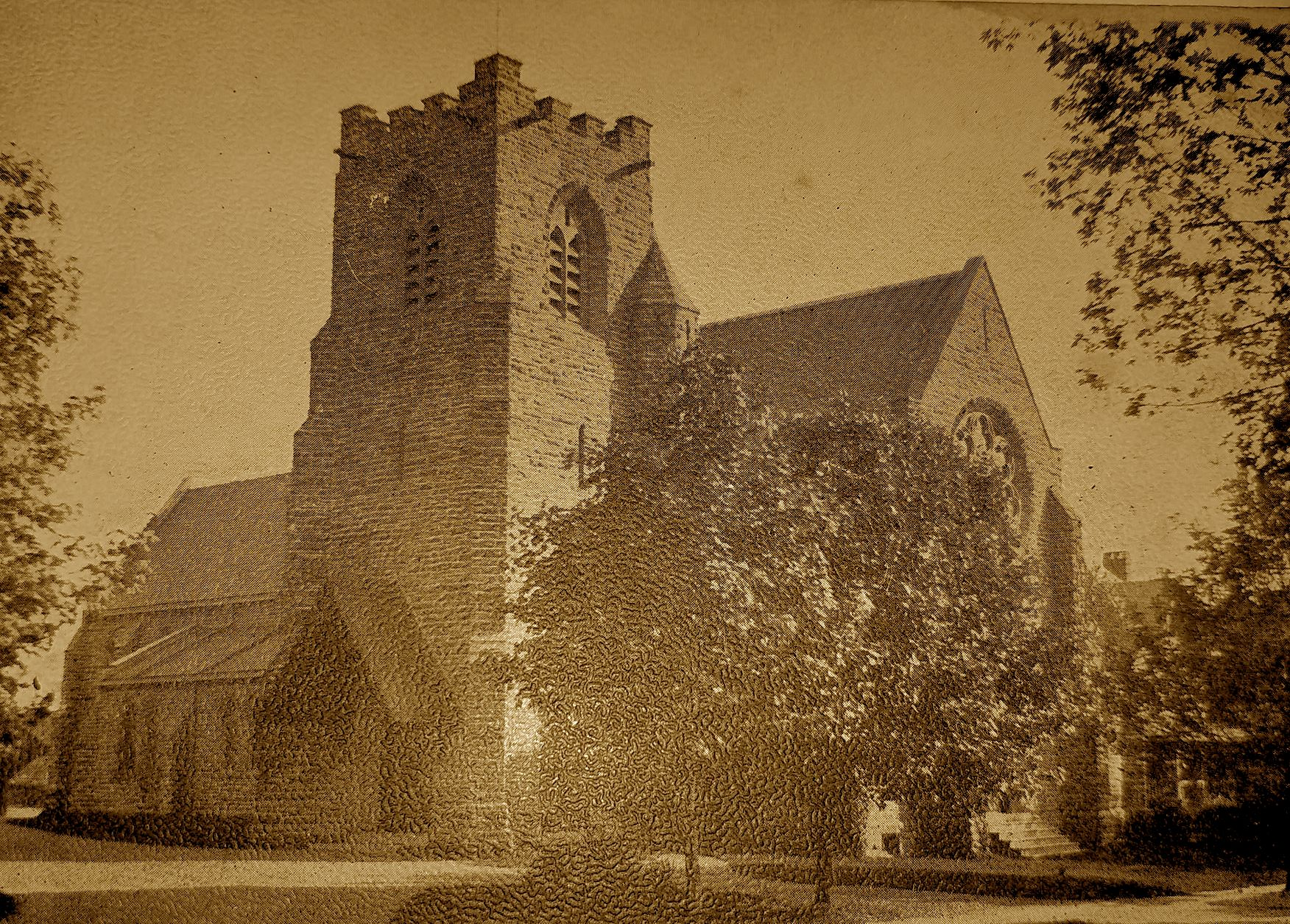
Church building c. 1910.

There is a hammerbeam roof. The nave comprises five bays and a clerestory, all with stained glass. In all, the building's stained glass includes 50 figurative windows and six ornamental windows.

=== Rood screen ===
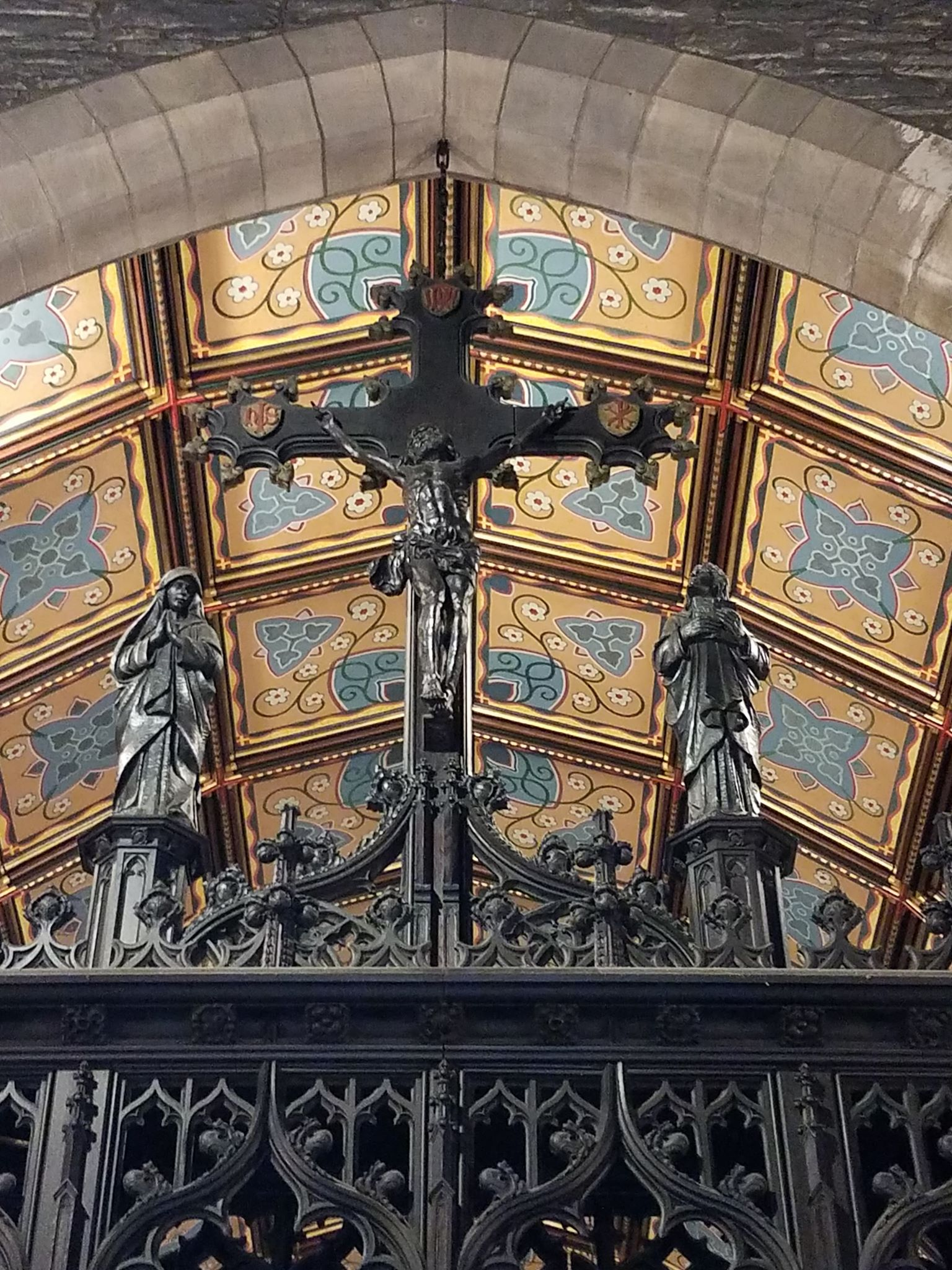
Rood screen and chancel ceiling

A large carved wooden rood screen surmounted with a crucifixion separates the chancel from the nave. The screen, designed by Percy M. Fowler of Trenton, New Jersey, was added to the building in 1912. Its cast iron gates are by blacksmith Samuel Yellin (1884–1940).

=== Chancel ===
The chancel contains a decorated coffered ceiling.

=== High altar and reredos ===
The high altar is made of Caen stone and was installed in 1905. In 1929 the artist and parishioner George Fort Gibbs created seven paintings for the high altar's reredos as a memorial to his parents. The center panel is a Virgin and Child flanked by panels depicting other figures from the Christian era and Old Testament: Saint Francis of Assisi, Saint Peter, King Saint Edward the Confessor (last king of the English House of Wessex), Moses, Aaron, and King David.

=== Lady chapel ===
There is a separate Lady chapel, dedicated in 1918, at the top of the south aisle. The space was originally a sacristy and choir room. The current limestone altar was installed in 1954. The tabernacle and triptych, as well as the carved double-desk, are by parishioner Davis d'Ambly and date from the 1980s. There is a carved Marian votive shrine in the chapel.

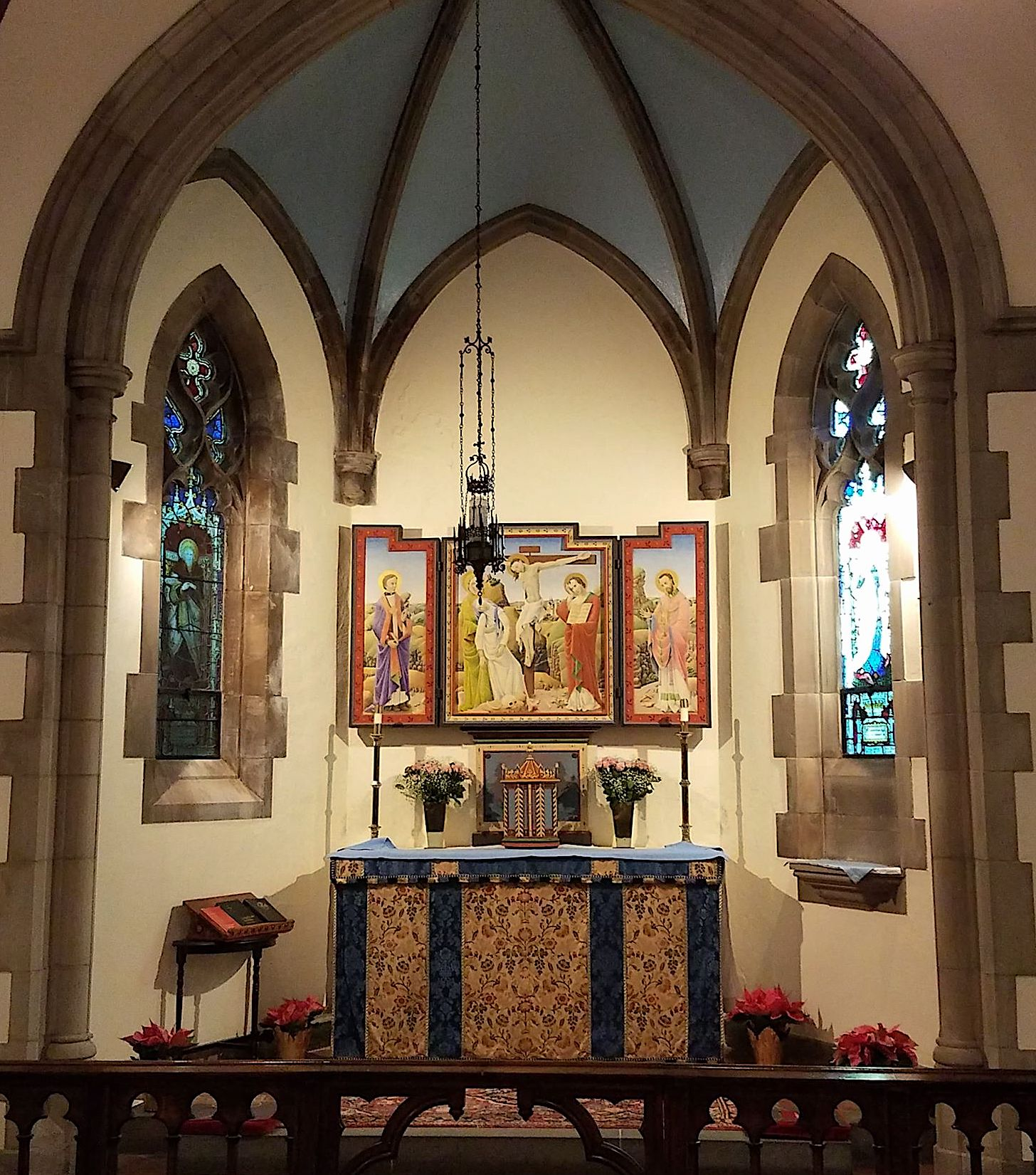
Lady Chapel

=== Baptistry ===
An octagonal baptistry with carved font and stained glass was added off the south side of the nave in 1932. The chandelier is by Samuel Yellin and the glazing and polychrome are by Valentine d'Ogries (1889–1959).

=== Stations of the Cross ===
The fourteen Stations of the Cross were painted between 1956 and 1962 by parishioner and local artist Constance LaBoiteaux Drake. Models for the male images ranged from the artist's sons, to lifeguards on Nantucket Island, students at Haverford College, and (for the Roman soldiers) Italian sailors aboard the SS Leonardo da Vinci. The stations are painted in tempera, on wood. The frames were made by Philip Jenney.

=== War memorial ===
The war memorial, created in 1942, honors parishioners who have served in the armed forces in and since World War II. It was installed at the urging of a parishioner, Lt. Gen. Milton Baker, who also established the nearby Valley Forge Military Academy and College.

=== Crypt ===
There is a columbarium and funerary chapel in the crypt of the church, along with a burial vault containing the remains of benefactor Harry Banks French and members of his family.

=== Memorial Garden ===
Adjacent to the church outside, there is a memorial garden for the interment of cremated remains.

== Music ==
=== Choirs ===
The Church of the Good Shepherd maintains two choirs in the Anglican choral tradition: a semi-professional choir of adults, and the Good Shepherd Choristers for children ages 7 and above. From 2024 to 2026, the Director of Music was Robert McCormick.

=== Organ ===
The organ at Good Shepherd is an Austin, Op. 2613 (1977), with three manuals and 56 ranks of pipes along with 9 digital voices installed by Walker Technical Company. Revisions, nudging the organ in a more Romantic direction, were undertaken in 1988 after water damage to the organ chambers.

== Galleries ==
=== Art and architecture ===
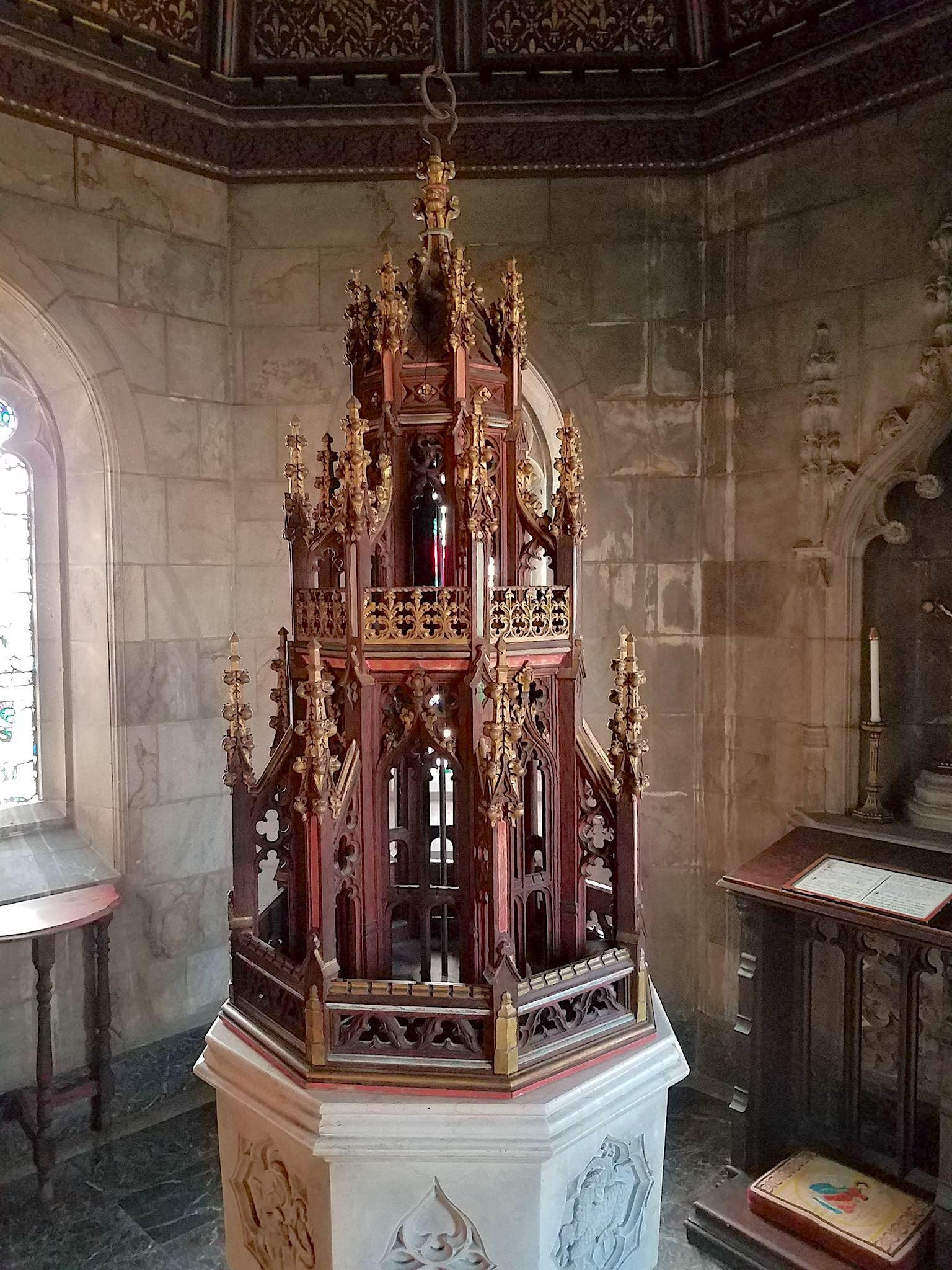
Detail of carved baptismal font cover

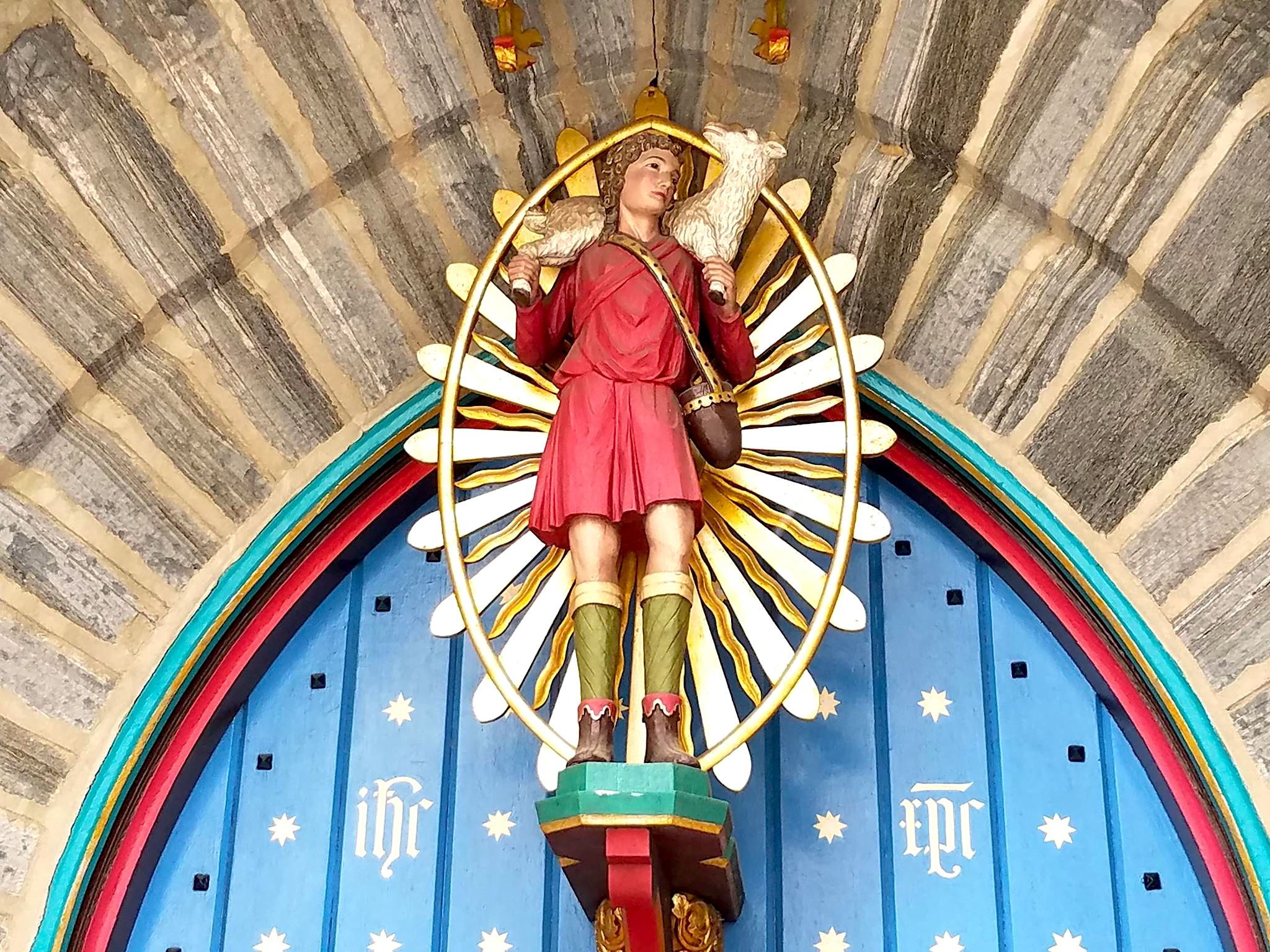
The boy Jesus as the Good Shepherd; image above the north door of the church

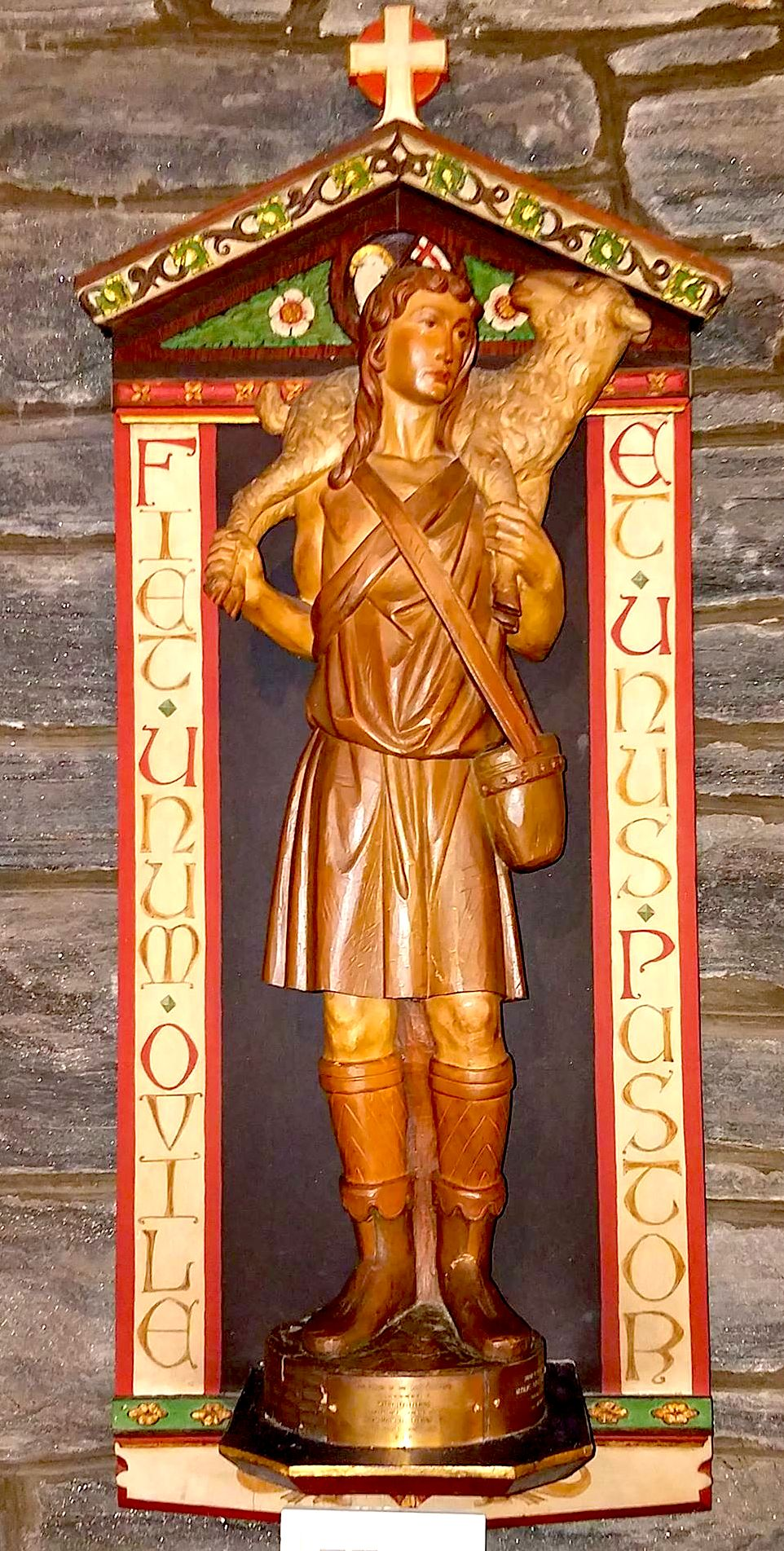
Good Shepherd Votive Shrine is based on a marble statuette in the Lateran Museum and honors three children from the same family who all died in infancy.

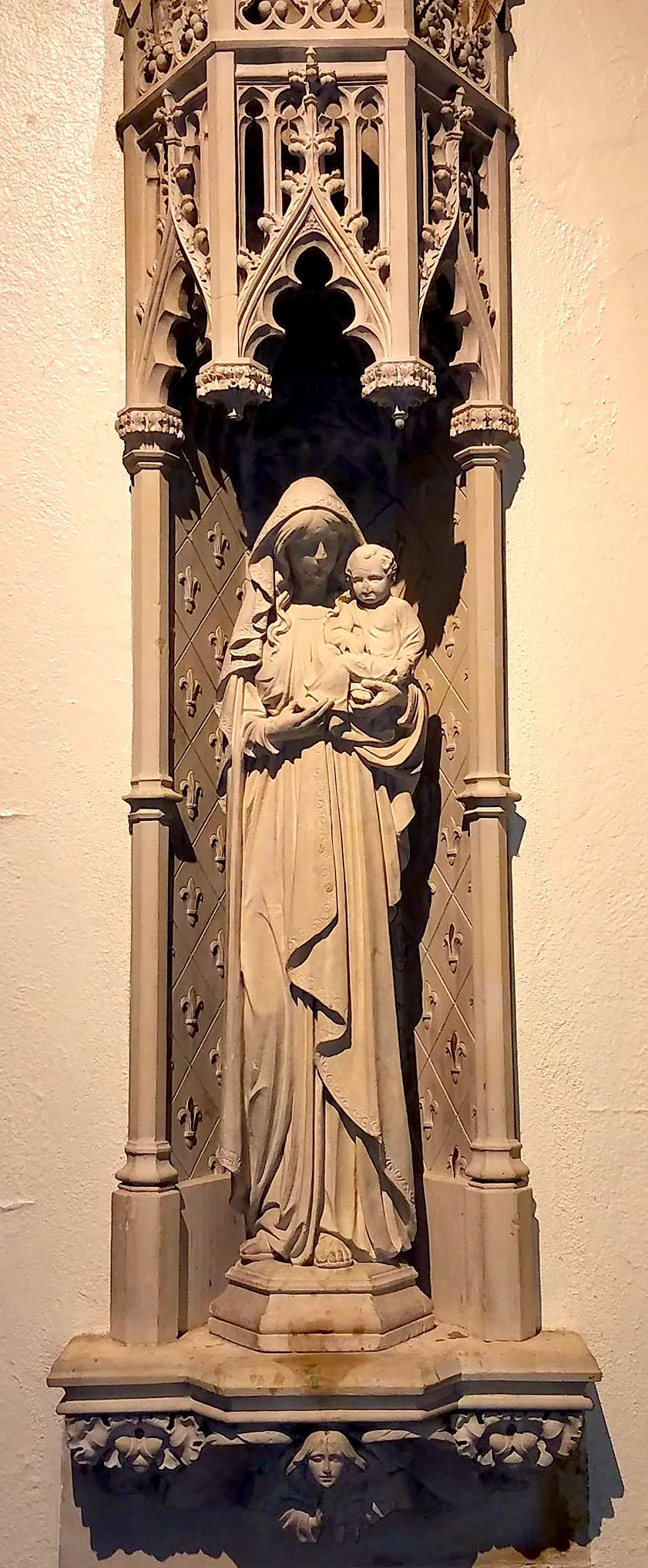
Marian Votive Shrine, Mother of the Good Shepherd. Carved in Caen stone, it was installed in the Lady Chapel in 1923 in honor of a parishioner's child who died in infancy.

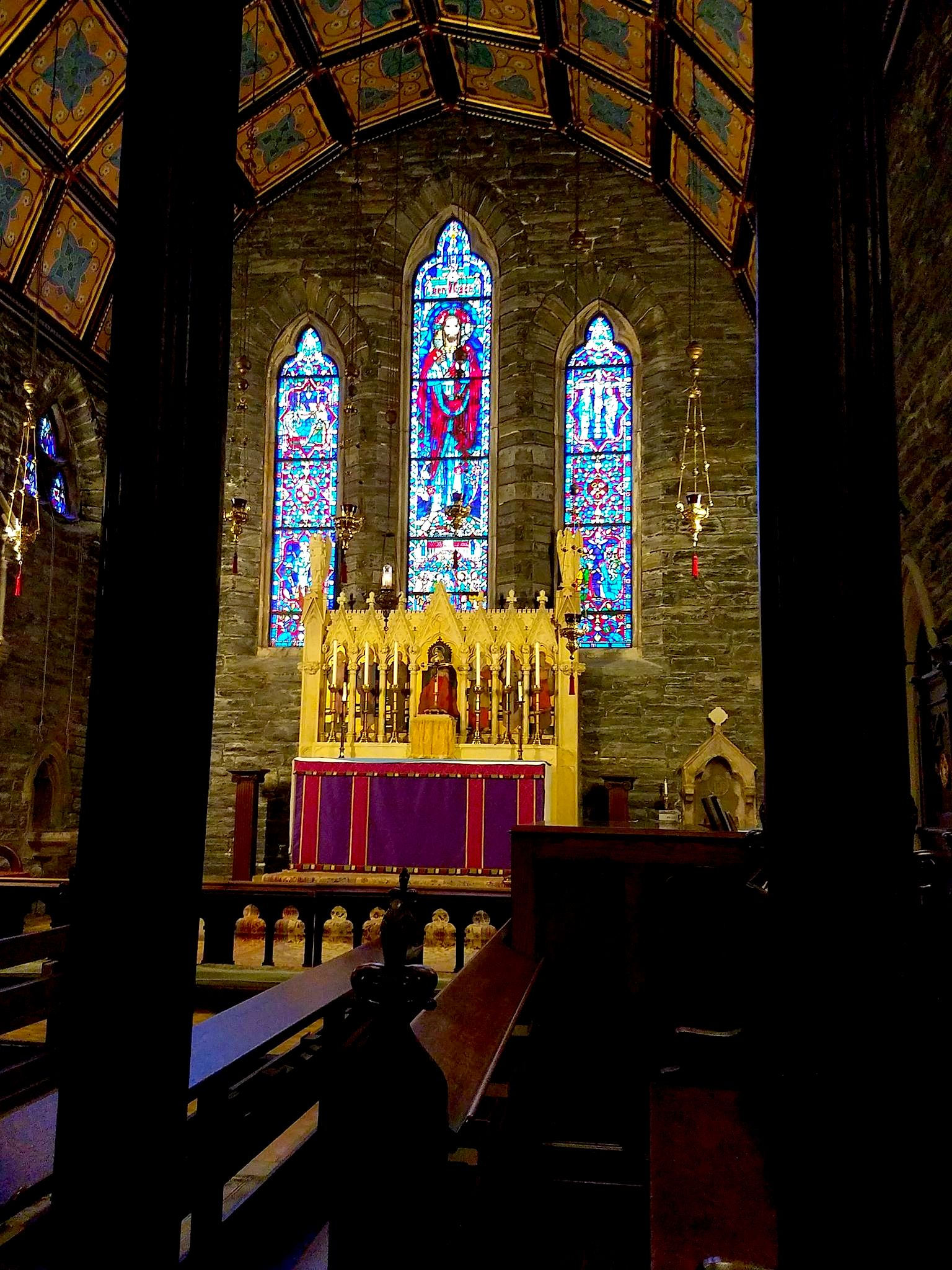
High altar with purple altar frontal marking the ecclesial season of Advent

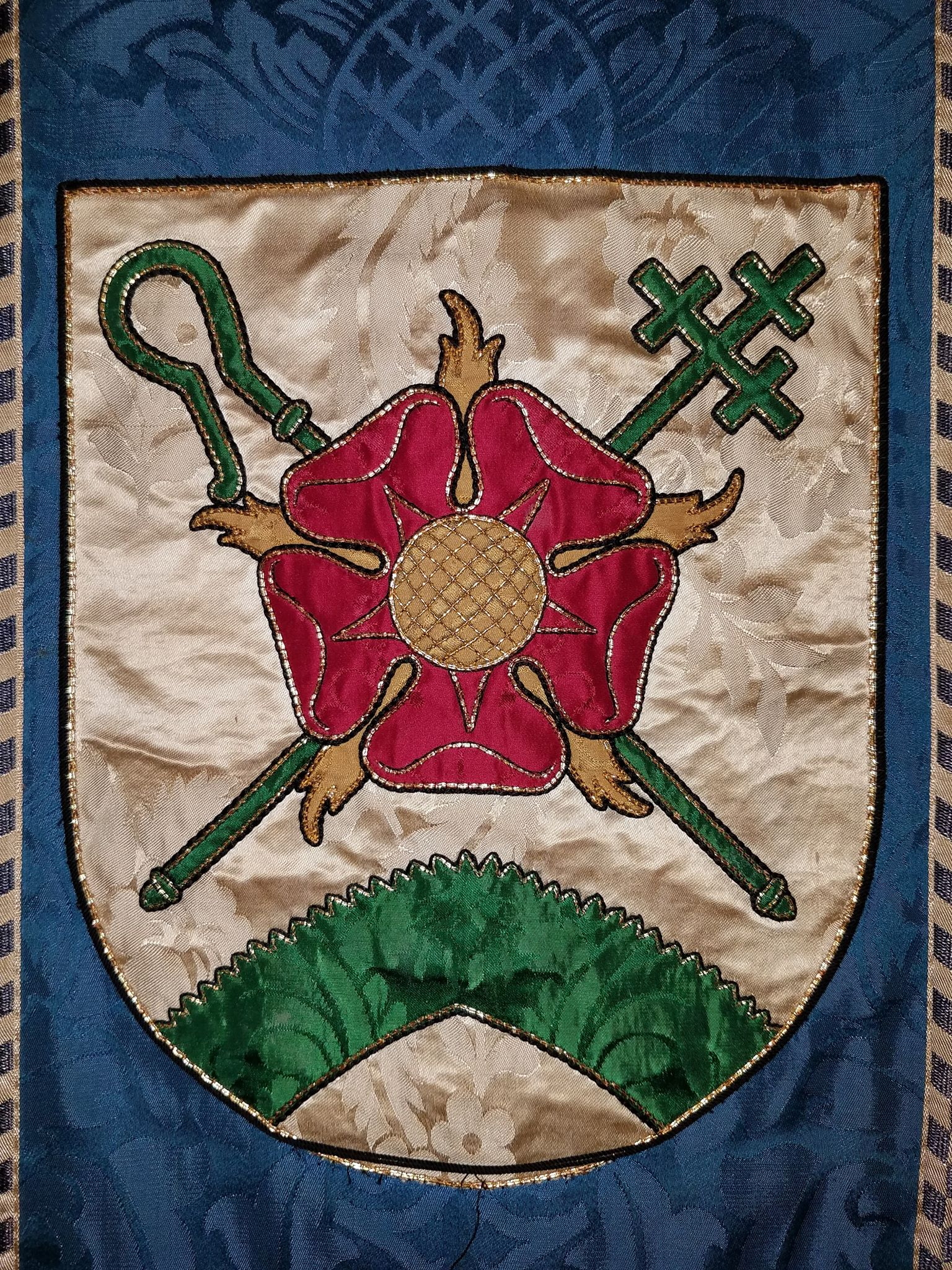
Arms of the parish, including the Red Rose of Lancaster

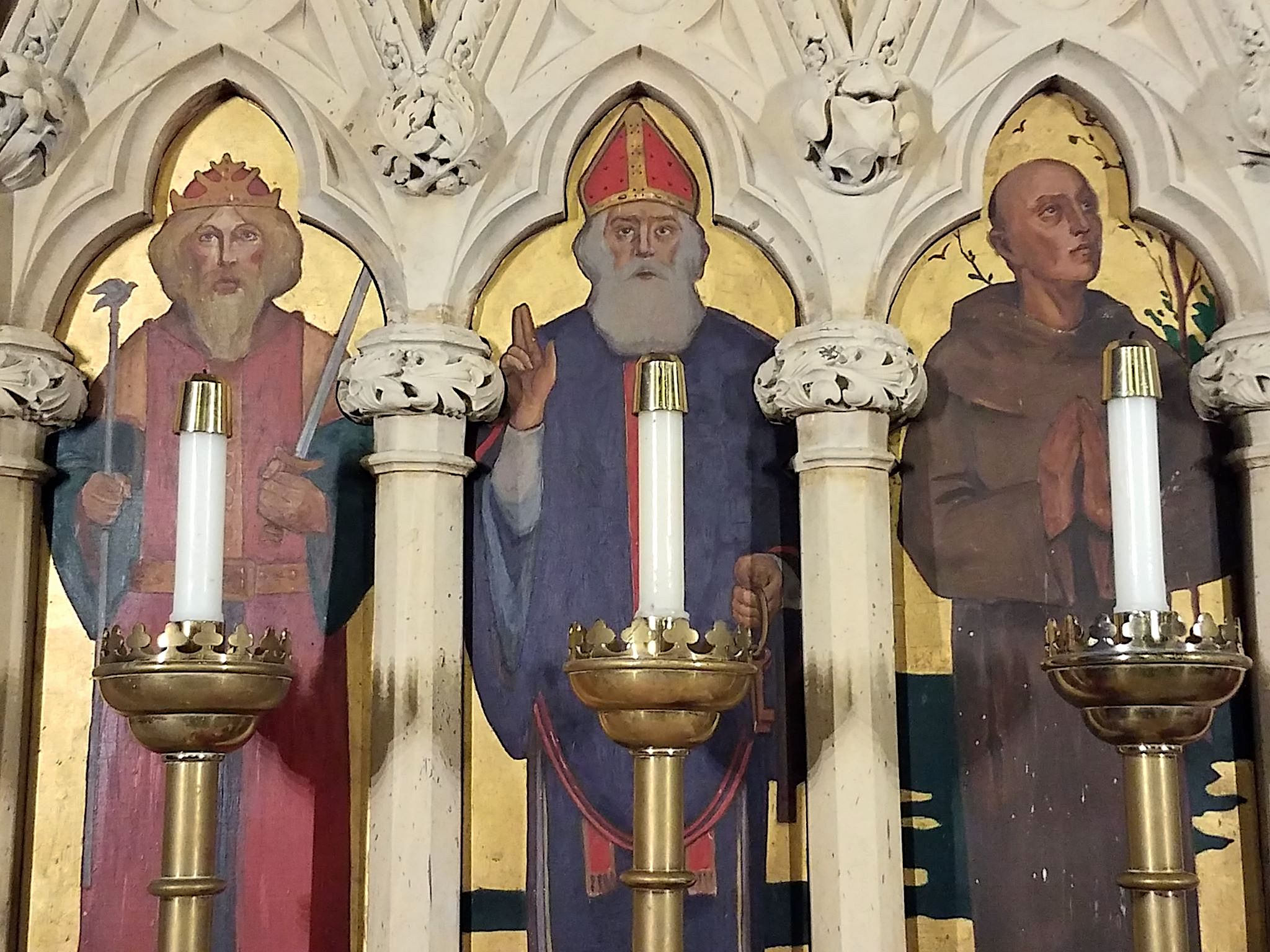
Detail of reredos, L to R, King Saint Edward the Confessor (last king of the English House of Wessex), Saint Peter the Apostle, Saint Francis of Assisi

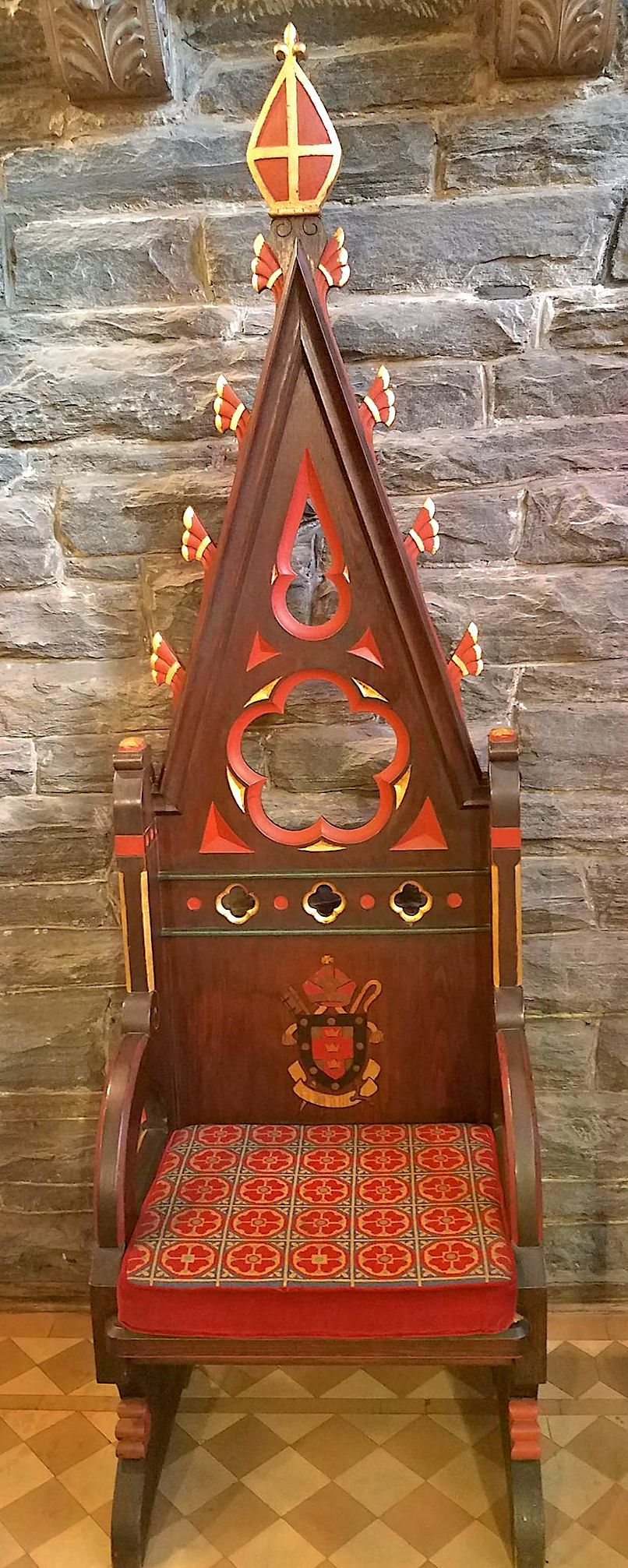
19th century cathedra (bishop's chair) in sanctuary showing arms of the Diocese of Pennsylvania

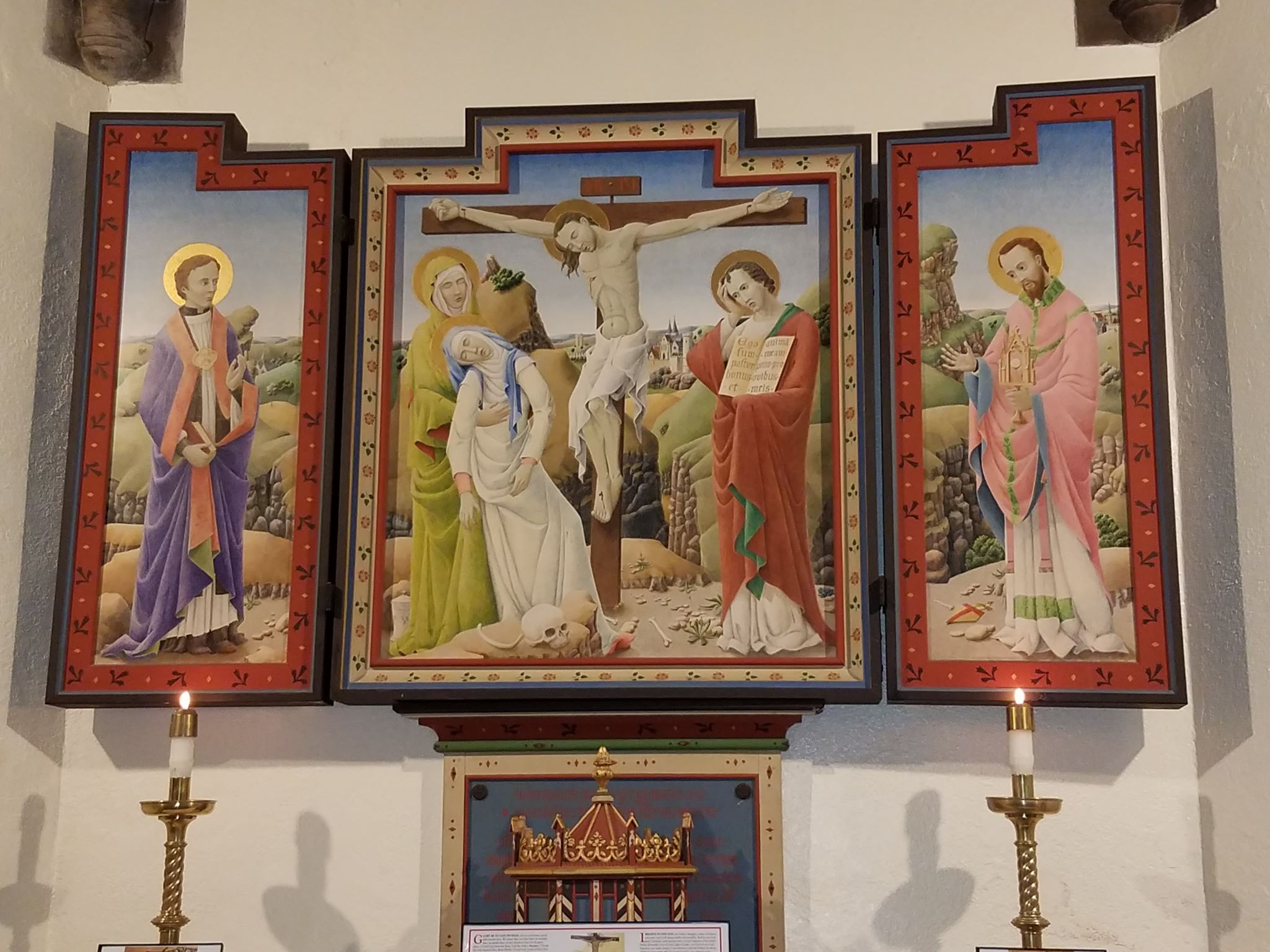
Triptych in the Lady chapel

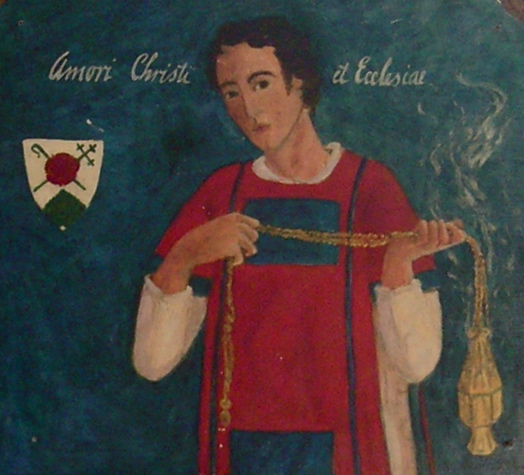
Sacristy painting

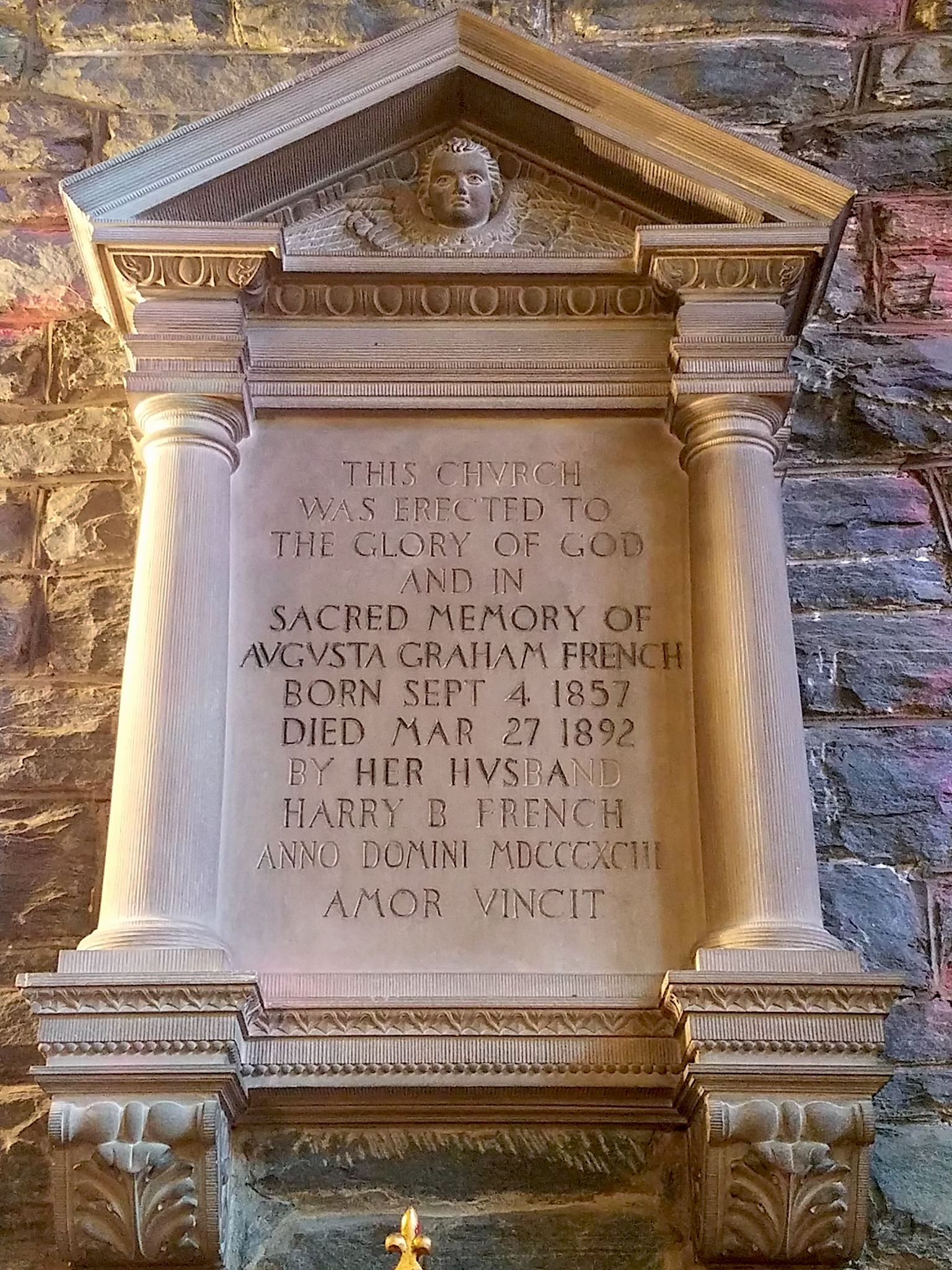
Augusta French Memorial, in whose memory the church was built

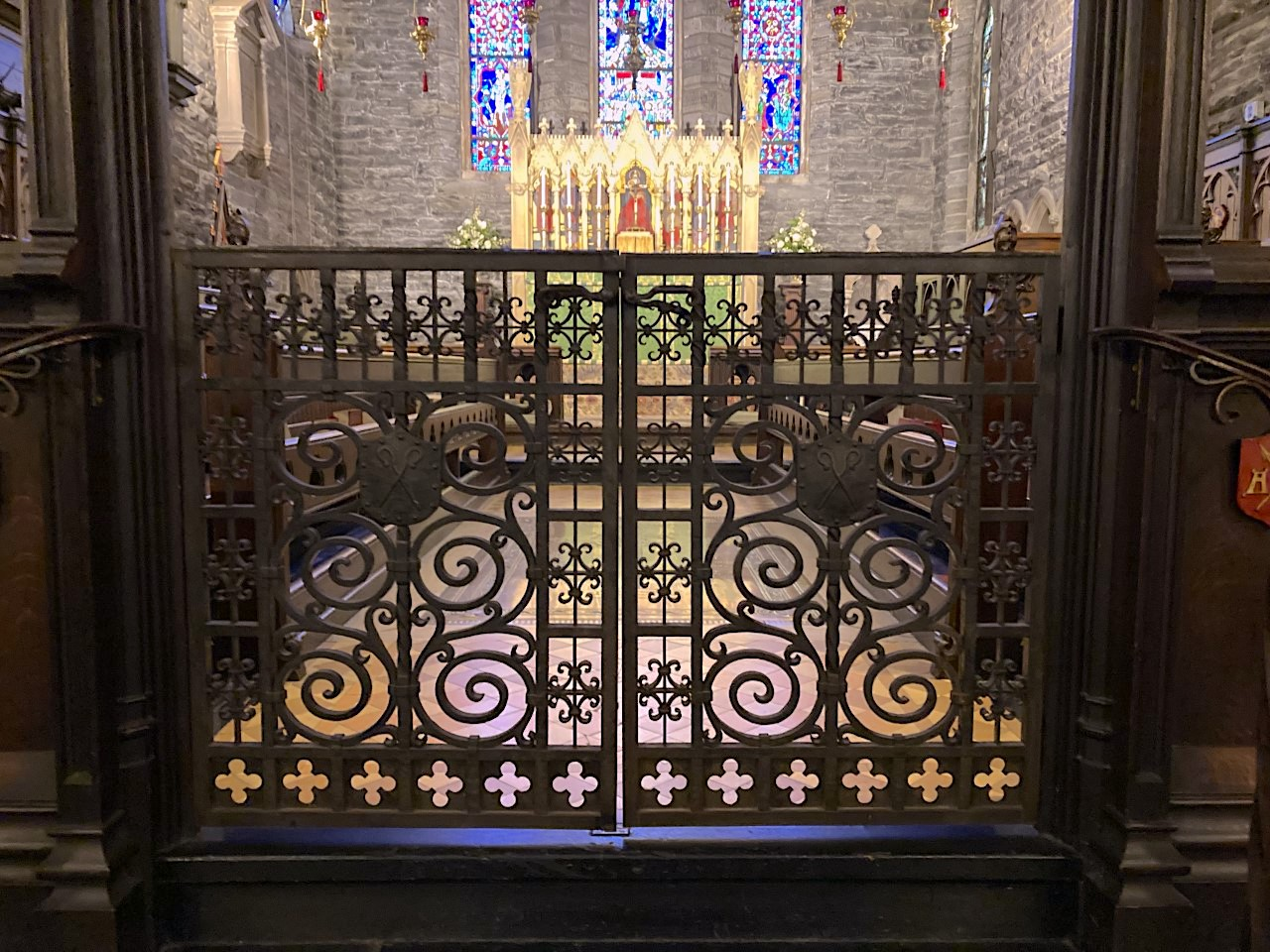
Chancel iron gates designed by Samuel Yellin (c. 1912)

=== Stained Glass (examples) ===
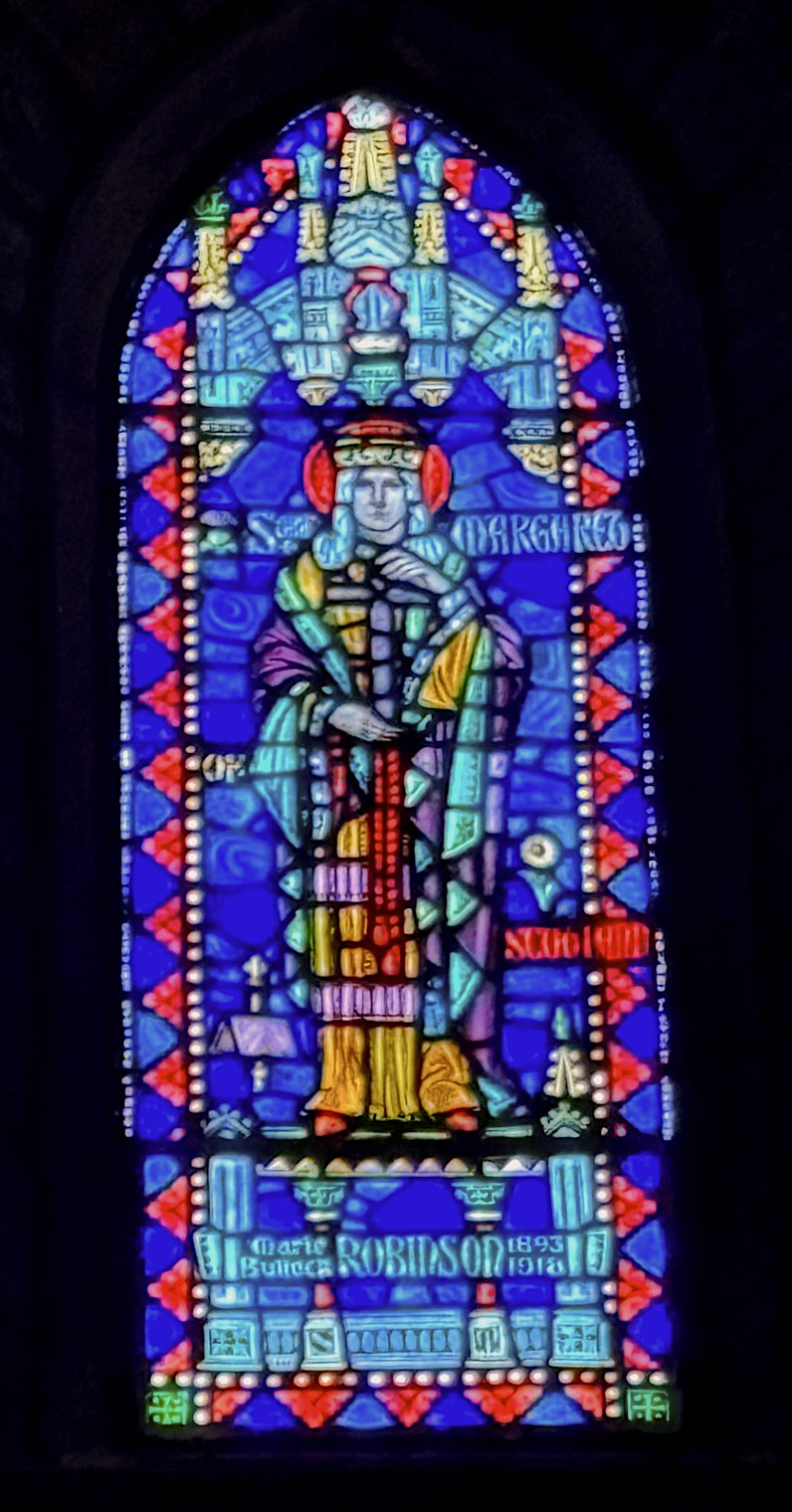
St. Margaret of Scotland in clerestory

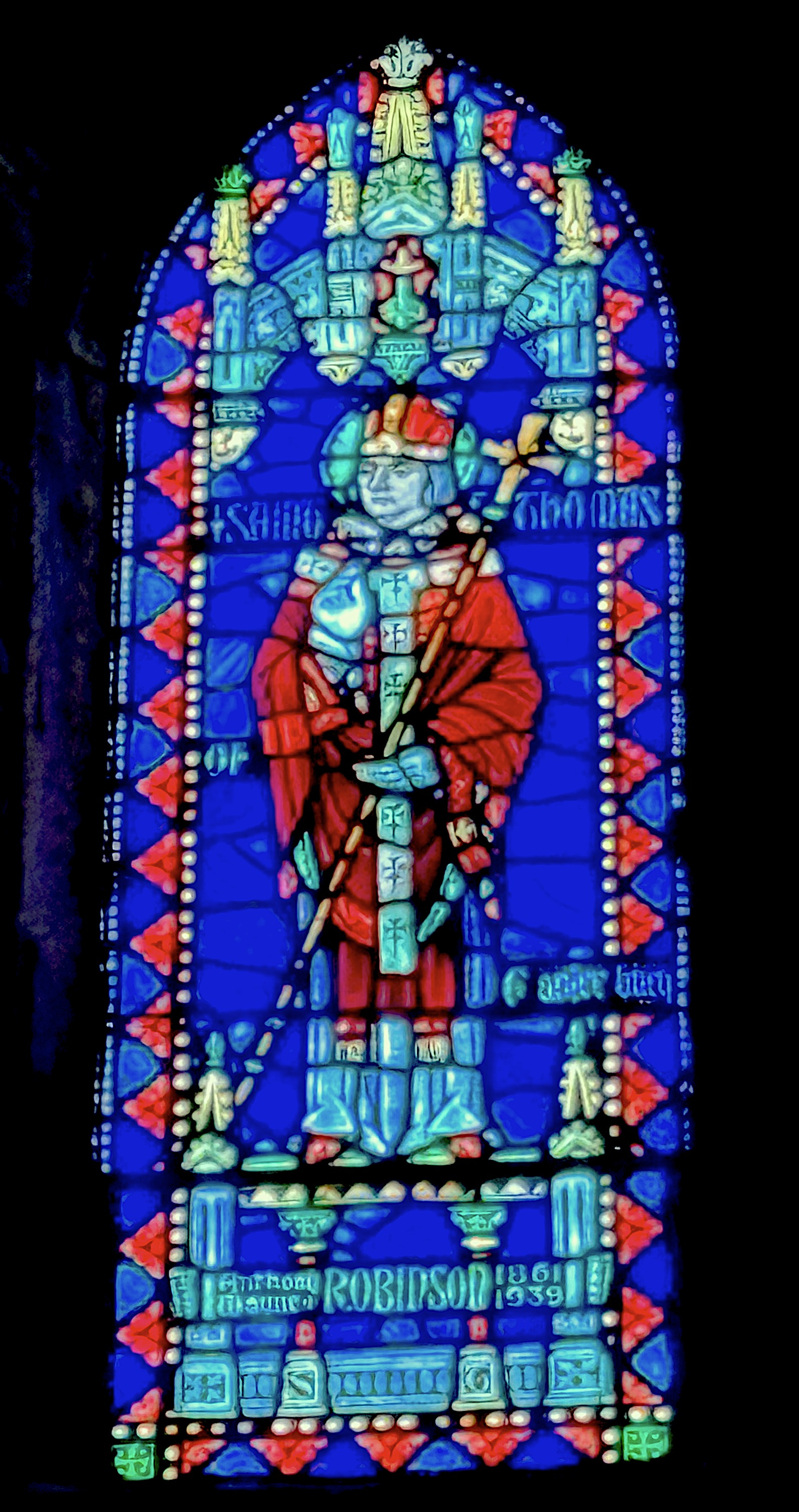
Thomas Becket in clerestory

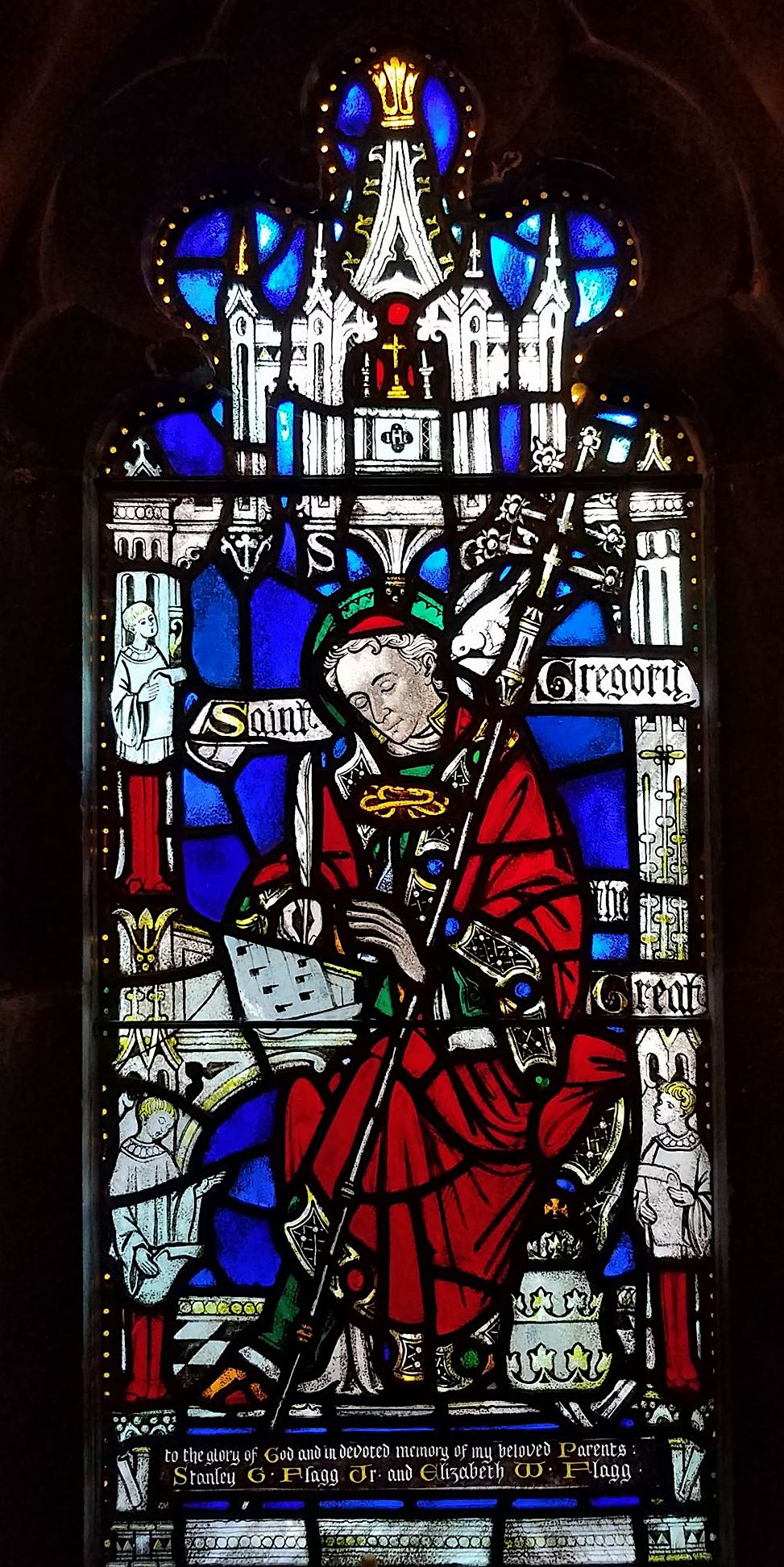
St. Gregory the Great

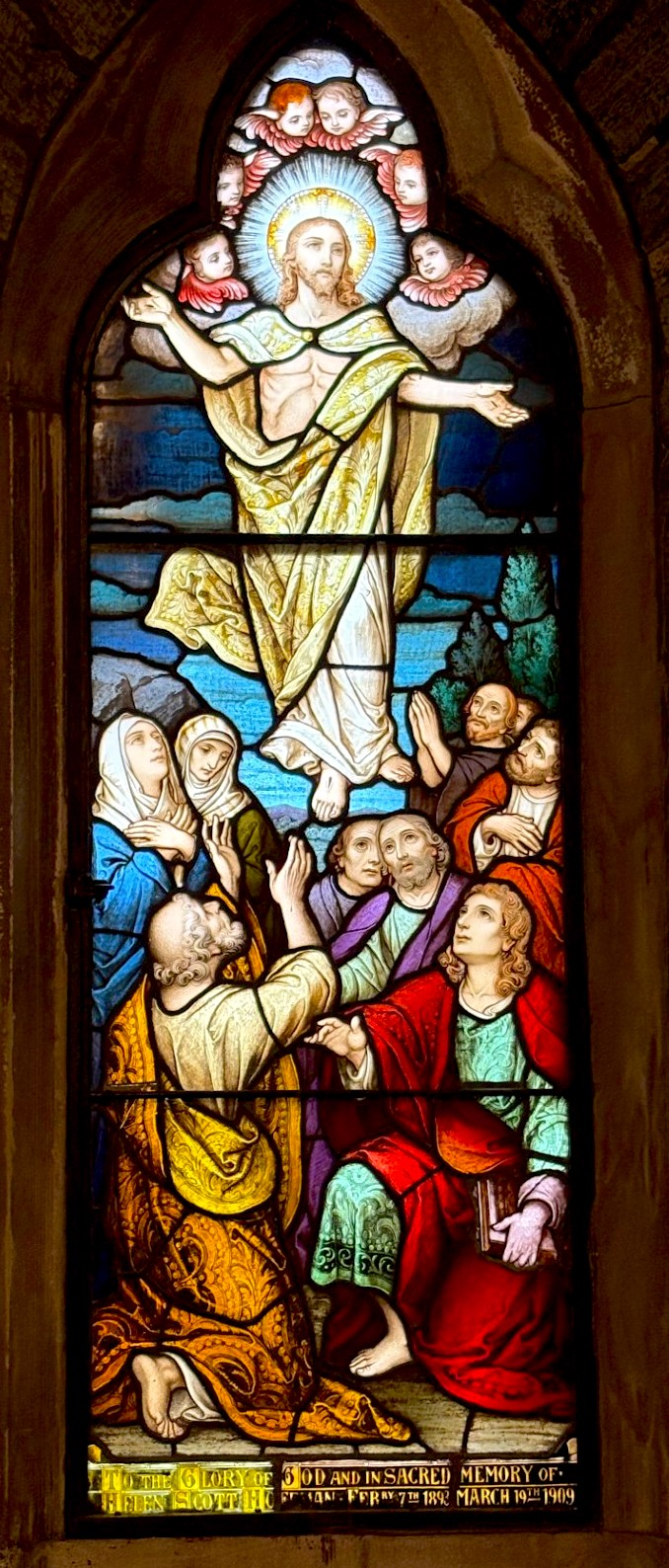
Ascension of Jesus

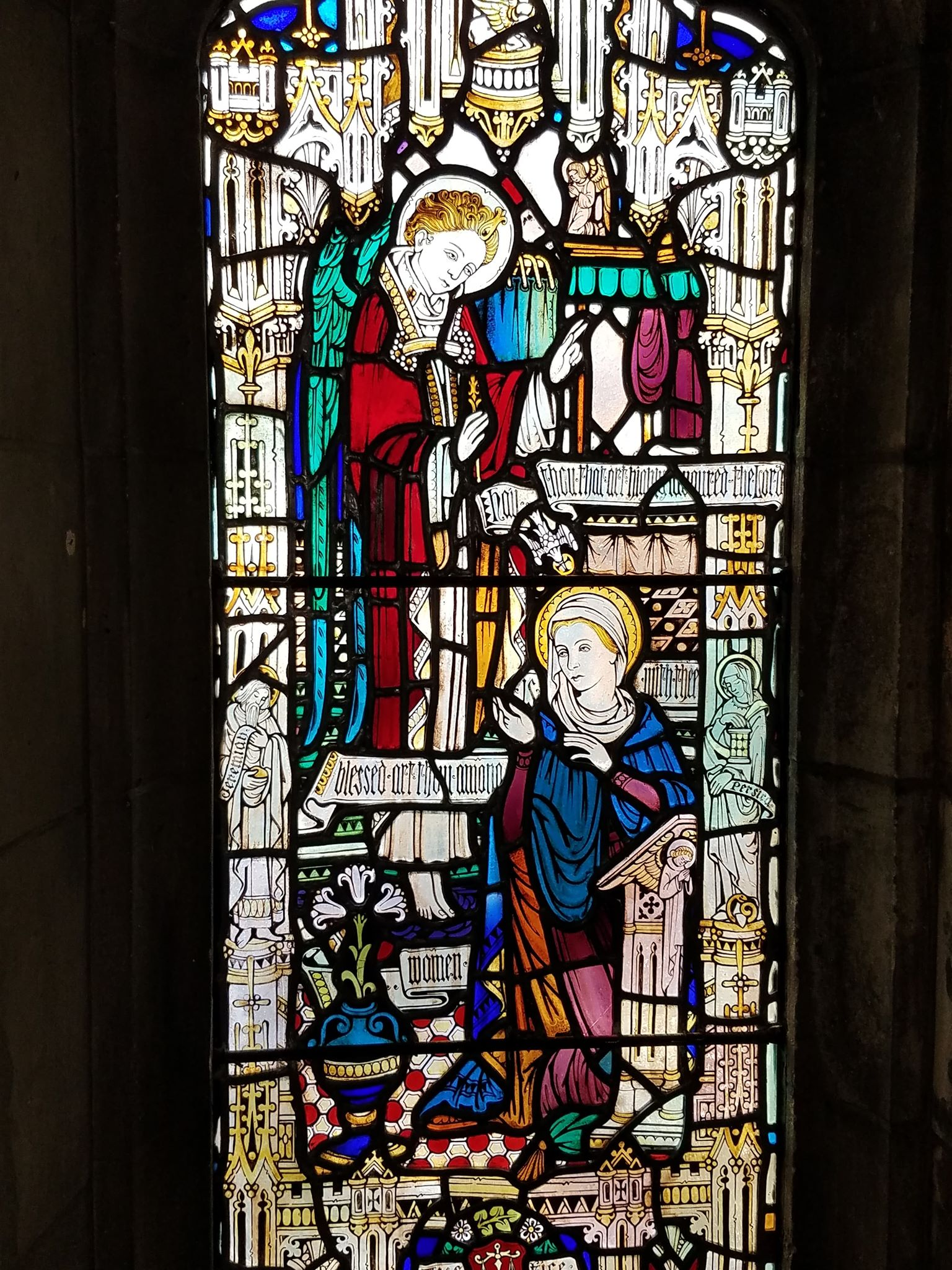
Annunciation

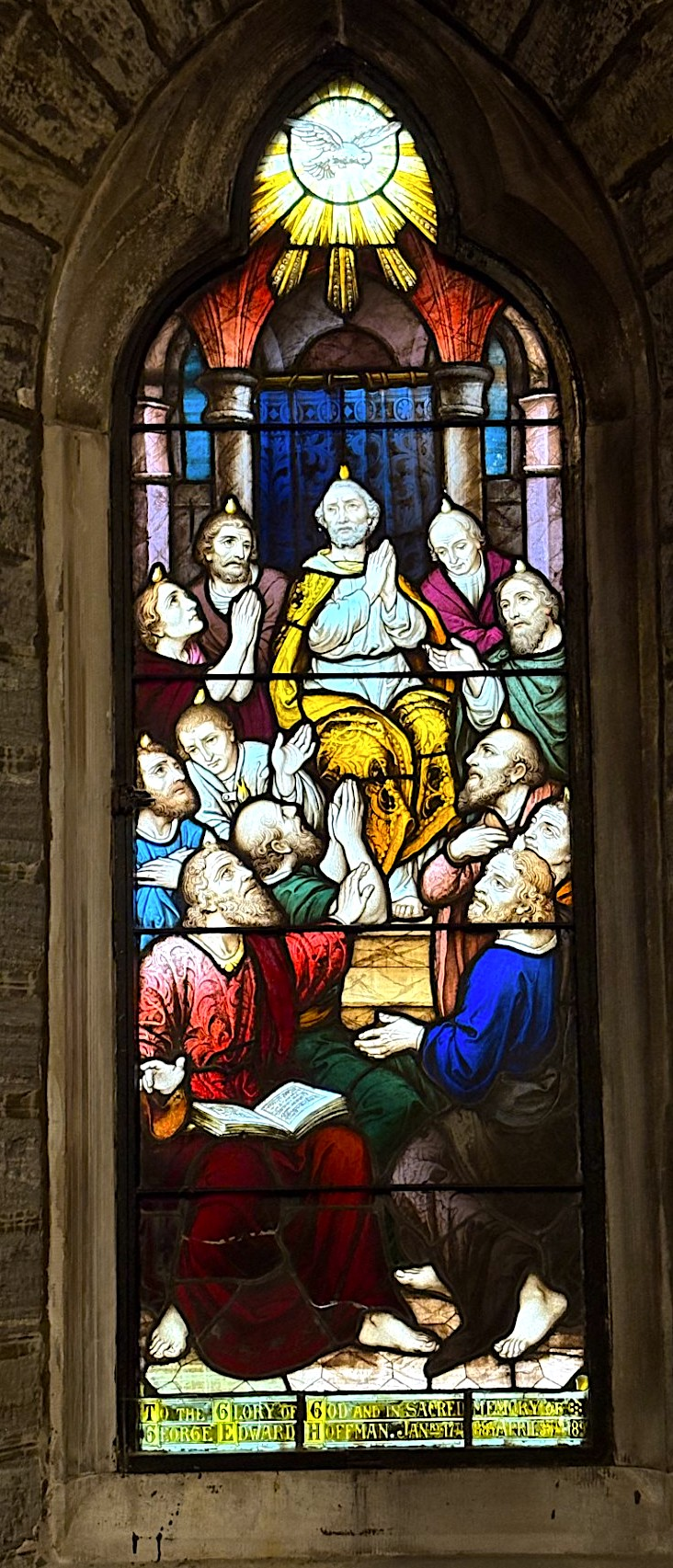
Pentecost

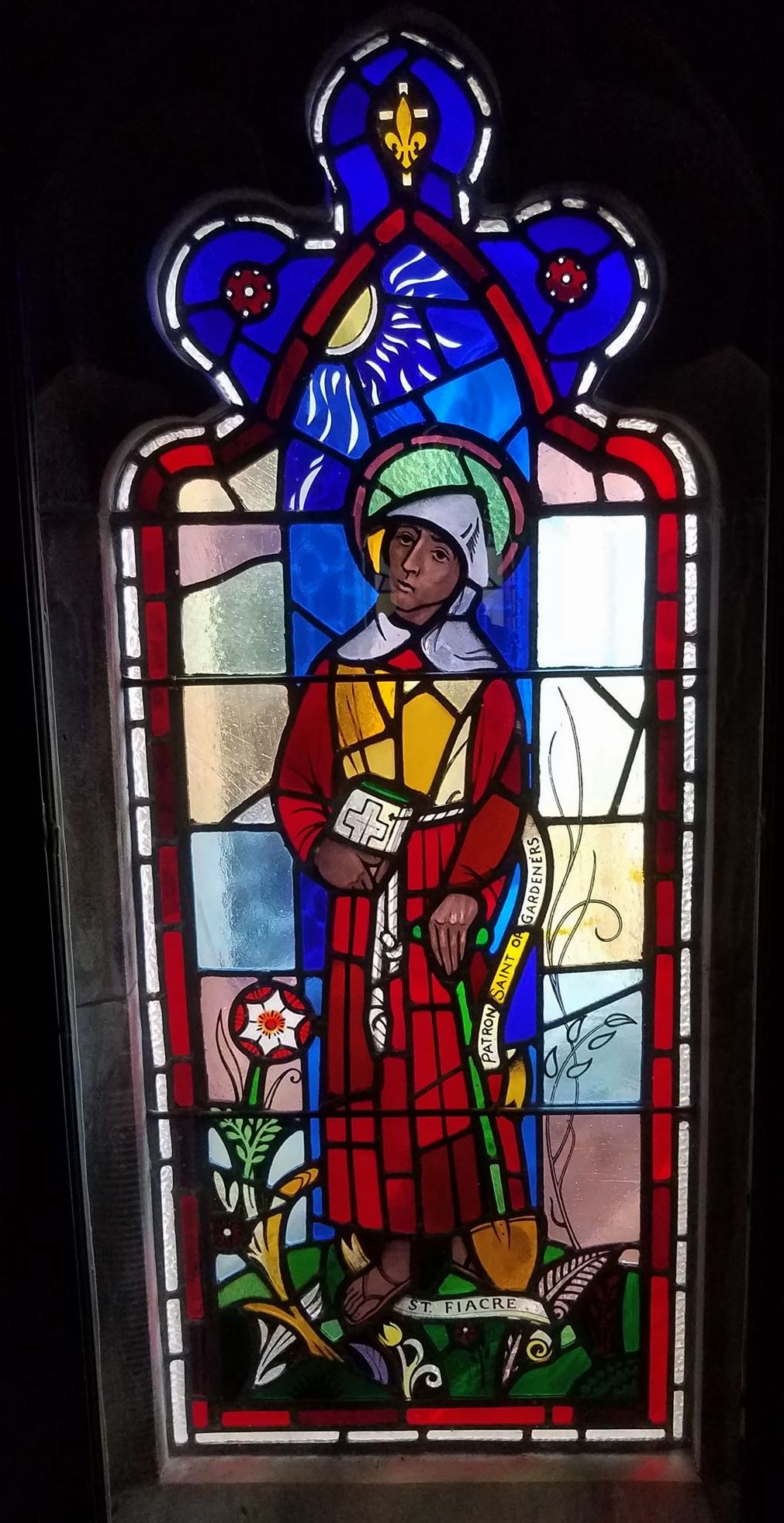
St. Fiacre

=== Stations of the Cross ===
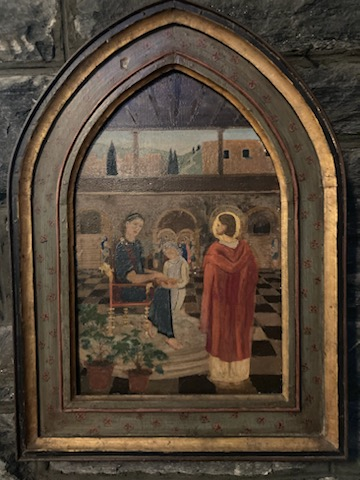
Jesus is condemned to death (Station I)

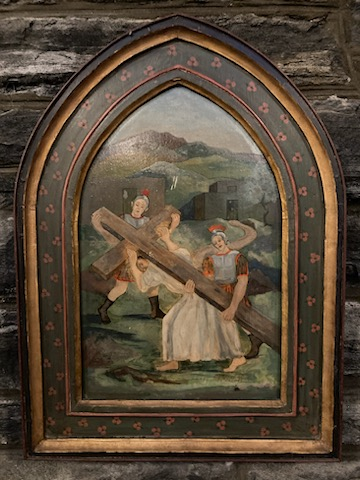
Jesus takes up his Cross (Station II)

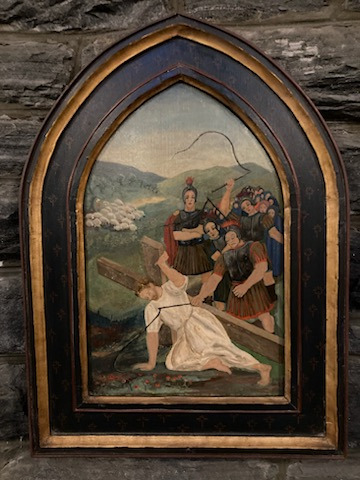
Jesus falls for the first time (Station III)

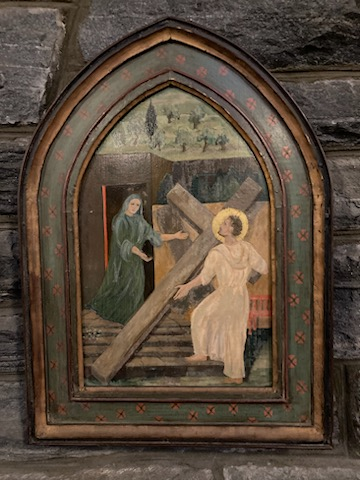
Jesus meets his Mother (Station IV)

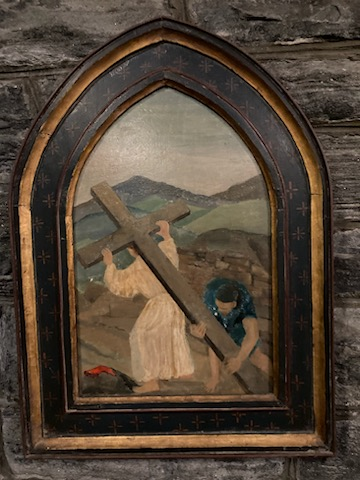
Simon of Cyrene helps Jesus carry the Cross (Station V)

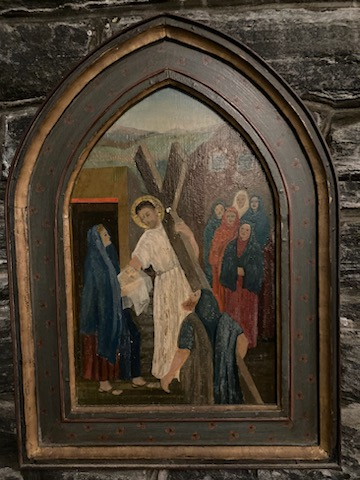
Saint Veronica wipes the face of Jesus (Station VI)

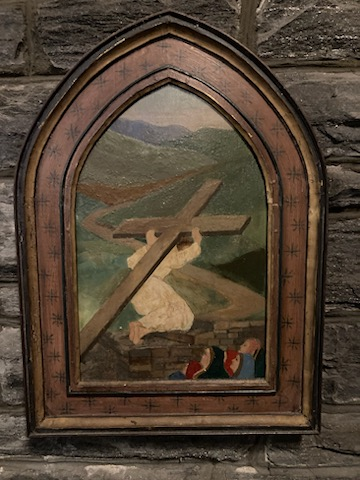
Jesus falls for the second time (Station VII)

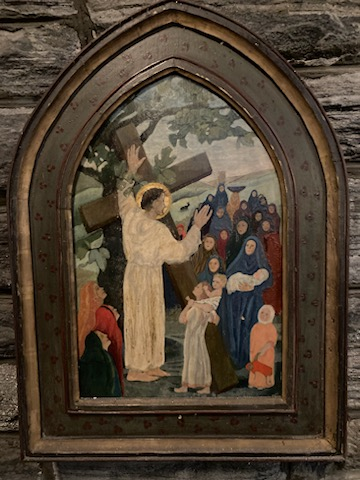
Jesus meets the women of Jerusalem (Station VIII)

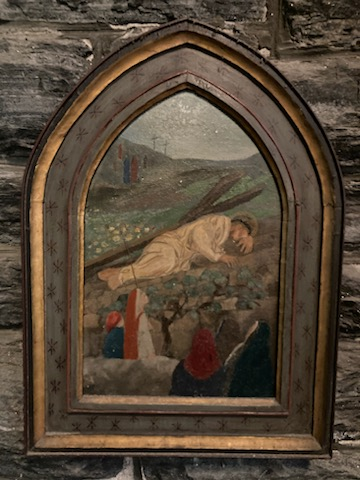
Jesus falls for the third time (Station IX)

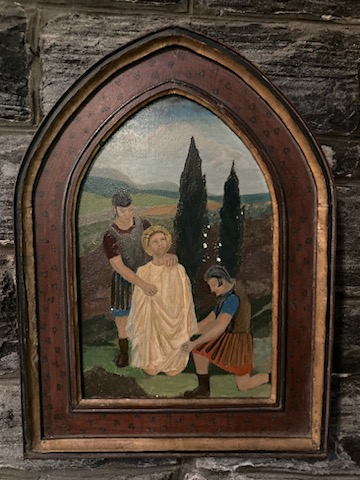
Jesus is stripped (Station X)

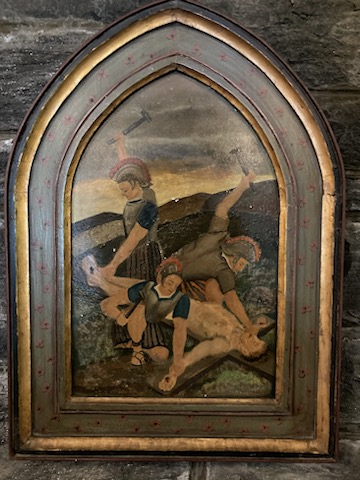
Jesus is nailed to the Cross (Station XI)

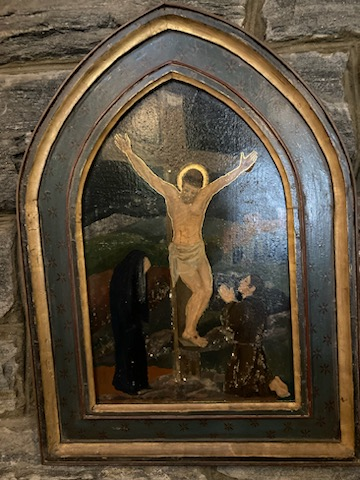
Jesus dies on the Cross (Station XII)

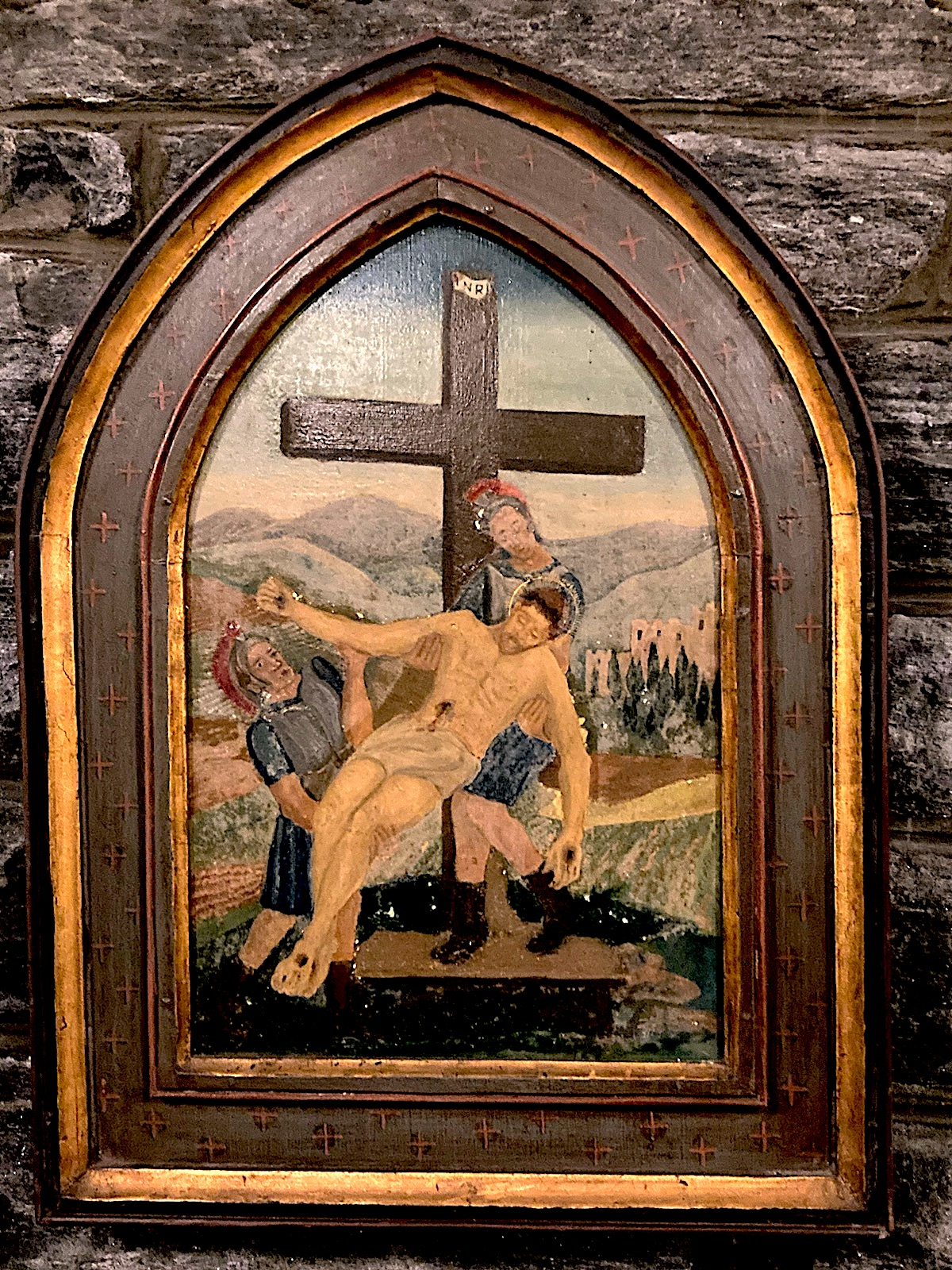
Descent from the Cross (Station XIII)

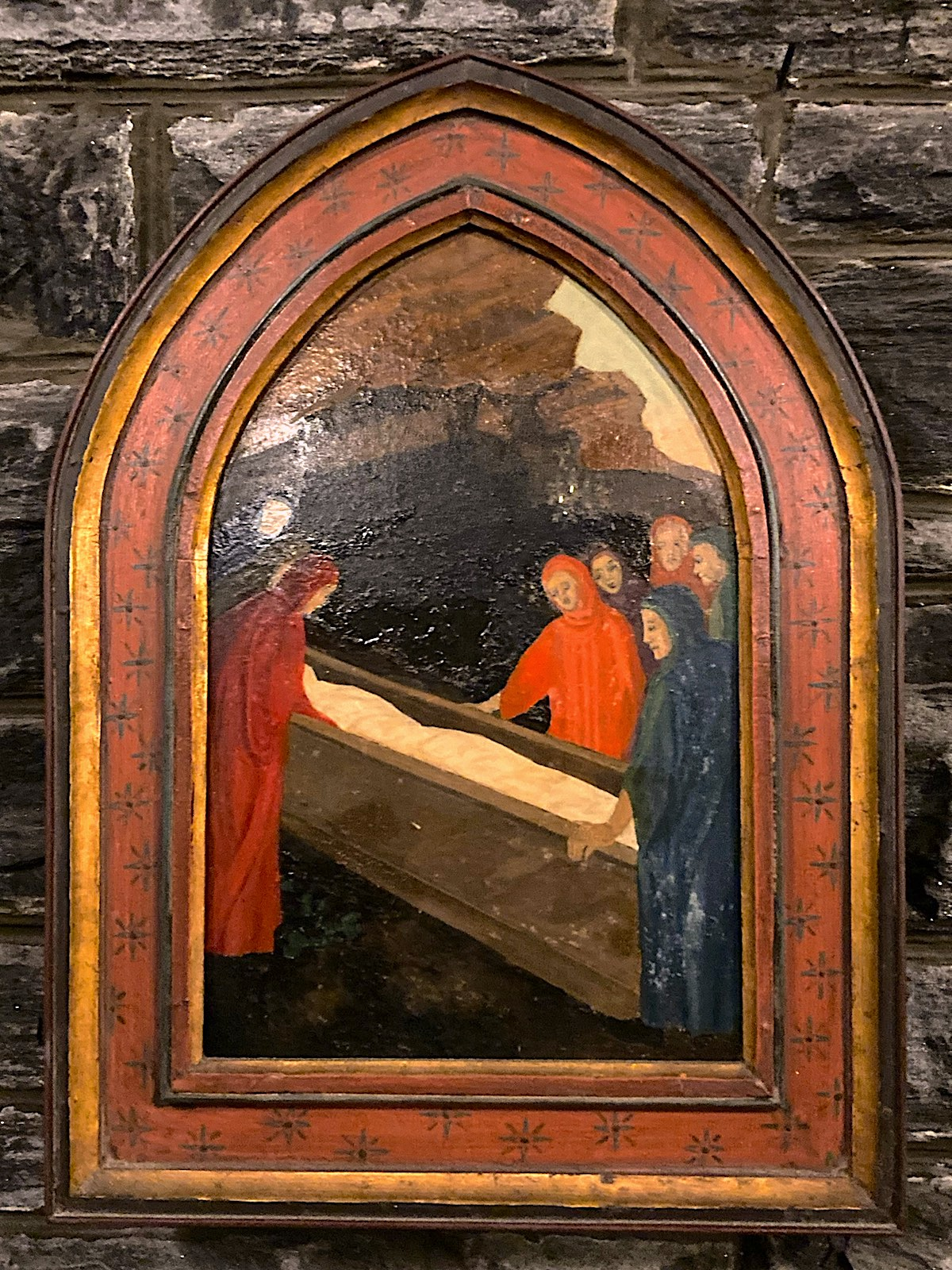
The entombment of Christ (Station XIV)

== See also ==
- Anglican eucharistic theology
- Church architecture
- Churchmanship
- Gothic architecture
- Harvey Butterfield (former assistant priest at the parish)

== Bibliography ==
- Hill, J. Bennett (2005). A Guide to the Architecture, the Windows, and the Furnishings and Ornaments of the Church of the Good Shepherd, Rosemont, Pennsylvania. Rosemont, Pennsylvania: Church of the Good Shepherd.
- Dedication of the Parish House of the Memorial Church of the Good Shepherd, Rosemont, Pa. (1910)
- Charles Townsend, The Lord's Service for the Lord's Children (1921), historical photographs of worship at the church
- E. Osborne Coates, Historical Sketch of the Church of the Good Shepherd, Rosemont (1934) Digitized by Richard Mammana, 2023.
- Liturgical Manual of the Church of the Good Shepherd, Rosemont, Pennsylvania (1987)
- Good Shepherd, Rosemont Centennial Eucharist (1993)
