= Daniel G. P. Gutierrez =

American Episcopal bishop (born 1964)

The Right Reverend Daniel G. P. Gutiérrez
- Bishop of Pennsylvania
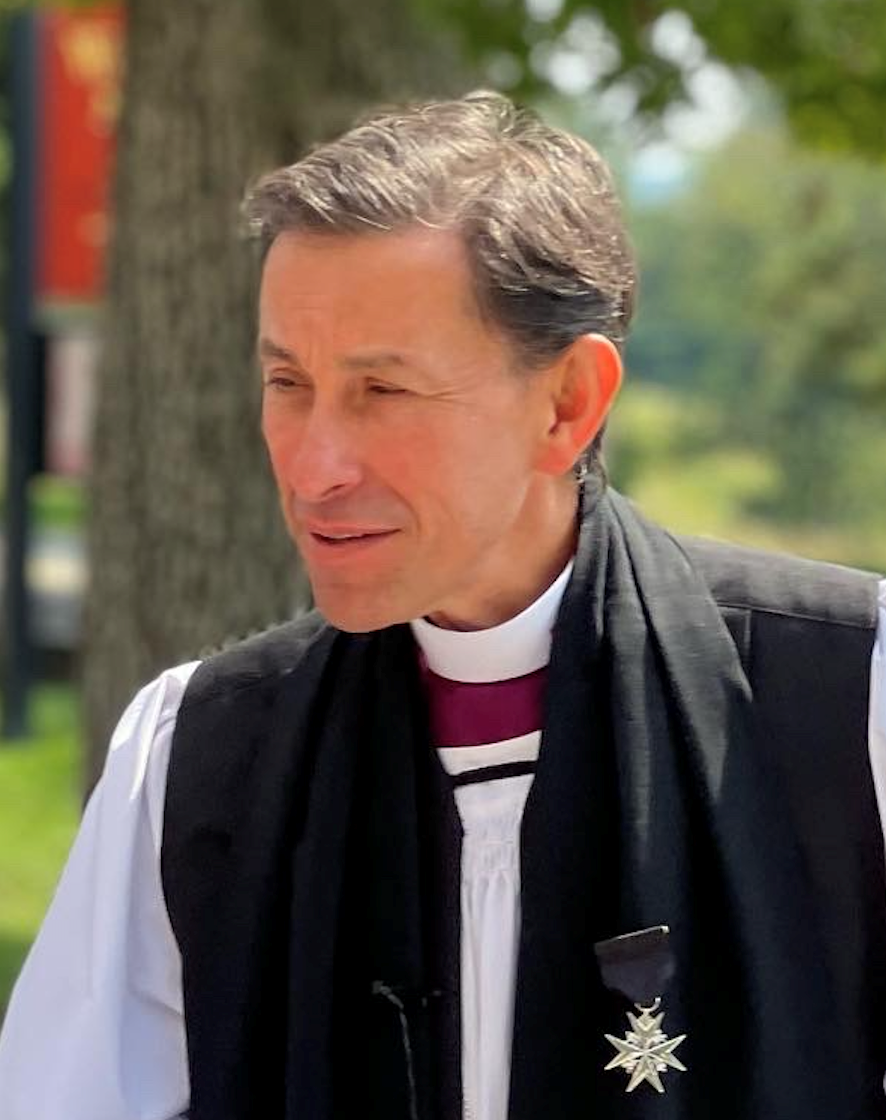
- Church: Episcopal Church
- Elected: March 12, 2016
- In office: 2016–present
- Predecessor: Charles Bennison
- Previous post: Canon to the Ordinary at Diocese of the Rio Grande

Orders
- Ordination: December 12, 2008
- Consecration: July 16, 2016 by Michael B. Curry

Personal details
- Born: October 7, 1964 (age 62) Albuquerque, New Mexico, U.S.
- Denomination: Anglican (prev. Roman Catholic)
- Spouse: Suzanne Fletcher (m. 1991)
- Children: 1
- Education: University of New Mexico; Trinity School for Ministry; St. Norbert College

Daniel George Policarpio Gutiérrez (born 1964) is the 16th and current bishop of the Episcopal Diocese of Pennsylvania, the second oldest and fourth largest in the country. He was elected and consecrated in 2016, and previously served as Canon to the Ordinary in the Episcopal Diocese of the Rio Grande.

== Early life and education ==
Gutiérrez was born in Albuquerque, New Mexico and raised Roman Catholic. His ancestors arrived in New Mexico from Spain in the late 1500s. He is an alumnus of the University of New Mexico, receiving bachelor's degrees in history and political science in 1987, and a master's degree in public administration in 1992. He also completed a certificate in Anglican studies from Trinity School for Ministry in 2007 and a master of theological studies degree from St. Norbert College in 2011.

== Career ==
Before his ministry, Gutiérrez had a distinguished career in public service. He served as chief of staff to former Albuquerque Mayor Martin Chavez, as director of the Bernalillo County Economic Development Department. In 1998, he founded a political strategy and media relations firm.

Bishop William Carl Frey ordained Gutierrez to the diaconate on June 7, 2008, and Bishop James Mathes ordained him to the priesthood on December 12, 2008. Gutiérrez was the first native born New Mexican ordained a Priest in the Diocese of the Rio Grande. He served at the parish of Saint Michael and All Angels and the Cathedral Church of St. John in Albuquerque from 2008 until 2011, when he became canon to the ordinary, chief operating officer and chief of staff within the diocese. He also oversaw the Navajoland area mission. While Canon to the Ordinary he was instrumental in the construction and creation of the Bosque Retreat Center as well as rebuilding Our Lady in the Valley Episcopal Church in Albuquerque and St. Francis Episcopal in Rio Rancho. In appreciation for his work at Our Lady in the Valley, the congregation named their Parish Hall in his honor.

On March 12, 2016, a special diocesan convention elected him to succeed Charles Bennison, who had retired in 2012. Clifton Daniel III had served as provisional bishop since 2013. Gutiérrez led in both orders on each of the four ballots. Gutiérrez was elected on the fourth ballot, receiving 100 votes in the lay order and 133 in the clergy order. On that ballot, 84 lay votes and 130 clergy votes were needed for an election.

Gutiérrez was consecrated on July 16, 2016, by Presiding Bishop Michael B. Curry; Gutiérrez's former bishop, Michael Vono, delivered the sermon. Gutiérrez vowed to visit each of the 132 congregations in his diocese within six months, and began blogging his pilgrimage of faith.

In February, 2020 it was announced that Gutiérrez was elected President of the Compass Rose Society, succeeding C. Andrew Doyle.

In 2024 Gutiérrez was shortlisted to succeed Michael Curry as Presiding Bishop of the Episcopal Church.

== Personal life ==
Gutiérrez married Suzanne Fletcher in 1991 and they have a son, Jude, Dana their daughter in law and three grandchildren He was made a member of the Venerable Order of St John in 2018.

== See also ==
- List of Episcopal bishops of the United States
- Historical list of the Episcopal bishops of the United States

Episcopal Church (USA) titles
Preceded by Charles Bennison	Bishop of Pennsylvania; 2016–current	Incumbent
