= David Moyer =

David Lloyd Moyer is a former American bishop. He was a priest of the Episcopal Church before becoming a bishop of the Anglican Church in America, a Continuing Anglicanism body. After being deposed from the Episcopal Church and denied entry into the Roman Catholic Church as a cleric in 2012, he was received as a layman in 2014. His former congregation, then known as the Blessed John Henry Newman Catholic Community of Strafford, Pennsylvania, prepared to enter the Personal Ordinariate of the Chair of St. Peter, the North American ordinariate for former Anglicans. The community later merged with a second local Anglican ordinariate group to form St. John the Baptist Catholic Church in Bridgeport, Pennsylvania.

== Early life and education ==
Moyer holds degrees from Whittier College (B.A.), Seabury-Western Theological Seminary (M. Div.), New York Theological Seminary (S.T.M.), and Princeton Theological Seminary (D.Min). He also attended Muhlenberg College as an undergraduate.

== Anglican ministry ==
Moyer was ordained to the diaconate and priesthood in 1976. After serving parishes in the Dioceses of New York, Albany, and Eastern Newfoundland and Labrador, he became rector of the Church of the Good Shepherd (Rosemont, Pennsylvania) in 1989, a post he held until 2011. As a priest, he was a member of the Anglo-Catholic Society of the Holy Cross (SSC). He was dean of the St. Lawrence Deanery in the Diocese of Albany from 1985 to 1989. He was president of the Philadelphia chapter of the Catholic Clerical Union from 1990 to 1997. Moyer received the Episcopal Synod of America President's Award for Meritorious Service in 1995.

After a public feud with Bishop Charles Bennison, Moyer was deposed by Bennison and charged with having left the Episcopal Church. He was accepted into the Diocese of Pittsburgh by Bishop Robert Duncan, but later transferred to the Diocese of Upper Shire, under the authority of the Archbishop of Central Africa, Bernard Malango. Moyer remained as rector the Church of the Good Shepherd by choice of the congregation. He was consecrated a bishop in the Traditional Anglican Communion (TAC), a Continuing Anglicanism body, on February 16, 2005. He served as the Bishop of the Armed Forces for the Anglican Church in America. He was also the episcopal visitor for the TAC in England and the American commissary of the Diocese of The Murray in Australia.

In 2011, after litigation, Moyer was ordered to leave the premises of Good Shepherd, Rosemont. At that time, a majority of the congregation left with him to form the group that is now part of the Personal Ordinariate of the Chair of Saint Peter. In 2012, his petition to enter the Catholic Church as an ordained minister was accepted by the Vatican (The Congregation of the Doctrine of Faith, i.e. Nulla Osta) but he did not receive local ecclesial approval, the Votum In 2014, he was received into the Roman Catholic Church as a layman.

== Personal life ==
Moyer is married to Rita Moyer (née Hawkins). They are the parents of three grown children and have five grandchildren
