= Charles E. Bennison =

American bishop

The Right Reverend Charles E. Bennison
- Bishop of Pennsylvania
- Church: Episcopal Church
- Diocese: Pennsylvania
- Elected: October 19, 1996
- In office: 1998–2012
- Predecessor: Allen L. Bartlett
- Successor: Clifton Daniel, provisional bishop
- Previous post: Coadjutor Bishop of Pennsylvania (1997-1998)

Orders
- Ordination: July 13, 1969 by Charles E. Bennison Sr.
- Consecration: February 27, 1997 by Edmond L. Browning
- Rank: 927 in the American Succession

Personal details
- Born: November 30, 1943 (age 82) Minneapolis, Minnesota, United States
- Denomination: Anglican
- Parents: Charles E. Bennison Sr. and Marjorie Elizabeth Haglun
- Spouse: Joan Kathryn Reahard
- Children: 2

Charles Ellsworth Bennison Jr. (born November 30, 1943) is an American bishop. He was the 15th bishop of the Episcopal Diocese of Pennsylvania.

== Education and family ==
Bennison was born in Minneapolis, Minnesota, on November 30, 1943, and was baptized at St. Luke's Episcopal Church in Hastings, Minnesota, on December 24, 1943. His father, Charles E. Bennison Sr., was also a priest who went on to become the Bishop of Western Michigan.

Bennison received a B.A. degree summa cum laude from Lawrence University in Appleton, Wisconsin, in 1965. In 1965–66, he studied at Seabury-Western Theological Seminary, and then attended Harvard Divinity School, where he received a B.D. degree in 1968 and a Th.M. degree in 1970. He earned his M.A. degree from the Claremont Graduate School in 1977, and a S.T.M. degree from Union Theological Seminary in 1992. He was honored with a Doctor of Divinity degree from Episcopal Divinity School in Cambridge, Massachusetts, in 1997.

Bennison married Joan Kathryn Reahard; they have two daughters, Sarah and Kathryn.

== Ministerial and academic career ==
Ordained a deacon in 1968 and a priest in 1969, Bennison began his full-time ministry in 1971 as rector of St. Mark's Church in Upland, California, where he was founder of St. Mark's Episcopal School, St. Mark's Homeless Shelter, and new congregations in Rancho Cucamonga and Chino, California.

In the Episcopal Diocese of Los Angeles, he chaired the Program Group on Social Relations and the Standing Committee, served as president of the Corporation of the Diocese, taught at the Episcopal Theological School at Claremont Graduate School, and was a frequent reader of the General Ordination Examinations. He served as a member of Venture in Mission Board, the Los Angeles Jewish-Christian-Muslim Trialogue, the Anglican-Roman Catholic Commission, and numerous other bodies. In 1987, he was recognized by the Pomona Valley Council of Churches for outstanding leadership in ecumenical affairs. That year he was also among the nominees considered to replace Robert Rusack as bishop of the diocese, a position that ultimately went to Frederick Borsch.

From 1988 to 1991, he was rector of St. Luke's Church in Atlanta, Georgia, where he substantially raised stewardship giving, broadened the participation of laity in the governance of the parish, and initiated a process leading to the acquisition of significant real estate holdings.

Bennison has been a fellow of the College of Preachers (Note: This is a program of the Protestant Episcopal Cathedral Foundation.) and a Masland fellow at Union Theological Seminary. In 1992, he was elected to the faculty of Episcopal Divinity School, where he served as associate professor of Pastoral theology and founded the program in Congregational Studies.

== Bishop of Pennsylvania ==
Bennison was elected Bishop Coadjutor of the Episcopal Diocese of Pennsylvania at a special convention held on October 19, 1996, at the Cathedral Church of the Savior in Philadelphia and was consecrated as a bishop on February 27, 1997 at the Deliverance Evangelistic Church in Philadelphia. He was made the diocesan bishop on May 16, 1998.

== Controversies ==
Bennison's tenure as Bishop of Pennsylvania was marked by controversies. Early in his episcopacy, Bennison became an important figure in the ongoing tension between liberal and conservative factions in the Episcopal Church. Theological disagreements with conservative Anglo-Catholic parishes led to extended legal battles over control of church property. In the latter years of his episcopacy, Bennison faced opposition from liberals and conservatives alike regarding diocesan finances and the purchase of a multimillion-dollar 434 acre waterfront site on the Chesapeake Bay in Maryland that was developed as "Wapiti", a summer camp for youth and a diocesan conference center.

=== Disputes with traditionalist Anglo-Catholic parishes ===
In 1994–1995, seven Anglo-Catholic priests opposed to the ordination of women made an agreement with the 14th bishop of Pennsylvania, Allen Bartlett, known as the "Parsons Plan." Under the terms of this plan, Donald Parsons, the retired bishop of the Episcopal Diocese of Quincy, would make episcopal visitations to several traditionalist parishes until the next General Convention. This arrangement was similar to the role of a provincial episcopal visitor in the Church of England.

In 1997, the General Convention adopted a resolution stating that "no member of this Church shall be denied a place in the life and governance of this Church on account of their sex or their theological views on the ordination of women," after which Bishop Bartlett decided not to renew the Parsons Plan. He retired later that year. Despite differences in churchmanship, traditionalist leaders in the diocese supported Charles Bennison's election under the impression that he would continue the provisions of the Parsons Plan. These leaders assert that they cast their votes for him after he gave them solemn assurance that he would continue the "Parsons Plan." After his installation as Bishop, he announced that he had "changed his mind" and would no longer consider the Parsons Plan. When Bennison elected not to reinstitute the arrangement, several crises arose in the diocese, compounded by theological differences between Bennison and several conservative parishes.

==== Theological disagreements ====
Disagreements between traditionalist priests and Bishop Bennison centered on Bennison's writings on homosexuality and Christology. Bennison was a signatory to the "Koinonia Statement", a 1994 letter authored by John Shelby Spong, retired bishop of the Episcopal Diocese of Newark. The statement affirmed the 1976 ordination of women and said that gay or lesbian relationships "that are faithful, monogamous, committed, life giving and holy are to be honored" and promised "support and protection" for gay and lesbian clergy. In 1997, while still coadjutor, Bennison published an article arguing that, "Because the legitimized paradigm institutionalized in the church's present marriage liturgy is a heterosexist one directed against gay men and lesbian women, a change in the rite is required to delegitimize that paradigm." He proposed 24 changes to the sacrament of marriage, some based on a "Visigothic rite," and wrote,

"In their relationships and families, lesbian and gay couples, in fact, often display a more enviable and ideal model of the church than do heterosexual couples. ... Anyone who has seen The Birdcage, Mike Nichols's rendition of the gay comedy classic "La Cage Aux Folles" with Robin Williams and Nathan Lane playing a gay couple ... knows that it looks like a mini-church. Throughout history gay and lesbian couples have established in their committed relationships such minichurches, and, if such is the nature of marriage, then the church ought to open to gay and lesbian couples the sacrament of marriage."

Bennison's statements on salvation and the doctrine of the Resurrection have been cited as a source of controversy. In a 2003 Easter Message, Bennison also wrote that Jesus "acknowledges his own sin. He knows himself to be forgiven." Many Christians interpreted this remark to be a denial of the sinlessness of Jesus.

==== Dispute with the Church of St. James the Less, Philadelphia ====
The Church of St. James the Less had, for many years, withheld its payments to the diocese in protest about the ordination of women. Bennison's decision to not renew the license of Fr. Willis, an assistant priest of St. James, further strained diocesan relations with the parish.

In 1999, the vestry of St. James the Less voted to transfer the property and assets of the parish to a nonprofit corporation called the "CSJL Foundation," in order to disassociate from the diocese and the Episcopal Church. In response to St James' attempt to secede from the diocese, Bishop Bennison declared the parish "inactive or extinct" and initiated litigation to seize its property. In 2003, the Philadelphia County Court of Common Pleas ruled that the attempted merger of St. James the Less with the CSJL Foundation was ultra vires and invalid, that the vestry was "ineligible to continue in their offices," and that the diocese could appoint or elect a new vestry. St. James lost two subsequent appeals, first to Commonwealth Court and then to the Supreme Court of Pennsylvania. Pursuant to the Supreme Court's decision, the diocese assumed control of the St. James property, and the congregation left to form an independent church.

==== Dispute with the Church of the Good Shepherd, Rosemont ====
Fr. David Moyer, Rector (1989–2011) of the Church of the Good Shepherd in Rosemont, Pennsylvania, was alleged to have refused to allow Bennison to make canonically-required episcopal visitations to Good Shepherd, saying the bishop "was too liberal and could not be trusted in the pulpit." The charge, however, was disputed by Moyer and by the Vestry of the Church of the Good Shepherd, who insisted that they only advised Bishop Bennison that a visit would not be helpful. Bennison was specifically invited to visit with the Vestry and to inspect the books and records of the Parish, which would have fulfilled his canonical responsibility. Moyer was publicly critical of Bennison's public statements regarding the veracity of the Bible and sexual teachings, denouncing Bennison's teachings as "apostate and heretical"

In March 2002, Bennison approved a decision by the Standing Committee of the Diocese of Pennsylvania to inhibit Moyer from exercising his priestly functions for six months under the canons of the church. In April 2002, Moyer sought help from bishops in the Anglican Communion as they gathered for pre-arranged meetings in London. The office of the Archbishop of Canterbury, George Carey, "indicated that were David Moyer to be in a position of seeking permission, he would have no hesitation in giving him permission to officiate in the Diocese of Canterbury"; since Carey was scheduled to retire that October, however, the issue would have to be resolved by his successor, Rowan Williams.

Moyer not having recanted, but insisting that he had not left the Episcopal Church as charged by Bennison, within the six-month period of inhibition, at the conclusion of the canonical inhibition Bennison deposed Moyer on September 4, 2002. Bennison deposed him using a canon designed for the removal from the official list of priests a priest who has left the church, rather than using the canon for disciplining of a wayward priest that provides for a church trial in which the priest may contest charges against him. Bennison explained, "I deposed him because he had over a decade shown a pattern of a series of canonical failures, one after another. Under his leadership, his parish has become increasingly alienated from his diocese.".

On September 5, 2002, Moyer was received by Robert Duncan, Bishop of Pittsburgh, as a priest in good standing, although it is unclear whether such reception was permissible under the canon law of the Episcopal Church. Subsequently, Moyer served as dean of the conservative group Forward in Faith North America in 2004, and was consecrated as a bishop in the Traditional Anglican Communion on February 16, 2005, though he continued to serve as rector at the Church of the Good Shepherd until August 2011. A Montgomery County, Pennsylvania, court found in the matter of Moyer v. Bennison, et al., on October 24, 2008, that there was no fraud on the part of Bennison, the charge on which the case turned.

=== Diocesan financial dispute ===
During Bennison's episcopacy, the Diocese of Pennsylvania developed divisions over the management of church finances. Calls arose for Bennison to step down, which he resisted. The financial crisis came to a head in 2006, when the Standing Committee of the diocese voted twice to request Bennison's resignation, alleging the misappropriation of approximately $11.6 million from diocesan trust funds. This followed the committee's repeated refusal to accept the reappointment of diocesan chancellor William Bullitt, who advised Bennison on financial matters, and the defeat of the 2006 budget in a diocesan convention. A major point of controversy was the planned use of $1.2 million in unrestricted net assets. Meanwhile, the Diocesan Council passed a resolution in support of Bennison, and Bishop Clayton Matthews of the church Office of Pastoral Development was called in to mediate.

On November 6, 2006, the Standing Committee filed a complaint against Bennison with church authorities, charging that he had usurped its "canonical prerogatives and authority" by spending money and transferring funds without the committee's consent. Bennison responded that the complaint had no merit, saying, "I have never spent any money in the diocese without the approbation of various governance bodies." The chancellor to Presiding Bishop Katharine Jefferts Schori forwarded the complaint to a review committee in March 2007.

=== Handling of a sexual misconduct case from the 1970s ===
During the diocesan financial controversy in 2006, allegations first made in 1979 were raised once again that Bennison, when he was serving as rector of a California parish in the 1970s, failed to respond appropriately to charges that his brother, John Bennison, had engaged in sexual misconduct while serving at St. Mark's Church in Upland, California. At the time John was in graduate theological studies, and Charles had hired him to serve as a part-time youth leader of St Mark's. Although married, John was alleged to have had sexual relationships with several persons, including one who was allegedly 14. According to one newspaper reporter, John was alleged to have had sexual intercourse with the teen over a four-year period, both on and off the premises of St. Mark's Church. However, in a subsequent deposition for Bishop Bennison's trial, the former teen acknowledged her sexual abuse at the age of 14 consisted of a back rub during a youth group meeting when she "felt funny."

In 1975, John left St. Mark's. In 1977, John acknowledged his failures, voluntarily left the priesthood, and was deposed by Bishop of Los Angeles Robert Rusack. In 1979, after meeting all canonical requirements, John was restored to the priesthood by the same bishop, who—according to subsequent trial testimony—was fully cognizant of the prior allegations of misconduct. In 1992, the same charges from the 1970s were raised once again. After a formal church investigation, the parish where John was then serving as rector responded with a unanimous vote of confidence for their priest. Finally, in 2006, Survivors Network of those Abused by Priests (SNAP) initiated a campaign calling for John's resignation. On June 12, 2006, Bishop of California William Swing announced his resignation from the parish and his deposition from the pastoral ministry.

Meanwhile, although there had been these two prior public adjudications of the same matter, first in 1979, then in 1992, Bishop Bennison's critics said that he had concealed the alleged abuse of the minor from church authorities and police. Charles Bennison initially said he had learned of the allegations from the girl's parents and promptly fired his brother. He acknowledged not having reported the matter to civil or ecclesiastical authorities at the time, saying, "I did not think it was my prerogative to do so on my own" (because the girl's parents had not chosen to report the matter to the police). The girl's mother, June Alexis, disputed this account, based on a 1978 letter from Bennison that she says indicate that he knew that their daughter was being abused by his brother, but did not tell them. John's ex-wife, Margaret Thompson, produced another letter from 1979 in which Charles Bennison asked her not to visit the parish because of the potential for "a public scandal here which, I believe, could cost me my job." John's victim has stated that "she and John were twice interrupted during sex by Charles Bennison's arrival at his brother's apartment" (although it is unclear whether she alleges that Bishop Bennison saw them in a compromising situation).

At the annual diocesan convention on November 11, 2006, Bennison said:

"Reading the statements from last weekend's sessions reminded me that it was probably the senior warden, not the girl's mother, who in 1975 reported John's abuse, after which I immediately told him to leave the parish, and that in order to maintain the confidentiality of both John and the girl, I did not tell the parents, who nonetheless confronted me when they had found out four years later. Until reading the statements I had never before known that John's destructive behavior did not stop, but rather increased, in the parish to which he went after leaving my parish. That I could have prevented that from happening had I known to act differently is extremely grievous to me. My efforts to maintain confidentiality and prevent scandal were very misguided."

He acknowledged a "failure in the 1970s to act more assertively with regard to my brother, his victims, and the church," but also reassured people that the church had since established reporting and disciplinary procedures so that, "What happened 30 years ago would not happen today."

Outside the convention, protesters renewed calls for Bennison's resignation. Inside, a motion to hold him accountable narrowly failed. Instead, a study of the impact of sexual abuse by clergy was authorized almost unanimously. Unlike the previous year, the convention was able to adopt a $3.45 million program budget.

==== Presentment of charges and inhibition from ordained ministry ====
On October 28, 2007, a judicial committee of the Episcopal Church issued a presentment of charges against Bennison. The two charges contained in the presentment were "contemporaneous failure to respond properly" when he learned of his brother's sexual misconduct and the "subsequent suppression of pertinent information." Three days later, Katharine Jefferts Schori, the Presiding Bishop of the Episcopal Church inhibited Bennison "from all ordained ministry pending a judgment of the Court for the Trial of a Bishop". The Episcopal Church's Court for the Trial of a Bishop is a nine-member body consisting of both clergy and laity.

==== Conviction by an ecclesiastical court and deposition ====
On June 25, 2008, the Court for the Trial of a Bishop unanimously convicted Bennison on the first count (that he knowingly did nothing while his brother John, also a cleric, engaged in sexual relations with a minor) and six of the members voted to convict him on the second count (that he covered up his brother's sexual misconduct). Both the Most Reverend Katherine Jefferts Schori, the Presiding Bishop of the Episcopal Church, and the standing committee of the diocese asked for his permanent deposition from holy orders and a ban against him having any ministerial function in the Episcopal Church.

On October 3, 2008, the Court for the Trial of a Bishop handed down its sentence, formally deposing Bennison from holy orders. Specifically it stated that "The court finds that even today [Bennison] has not shown that he comprehends the nature, significance and effect of his conduct and has not accepted responsibility and repented for his conduct and the substantial negative effects of that conduct."

==== Subsequent motions, successful appeal, and reinstatement ====
Bennison later filed a motion seeking a reduction of his sentence, but in February 2009 the court upheld its decision to depose Bennison. Subsequently, Bennison appealed his conviction to the Court of Review for the Trial of a Bishop, a separate court composed of nine bishops.

Meanwhile, on April 17, 2009, Bennison's attorney filed a motion with the Court for the Trial of a Bishop requesting a new trial, citing newly uncovered exculpatory evidence. According to Bennison's attorney, more than 200 letters, written by the then-teenage female to John, were discovered that contradicted witness testimony at the trial. Bennison's attorney asserted that the letters showed that the teenage girl actively tried to cover up her relationship with John, leaving Charles Bennison unaware of the situation and therefore unable to take appropriate action. On September 24, 2009, the Court for the Trial of a Bishop denied the motion for a new trial.

Following the denial of a new trial, Bennison then pursued his appeal to the Court of Review for the Trial of a Bishop, which heard his case in Wilmington, Delaware on May 4, 2010. The basis for the appeal was a statute of limitation provision that had been in effect before a Presentment charge had ever been filed against Bishop Bennison. While Bishop Bennison's attorney had repeatedly raised the matter of the limitation statute, the earlier trial court had declined to rule on the issue for unexplained reasons.

On August 4, 2010, the Court of Review reversed the trial court's decision, and Bennison shortly afterward returned as Bishop of Pennsylvania. On September 21, 2010, however, the House of Bishops adopted a strongly worded yet nonbinding resolution urging Bennison to resign.

On October 9, 2012, Bennison announced his retirement as Bishop of Pennsylvania as of December 31, 2012. On January 12, 2013, Clifton Daniel was elected provisional bishop for a period of two years or until a new diocesan bishop was chosen; Daniel G. P. Gutierrez was elected to the position in July 2016.

== Publications ==
- Bennison, Charles E. In Praise of Congregations: Leadership in the Local Church Today. Cowley Publications, 1998. ISBN 9781561011513

== Notes ==
Episcopal Church (USA) titles
Preceded by Allen L. Bartlett	15th Bishop of Pennsylvania; 1998–2012	Succeeded by Clifton Daniel
