= CityLab (disambiguation) =

CityLab may refer to:

- CityLab (laboratory), laboratory at the Boston University School of Medicine
- CityLab (web magazine), a website created by The Atlantic now owned by Bloomberg Media
- Citilabs, a company acquired by Bentley Systems
- cityLAB (research center), a research center within UCLA's Department of Architecture and Urban Design

== See also ==
- Citylab-Orlando
- Citilab
