= Kevin Sullivan (artist) =

American artist (1964–2025)

- Born: 1964; San Francisco
- Died: 2025 (aged 60–61); Los Angeles
- Education: UCLA
- Occupation: Artist
- Known for: Painting, Performance Art

Kevin Sullivan (1964-2025), was an American visual artist and musician who lived and worked in Los Angeles, California.

== Education ==
Sullivan's early education was in California's public school system, including Homestead High School (Cupertino, California) where he was the cartoonist for the Homestead Epitaph. Later, he attended University of California, Los Angeles (UCLA), where his interest in the fine arts intensified and was encouraged by UCLA School of the Arts and Architecture professors Paul McCarthy and Don Suggs. McCarthy's support helped earn him UCLA's Clifton Webb Award for his achievement in performance art. Sullivan earned a Bachelor of Arts degree from UCLA in 1988.

== Background ==
Performance art, painting and writing continue to be his primary pursuits. Since 1984, he has enacted approximately 30 documented performances and eight solo exhibitions, and has been included in several dozen group exhibitions throughout the United States and in Europe. Art critic David Pagel has noted Sullivan's focus on "the potential significance of mundane events and apparently unremarkable occurrences". His subjects are often the neglected and abused cultural achievements of the past, as illustrated in his projects: Towards an Ape Theatre (2016), old taco bells (2014), This is Bruxism (2000), The Revolutionist (1998), Residuum (1991), and The Diaries of Paul Varnac (1988). In 1990, he curated the exhibition Frontier Tales with Jan Tumlir for Los Angeles Contemporary Exhibitions (LACE) which included the work of Clive Barker, Russell Crotty, Sandy Hubshman, Daniel Johnston, Gina Lamb, Joan Mahony, Craig Stecyk and Kamar Uwais. He has published three artist books, and his critical writing on art, music and film has appeared in the magazines Dirt, Raygun, Visions, Xtra and the transfixion blogspot, often under the name Sidral Mundet (a brand of Mexican soda pop).

== Career ==
Raw Power and Mayonnaise, 1991, oil, wax on canvas, 48” x 48”

During the early 1990s, Sullivan was represented by Sue Spaid Fine Art in Los Angeles and Jose Freire Fine Art in New York and achieved notoriety with his series Residuum, paintings based on old rock-and-roll album covers that focused on the materiality of those objects through the lens of fine art. The series was critically acclaimed by numerous periodicals, including Art in America, The New York Times, The San Francisco Examiner and The Atlanta Journal-Constitution, as well as the active interest of several collectors and curators. Sullivan's paintings Raw Power and Mayonnaise (1991) and Paranoid Gatefold with Grape Jelly (1993) were both prominently featured in the traveling exhibition and in the Prestel-Verlag catalog It's Only Rock and Roll, curated by David S. Rubin in 1995. Sullivan has been described as "an artist whose love/hate fanaticism for rock has gotten totally out of control", while his technical abilities as a painter have been called "experienced". His ability to "meticulously reproduce the tatters, jelly stains and doodles that these objects accrued" has been widely noted, but by 1995 he was no longer interested in appropriation or rock and roll as subject matter. In 2019 Los Angeles Modern Auctions stated that "Residuum offers a rubric for the successful synthesis of remarkably technical craftsmanship and the affective ambitions of vanguard conceptualism."

Unable to find support for his performance-related work Sullivan left the mainstream galleries in 1996 and continued showing in alternative and artist-run exhibitions, while also playing electric bass for the pop/rock group Maw and Paw. In 1996, he married Zazu Faure, designer, toy maker and daughter of Los Angeles art dealer Patricia Faure. By 1998 his artwork became more overtly political, evidenced by his performance related short film The Revolutionist (1998), which found critical support in curator Michael Darling who included it in his contribution to Performance Festival Odense in Denmark in 1999. According to Darling, "The Revolutionist combines a colonial, expansionist narrative with the distinctively retrogressive characters from Planet of the Apes to make an allegorical work propelled by ambiguous historical dynamics."

In 2002, Sullivan founded 401K, a company dedicated to architectural and cultural preservation that also oversees his book publications. He continues with live performance, generally in public spaces and often prompted by his writing and drawing. In 2016, he performed a reading of his essay Towards an Ape Theatre parts I-V on the streets of The Pasadena Playhouse District, exploring the relationship between Planet of the Apes, the radical theatre of Antonin Artaud and Jerzy Grotowski, Shakespeare and opera.

In 2017, Sullivan established the conceptual art rock and roll group The Simian Racket. He defined "art rock and roll" as a distinct social/musical phenomenon with roots in England's The Who. Sullivan highlights Pete Townshend's direct connection to performance artists Gustav Metzger and Raphael Montanez Ortiz, as well as The Who's 1965 proclamation they were an "auto-destructive group;" a term and concept Townshend adopted from his art instructor Metzger.

After numerous impromptu musical collaborations with unsuspecting participants, the final members of The Simian Racket included Bongo Carlos and Sullivan, performing as Stitch Jerkins..

In 2018 Sullivan was invited to participate in the 9th Internationale Waldkunstpfad in Darmstadt, Germany; a three week scholarship/residency consisting of symposiums, lectures, installations and performances in the Darmstadt forest, all conducted under the theme of Kunstokologie (Art Ecology). For the Waldkunstpfad (Forest Art Path), Sullivan enacted "Towards an Ape Theatre part VI: The Simian Racket", four distinct performance events, some lasting up to three hours, and consisting of readings, impromptu dialog and a non-electric form of rock and roll played on instruments built from forest materials and refuse.
