= Camino Nuevo Charter Academy =

Group of charter schools in California, US

Coordinates: 34.076464°N 118.285832°W

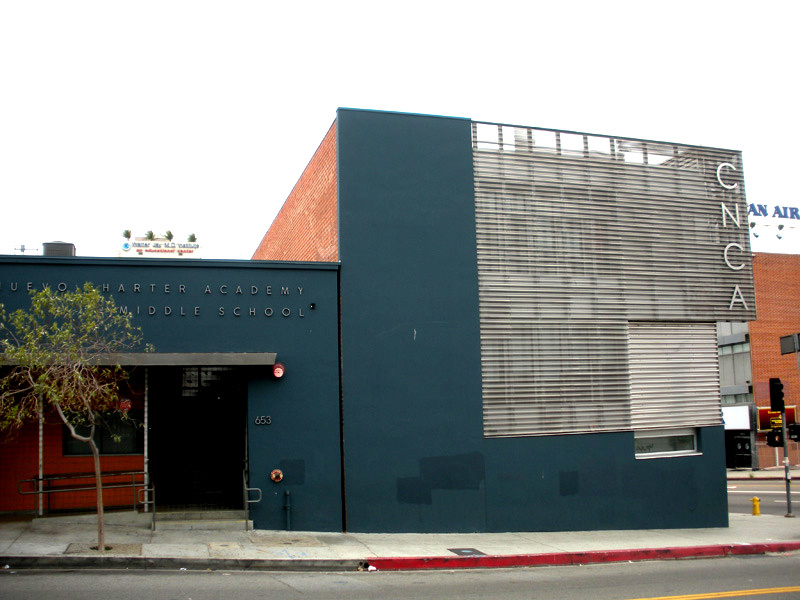
- Camino Nuevo Charter Academy
- 3500 West Temple Street; Los Angeles, CA 90004

Information
- Type: Public, Charter
- Established: 2000
- Enrollment: 930
- Website: Official website

Camino Nuevo Charter Academy is a group of charter schools serving the Westlake/MacArthur Park area of Los Angeles. In 2003 Camino Nuevo Charter Academy was awarded the Rudy Bruner Award for Urban Excellence gold medal. The school was founded by Philip Lance, an activist Episcopalian priest, community organizer, and psychologist.

Camino Nuevo Charter Academy operates two middle and two elementary schools in the same neighborhood. Students have a longer school day and year than students at traditional Los Angeles Unified School District schools, and smaller class sizes. Camino Nuevo schools are very involved with parents and the community at large; the school even operates a health clinic for family members.

Camino Nuevo High School, known as the Dalzell Lance Campus, received a 751 on its Academic Performance Index score, significantly higher than any other high school in its neighborhood. The school was awarded a 10 out of 10 from the state of California for its similar schools ranking. 80 percent of sophomores passed the CAHSEE on their first attempt, compared to only 67 percent of Los Angeles Unified School District students.

== Student body ==
Over ninety percent of students at Camino Nuevo High School qualify for free or reduced lunch, and 79% enter as English learners. As of the 2010–2011 school year, Camino Nuevo enrolls 3,100 students.

== Campuses ==
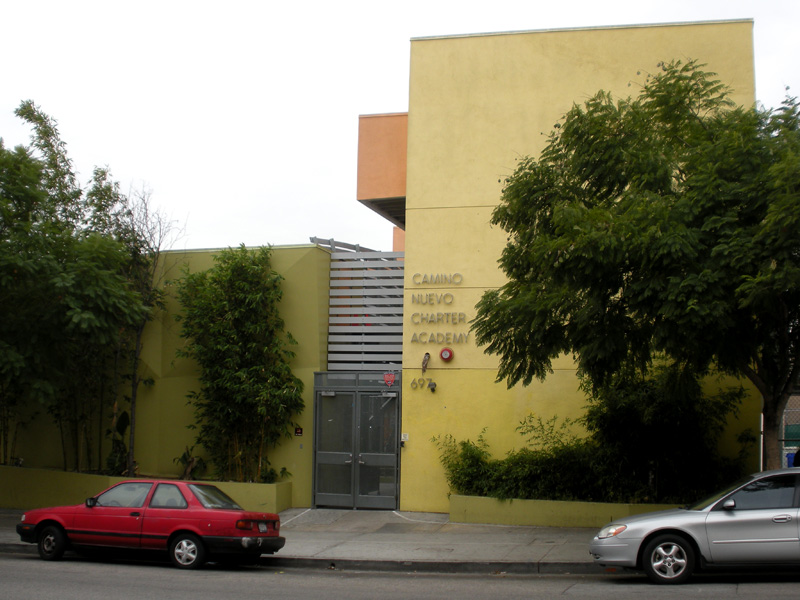
Camino Nuevo Charter Academy Burlington Early Childhood Education Center

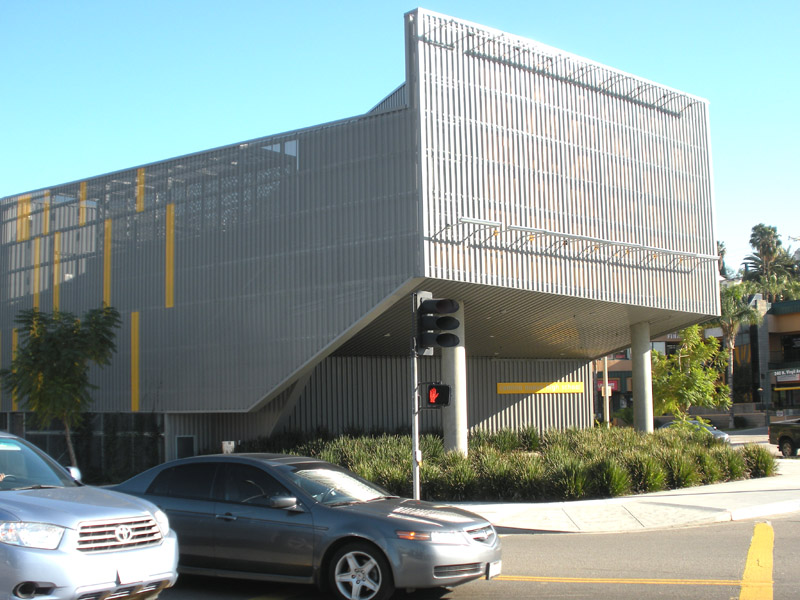
Camino Nuevo High School

=== High School ===
Camino Nuevo - Dalzell Lance High School: The school, which opened in 2004, is located at the corners of West Temple Street and Silverlake Boulevard in Los Angeles. The school serves students from a variety of local areas, including Koreatown, Rampart, Westlake, Downtown, Pico-Union, Silverlake, and Echo Park. Some students also travel from suburban cities like Canoga Park or Van Nuys; also from places like Highland Park and Lincoln Heights. In association with the Teach for America program, Camino Nuevo hires teachers training to earn their credentials in order to further the initiative to aid underserved communities.

The school's distinctive yellow-and-grey building was designed by Kevin Daly of Santa Monica-based Kevin Daly Architects.

=== TK-8 campuses ===
Five TK-8 campuses (Burlington K-8, Kayne Siart K-8, Cisneros K-8, and Castellanos K-5, and Eisner 6-8 sister sites).

== In the news ==
Three students from Camino Nuevo High School were interviewed on NPR's Morning Edition regarding the immigration debate in the U.S.

Camino Nuevo Charter High and Camino Nuevo Elementary "are in the bottom 5 percent of public K-12 schools as measured by the [California's] new accountability tool".
