= Douglas Sadownick =

American psychologist and writer

Douglas Sadownick (born 1959) is an American writer, activist, professor and psychotherapist.

== Biography ==
Born in Highbridge, Bronx in 1959, Douglas Sadownick attended Columbia College for his B.A., New York University for his graduate work in English, and the graduate program in clinical psychology at Antioch University for a Master's of Arts in Clinical Psychology. He received his PhD from Pacifica Graduate Institute in Clinical Psychology in 2006. His dissertation was entitled, Homosexual Enlightenment: A Gay Science Perspective on 19th Century German philosopher Friedrich Nietzsche's Thus Spoke Zarathustra.

He is the founding director of the nation's first LGBT Specialization in Clinical Psychology, at Antioch University, and he is also the Founder of Colors LGBTQ Youth Counseling Center, founded in 2011, with Philip Lance, an LGBT affirmative psychologist and community organizer. He is also a co-founding member of the Institute for Uranian Psychoanalysis, which is the first Institute in the world dedicated to deepening homosexual self-realization, a form of LGBT psychology. He was also a principal co-founder of Highways Performance Art Space in 1989.

His work Sacred Lips of the Bronx (St. Martin's Press, 1994) was nominated for a Lambda Literary Award. His second book, Sex Between Men: An Intimate History of the Sex Lives of Gay Men, Postwar to Present, was published by HarperOne in 1996 and 1997. His articles have appeared in the Advocate, the Los Angeles Times, Genre, High Performance, the New York Native, and the L.A. Weekly. He received a GLAAD award for excellence in reporting in 1991.

His paper, "Reading Literature Gay-Affirmatively: A Homosexual Individuation Story," was published in Spring 2006 in the journal Arts and Humanities.

== Life ==
In Love Doesn't Need a Reason the author, Jones, wrote that Michael Callen who was dying of AIDS requested that Douglas Sadownick and Tim should be granted power of attorney over him.

== Works ==
- Sacred Lips of the Bronx
- Sex Between Men: An Intimate History of the Sex Lives of Gay Men Postwar to Present
- Men on Men 4, an anthology
- The 'secret' story of the Radical Faeries
