= UCLA School of the Arts and Architecture =

Arts school of the University of California, Los Angeles

- Motto: Fiat lux Let there be light
- Type: Public
- Established: 1939
- Parent institution: University of California, Los Angeles
- Location: Los Angeles, California, United States
- Campus: Urban
- Mascot: Bruins
- Website: arts.ucla.edu

The UCLA School of the Arts and Architecture (UCLA Arts) is a professional school at the University of California, Los Angeles. Through its four degree-granting departments, it provides a range of course offerings and programs. Additionally, there are eight centers located within the school.

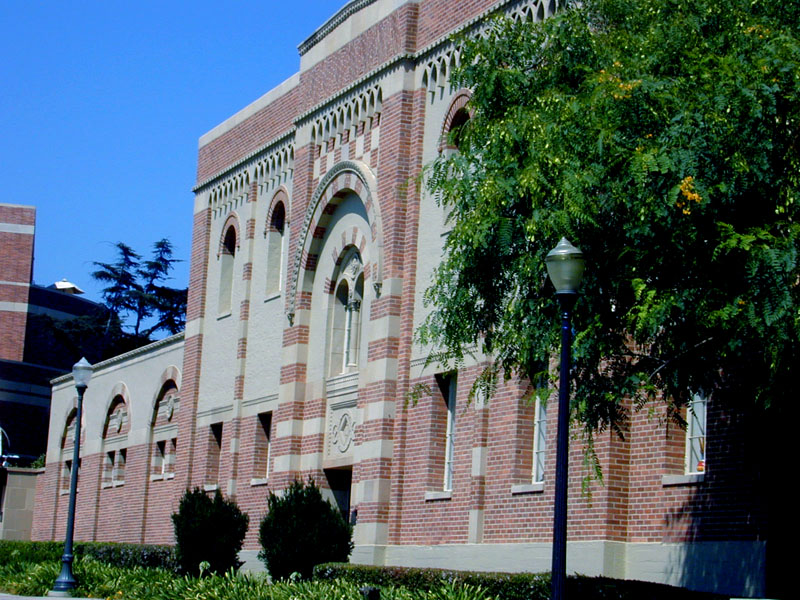
Glorya Kaufman Hall at the School of Arts and Architecture

== History ==
In 1919, UCLA's leadership demonstrated an early commitment to offer students opportunities to explore the arts by the establishment of an art gallery and a music department. But in 1939 the College of Applied Arts was founded with the addition of a Department of Art, followed by the College of Fine Arts in 1960, with degrees available in art, dance, music, and theater arts.

Following academic restructuring in the late 1980s, the UC Regents formally approved the establishment of two schools: the School of the Arts and the School of Theater, Film and Television. In 1994 architecture and urban design joined the School of the Arts, which became the School of the Arts and Architecture (UCLA Arts).

Brett Steele was appointed dean of the School of the Arts and Architecture in 2017.

== Departments ==
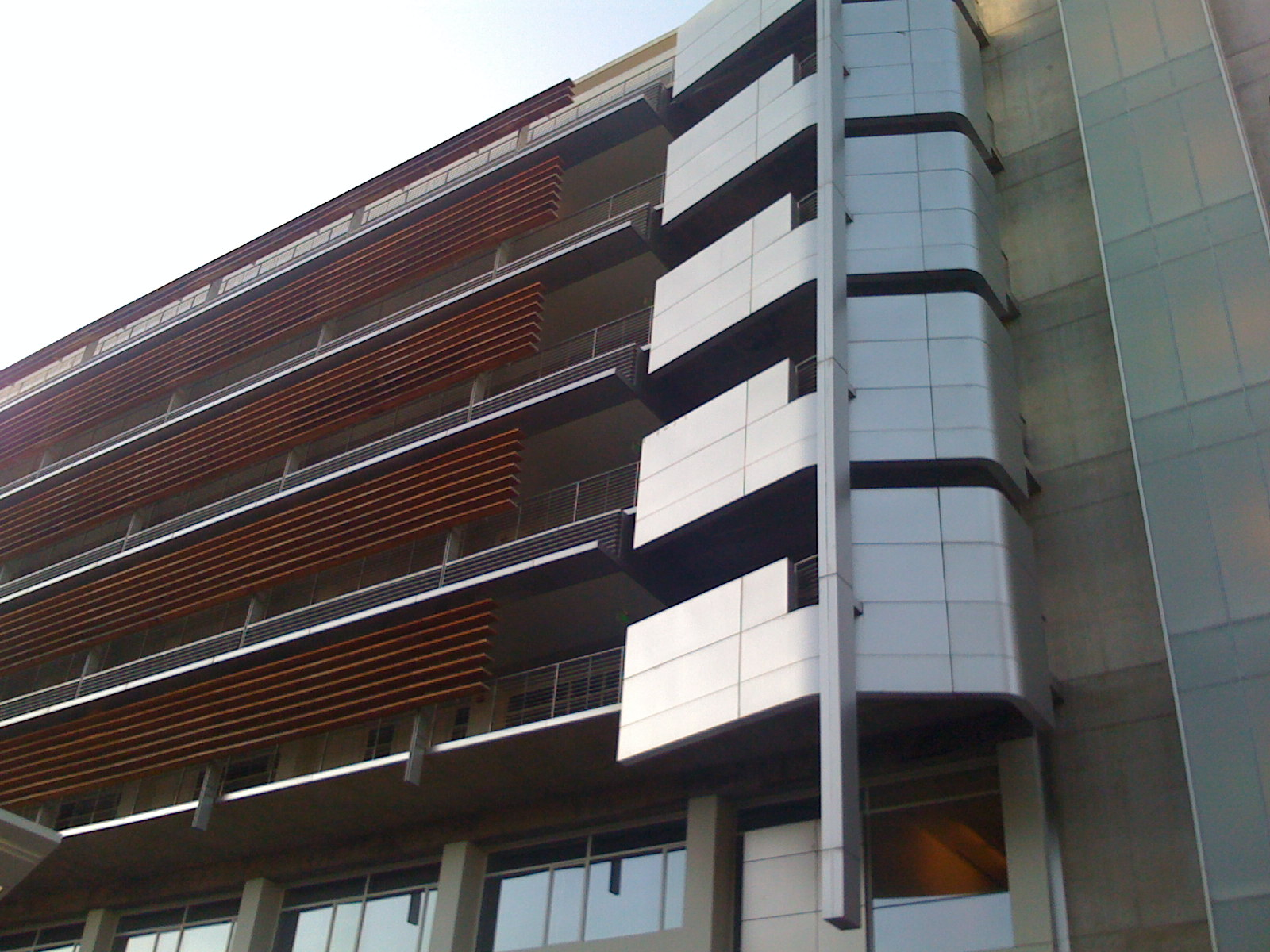
Broad Art Center, by Meier

- Architecture and Urban Design
- Art
- Design Media Arts
- World Arts and Cultures/Dance

== Facilities ==
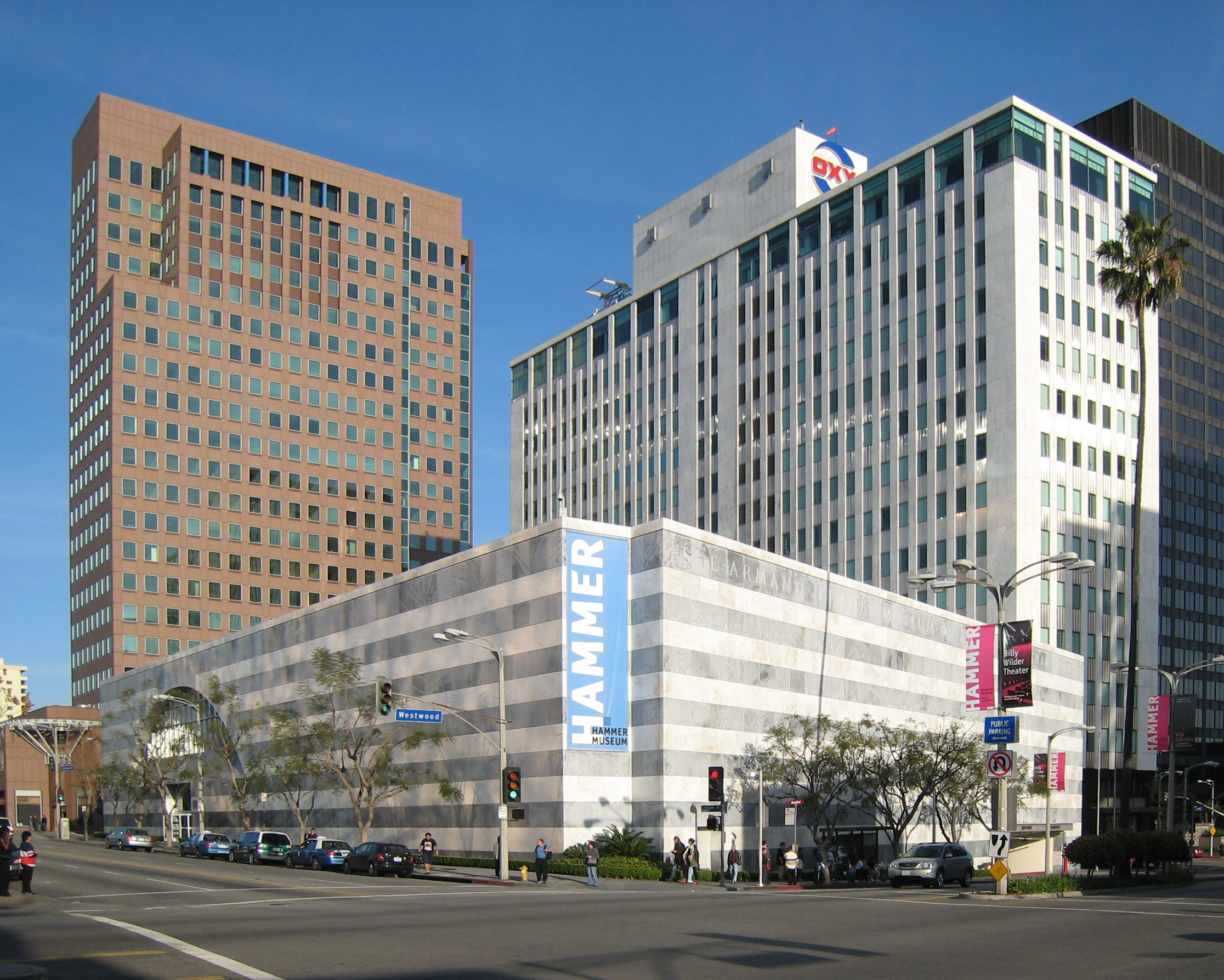
Hammer Museum on Wilshire and Westwood Blvds.

=== Production, Research, and Exhibition Units ===
- Art & Global Health Center
- Art | Sci Center
- Center for Intercultural Performance
- cityLAB
- Experiential Technologies Center
- Grunwald Center for the Graphic Arts
- New Wight Gallery

=== Facilities ===
- Eli and Edythe Broad Art Center (comprising the Design Media Arts and Art departments)
- Perloff Hall (consisting of the Architecture and Urban Design department)
- Glorya Kaufman Hall (consisting of the World Arts and Cultures department)

=== Institutions ===
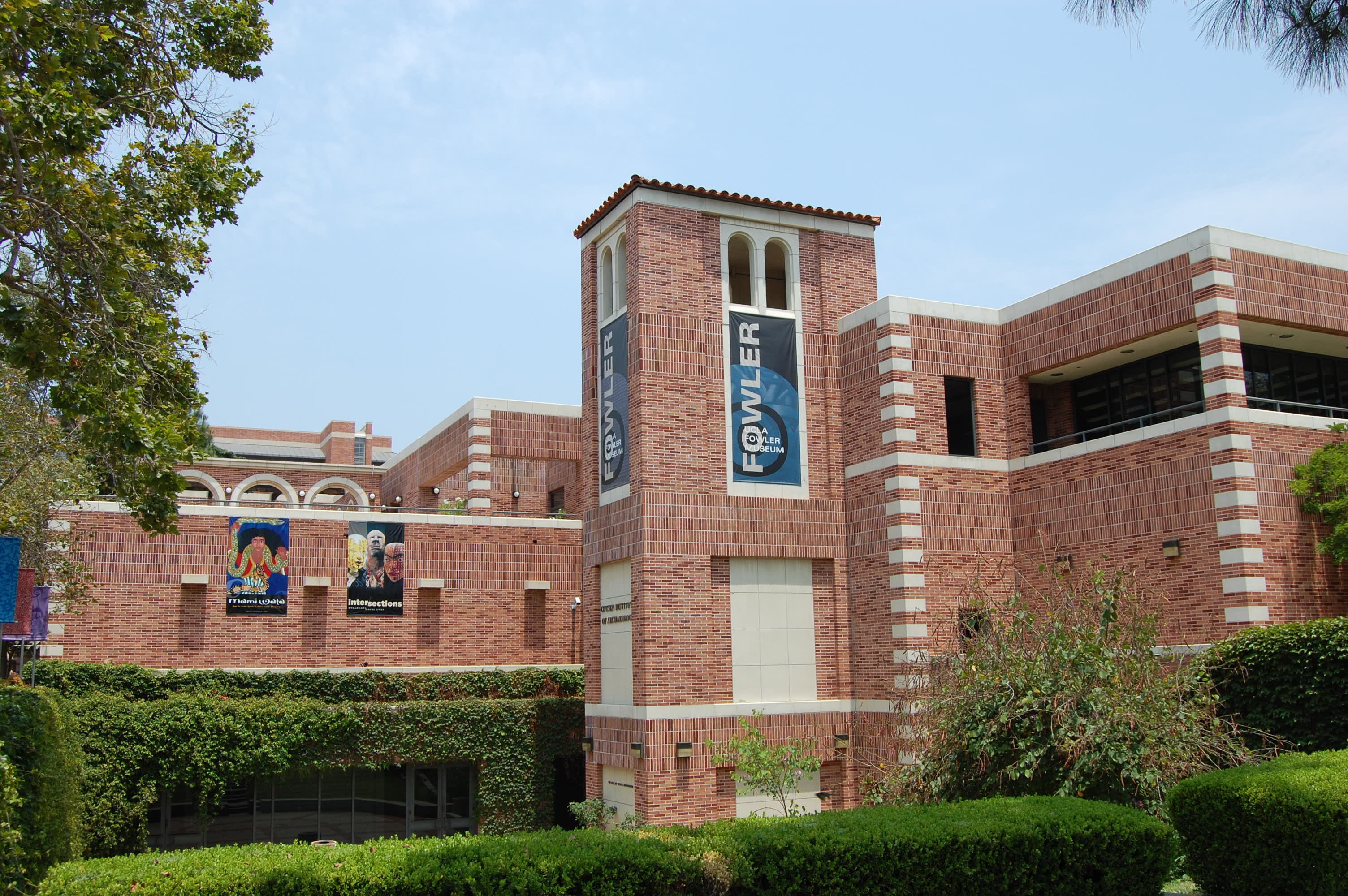
The Fowler Museum

Three public arts institutions, including a major performing arts program (CAP UCLA), are located within the School of the Arts and Architecture. These institutions offer access to leading anthropological, historical and contemporary visual arts exhibitions and collections, as well as presentations by performing artists.

- Hammer Museum
- Fowler Museum at UCLA
- UCLA Center for the Art of Performance (CAP UCLA)

== Notable faculty ==
Current notable Professors of Design Media Arts include Rebecca Allen, Erkki Huhtamo, Peter Lunenfeld, Christian Moeller, Casey Reas, Jennifer Steinkamp, Eddo Stern, and Victoria Vesna. Current Professors of Architecture include Neil Denari, Thom Mayne, Sylvia Lavin, and Greg Lynn. Other notable faculty include Distinguished Professor of world arts and cultures Peter Sellars, Professor of Photography Catherine Opie, Professor of Interdisciplinary Studio and Department of Art Chair Andrea Fraser, Distinguished Professor of New Genres Barbara Kruger, and Distinguished Professor of Painting Lari Pittman. Notable former faculty members include Mary Kelly, John Baldessari, Charles Ray, Chris Burden, Mike Kelley, Paul McCarthy, and Nancy Rubins.

== Notable alumni ==
- Full List

Notable alumni of the UCLA School of the Arts and Architecture include; Peter Alexander, Uta Barth, Karen Carson, Judy Chicago, Trisha Donnelly, Sharon Hayes, Katie Grinnan, Steve Hurd, Martin Kersels, Gina Lamb, Jason Rhoades, Betye Saar, Peter Shelton, Kevin Sullivan, Craig Kauffman, Amadour, Toba Khedoori, Elliott Hundley, Nikita Gale, and Wu Tsang.
