= UCF Center for Emerging Media =

Coordinates: 28°32′48″N 81°23′06″W

Center for Emerging Media
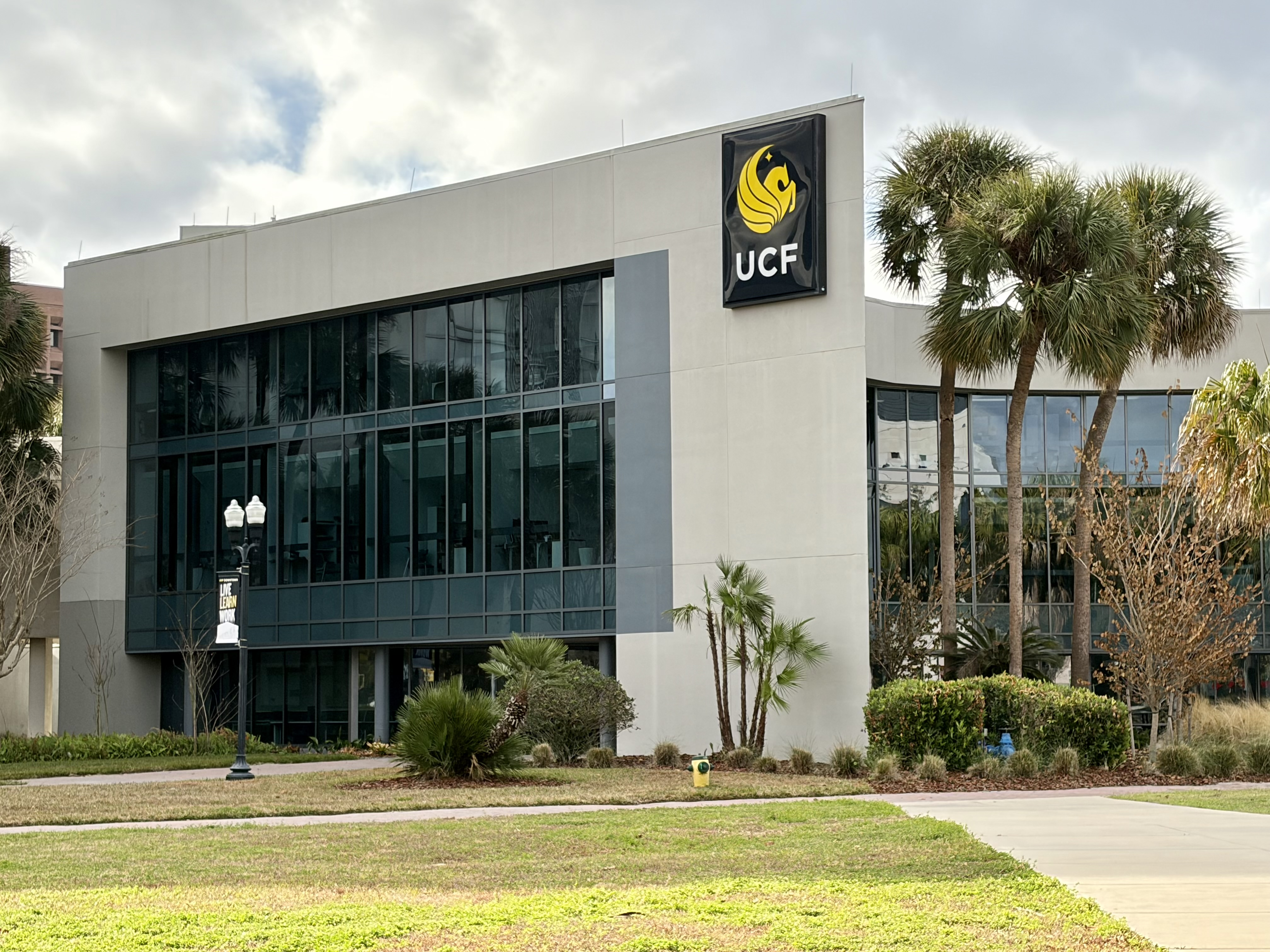
- The Center for Emerging Media at UCF's downtown Orlando campus
- Type: Public
- Established: 2008; 18 years ago
- Director: Ben Noel
- Location: Orlando, Florida, United States
- Website: Official Site

The University of Central Florida Center for Emerging Media (CEM) is located in downtown Orlando.

The Center supports many upper-level undergraduate and graduate programs in film, digital media, video game development, art and architecture.

The facility also features one of the largest motion-capture studios on the East Coast, an adjacent sound stage, production offices and editing suites. Collectively known as Studio 500—a play on the building’s 500 W. Livingston St. location—these production facilities have attracted a steady stream of entertainment companies from around the world and annually host about 10-15 UCF student film shoots.

== Departments ==
The Center for Emerging Media houses eight separate departments:

- Citi-Lab Orlando
- Center for Research in Education, Arts, Technology and Entertainment (CREATE)
- Florida Interactive Entertainment Academy (FIEA)
- Flying Horse Editions
- Studio 500
- UCF Film Department's MFA Production Wing
- Vicon House of Moves
- Visual Language

== See also ==
- University of Central Florida
- Florida Interactive Entertainment Academy
