= Dana Cuff =

American architect

Dana Cuff is an American architecture theorist, professor of architecture and urban design, and founding director of cityLAB at the University of California, Los Angeles (UCLA).

She received her Ph.D. in architecture from University of California, Berkeley and her B.A., psychology and design from University of California, Santa Cruz. She is the author of books including Fast Forward Urbanism (Princeton Architectural Press, 2011) and The Provisional City (MIT Press, 2000).

She has been awarded the 2004 Lise Meitner Endowed Chair at Lund University in Sweden and was the 2004–2006 Fellow of the Ziman Center for Real Estate at UCLA. In 2019, she also received the Women in Architecture Activist of the Year award and an international prize for Researcher of the Year.

== Publications ==
- Architecture: The Story of Practice, MIT Press, 1991. ISBN 978-0-262-03175-2
- The Provisional City: Los Angeles Stories of Architecture and Urbanism, MIT Press, 2000. ISBN 978-0-262-53202-0
- Fast Forward Urbanism with Roger Sherman, Princeton Architectural Press, 2011. ISBN 978-1-56898-977-8
- Urban Humanities: New Practices for Reimagining the City with Anastasia Loukaitou-Sideris, Todd Presner, Maite Zubiaurre, and Jonathan Jae-an Crisman, MIT Press, 2020. ISBN 9780262538220
- Architectures of Spatial Justice, MIT Press, 2023. ISBN 9780262545211
