= Kevin Daly Architects =

American architectural firm

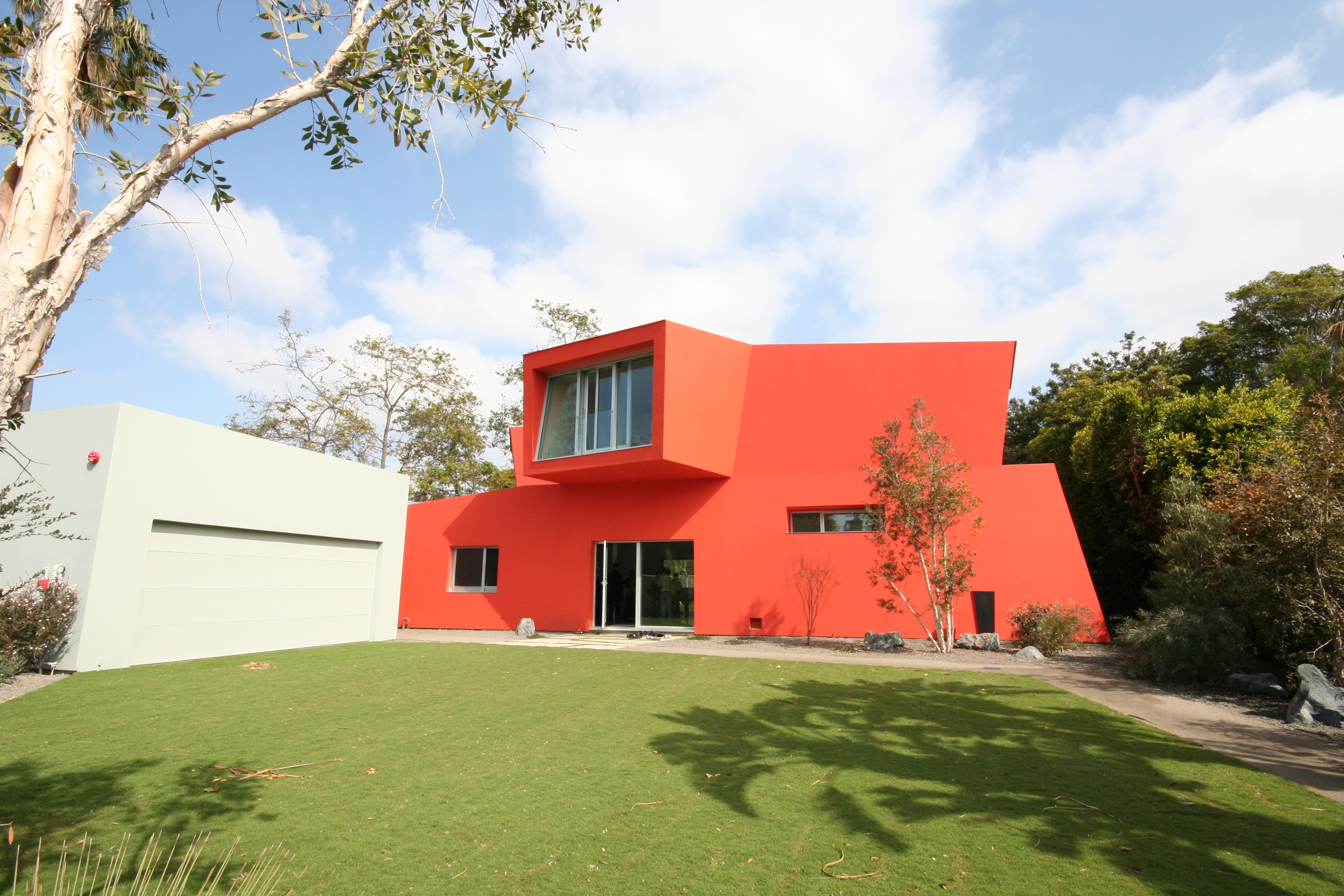
- Winnett House, Santa Monica, Calif.

Practice information
- Founded: 1990
- Location: Los Angeles, California, USA

Significant works and honors
- Buildings: Valley Center House, Venice/Palms House
- Projects: Broadway Affordable Housing, Camino Nuevo Charter Academy

Website
- http://kevindalyarchitects.com/

Kevin Daly Architects (KDA) is Kevin Daly's architecture firm in Los Angeles, California. It was founded in 1990 as Daly Genik. Daly has taught architecture and is a fellow at the American Institute of Architects (FAIA).

== Kevin Daly ==
Daly received his Bachelor of Architecture degree from the UC Berkeley College of Environmental Design and his Master of Architecture degree from the Rice University School of Architecture. Daly began his career a designer at Hodgetts + Fung and then an associate at Frank O. Gehry and Partners (1986–1989).

Daly was selected as one of eight "Emerging Voices" by the Architectural League of New York (1999) and held distinguished visiting chairs at both the Taubman College of Architecture and Urban Planning (2001) and Berkeley CED (2007–08). Daly currently teaches at UCLA and has taught at USC, SCI-Arc, Arizona State, and other architecture schools. He has lectured at Stanford, Cornell, Rice University and RISD.

Daly was selected a Fellow of the American Institute of Architects in 2012 and serves on AIA awards juries.

== Exhibitions and recognitions ==
KDA's work has been exhibited at the Museum of Contemporary Art, Los Angeles and the San Francisco Museum of Modern Art (SFMOMA), shown most recently in "A New Sculpturalism: Contemporary Architecture from Southern California" (2013). The SFMOMA acquired original drawings and models of one of the firm's earliest projects, The Topanga Canyon House, for their permanent collection. KDA was on the cover of Metropolis in 1999 and was featured in All American: Innovation in American Architecture in 2001. In 2005 the firm was selected as one of five American architectural practices to be included in Phaidon's 10x10_2, a book featuring 100 of the world's most exceptional architects to have emerged internationally over the past five years. Their work has been noted in the New York Times, Dwell, Architectural Record, the Los Angeles Times, The Architectural Review, A+U, Domus, Azure, and others.

== Work ==
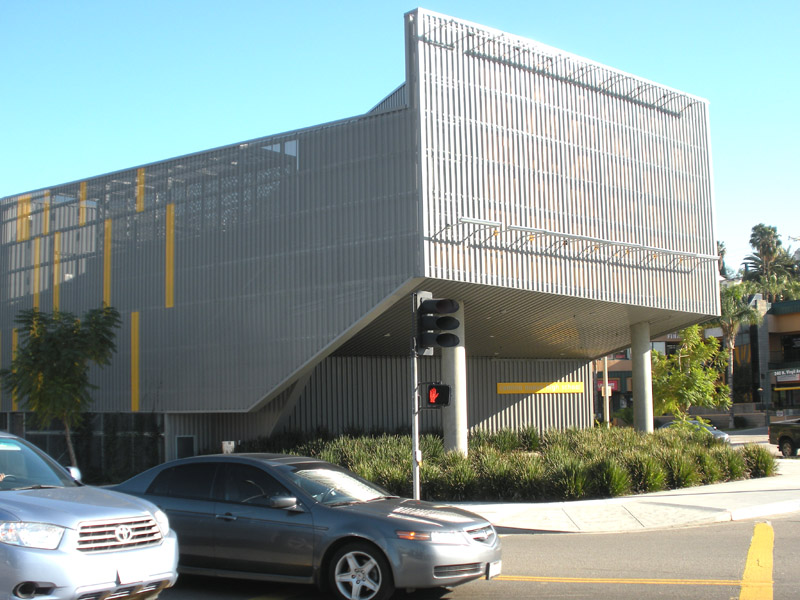
Camino Nuevo High School

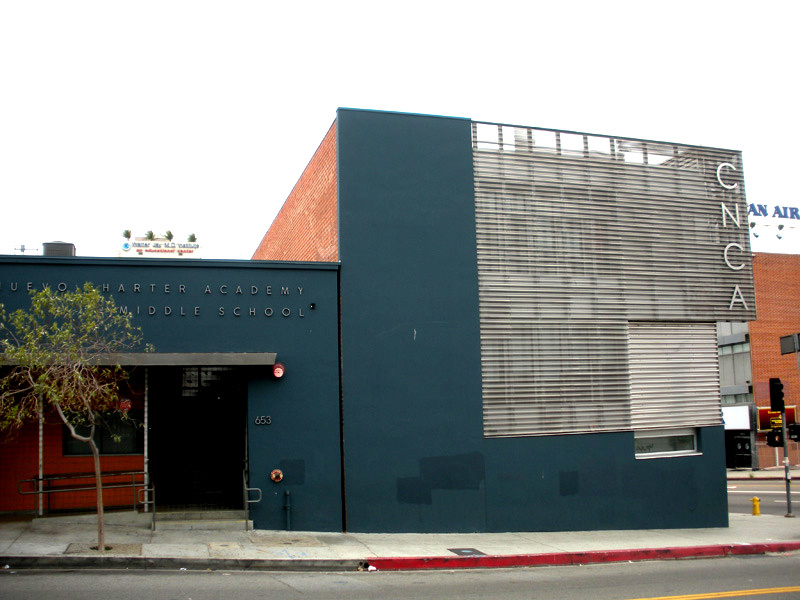
Camino Nuevo Middle School

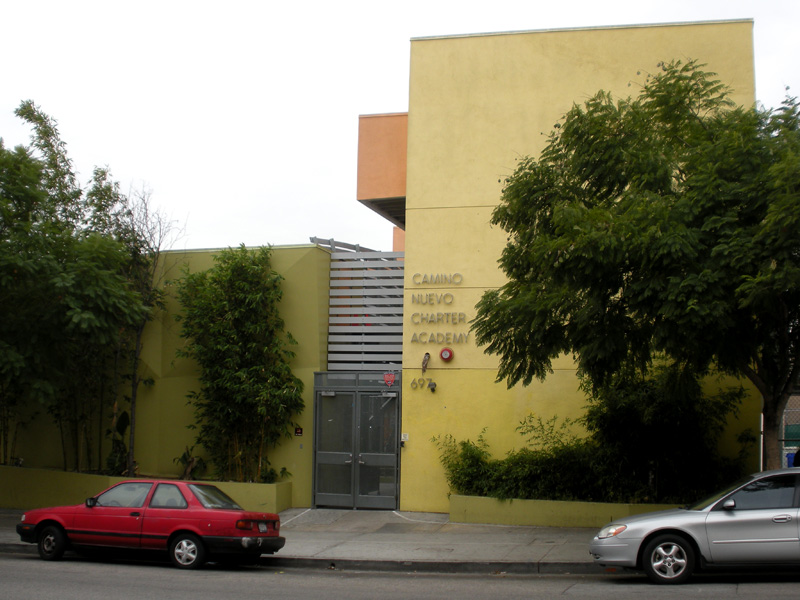
Camino Nuevo ECC

KDA has designed educational, residential and institutional buildings. The firm designed the Camino Nuevo Charter Academy Schools project— a series of five projects designed over the course of a decade. Architecture critic, Nicolai Ouroussoff, called KDA's the school's design as "one of the most inspiring projects built in Los Angeles in years" and as "a thoughtful, low-cost work of architecture that embodies the kind of civic purpose and progressive ideals that so many public institutions give lip service to but rarely fulfill".

The AIA described Daly's architecture as a combination of "innovation in technology and fabrication, economy and livability, materiality and form" as executed in the characteristics of an affordable housing apartment complex at 2602 Broadway in Santa Monica (2013). The project uses high-performance, sustainable materials and design elements that offer private, interior spaces for residents along with a "community zone" that maximizes every corner of the 1.5-acre site. Transforming infill properties, like 2602 Broadway, into buildings that become community landmarks, is characteristic of the firm's public work.

According to Daly, architecture can be "performative on every level: environmentally, structurally, economically, and aesthetically".

The Valley Center House and the Palms Residence are examples of the firm's residential work Daly's practice includes pro bono work; most recently he designed UCLA Medical Center Santa Monica's new Stuart House, a program of the Rape Treatment Center, and was on the advisory board of USC's Center for Sustainable Cities. In 2009, Ouroussoff said that Daly belongs to the younger generation of architects contributing to the country's westward shift from New York to Los Angeles as the center for innovation and creativity in architectural thought (along with established architects Frank Gehry, Thom Mayne, Eric Owen Moss, Robert Mangurian and Craig Hodgetts). KDA projects in process include expansion of the UCLA Ostin Music Center and the new Edison Language Academy for the Santa Monica-Malibu Unified School District.

== Project list ==
- UCLA Mo Ostin Basketball Center, Los Angeles, Calif. (2017) – new basketball practice facility for the men's and women's teams
- BIHOME, Los Angeles, Calif. (2015) – affordable architectural models for infilling Southern California's single-family residential fabric
- UCSB San Joaquin Housing, Santa Barbara, Calif. (2016) – 50,000 sf low rise student apartments and social space.
- UCLA Ostin Music Center, Los Angeles, Calif. (2012) – 30,000 sf recording studio, practice and teaching facilities on the UCLA campus.
- Edison Language Academy, Santa Monica, Calif. (2014) – New 35,000 sf K–5 Spanish/English dual language school. Sustainability practices include solar thermal ventilation for classrooms and an extensive storm water storage cistern.
- Galisteo House, Santa Fe, NM (2014) – Studio for a photographer.
- Broadway Affordable Housing, Santa Monica, Calif. (2013) – A 33 unit affordable housing project arranged around a courtyard.
- Stuart House, Santa Monica, Calif. (2013) – Concept design for a new one stop wellness center.
- Dulwich College, Saadiyat Island, United Arab of Emirates (2010) – Master plan for an expansion campus of the historic UK college to be located on Saadiyat Island, Abu Dhabi.
- Harvard Art Museum, Allston, Mass. (2010) – Planning and concept design for a new 100,000 sf museum on the Harvard University campus.
- Venice/Palms Residence, Venice (2010) – Perforated metal screens surround a single family residence, garden and guest apartment in Venice.
- Harvard College Library Media Center, Cambridge, Mass. (2010) – Archive and media conversion workspace is located in the James Stirling designed Sackler Museum on the Harvard University campus.
- W Hotel & Residences, Hollywood, Calif. (2009) – Interior design, planning, and layout of the residences and sales studio.
- Tahiti Housing, Santa Monica, Calif. (2009) – A 33-unit affordable housing for families in Santa Monica.
- This Side of Paradise, The Huntington Library, San Marino, Calif. )2008) – Design and fabrication for an international exhibition of Los Angeles photography.
- Art Center College of Design Housing Complex, Pasadena, Calif. (2007) – Proposal for 240 student housing micro-lofts and live/work units.
- Camino Nuevo Charter Academy Early Learning Center, Los Angeles, Calif. (2007) – Renovation of a warehouse facilities to create classroom and outdoor play areas for a 50 student preschool facility and after school dance program.
- 100 Rooms/5000 Cells, SCI-Arc, Los Angeles, Calif. (2007) – Honeycomb cardboard packing material was machined and then expanded to form a labyrinth in the SCI-Arc gallery.
- Artist's Studio, Los Angeles, Calif. (2007) – Upper level clerestory glazing provides natural light and ventilation for an artist's studio on a steep hillside overlooking Silver Lake.
- BMW DesignworksUSA, Newbury Park, Calif. (2007) – An open, collaborative work space for an industrial design studio.
- Winnett House, Los Angeles, Calif. (2007) – Custom private residence.
- Studio for a Painter, Los Angeles, Calif. (2006) – A double height painting studio completes a compound of live/work buildings for a noted Los Angeles painter.
- Lawrence House, Hermosa Beach, Calif. (2006) – Renovation of the Morphosis-designed Lawrence House.
- 34th Street Guest House, Hermosa Beach, Calif. (unbuilt) – A guest and entertainment pavilion above a lap pool, adjacent to the Morphosis-designed Lawrence House.
- Camino Nuevo Charter Academy High School, Los Angeles, Calif. (2006) – National AIA Award winning design for a 30,000 sf high school campus on a linear, island site.
- Santa Monica Parks, Santa Monica, Calif. (2005)
- Art Center College of Design South Campus, Pasadena, Calif. (2004) – Renovation of a 100,000 sf World War II-era wind tunnel structure for use as the South Campus of Art Center College of Design.
- Camino Nuevo Charter Academy Middle School, Los Angeles, Calif. (2003) – Phased renovation combining a warehouse and a boulevard office building for use as a 12 classroom middle school.
- Beverley House, Santa Monica, Calif. (2001) – A renovated bungalow was turned into a terraced hillside house in the Ocean Park district of Santa Monica.
- Camino Nuevo Charter Academy Elementary, Los Angeles, Calif. (2000) – 12,000 sf conversion of an abandoned mini-mall retail center for use as a 12 classroom elementary school.
- ASU Campus Cafes, Tempe, AZ (1999) – Planning and concept design for series of cafes on the ASU campus.
- Pico & Main, Santa Monica, Calif. (1999) – Renovation of an office building.
- Slot Box House, Santa Monica, Calif. (1999) – Custom residence for a family.
- Valley Center House, Valley Center, Calif. (1998) – A 2800 sf house on a citrus ranch employing a range of fire-resistant building strategies.
- Mar Vista House, Los Angeles, Calif. (1998) – A translucent cube housing a library and textile gallery is added to an historic Gregory Ain house.
- Topanga House, Topanga Canyon, Calif. (unbuilt) – Fire-resistant design of a house in a rural canyon setting.

== Awards ==
- Rudy Bruner Award for Urban Excellence Gold Medal — Camino Nuevo Charter Academy (2003)
- AIA National Awards
  - Housing Award — Broadway Housing
  - CAE Educational Facility Design Award — Camino Nuevo High School (2009)
  - Honor Award — Camino Nuevo High School (2010)
- American Architecture Award — Venice House (2011)
- AIA Arizona — ASU Campus Cafes (1998)
- AIA California Council Awards
  - Design Award — Camino Nuevo Charter Academy (2007)
  - Design Award — Art Center College of Design South Campus (2006)
  - Honor Award — Broadway Affordable Housing (2013)
  - Honor Award — Camino Nuevo High School (2009)
  - Honor Award — Valley Center House (2003)
  - Merit Award — Tahiti Affordable Housing (2012)
  - Merit Award — Palms/Venice House (2010)
  - Merit Award — Camino Nuevo Charter Academy (2004)
- AIA Los Angeles Awards
  - Firm of the Year Award — Daly Genik (2009)
  - Design Award — Broadway Affordable Housing (2013)
  - Design Award — Palms/Venice House (2011)
  - Design Award — Tahiti Housing (2011)
  - Design Award — Art Center College of Design South Campus (2008)
  - Design Award — Camino Nuevo High School (2008)
  - Honor Award — Camino Nuevo Charter Academy (2000)
  - Honor Award — Valley Center House (1999)
  - Honor Award — Mar Vista Residence (1997)
  - Interiors Award — Rioport.com Offices (2000)
  - Interiors Award — Windmill Lane Productions (1998)
  - Merit Award — Horses in the Hood (2000)
  - Next LA Award — Harvard University Art Museum (2008)
  - Next LA Award — Art Center College of Design Housing Complex (2008)
  - Next LA Award — Palms/Venice House (2007)
  - Next LA Award — Camino Nuevo High School (2006)
  - Presidential Nominee — City Rebuilder Award — W Hotel & Residences (2010)
  - Presidential Nominee — City Rebuilder Award – Art Center College of Design (2005)
- AIA Pasadena & Foothill Sustainability Award — Art Center College of Design South Campus (2004)
- AIA Pasadena & Foothill Honor Award — Art Center College of Design South Campus (2004)
- Boston Society of Architects Honor Award for Interior Architecture/Interior Design — Harvard College Library (2010)
- Global Green Millennium Award —W Hotel & Residences, Hollywood (2010)
- Social Impact Design Award Citation — Broadway Affordable Housing (2013)
- Zerofootprint Reskinning Awards — Palms/Venice House (2011)

== Bibliography ==
- Adria, Miguel et al. "Daly Genik Architects, Santa Monica, USA". In 10x10_2, 81–3. London: Phaidon Press, 2005.
- Amelar, Sarah (March 2013). "Block party: Santa Monica, Calif., 2602 Broadway, Daly Genik Architects". Architectural Record. Vol. 201, no. 3. pp. 98–100. ProQuest 1370834171.
- Anderton, Frances; Koshalek, Richard (June 2007). "Richard Koshalek". Dwell. Vol. 7, no. 7. pp. 121–122, 124. ProQuest 55453424.
- Anderton, Frances (October 21, 1999). "CURRENTS: ARCHITECTURE; Minimalism Still Finds Shelter in the West". The New York Times.
- Anderton, Frances (July 18, 2002). "CURRENTS: CALIFORNIA | ARCHITECTURE; A Showcase for Contemporary California Design". The New York Times.
- Anderton, Frances (October 26, 2000). "CURRENTS: LOS ANGELES -- MINI-MALLS; Replacing Shoppers With Students". The New York Times.
- Betsky, Aaron (March 1995). "Ristrutturazione di una villa a Tazana, California" [Renovation of a house at Tazana, California]. Domus (in Italian). No. 769. pp. 36–39. ProQuest 55213167.
- Betsky, Aaron (November 5, 1995). "STYLE / INTERIORS : REDO FOR TWO : Architects Daly, Genik Help a Tarzana Couple Feather Their Empty Nest". Los Angeles Times.
- Burnett-Stuart, Jack (March 5, 2010). "Lernen in L.A.". Bauwelt. Vol. 101, no. 10. pp. 26–29. ProQuest 816374043.
- Chang, Jade (August 1, 2003). "Getting Centered". Metropolis.
- Chavez, Annette. "Commercial Carrier". Westside Weekly (July 11, 1997): 1, 9.
- Cheek, Lawrence W (July 1999). "Shades of meaning: a hillside California house by Daly, Genik combines tough materials with refined climate controls". Architecture. Vol. 88, no. 7. pp. 78–83. ProQuest 55243302.
- Collner, Adam Leith (September 2005). "A new light: Santa Monica firm Daly Genik Architects helps a young Los Angeles artist realize her dream studio". Azure. Vol. 21, no. 162. pp. 98–100. ProQuest 55411639.
- Daly, Kevin; Genik, Chris (2002). "Daly, Genik Architects: Camino Nuevo Charter Academy Elementary School, Los Angeles, California, USA". Ume. No. 14. pp. 6–13. ProQuest 55280088.
- —. October 11, 2006. "Kevin Daly and Chris Genik". In SCI-Arc Media Archive. Southern California Institute of Architecture. http://sma.sciarc.edu/video/kevin-daly-and-chris-genik/.
- Derringer, Jaime. "Palms House by Daly Genik Architects". Design Milk, July 20, 2011. http://design-milk.com/palms-house-by-daly-genik-architects/
- "Topanga Canyon House". Progressive Architecture. Vol. 73, no. 1. January 1992. pp. 72–73. ProQuest 55097494.
- Fruchtman, Brooke. "Art Center Revamps". ID (October 2002): 20.
- Giovannini, Joseph (February 2005). "Daly Genik turns an aircraft-testing wind tunnel into a dynamic structure, inaugurating ART CENTER COLLEGE OF DESIGN's new campus". Architectural Record. Vol. 193, no. 2. pp. 112–115. ProQuest 55444922.
- Giovannini, Joseph (October 30, 2003). "Fighting Fire With Steel, Pools And Plaster". The New York Times.
- Goldin, Greg. "School Reform". Los Angeles Magazine, April 1, 2010. http://www.lamag.com/Story.aspx?ID=1389898
- Gonchar, Joann (July 2007). "K-12 schools: making the grade". Architectural Record. Vol. 195, no. 7. p. 129. ProQuest 55455393.
- Goodwin, Andrew. "Daly Genik's Tahiti Housing Complex in Santa Monica Redefines Sustainable Low-Income Housing". Inhabitat, August 20, 2012. http://inhabitat.com/daly-geniks-tahitit-housing-complex-in-santa-monica-redefines-sustainable-low-income-housing/
- Gregory, Rob; Slessor, Catherine (May 2008). "Housing: an often neglected area of architectural activity, mass housing needs new approaches". Architectural Review. Vol. 223, no. 1335. pp. 60–67. ProQuest 55490023.
- Gregory, Rob (January 2007). "Daly Genik: school, Silver Lake, Los Angeles, USA". Architectural Review. Vol. 221, no. 1319. p. 64. ProQuest 55443687.
- Griff, Adam (October 1999). "Emerging voices at the Architectural League". Oculus. Vol. 62, no. 2. pp. 15–16. ProQuest 55251315.
- Haar, Sharon, ed. (2002). "Camino Nuevo Middle School, Los Angeles, Daley sic Genik Architects". Schools for Cities: Urban Strategies. Princeton Architectural Press. pp. 90–91. ISBN 978-1-56898-378-3.
- Hall, Emily (January 2003). "The rough edge of the world". Dwell. Vol. 3, no. 3. pp. 76–83. ProQuest 55290926.
- Hawthorne, Christopher. "Pass/fail for L.A.'s new arts school". Los Angeles Times, May 31, 2009. http://www.latimes.com/entertainment/news/arts/la-ca-art-school31-2009may31,0,4081776.story#axzz2rif73Yfa
- —. "Teaching an Old Design College New Tricks". The New York Times, March 18, 2004. https://www.nytimes.com/2004/03/18/garden/teaching-an-old-design-college-new-tricks.html
- —. "The W Hollywood Hotel & Residences: An urban complexity". Los Angeles Times, January 29, 2010. https://www.latimes.com/archives/la-xpm-2010-jan-29-la-et-w-hotel29-2010jan29-story.html
- Hay, David (May 2000). "A new direction in Tinseltown: L.A. rebuilds from within". Architectural Record. Vol. 188, no. 5. pp. 69–72. ProQuest 55746772.
- Heeger, Susan. "Tiny Plot, Grand Plan". Los Angeles Times, April 20, 1997. https://www.latimes.com/archives/la-xpm-1997-04-20-tm-50444-story.html
- Hines, Thomas (April 2002). "Daly, Genik Architects deftly reincarnates a SANTA MONICA bungalow". Architectural Record. Vol. 190, no. 4. pp. 128–131. ProQuest 55275598.
- Ho, Cathy Lang, and Raul A. Barreneche. "Revolution: Daly, Genik, Valley Center House". In House: American houses for the new century, 148–159. New York: Universe Publishing, 2001.
- Iovine, Julie V. (March 11, 1999). "ARCHITECTURE FOR A NEW CENTURY; Fierce Poetry From Young Turks". The New York Times.
- Jackson, Neil (November 1997). "Remodelling Mar Vista". The Architectural Review. Vol. 202, no. 1209. pp. 72–75. ProQuest 55255773.
- Jaffe, Matthew. "Old meets new in Pasadena". Sunset (January 2005). http://www.sunset.com/travel/california/old-meets-new-in-pasadena-00400000012353/
- Jodidio, Philiip, ed. "Valley Center House". In Architecture Now, 158–61. Köln: Taschen, 2001.
- Jones, Miranda. "A fire-safe home remodel". Sunset (September 2010). http://www.sunset.com/home/architecture-design/fire-safe-house-00418000069237/
- Kimm, Alice; Merkel, Jayne (July 2004). "Camino Nuevo Academy, Los Angeles". Architectural Record. Vol. 192, no. 7. pp. 42–46. ProQuest 55409358.
- Kimm, Alice (February 2001). "Camino Nuevo Academy, Los Angeles". Architectural Record. Vol. 189, no. 2. pp. 134–137. ProQuest 54916479.
- Kleilein, Doris. "Tahiti Housing: Die Wohnanlage Von Daly Genik Architects in Santa Monica California, USA". Bauwelt 101, no. 10 (March 5, 2009): 14–17, http://www.bauwelt.de/cms/bauwerk.html?id=1209065#.Uu-W3nddXd0 (accessed February 2, 2014).
- Knight, Christopher. "'This Side of Paradise' at the Huntington Library, Art Collections and Botanical Gardens". Los Angeles Times, June 18, 2008. http://www.latimes.com/entertainment/news/arts/la-et-paradise18-2008jun18,0,7824256.story#axzz2rif73Yfa
- Lamprecht, Barbara (November 1997). "The new restraint". The Architectural Review. Vol. 202, no. 1209. pp. 11–12. ProQuest 55191404.
- LeBlanc, Sydney. "Generations; A Vacation House Transforms Itself and a Family". The New York Times, August 24, 2000. https://www.nytimes.com/2000/08/24/garden/generations-a-vacation-house-transforms-itself-and-a-family.html
- Lubell, Sam (July 2007). "ONE: CAMINO NUEVO HIGH SCHOOL Los Angeles, California: Daly Genik transforms an awkward and almost unusable site in a gritty section of the city into a dynamic environment for learning". Architectural Record. Vol. 195, no. 7. pp. 130–135. ProQuest 55437698.
- Maguire, Denise. "Schoolyard/backyard". Plan (October 2007): 23.
- Makovsky, Paul; Pedersen, Martin C.; Cameron, Kristi; Greenberg, Randi (February 2009). "Open-Ended Learning". Metropolis. Vol. 28, no. 7. p. 80. Archived from the original on February 19, 2009.
- McGuigan, Cathleen (November 26, 2000). "Designing Smarter Schools". Newsweek.
- Newman, Morris; Lamprecht, Barbara Mac (November 1993). "Disquieting dwellings: structural interventions dominate two residential remodels by Daly, Genik". Progressive Architecture. Vol. 74, no. 11. pp. 66–69. ProQuest 55120585.
- Ngo, Dung, editor and Adi Shamir Zion. "Valley Center House". In Open house: unbound space and the modern dwelling, 174–181. New York: Rizzoli, 2002.
- O'Brien, Edna. "The Most Beautiful Fireplaces in the World". Elle Décor (October/November 1994): 220–8.
- Ouroussoff, Nicolai (February 23, 2010). "A New Fort, er, Embassy, for London". The New York Times.
- —. "A raw kind of beauty". Los Angeles Times, June 21, 2004. https://www.latimes.com/archives/la-xpm-2004-jun-21-et-ouroussoff21-story.html
- —. "Architects on the Verge". Elle Décor (October–November 1995): 260–1.
- Ouroussoff, Nicolai (August 23, 2009). "As Heroes Disappear, the City Needs More". The New York Times.
- —. "Campus as canvas". Los Angeles Times, March 30, 2004. https://www.latimes.com/archives/la-xpm-2003-mar-30-ca-ouroussoff30-story.html
- —. "Civic Triumphs, Great and Small". Los Angeles Times, December 24, 2000. https://www.latimes.com/archives/la-xpm-2000-dec-24-ca-4060-story.html
- —. "Pushing the limits of school design". Los Angeles Times, February 17, 2003. https://www.latimes.com/archives/la-xpm-2003-feb-17-et-ouroussoff17-story.html
- —. "Two Schools of Thought". Los Angeles Times, November 1, 2000. https://www.latimes.com/archives/la-xpm-2000-nov-01-ca-45024-story.html
- Paul, Linda Leigh. "House on the Rocks". In Coastal Retreats: The Pacific Northwest and the Architecture of Adventure, 67–71. New York: Universe Publishing, 2002.
- Pavarini, Stefano (September 1997). "Come si può lavorare" [How can it work]. Arca (in Italian). No. 118. pp. 68–73. ProQuest 55644893.
- Polazzi, Giovanni, ed. "Casa Boulder". In Case nel Mondo, 96–107. Milano: Federico Motta Editore, 2003.
- Ray, Mary-Ann, Roger Sherman and Mirko Zardini, eds. "Daly+Genik: Nel giardino/In the Garden". In Lotus Quarderni Documents 22; The Dense-city: After the Sprawl, 56–7. Publication: Elemond, 1999.
- Richardson, Phyllis. "Movers and Shapers". Telegraph Magazine (July 23, 2005): 49–53.
- Saporito, Bill. "Inside the New American Home". Time, October 14, 2002. http://content.time.com/time/magazine/article/0,9171,1003432,00.html
- Sirefman, Susanna. "Valley Center House". In The Contemporary Guesthouse, 128–35. New York, Edizioni Press, 2004.
- Slessor, Catherine (November 2002). "El buen camino: school, Los Angeles, USA". Architectural Review. Vol. 212, no. 1269. pp. 44–48. ProQuest 55291074.
- Slessor, Catherine (July 2000). "Folding pattern: house, San Diego County, USA". Architectural Review. Vol. 208, no. 1241. pp. 56–59. ProQuest 55742130.
- Speaks, Michael, Christopher Genik, Kevin Daly, Tom Buresh, and Danelle Guthrie.
- Speaks, Michael (December 1999). "Daly Genik: Slot Box House, Santa Monica, California". Domus. No. 821. pp. 38–437. ProQuest 55754441.
- Viladas, Pilar (November 7, 2009). "Family Planning". The New York Times.
- Viladas, Pilar (July 1, 2007). "Meta-Morphosis". The New York Times.
- Walker, Alissa. "Protest in Pasadena". The Architect's Newspaper, June 2008. http://archpaper.com/news/articles.asp?id=1823
- —. "Team Hollywood". The Architect's Newspaper, January 28, 2010. http://archpaper.com/news/articles.asp?id=4197
- Webb, Michael (June 1997). "Windmill Lane Productions, Santa Monica, California". Interiors. Vol. 156, no. 6. pp. 82–87. ProQuest 55199750.
- Webb, Michael (August 2005). "Art in action: art centre, Pasadena, California, USA". Architectural Review. Vol. 218, no. 1302. pp. 62–67. ProQuest 55398005.
- Wheeler, Bradley (October 2007). "The Winds of Change". Architektur.aktuell. No. 331. pp. 62–73.
- —. "The Winds of Change". OFARCH (May/July 2008): 102–117.
- Young, Emily (November 2007). "Back to the Future" (PDF). Azure. Vol. 23, no. 180. pp. 62–67. ProQuest 55494433. Archived from the original (PDF) on March 10, 2014.
- Kimm, Alice (April 2006). "Camino Nuevo Middle School, Los Angeles, California". Architectural Record. Vol. 194, no. 4. pp. 34–36. ProQuest 55470119.
- Kimm, Alice (March 2003). "Camino Nuevo Middle School, Los Angeles, California". Architectural Record. Vol. 191, no. 3. pp. 144–146. ProQuest 55292077.
- "College in Santa Monica, California, U.S.A.". Architektur + Wettbewerbe. No. 156. December 1993. p. 29. ProQuest 55146824.
- "Daly Genik Architects: Art Center College of Design, South Campus, Pasadina [sic], California, USA 2004". A+U: Architecture and Urbanism. No. 8455. August 2008. pp. 118–121. ProQuest 55443598.
- "Daly Genik Architects: Palms House, Los Angeles, California, USA 2010". A+U: Architecture and Urbanism. No. 499. April 2012. pp. 122–125. ProQuest 1020955008.
- "Daly-Genik Architects: casa en Valley Center" [House in Valley Center]. Quaderns d'Arquitectura I Urbanisme (in Italian). No. 225. 2000. pp. 70–75. ProQuest 55734062.
- Speaks, Michael; Genik, Christopher; Daly, Kevin; Buresh, Tom; Guthrie, Danelle (June 1999). "Leaving home". Metropolis. Vol. 18, no. 9. pp. 86–95, 131, 133. ProQuest 55250218.
- "1998 Design Awards". LA Architect (December 1998): 22.
- "Beverly House". Sunset (August 2004).
- "Camino Nuevo High School". Il Giornale dell'Architettura 56 (November 2007).
- "Cool geblieben, Wohnhaus in Kalifornien". DBZ: Metall 6 (2002): 72.
- "Daly Genik Architects: ACCD South Campus". Designboom, July 11, 2011. http://www.designboom.com/architecture/daly-genik-architects-accd-south-campus/
- "Daly Genik Architects: Palms House". Designboom, July 7, 2011. http://www.designboom.com/architecture/daly-genik-architects-palms-house/
- "Details: Grand Ouvrants". Le Moniteur Architecture. No. 114. March 2001. pp. 94–97.
- "Focus-On". Art On Paper (December 2008).
- "Harvard College Library". Architectural Record Issue Number (November 2010).
- "Holiday Home in California". Detail Das Architekturportal (November 2004): 1289–90, http://www.detail-online.com/inspiration/holiday-home-in-california-103664.html
- "Kevin Daly & Chris Genik". SCI-Arc, From the Center. SCI-Arc Press (Winter 1997).
- "Movers and Shapers". Telegraph Magazine, July 23, 2005.
- "Open Door Policy". Los Angeles Times Magazine (1999).
- "Park Place". Los Angeles Magazine (January 2004).
- "Studio Blockbusters". Los Angeles Magazine (February 2007).
- "Tahiti Housing". Architectural Record (2010), http://archrecord.construction.com/projects/bts/archives/multifamhousing/10_Tahihi_Affordable_Housing/
- "Venice House by Daly Genik". Domusweb, August 16, 2011, http://www.domusweb.it/en/news/2011/08/16/venice-house-by-daly-genik.html (accessed January 30, 2014).
- "Works in Progress, 7 California Architects Re-Imagine". LA Weekly (July 18–24, 1997): 57.
