= Philip Lance =

American priects, psychologist, activist (born 1959)

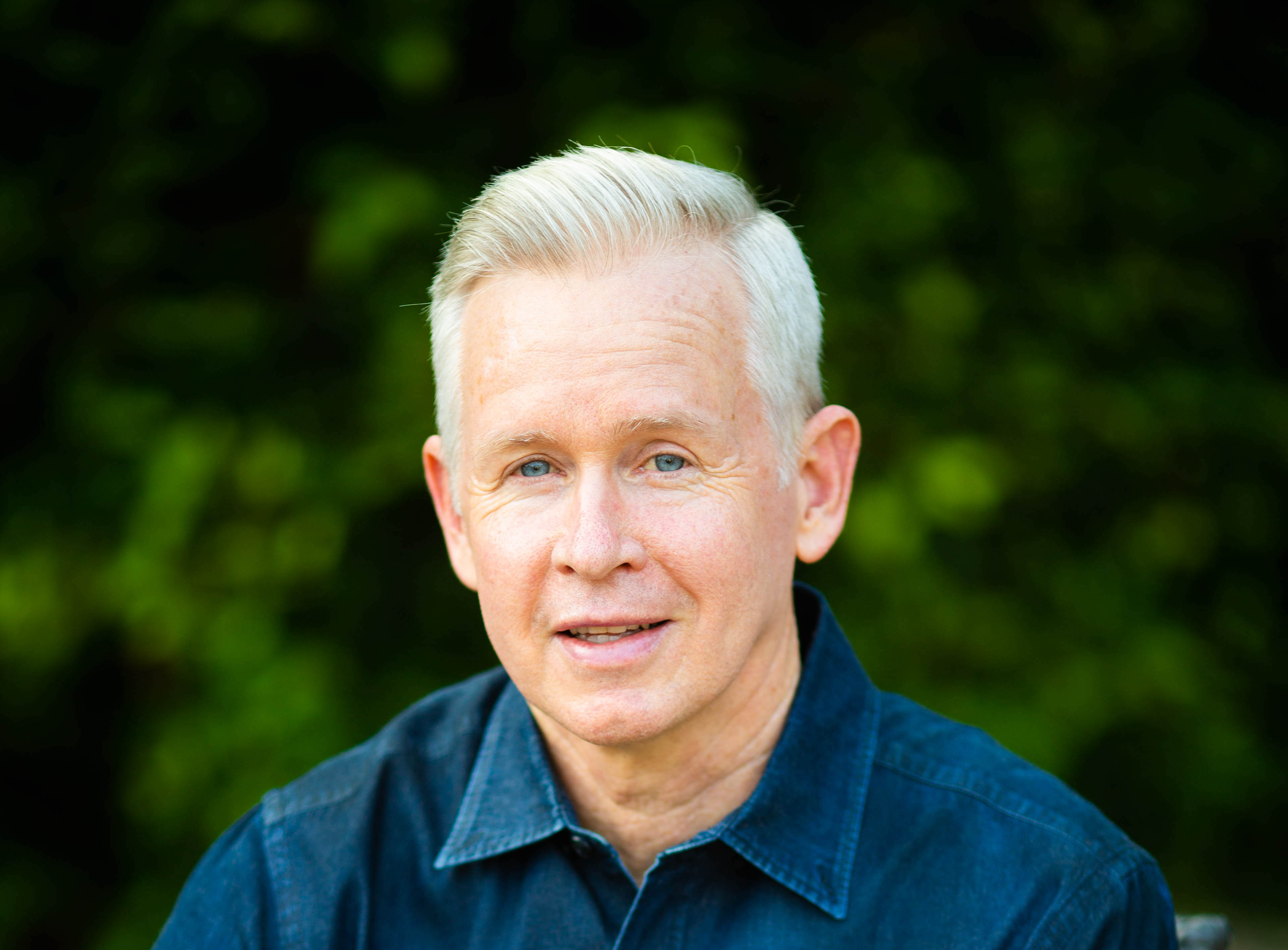
- Born: Redlands, California
- Education: Pacifica Graduate Institute, The General Theological Seminary NYC, Wheaton College
- Occupation: Psychoanalyst
- Known for: One of the first male priests ordained by the Episcopal Church whose homosexuality was openly acknowledged by the ordaining diocese prior to his ordination
- Church: The Episcopal Church
- Ordained: January 16, 1988
- Congregations served: Cathedral Center of St. Paul, Los Angeles; All Saints, Beverly Hills
- Website: www.psychologytoday.com/profile/228002

Philip Lance (born 1959) is an American psychoanalyst and former community organizer who began his career as an Episcopalian priest. He was one of the first persons ordained by the Episcopal Church whose homosexuality was openly acknowledged by the ordaining diocese prior to his ordination. He is the founder of Pueblo Nuevo Development, now known as Pueblo Nuevo Education & Development Group (PNEDG), and founder of the Camino Nuevo Charter Academy (CNCA) schools. Together with Douglas Sadownick, he is the co-founder of Colors LGBTQ Youth Counseling Services. He is a Fellow of the International Psychoanalytic Association and a member of The Psychoanalytic Center of California.

== Education ==
Philip Lance attended Wheaton College for his B.A. and the General Theological Seminary for his graduate work in Theology. He received his Ph.D. from Pacifica Graduate Institute in Clinical Psychology in 2013. His dissertation was entitled "Toward a Gay Centered Liberation Psychology".

== Early career ==
Lance was ordained on January 16, 1988 at the Parish Church of St. Athanasius & St. Paul in the Episcopal Diocese of Los Angeles. Lance was openly gay and his ordination was the subject of considerable discord and controversy among the members of the Commission on Ministry. Ultimately, the Episcopal Church gave their approval for Lance to receive the sacrament of holy orders. The ordination was presided by Bishop Oliver Bailey Garver Jr. Lance's life partner Joel Ginsberg Harrison (d. 1993) was one of the three formal “presenters” during the ordination ceremony. A second presenter was J. Jon Bruno who was later elected the sixth bishop of the Episcopal Diocese.

From 1987 to 1991, Lance served as the Curate at St. Athanasius Church where he introduced Spanish language services and established a congregation of Latino residents of Echo Park. During these years he also served as the Bishop's Liaison for Peace & Justice Ministry in the Diocese. He became active as a clergy leader for the Justice for Janitors campaign, a social movement organization that fights for the rights of janitors (caretakers and cleaners) across the US and Canada.

== Community development work ==
In 1992, Lance organized a weekly "mass in the grass” in MacArthur Park for undocumented Latino immigrants. This event was an outgrowth of his involvement with the Justice for Janitors campaign, a social movement organization that fights for the rights of janitors. The "mass in the grass" led to the formation of a series of community based entrepreneurial projects including a worker-owned janitorial company. In 1994, The Archbishop of Canterbury visited Pueblo Nuevo and learned that Lance was a gay man causing discussion by the media.

In 1999, Lance and his Pueblo Nuevo congregation founded Camino Nuevo Charter Academy with the help of educator Paul Cummins, founder of the Crossroads School. During his tenure as leader of the organization, the schools grew to serve more than 3200 students with an annual operating budget exceeding $50 million and real estate assets of $100 million. Camino Nuevo is recognized for its superior results with bilingual education. The school was built in a converted mini-mall, a choice that was recognized for its innovative architectural improvements to the built environment of the community. The school has been the subject of multiple case studies concerning community-based education.

== Psychology career ==
In 2015 Lance opened a private practice as a clinical psychologist. He is a supervisor of doctoral interns in psychology and co-hosts a podcast titled New Books in Psychoanalysis. He is the co-chair of the Continuing Education Committee at the Psychoanalytic Center of California. He serves on the faulty of the Reiss-Davis Graduate School teaching psychodynamic theory and practice.
