= Gina Lamb =

American contemporary artist (born 1959)

Gina Lamb (born 1959) is an American artist, activist, and educator best known for video collaborations with underrepresented communities that explore issues including race, gender identity, class, immigrant experiences, Indigenous rights, and LGBTQ rights. Lives in Los Angeles.

== Early life and education ==
Lamb grew up in Baltimore, Maryland. She moved to San Francisco in 1979 to attend the San Francisco Art Institute (SFAI). There, she developed an interest in performance art and video production. She earned her Bachelor of Fine Arts (BFA) in 1981. In 1984, she relocated to Southern California after being accepted into the New Forms and Concepts (currently New Genres) at the UCLA School of the Arts and Architecture. At UCLA, she pursued her interests in video and Installation/Sculpture, earning a Master of Fine Arts (MFA) in 1987.

== Artistic practice ==
After exhibiting her sculptural video installations in various Los Angeles gallery shows, Lamb sought to move beyond treating moving images as static art objects displayed in isolated gallery spaces. She became interested in how video could serve the broader community as a form of social sculpture, a dynamic and a democratic tool, particularly for marginalized groups such as queer youth of color and Indigenous communities. Her aim was to enable these groups to reclaim their narratives and advocate for institutional justice by involving them in the production process of participatory video and fostering collaborative relationships with the subjects of her work.

=== Video collaborations ===
Between 1988 and 1996, Lamb developed a media arts curriculum for 300 students annually at Jefferson High School in South Central Los Angeles integrated media literacy and production-based learning into an interdisciplinary humanities program. As an artist-in-residence and the Artist Project Coordinator under the auspices of the Los Angeles Unified School District (LAUSD) through the Humanitas Media Arts Mobilization Project (MAMP), she collaborated with under-resourced students through creative writing, digital video, and web production to foster empowerment, producing about 100 student-made videos. As Lamb put it, “My major goal is to let them know their opinion is important and video is a way that people will see it and take notice.” Lamb and the Jefferson High School students produced single-channel video works that discussed social issues affecting them and their community, culminating in an exhibition in 1990, Magnetic Youth: Teen-Powered TV, presented at Los Angeles Contemporary Exhibitions (LACE). Two years later, after experiencing the Rodney King uprising, they produced new video works to address the social climate and the media's representation of their community in South Central, shown later that year at the Long Beach Museum of Art.

Continuing her work as an artist-in-residence from 1996 to 2000, Lamb integrated media arts into the curriculum at Magnolia Avenue Elementary, a school in the Pico Union neighborhood of Los Angeles serving a multicultural, low income student body. She launched the Poetry In Motion, a program that brought five media and creative writing artists in residence to collaborate with students. Together, they produced animated films, digital videos, multimedia, and CD-ROMs, featuring students’ creative writing through visual storytelling.

==== REACH LA and LGBTQ youth ====
In response to the lack of representation of inner-city LGBTQ youth in mainstream media and educational settings, Lamb developed media arts projects and produced collaborative video works that addressed social issues such as HIV/AIDS prevention and Gay Rights. These initiatives were presented as the Reel Ghetto Queer Workshop, offered at the Realistic Education in Action Coalition to foster Health (REACH LA), a non-profit arts organization that promotes self-empowerment, community engagement, and access to social and sexual health services for LGBTQ youth. Lamb served as REACH's Art and Technology Programs Director from 1999 to 2009. Through Lamb's interactions with LGBTQ youth at REACH, she helped them make visible what was missing in mainstream media, telling their stories, which had been systematically excluded. Many of the videos produced through the Reel Ghetto Queer Workshop were featured in Queer Youth Nation, a recurring 90-minute video shorts program presented at the Outfest annual LGBT Film Festival in Los Angeles. Winning Outfest's 2005 OUTstanding Documentary Short Film for This is How I Love You, written and directed by Christopher Harris, produced by Gina Lamb and REACH LA.

The Emerald City, poster for the Ovahness Ball #3, by Gina Lamb & Icon Sean/Milan™, 2008.

In 2006, through REACH LA, Lamb and Icon Sean/Milan™ organized substance-free House and Ballroom events to support young gay and trans people of color. These ongoing events known as the Ovahness Ball serve as platforms for community engagement, HIV testing, health education, and service referrals. Lamb collaborated with House and Ballroom participants to produce posters promoting the Ovahness Balls and numerous video works that were screened at various LGBTQ film festivals. Notably, the documentary I'm Still Here: Becoming Legendary, which she produced with Icon Sean/Milan™, received the 2006 Fan Favorite award at Outfest's Fusion LGBTQ People of Color Festival. It highlights the creative individuals within the West Hollywood and Los Angeles House and Ballroom scene and their personal narratives.

In response to the tragic overdose deaths of Gemmel Moore in 2017 and Timothy Michael Dean in 2019 at the West Hollywood residence of political fundraiser Ed Buck, Gina Lamb, Edward “Enyce” Smith, and Beyond the Runway collaborated to produce Crystal Diaries (2021). This documentary examines how the LGBTQ community and its allies united to provide mutual support, raise awareness, and protest the justice system's handling of Moore's and Dean's deaths. Additionally, the film offers an in-depth exploration of the impact of methamphetamine addiction within the Los Angeles LGBTQ+ House and Ball community. Crystal Diaries was featured at the 2021 OutFest LGBTQ Film Festival, and was screened at various social service agencies throughout Los Angeles.

==== Media Arts for Social Justice ====
As an adjunct professor of Media Studies at Pitzer College, Lamb founded Media Arts for Social Justice (MASJ) in 2000 to offer courses where Pitzer students could engage in community activism through collaborative media production.

In 2005, MASJ began offering weekly Video Diary Workshops as the creative expression portion to the Girls and Gangs re-entry program, a nonprofit organization providing services to formerly incarcerated girls in the Los Angeles County juvenile justice system.

From 2006 to 2009, MASJ students led weekly video poetry and media literacy workshops for incarcerated youth at Camp Afflerbaugh-Paige, an LA County Juvenile Probation Camp located in La Verne, California, that houses male wards ages 13-18 for sentences of 6-18 months. Incarcerated teens wrote creative pieces about their lives, what got them locked up, reflections on their current situation, and hopes for the future.

Since 2009, MASJ students have worked with Children's Hospital LA's transgender youth health services, collaborating with youth to produce video documentaries and PSAs that discuss their struggles with misunderstanding and discrimination by the general public as they grow up and transition.

In 2009, MASJ students began a multi-year collaborative media partnership with the Costanoan Rumsen Carmel Tribe (a Tribe of the Ohlone People), documenting cultural events, workshops, and Tribal meetings. The Costanoan Rumsen reside near the Pitzer campus in Pomona after being displaced from their ancestral lands, ranging from San Francisco Bay to Big Sur. They were forced into exile to avoid violent persecution by settlers and California State-sponsored racist policies toward Native Americans. Currently, the Tribe is working on several cultural reclamation projects, including a website in collaboration with Lamb.

== Teaching ==
- 1988-2006, Associate Adjunct Professor of Media Studies, Pitzer College
- 1988, Visiting Lecturer Communications/Journalism, University of La Verne
- 1995-1996, Visiting Lecturer Fine Arts, Otis College of Art and Design

== Fellowships, grants, and awards ==
- 2012- 2013, California Council for the Humanities – Community Stories Grant
- 2001, City of Inglewood, Resolution of Appreciation in the Arts
- 2000-2003 California Arts Council, Artist-in-Residence, Media Arts
- 1996, Anonymous Was A Woman Award
- 1992-1996, City of Los Angeles Cultural Affairs, Artist in Community Grant-Media Arts
- 1994, Rockefeller Foundation Project Grant - Media Arts
- 1991, National Endowment for the Arts, Individual Artist Fellowship
