= Florida Interactive Entertainment Academy =

Coordinates: 28°32′48″N 81°23′06″W

Florida Interactive Entertainment Academy at the University of Central Florida
- Motto: "Enter. Active. Learning."
- Type: Graduate School
- Established: 2004
- Director: Ben Noel
- Postgraduates: 140
- Location: Orlando, Florida, United States
- Website: Official Site

Florida Interactive Entertainment Academy (FIEA) is a graduate school offering a Master of Science in Interactive Entertainment, in the University of Central Florida College of Sciences at the University of Central Florida located in Orlando, Florida, United States. The director of the school is Ben Noel, former vice president and chief operating officer of Electronic Arts' Orlando-based Tiburon studio.

FIEA is a graduate video game development school offering an accredited master's degree in interactive entertainment. Areas of study include game design, art, programming and production. The Academy is located at UCF Downtown, which also houses other graduate and undergraduate programs in art, business, education, health sciences, digital media, and film. FIEA was established in 2004 by UCF's School of Film and Digital Media and industry partners, and accepted its first class of students in Fall of 2005. The site of FIEA was formerly the downtown Expo Centre until late 2004 when the city of Orlando leased the building to the University. The campus is now recognized as UCF Downtown at Creative Village.

== Programs ==
FIEA follows a nonstandard educational philosophy which centers on the simulation of a professional video game development environment. The configuration of the building and course work is designed to reinforce this approach. Team-based work combining the efforts of students from the school's three primary disciplines of art, programming, and production is encouraged at all times. A capstone video game creation project for each class of students forms the focus of the second and third semesters of work, comprising pre-production and production phases, respectively.

FIEA's first class of twelve students graduated in December 2006. As of June 2023, FIEA has now graduated more than 940 students who have been hired by more than 250 companies worldwide. Recent graduates have accepted jobs at Microsoft Game Studios, Ubisoft, Electronic Arts, Google, Bungie, Bethesda, BioWare, Iron Galaxy Studios, Activision and many others.

== Notable Achievements ==
Games developed at FIEA:

- Class of December '06 - "Cohort 1"
  - The Blob
- Class of May '07 - "Cohort 2"
  - Opera Slinger - Independent Games Festival Student Showcase Winner, 2007.
  - Danger Zone
- Class of December '07 - "Cohort 3"
  - Master Plan
- Class of December '08 - "Cohort 4"
  - BizarreCraft
  - Zephyr: Tides of War
- Class of December '09 - "Cohort 5"
  - Sultans of Scratch
  - Drifters
- Class of December '10 - "Cohort 6"
  - Shadows of Abigail
  - 9 Lives 'Til Midnight
  - Eclipse
- Class of December '11 - "Cohort 7"
  - Nexus
  - Scarfell
  - Dead West
- Class of December '12 - "Cohort 8"
  - Plushy Knight
  - Penned
  - Battle Fortress Tortoise
- Class of December '13 - "Cohort 9"
  - Escherreal
  - Grapple
  - Pitch Jumper
  - Warp Derby
- Class of December '14 - "Cohort 10"
  - HIT
  - Focal Length
  - Neon Night Riders
- Class of December '15 - "Cohort 11"
  - Junkers
  - Lanterns
  - Life Unfolds
  - Mall Cop
  - Totem
- Class of December '16 - "Cohort 12"
  - Child No More
  - Ley Lines
  - Sketch Artist
  - The Channeler
- Class of December '17 - "Cohort 13"
  - The Draft
  - Hollowed
  - The Logician
  - MasterKey
- Class of December '18 - "Cohort 14"
  - Long Arm of the Law
  - Scamp: High Hat Havoc
  - Hyper Vital
  - The Great Emu War
  - Liminal
- Class of December '19 - "Cohort 15"
  - Malediction
  - In Harmony
  - Drift Light
  - Snowfall Village
- Class of December '20 - "Cohort 16"
  - Flicker of Hope (Wick)
  - Keepers of the Trees
  - Izcalli of the Wind
  - Kore
- Class of December '21 - "Cohort 17"
  - Peblito - Rock and Roll
  - Rings of Hell
  - The Last Spark
  - Zenko - A Fox's Tale
- Class of December '22 - "Cohort 18"
  - Soul Shard
  - K3LVN
  - Drain Runner
  - Hermea
- Class of December '23 - "Cohort 19"
  - Cecelia
  - Deckweaver
  - Bloodsong
  - Heart and Core
- Class of December '24 - "Cohort 20"
  - Caesura
  - CHROMA
  - Fantasmagorie
  - Starboard
- Class of December '25 - "Cohort 21"
  - Crimson Knight
  - Dillo's Dilemma
  - Husk Planet
  - Punk Rock Exorcist
