= CityLAB =

US research center

cityLAB is a multidisciplinary research center within UCLA's Department of Architecture and Urban Design. Founded in 2006 by Dana Cuff and Roger Sherman, CityLAB leverages design, research, policy, and education to promote equitable and sustainable cities. CityLAB's work engages urban issues including affordable housing, equitable public space, and underrepresented narratives in Los Angeles and other cities.

== Notable projects ==
=== Housing research and policy ===
cityLAB has developed proposals and policies that address the California affordable housing shortage, including co-authoring housing policy legislation.

One of cityLAB's longstanding research projects is addressing Los Angeles' housing shortage by building additional units in the backyards of single-family houses. cityLAB's research showed how outdated fire codes, setback requirements, and parking requirements could be adjusted to make such additional units, also called backyard homes or accessory dwelling units (ADUs), easier to permit. In 2015, cityLAB partnered with Kevin Daly Architects and UCLA architecture graduate students to build the BI(h)OME, a full-scale, prefabricated ADU prototype on UCLA’s campus. Based on their research into backyard homes, cityLAB co-authored AB 2299 (Bloom, 2016), which reduces restrictions on ADUs statewide and became state law in 2017. Working with the city of Los Angeles, cityLAB created a handbook guides homeowners in the process of building an ADU legally. 83,865 ADUs were permitted in California between 2016 and 2022.

In addition to backyard homes, cityLAB has identified other overlooked land that could be sites for affordable housing. Starting in 2018, they researched building affordable housing for teachers and other education staff on public land owned by schools, including K-12 public schools, community colleges, and public universities. Working with the Center for Cities + Schools at UC Berkeley, the Terner Center for Housing Innovation at UC Berkeley, and the Chan Zuckerberg Foundation, cityLAB found that every county in California has public school-owned land with the potential for education workforce housing. Based on this research, cityLAB co-authored AB 2295 (Bloom, 2022), which makes it easier for California school districts to build housing on their property, supporting efforts to attract and retain teachers. AB 2295 went into effect on January 1, 2024. cityLAB is working with school board members and district staff to train them in the process of planning and constructing affordable housing.

=== BruinHub ===
In 2019, cityLAB and UCLA’s Transportation Services found that 43% of students commuting to campus had one-way commutes of 60 minutes or more, and of those students, 42% had slept overnight on or near campus, sometimes in their cars, rather than commute home at night. To meet the needs of these housing-insecure and long-distance commuter students, cityLAB designed the BruinHub, a dedicated space in a former squash court in UCLA’s John Wooden Center which opened in 2021. The BruinHub provides study tables, charging stations, snacks, a microwave and refrigerator, as well as bean-shaped pods for naps, which were designed in partnership with Marta Nowak, a founder of the design studio AN.ONYMOUS. The project is a collaboration between cityLAB and UCLA Recreation, UCLA Student Affairs and the student organization Bruin Commuters. In winter quarter of 2024, a second BruinHub opened in the Strathmore Building on campus.

=== Public space work ===
With support from the UCLA Lewis Center for Regional Policy Studies, cityLAB studied intergenerational public space use in the Westlake neighborhood of Los Angeles in 2021. In 2022, they conducted a post-occupancy evaluation of Golden Age Park, a pocket park in the Westlake neighborhood, and organized a public celebration in the park. In partnership with the community organization Heart of Los Angeles and with support from the Institute of Transportation Studies, cityLAB has worked directly with youth to research how sidewalks impact their mobility and can support their independent travel.

=== Urban Humanities Initiative ===
In 2013, supported by funding from the Andrew W. Mellon Foundation, CityLAB launched the interdisciplinary Urban Humanities Initiative at UCLA, bringing together students and scholars from architecture, urban studies, and the humanities to study contemporary urban issues in the megacities of Mexico City, Tokyo, Shanghai and Los Angeles. UCLA’s Urban Humanities Initiative was a main sponsor of the inaugural Urban Humanities Network conference, which was held in Tucson, AZ in 2023.

== Awards ==
The BI(h)OME, designed by Kevin Daly Architects based on cityLAB's research on backyard homes, received an AIA Small Project Award in 2018.

In 2019, cityLAB founder Dana Cuff received Architectural Record’s Women in Architecture Activist Award for her work at cityLAB. In 2020, she received recognition for cityLAB by receiving the ARCC James Haecker Award for Distinguished Leadership in Architectural Research, and in 2022, she received a UCLA Public Impact Research Award.

== Local engagement ==
cityLAB has developed long-term partnerships with community organizations in Los Angeles, including the Los Angeles Public Library and Heart of Los Angeles. Reflections and Markings are two projects in partnership with these organizations that focus on telling immigrant histories in the neighborhood of Westlake, Los Angeles.
