= Barquisimeto =

- City
- Nueva Segovia de Barquisimeto
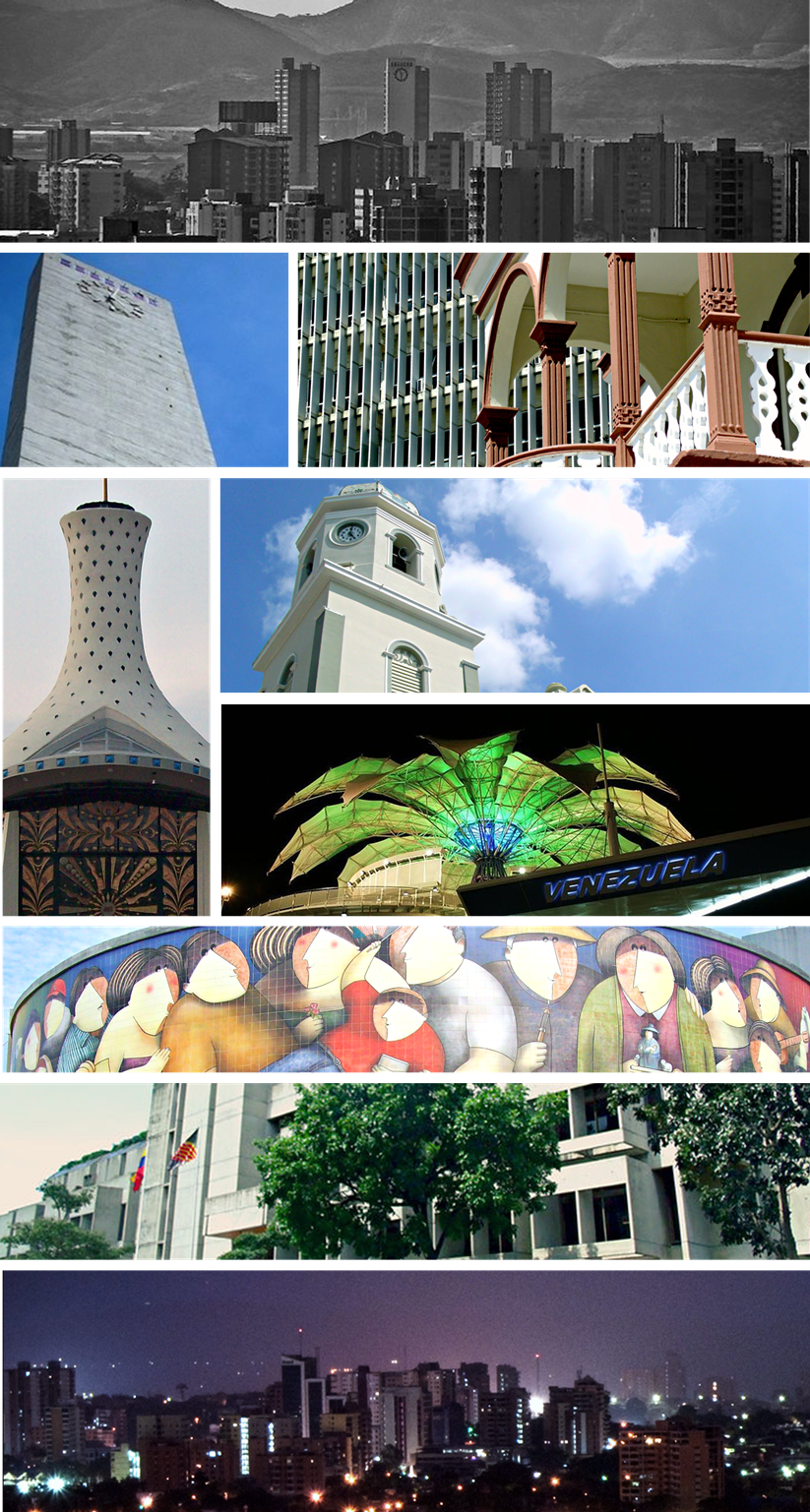
- Top: Skyline view of West Barrio Nuevo; Second: Obelisk of Barquisimeto, Barquisimeto Municipal Tower and Casa de Eustaquio Gomez; Third: Barquisimeto Metropolitan Cathedral, Santa Rosa Church, Flower of Venezuela; Fourth: West-Central Lisandro Alvarado University; Fifth: Barquisimeto Government Palace Bottom: Night view of central Carrera

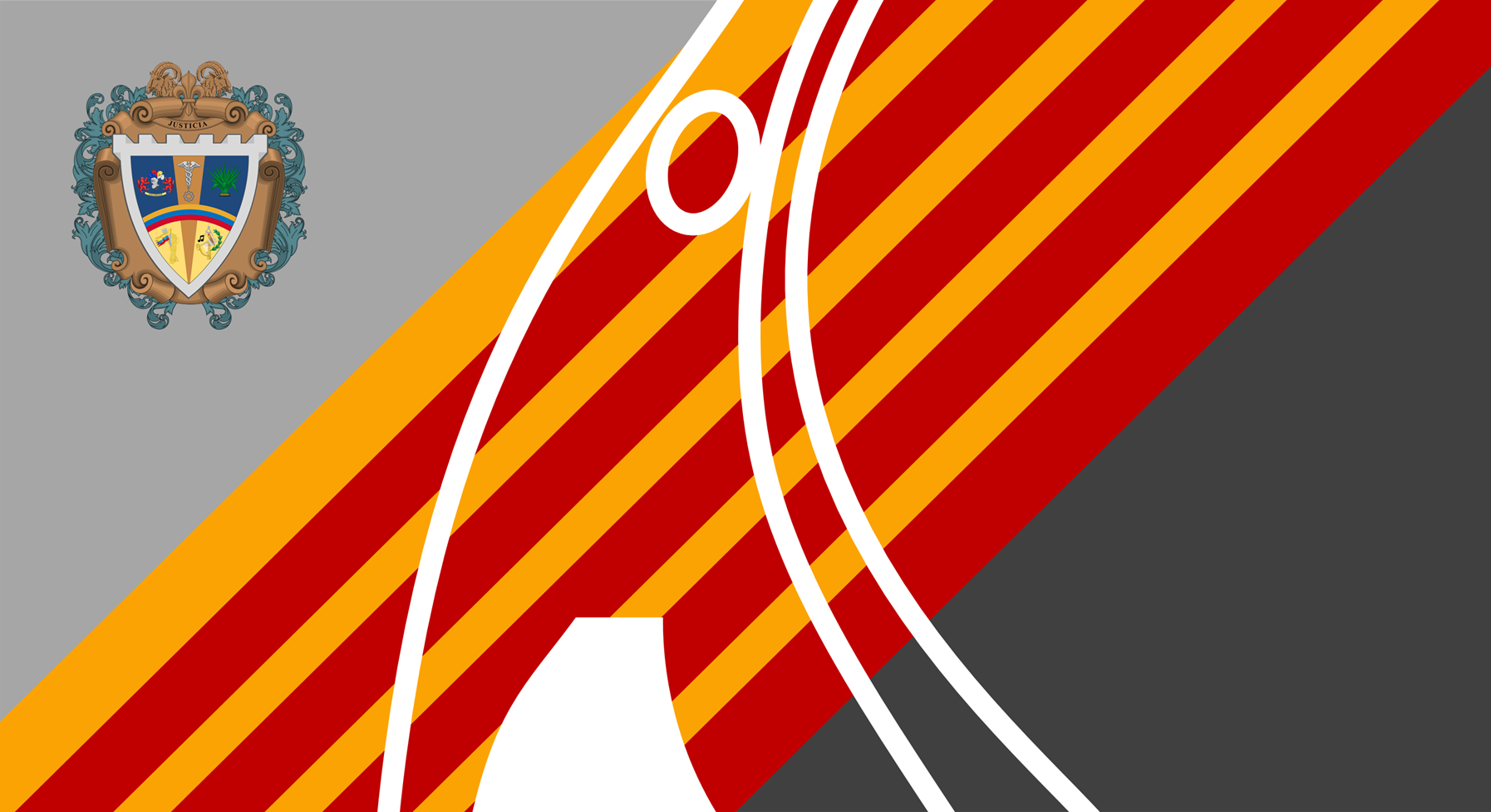
- Flag Coat of arms
- Nickname(s): "Capital musical de Venezuela" (English: Musical capital of Venezuela). "Ciudad Crepuscular" (English: "Twilight City")
- Location within Venezuela Location within South America
- Coordinates: 10°03′49″N 69°20′05″W
- Country: Venezuela
- State: Lara
- Municipality: Iribarren
- Founded: 1552
- Founder: Juan de Villegas

Government
  - Mayor: Yanys Aguero (PSUV)

Area
  - City: 276 km^{2} (107 sq mi)
  - Urban: 194 km^{2} (75 sq mi)
- Elevation: 600 m (2,000 ft)

Population (2022)
  - City: 1,240,714
  - Rank: 4th in Venezuela
  - Density: 4,400/km^{2} (11,500/sq mi)
- Demonym(s): barquisimetano, guaro
- Time zone: UTC−4 (VET)
- Postal code: 3001 - 3023
- Area code: 0251
- Climate: BSh
- Website: Local government website (in Spanish)
- The area and population figures are for the municipality.

Barquisimeto is the capital city of Lara and seat of the Iribarren Municipality in Venezuela. Barquisimeto is located in the Central-Western Region. The city is an important urban, industrial, commercial, musical, and transportational center in the country, recognized as the fourth-largest city by population after Caracas, Maracaibo, and Valencia.

Barquisimeto is sometimes referred to as the "Music City of Venezuela" due to the large number of musical institutions there. Gustavo Dudamel, the director of the Simón Bolívar Symphony Orchestra and the Los Angeles Philharmonic, was born in the city.

== History ==
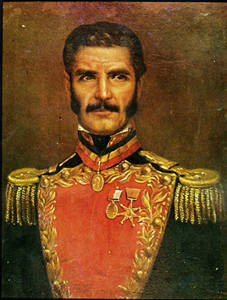
Jacinto Lara General

Barquisimeto was founded in 1552 by Juan de Villegas, as a headquarters and to have better control of the territory believed to be rich in gold. Its original name was Nueva Segovia de Barquisimeto and then it was shortened to just Barquisimeto.

This city changed locations four times between 1552 and 1563. The original settlement was near the Buría River, but moved in 1556 due to frequent floods suffered by inhabitants. The second location was in the valley of the Turbio River, where the city stayed until Lope de Aguirre burned it down in 1561. The city was rebuilt 102 km (63 mi), but in 1562 they inhabitants asked for permission to move to another site due to strong winds blowing in the place. Finally, Barquisimeto was moved to the north plateau of the Turbio River in 1563.

During the country's independence, Barquisimeto joined the liberation movement and its deputy José Ángel Álamo signed the Independence Act on 5 July 1811.

In 1929, the city went through a modernization program carried out by General Juan Vicente Gomez. He fixed the streets and avenues and buildings were built, like the Jacinto Lara Headquarters, the Government Palace and the Ayacucho Park.

=== Names and etymology ===
According to the German adventurer Nikolaus Federmann, the Caquetío aborigines used to call it Variquicimeto, which translates as "ash-colored river", the name with which the natives distinguished the water stream near the city. This river was named "Turbio River" by the Spanish conquerors, a name that is still in use today. Another possible name origin is due to a red dye called bariquí. When Juan de Villegas founded it, he named the city "Nueva Segovia de Barquisimeto" but years later it became just "Barquisimeto", a word popularized by Oviedo y Baños in History and Conquest of the Venezuelan Population.

== Religion ==
The city's modern Cathedral of Our Lady of Mount Carmel is the cathedral of the episcopal see of the Roman Catholic Archdiocese of Barquisimeto.

=== Divina Pastora ===
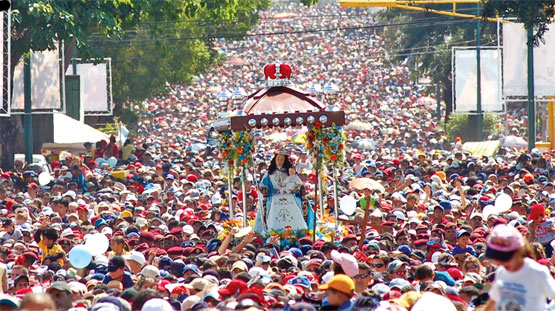
Procession of the Divina Pastora

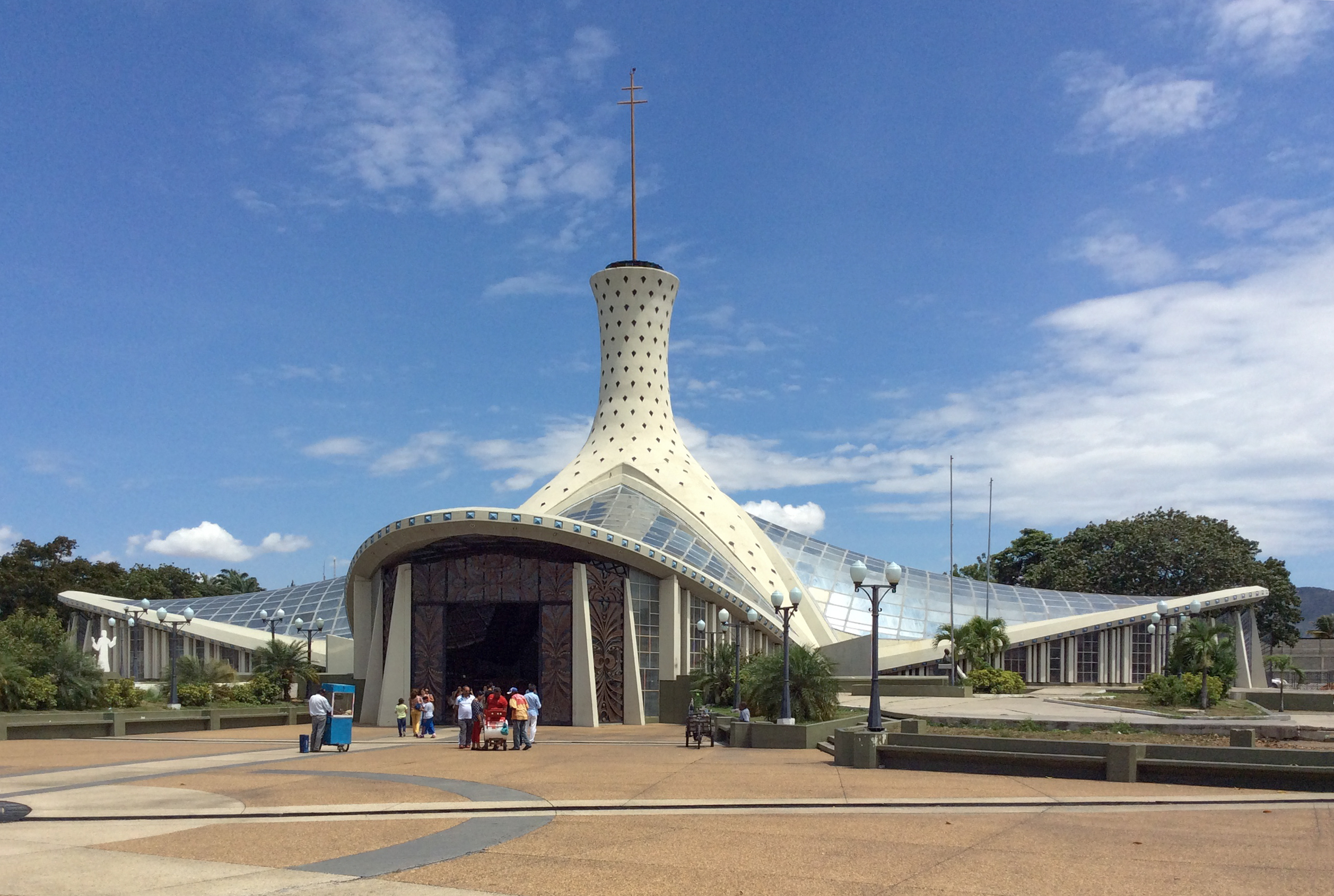
Barquisimeto Cathedral

The Divina Pastora (Divine Shepherdess) is a statue of the Virgin Mary holding the infant Jesus, with a lamb at her side. It is considered to be one of the most important religious icons of Venezuela. Divina Pastora is the patron saint of the city of Barquisimeto and of the Venezuelan National Militia. The original image dates from 1735. Divina Pastora is celebrated in a procession on 14 January of each year, when a massive Marian procession occurs, considered to be one of the largest in the world, attracting thousands of pilgrims.

The statue is removed from its shrine and is carried on the main streets of Barquisimeto in a procession which starts at the Iglesia de la Divina Pastora in Santa Rosa until it reaches the Barquisimeto Cathedral. This procession is unlike other mass Marian celebrations in the world, where the image does not leave its temple. This procession occurs due to the devotion the people of Barquisimeto have towards it as gratitude towards saving the city from a cholera outbreak that occurred in the city in the 19th century. In 2013, 3,000,000 faithful honored the Divina Pastora.

== Geography ==
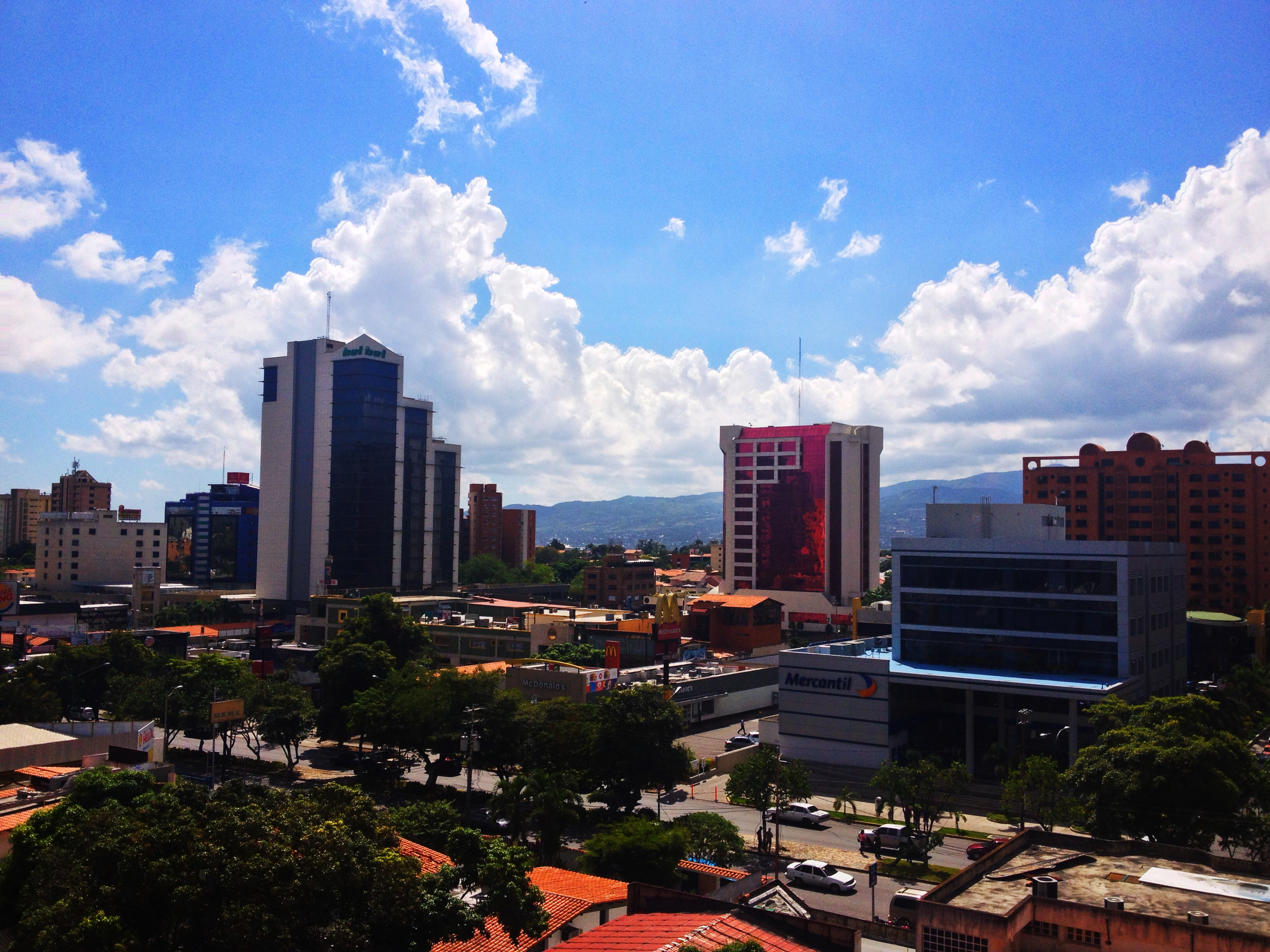
Barquisimeto East

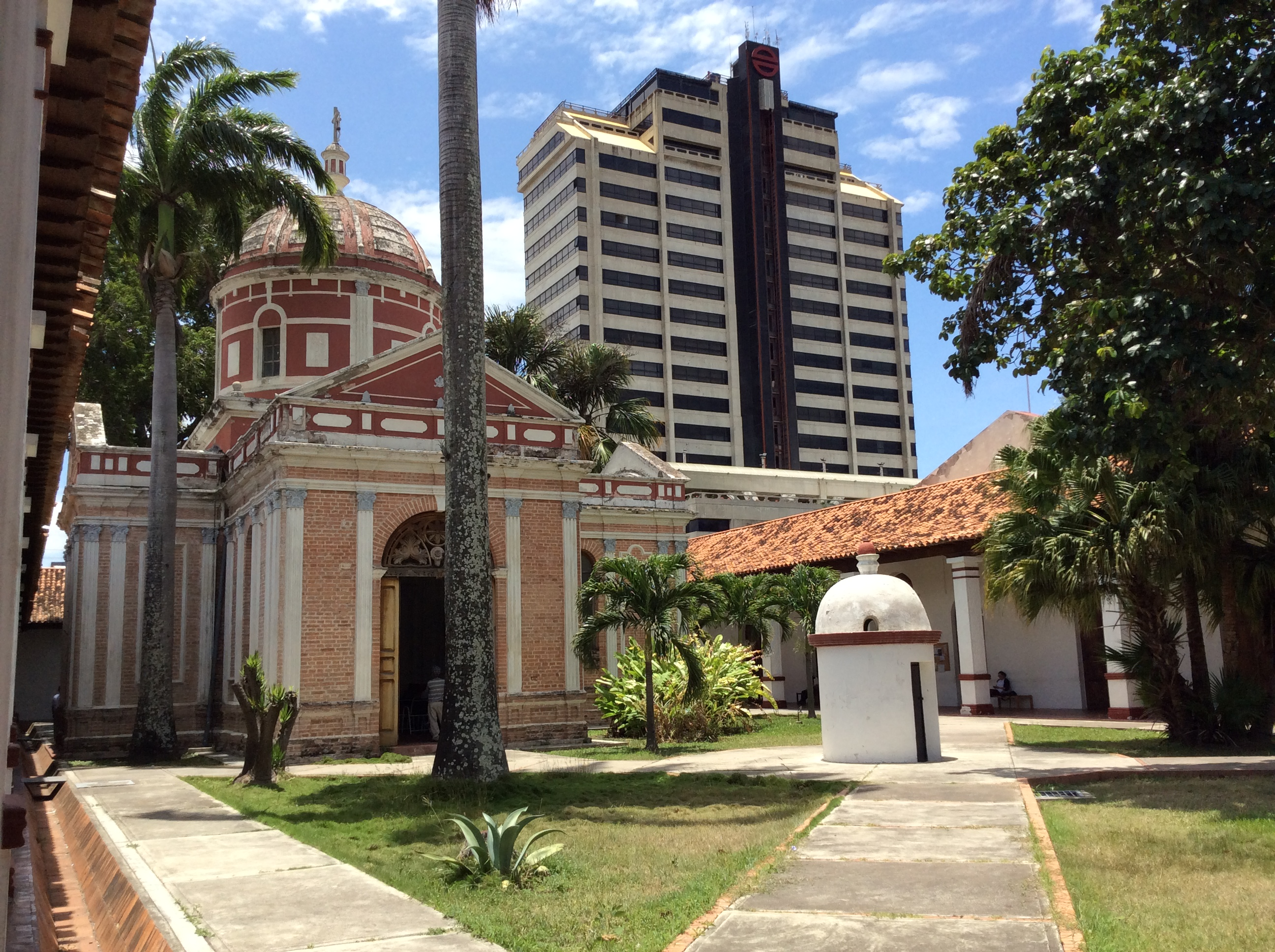
Chapel San Miguel

Barquisimeto is built on the terrace of the same name, on the banks of the Turbio River, about 600 meters (~2000 feet) above sea level, gradually sloping from 520 metres (1,710 feet) in the eastern part of the city to 700 metres (2,300 feet) in the west. As the city lies at the northern edge of the Andes, it is bounded on the south by mountains with elevations ranging from 1000 meters to over 2000 meters, such as Loma de Leon (which is the nearest peak to the city, 1331 meters above sea level), Cerro Patriciera (1629 meters a.s.l.), and Cerro Lara (2251 meters a.s.l.). To the northwest of Barquisimeto there are the Saroche hills (e.g. Cerro Copeyal at 1323 meters a.s.l.) and to the northeast there are the Sierra de Aroa mountains (e.g. Cerro Atravesado at 1712 meters a.s.l.).

Barquisimeto is located in central-western Venezuela, 363 km (226 mi) from Caracas, the country's capital city. Being a point of convergence of major road and rail routes, it has a diverse economy and has grown into a large city of 930,000 inhabitants. Its flat relief has enabled a systematic urban grid with streets numbered in ascending numerical order, and consistent signage that helps with locating addresses. Barquisimeto has an average temperature of 25 °C (77 °F) throughout the year; its driest period is from December to March.

=== Neighboring municipalities ===
- North: Urdaneta Municipality
- South: Palavecino Municipality
- East: Peña Municipality, Yaracuy State
- West: Jiménez and Torres Municipalities.

=== Large-magnitude earthquakes (Richter’s scale) ===
- 6.6 (8/3/1950)
- 5.6 (3/5/1975)
- 6.3 (9/12/2009)

=== Climate ===
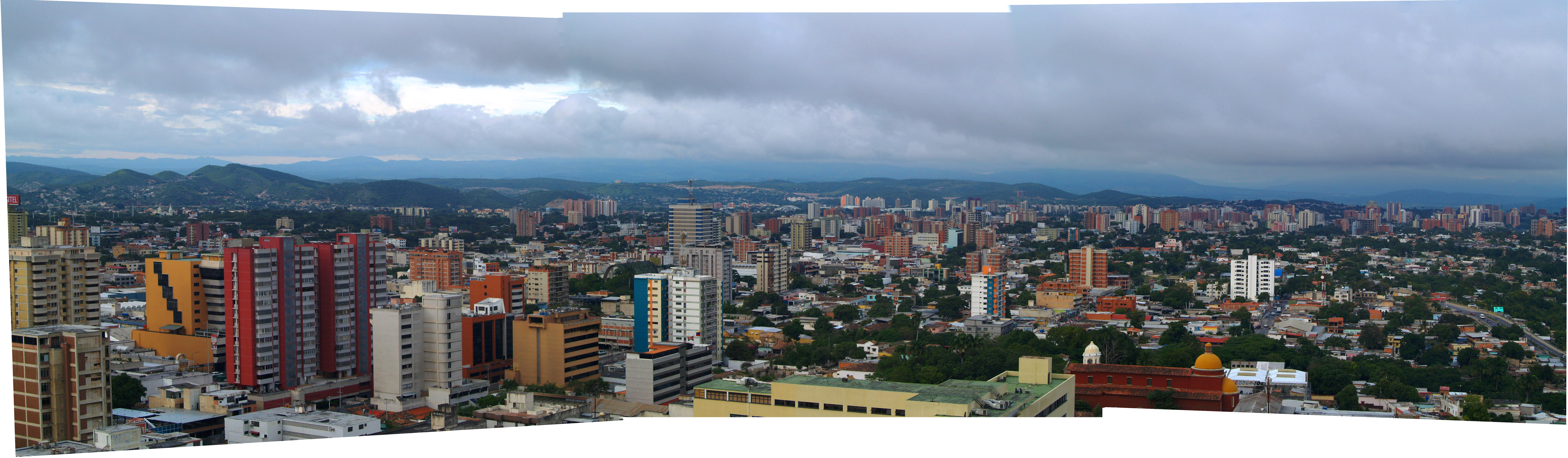
Panoramic view of Baquisimeto

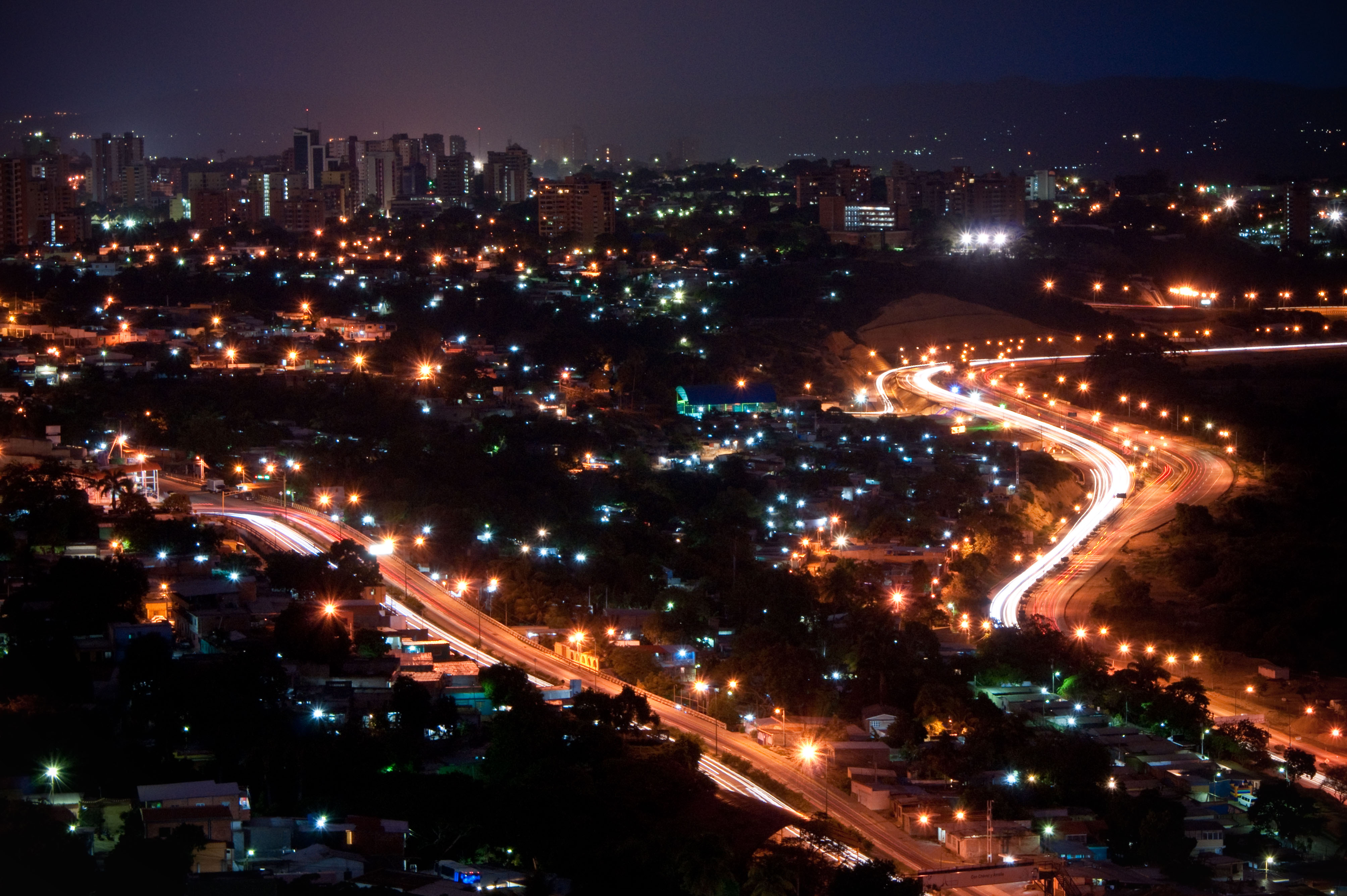
Barquisimeto at night

In the city, a hot semi-arid climate (Köppen BSh) is dominant. Located in that region, Barquisimeto records 550 millimetres or 21.7 inches of rain per year and its average temperature ranges 25 °C (77 °F). However, in higher regions near the Andes, temperatures are lower and the rain is more constant. For instance, in Sanare city, the annual average rainfall is 835 millimetres or 32.9 inches.

Climate data for Barquisimeto, Venezuela (1991–2020 normals, extremes 1971–2020)
Month	Jan	Feb	Mar	Apr	May	Jun	Jul	Aug	Sep	Oct	Nov	Dec	Year
Record high °C (°F)	38.0 (100.4)	36.6 (97.9)	39.4 (102.9)	35.9 (96.6)	35.6 (96.1)	35.9 (96.6)	35.9 (96.6)	39.6 (103.3)	36.3 (97.3)	34.8 (94.6)	35.2 (95.4)	33.9 (93.0)	39.6 (103.3)
Mean daily maximum °C (°F)	30.9 (87.6)	31.8 (89.2)	32.3 (90.1)	31.8 (89.2)	31.3 (88.3)	30.6 (87.1)	30.4 (86.7)	31.1 (88.0)	31.5 (88.7)	30.9 (87.6)	30.7 (87.3)	30.5 (86.9)	31.1 (88.0)
Daily mean °C (°F)	23.5 (74.3)	24.0 (75.2)	24.7 (76.5)	25.1 (77.2)	25.0 (77.0)	24.3 (75.7)	24.0 (75.2)	24.3 (75.7)	24.7 (76.5)	24.5 (76.1)	24.3 (75.7)	23.8 (74.8)	24.4 (75.9)
Mean daily minimum °C (°F)	19.1 (66.4)	19.4 (66.9)	20.3 (68.5)	21.4 (70.5)	21.6 (70.9)	21.2 (70.2)	20.9 (69.6)	21.0 (69.8)	21.2 (70.2)	21.2 (70.2)	21.0 (69.8)	20.0 (68.0)	20.7 (69.3)
Record low °C (°F)	13.4 (56.1)	13.2 (55.8)	12.6 (54.7)	15.2 (59.4)	16.5 (61.7)	16.1 (61.0)	16.4 (61.5)	15.4 (59.7)	15.4 (59.7)	11.1 (52.0)	15.0 (59.0)	13.8 (56.8)	11.1 (52.0)
Average rainfall mm (inches)	12.1 (0.48)	9.7 (0.38)	18.6 (0.73)	52.1 (2.05)	59.2 (2.33)	75.5 (2.97)	61.6 (2.43)	56.3 (2.22)	50.7 (2.00)	72.1 (2.84)	58.1 (2.29)	39.8 (1.57)	565.8 (22.28)
Average rainy days (≥ 1.0 mm)	2.4	1.5	2.3	6.2	7.6	11.6	10.4	8.9	7.0	8.8	6.2	5.4	78.3
Average relative humidity (%)	68.5	66.5	65.5	70.0	74.0	75.0	74.5	73.0	72.5	73.0	73.0	72.0	71.5
Mean monthly sunshine hours	260.4	235.2	241.8	183.0	192.2	201.0	232.5	241.8	228.0	226.3	222.0	248.0	2,712.2
Mean daily sunshine hours	8.4	8.4	7.8	6.1	6.2	6.7	7.5	7.8	7.6	7.3	7.4	8.0	7.4
Source 1: NOAA (sun 1971–1990)
Source 2: Instituto Nacional de Meteorología e Hidrología (humidity 1970–1998)

== Education ==
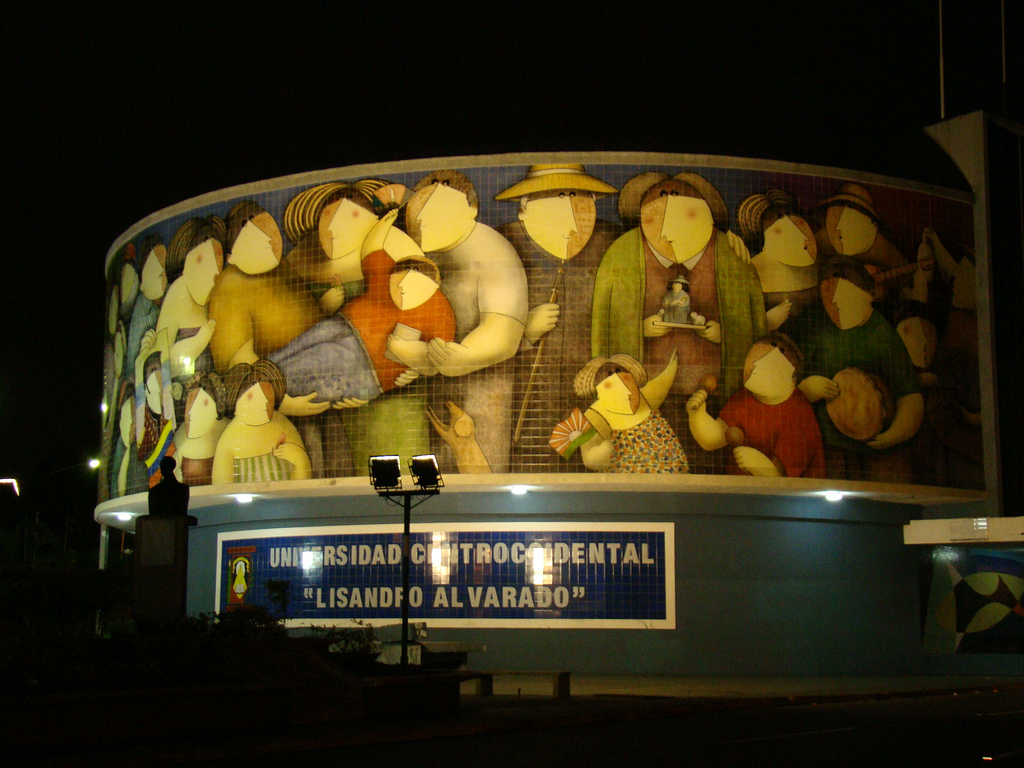
Mosaic Rectorate of the Universidad Centroccidental Lisandro Alvarado

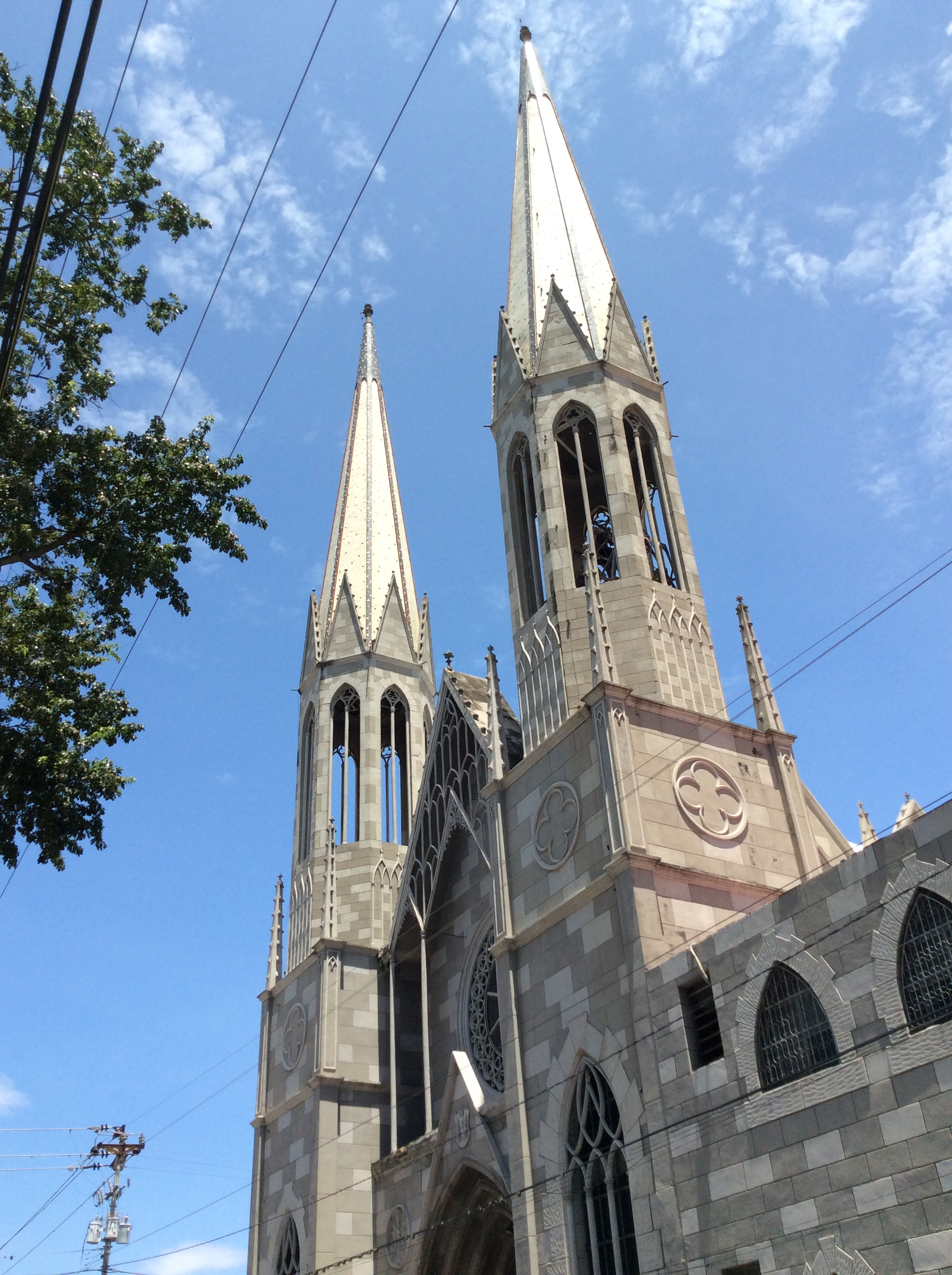
Nuestra Señora de la Paz Sanctuary

Major universities in the city include Universidad Centroccidental Lisandro Alvarado and Universidad Nacional Experimental Politécnica Antonio José de Sucre.

=== Other universities and colleges ===
Public institutions

- Universidad Centroccidental Lisandro Alvarado (UCLA)
- National Polytechnic Experimental University Antonio José de Sucre (UNEXPO)
- Libertador's Experimental and Pedagogical University (UPEL)
- Andrés Eloy Blanco's Territorial and Polytechnic of Lara University (IUETAEB - former Andrés Eloy Blanco's Experimental and Technology Institute)
- National Open University (UNA)
- Simón Rodríguez's National Experimental University (UNESR)
- Central University of Venezuela (UCV - Barquisimeto's Regional Center)
- Bolivarian University of Venezuela (UBV)
- National Experimental University of the Armed Forces (UNEFA)

Private institutions

- Fermin Toro University (UFT)
- Yacambú University (UNY)
- Fermin Toro College (CUFT)
- Rodolfo Loero Arismendi Technology and Industrial Institute (IUTIRLA)
- National Institute of Socialist Education and Capacitation (INCES)
- Antonio José de Sucre Technology Institute (IUTAJS)
- Jesús Obrero Institute (IUJO)

== Hospitals ==
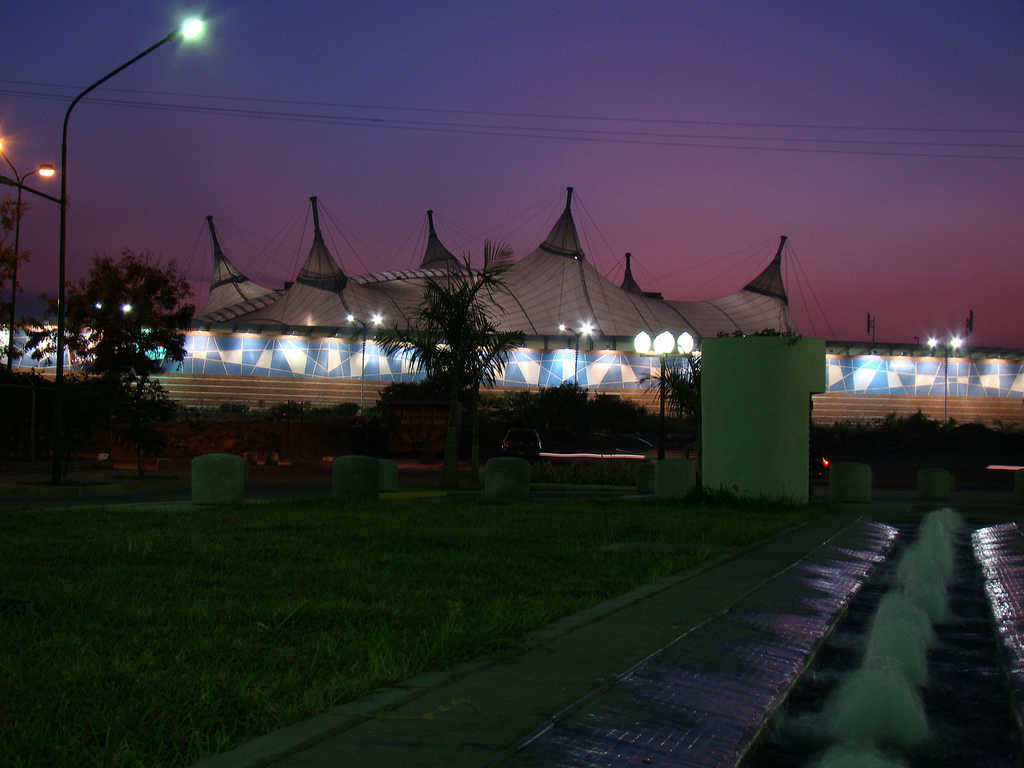
C.C Sambil Barquisimeto

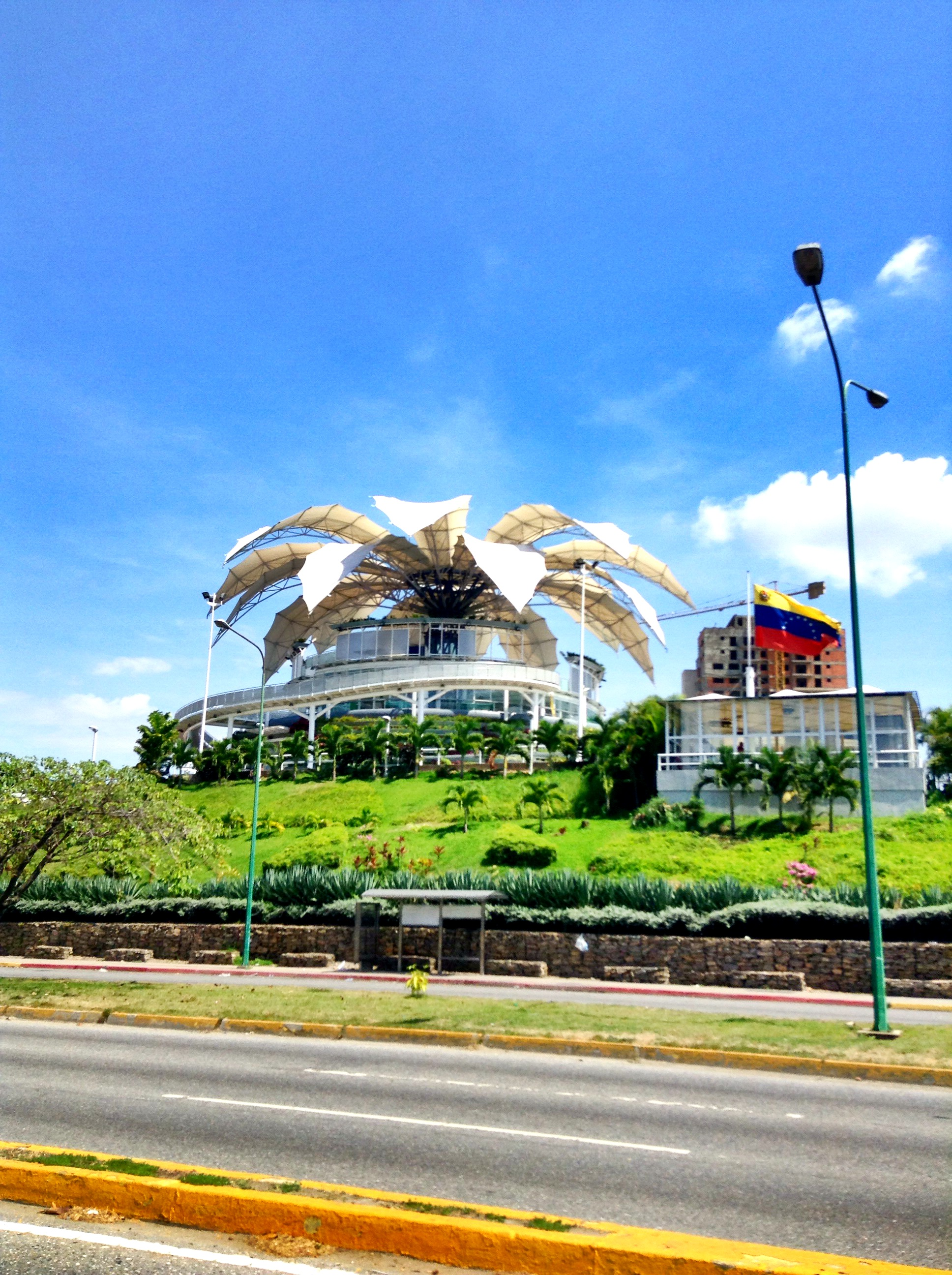
La Flor de Venezuela

=== Private hospitals ===
- Clínica IDB Barquisimeto

Address: Carrera 19 esquina calle 34

- Clínica Razetti de Barquisimeto

Address: Carrera 21

- Policlínica Barquisimeto

Address: Av. Lara (paseo Los Leones y calle Madrid)

- Previmédica IDB Los Abogados

Address: Av. Los Abogados (calles 16 y 17). 50 mts. from Av. Vargas

- Previmédica IDB Centro

Address: Calle 34 (carreras 19 y 20)

- Previmédica IDB Oeste

Address: Av. Pedro León Torres (calle 59). CC Sotavento

=== Public hospitals ===
- Hospital Central Universitario Antonio María Pineda

Address: Av. Libertador

- Hospital Dr. Luis Gómez López

Address: Barrio La Feria

=== Gallery Images ===
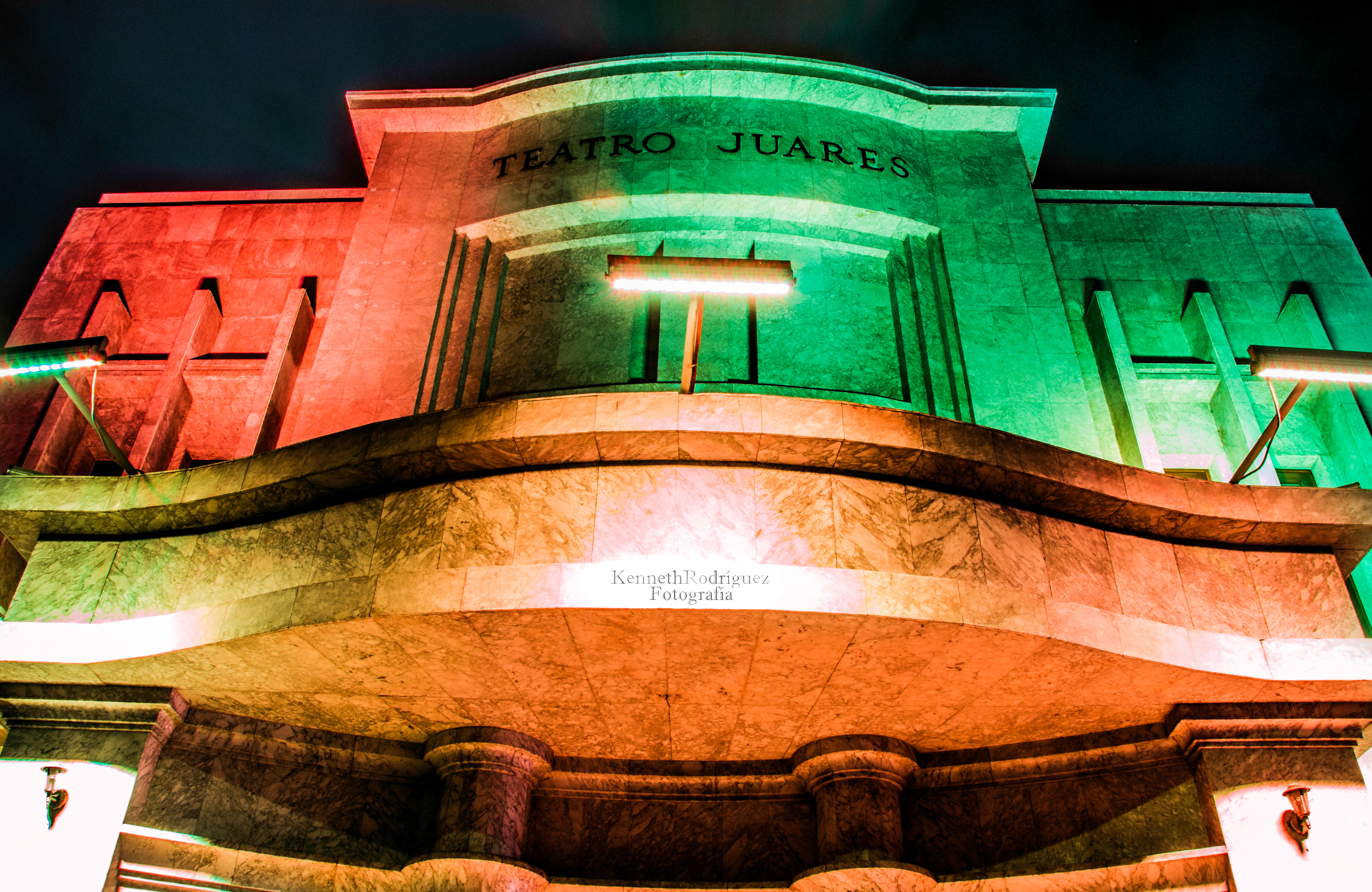
Juares Theater

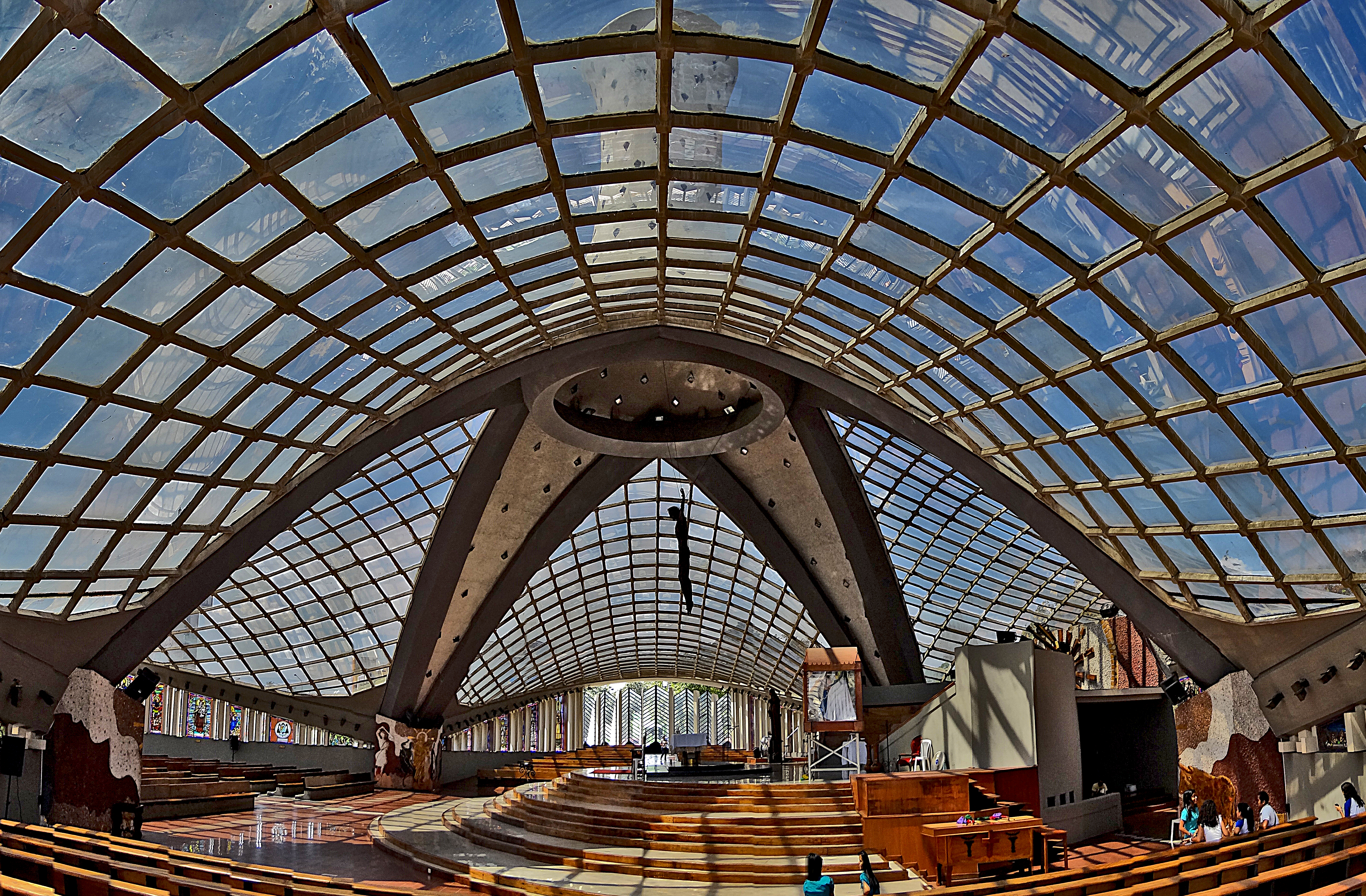
Barquisimeto Cathedral Inside

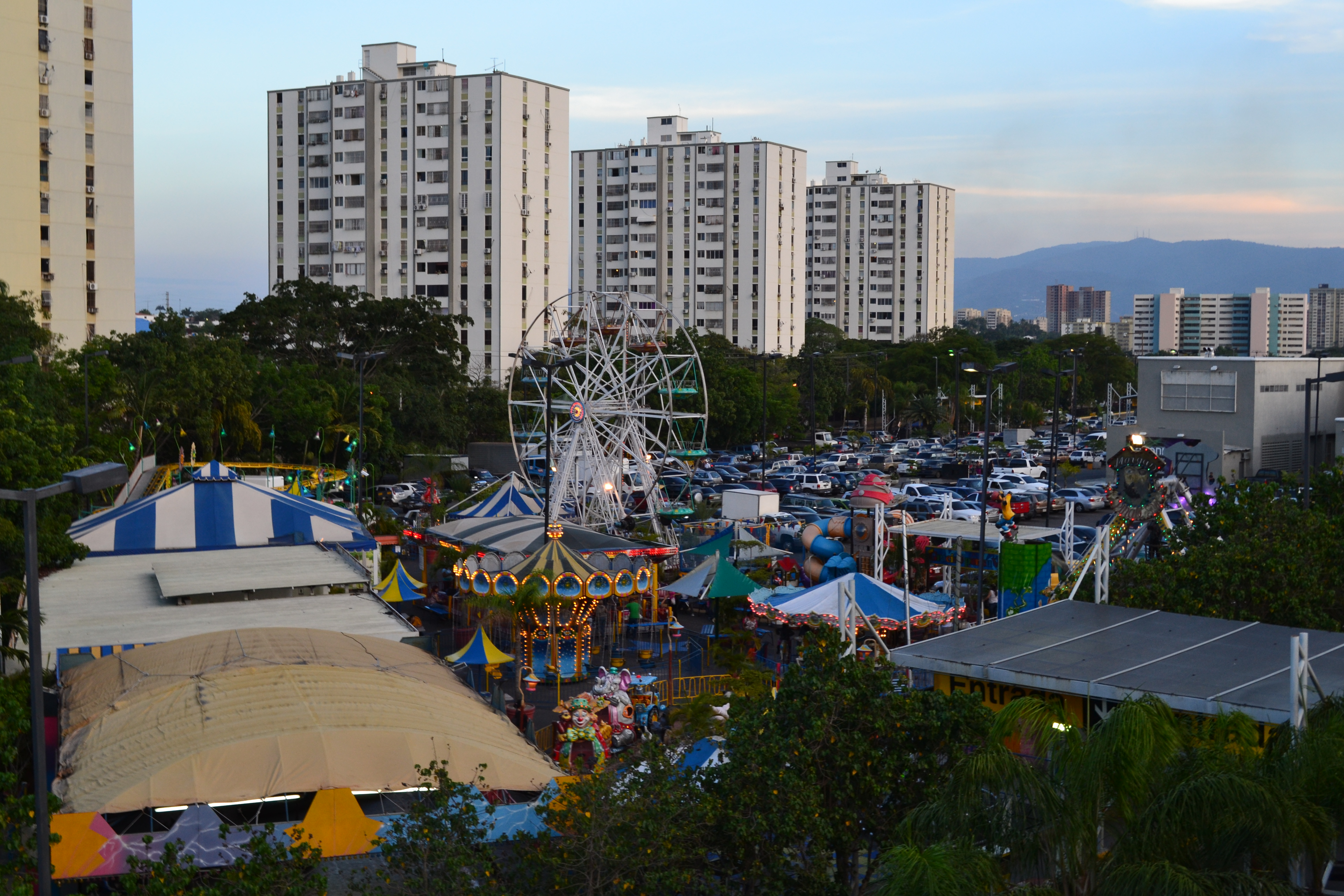
Barquisimeto East

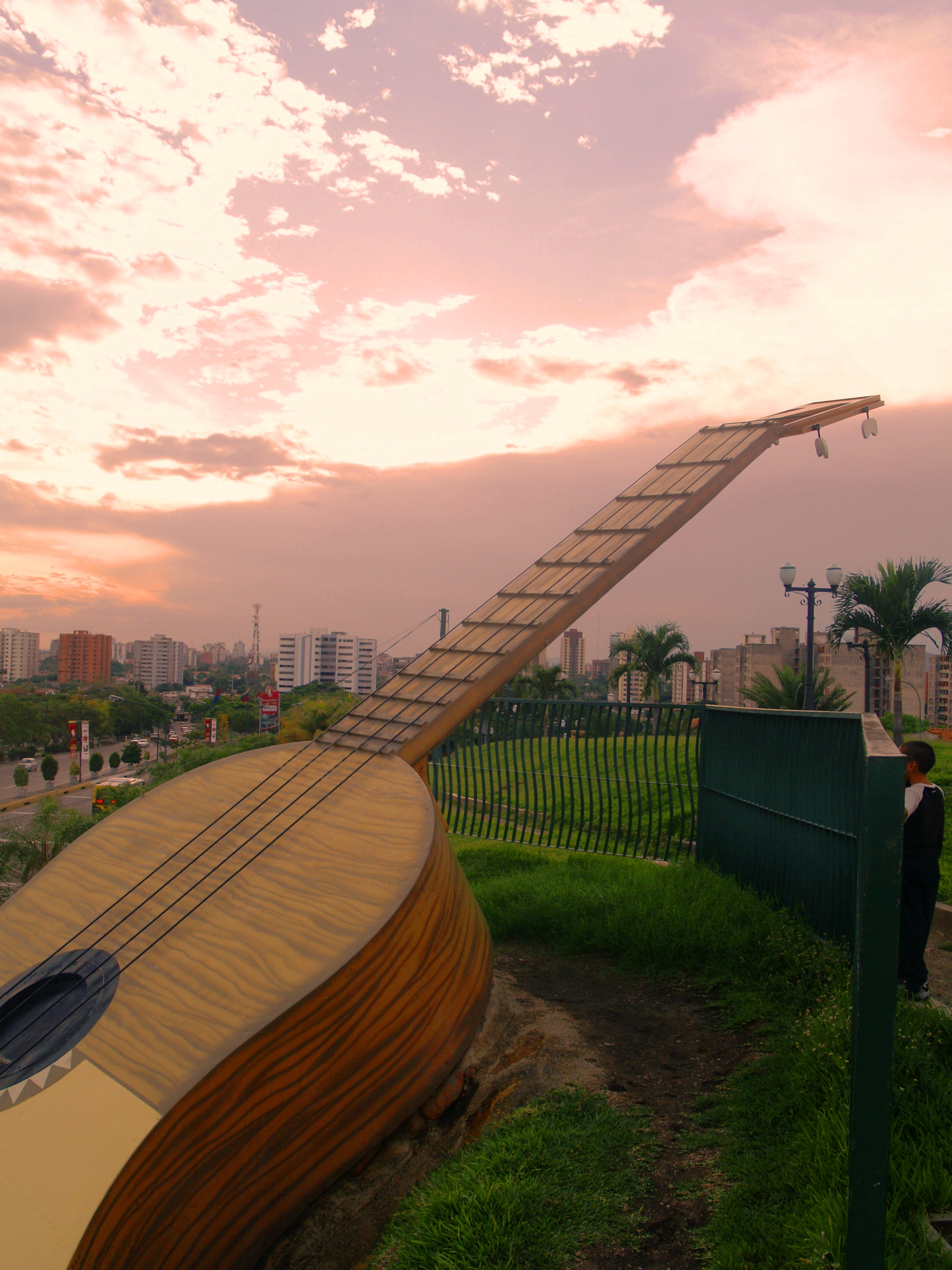
Cuatro of Barquisimeto

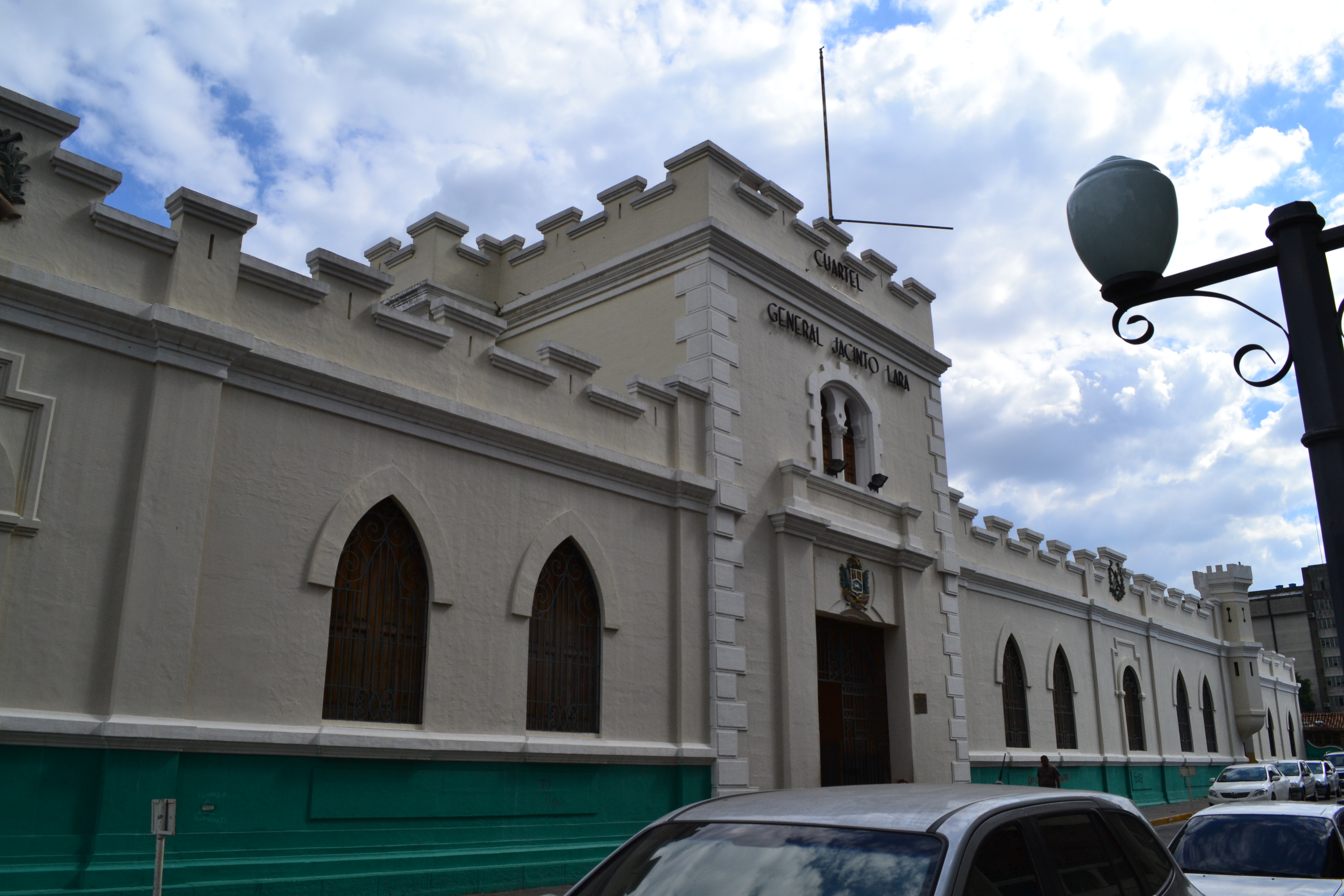
Barracks General Jacinto Lara

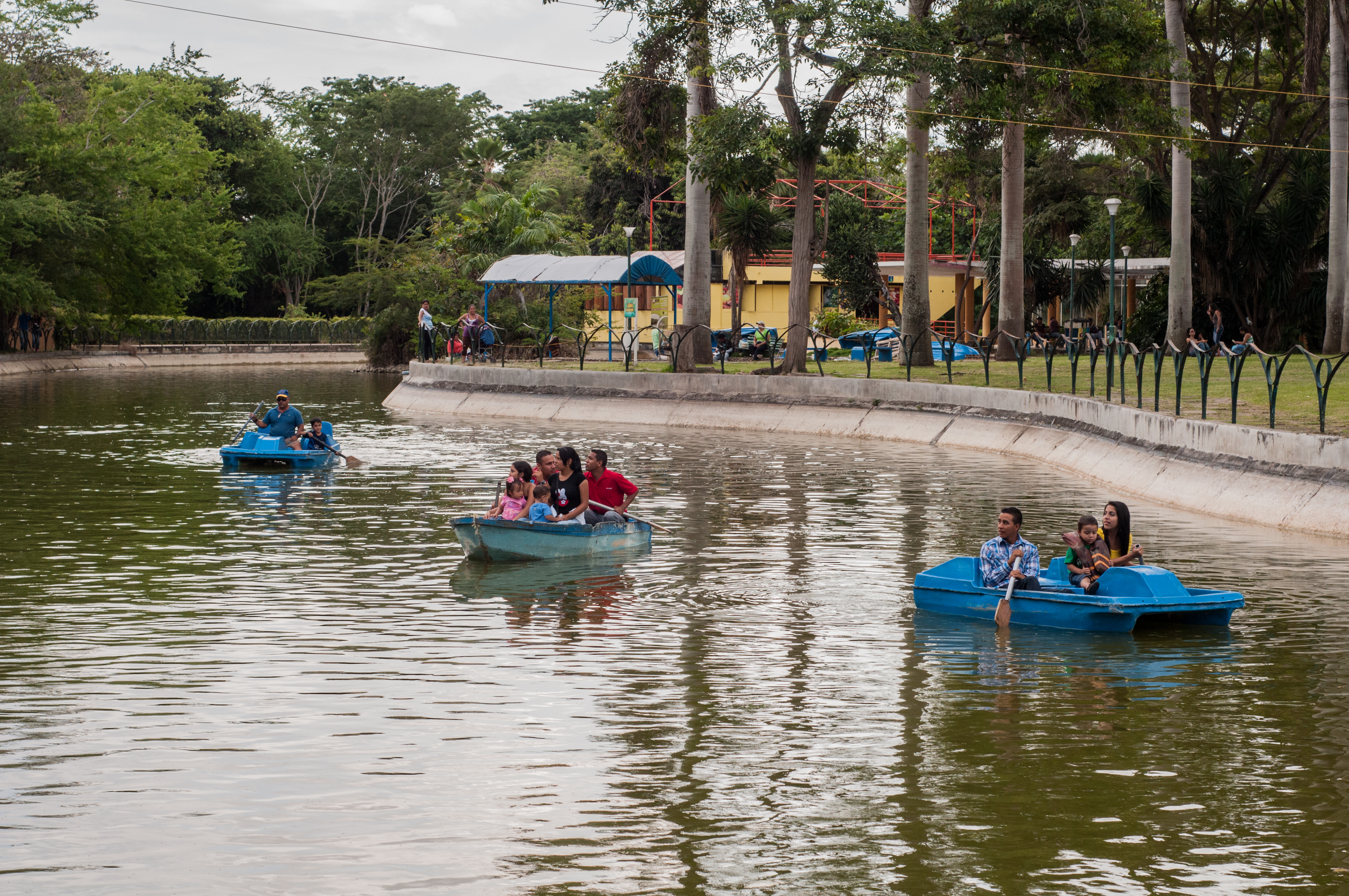
Lagoon in Zoo Park of Barquisimeto

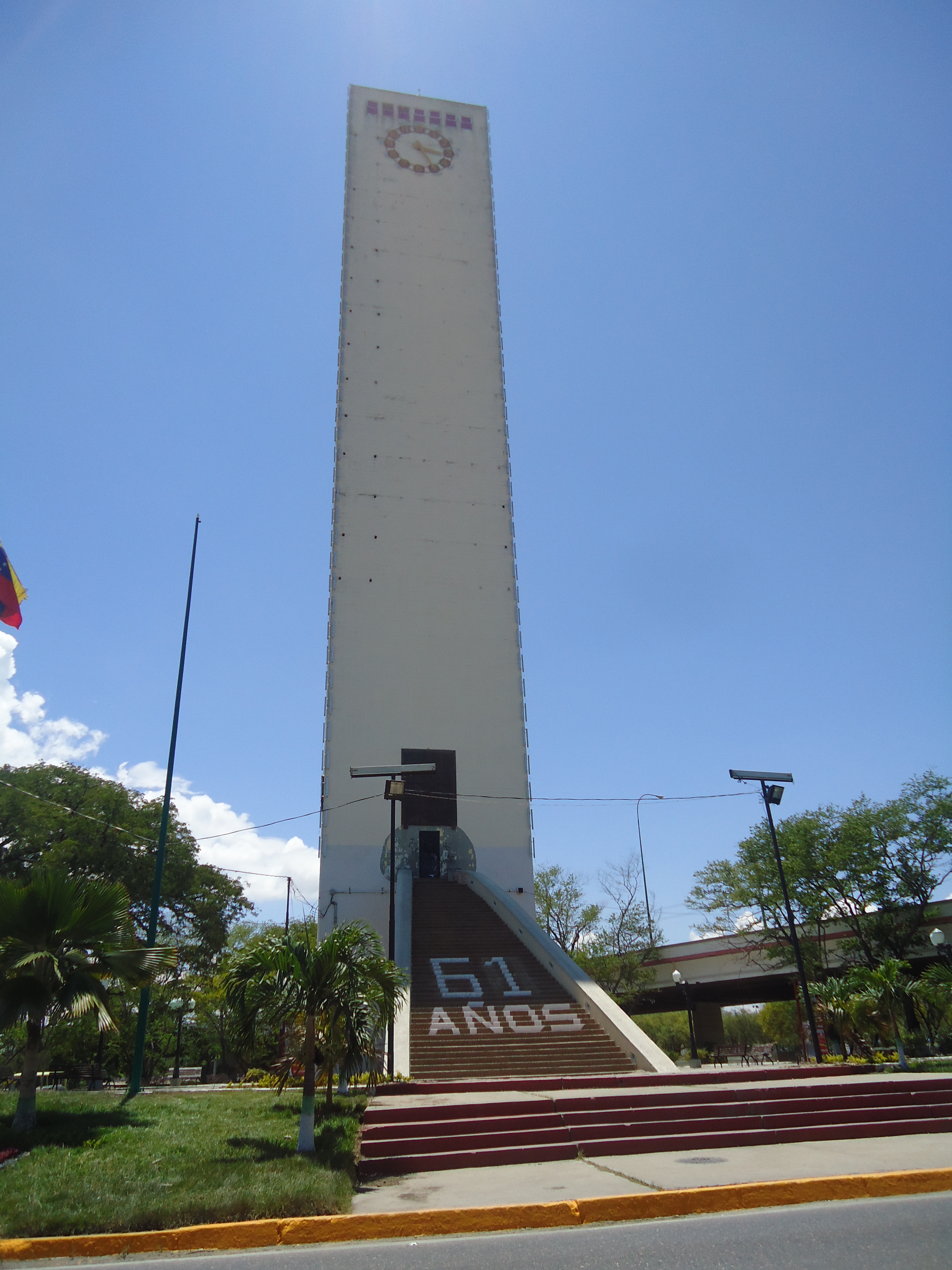
Obelisk of Barquisimeto

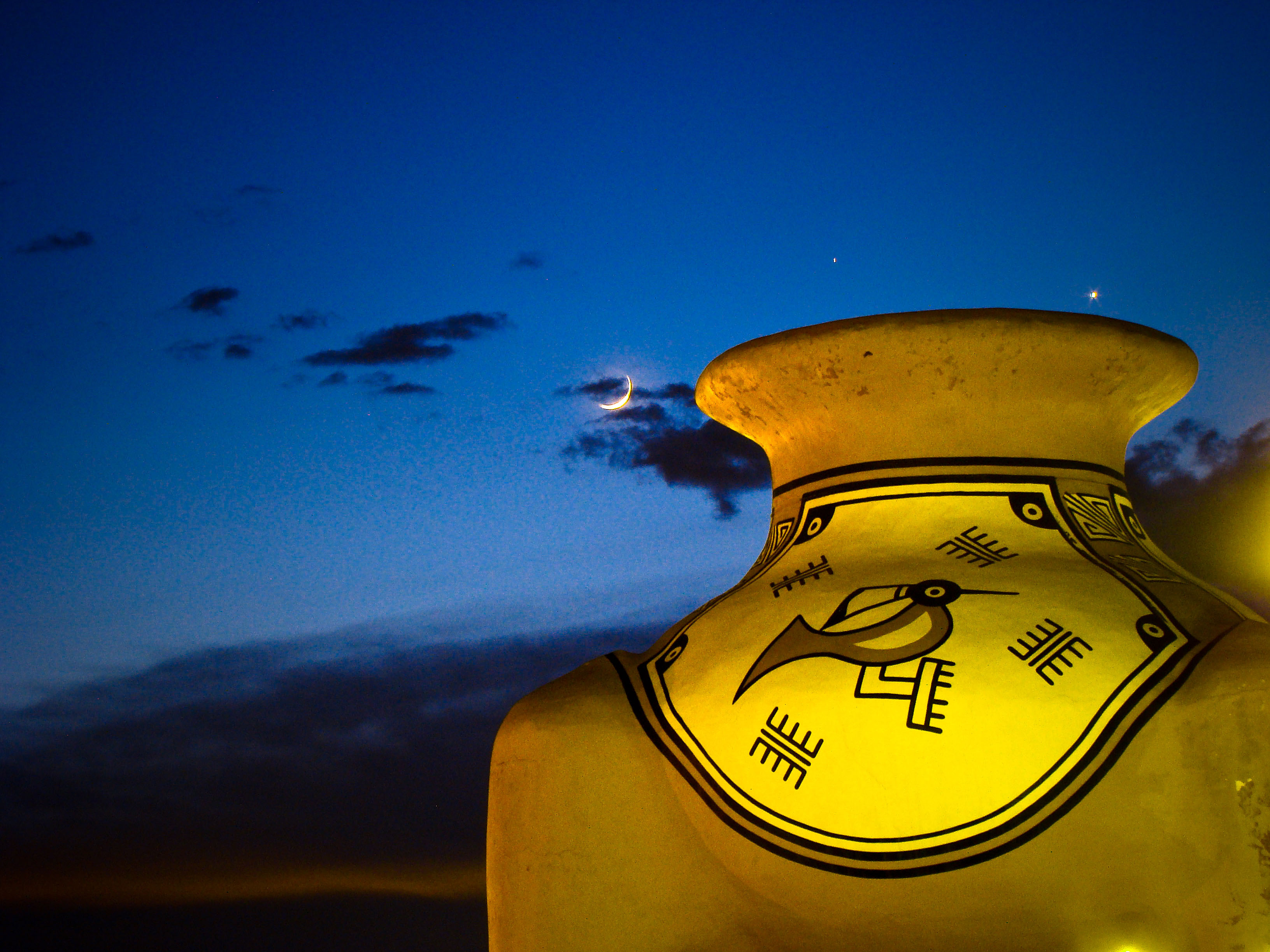
La Tinaja

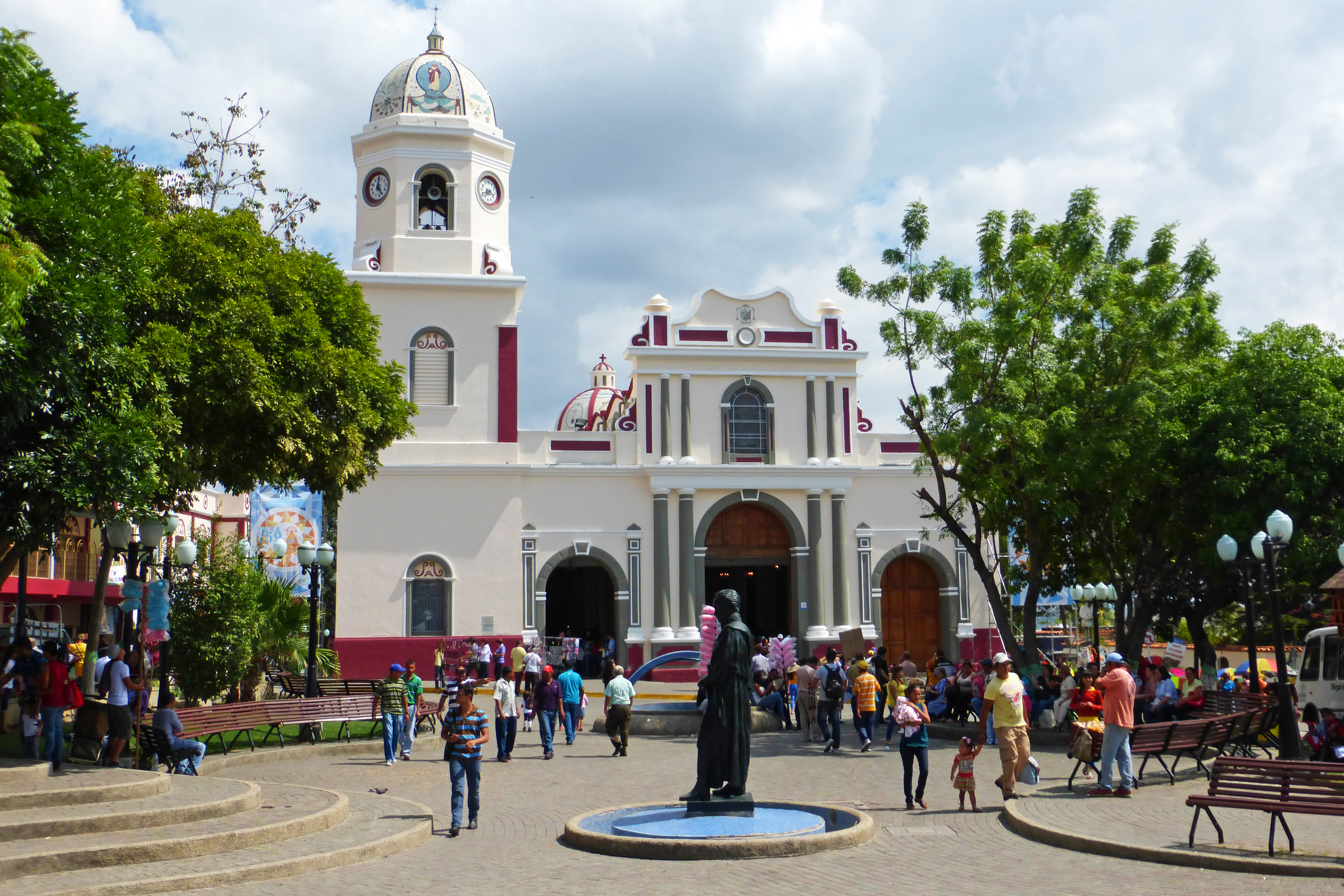
Santa Rosa Church

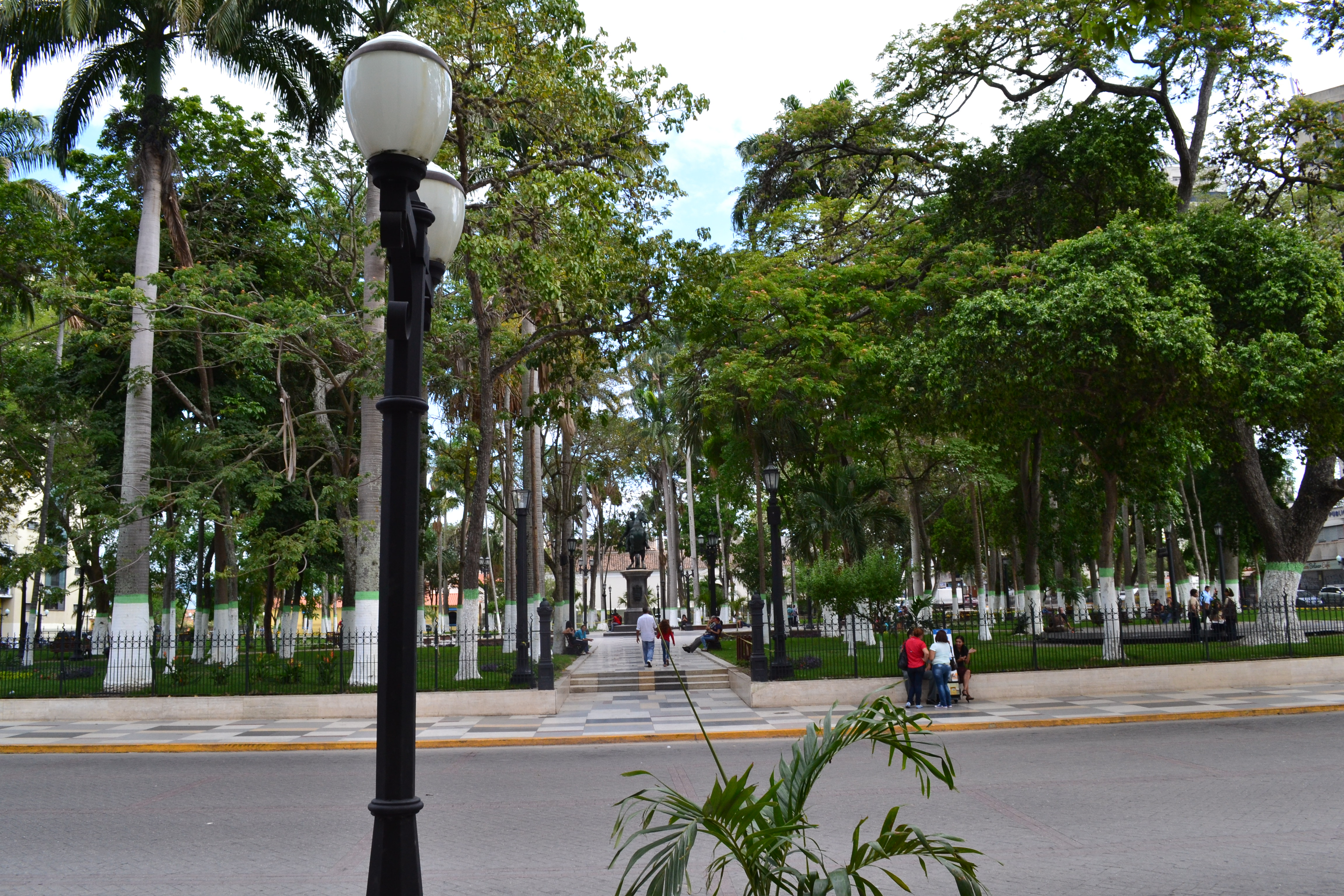
Bolívar Square

== Transportation ==
The Transbarca system is a new "bus rapid transit" (BRT) system under construction, which was originally planned to use trolleybuses. When construction began, in 2006, the system was projected to serve an average of 170,000 people per day when completed, using 80 trolleybuses operating along 30 km (19 mi) of exclusive lanes, across the metropolitan area. Service was planned to include an express route of 22 km (14 mi) along with one local route of 8 km (5 mi). With 52 stations, the BRT system is to include a centralized system of communication and security, and structures for easy access for elderly and disabled people. It is to be complemented with feeder routes, covering the areas of Greater Barquisimeto the BRT line will not serve, which will connect with the main line at terminal stations.

Although 80 articulated trolleybuses were purchased from Neoplan and delivered around 2008–09, the plans to operate the Transbarca system with those vehicles were dropped in 2013. In addition to reasons of cost, an inadequate supply of electricity with which to power the system was cited in the announcement of the decision.

- Buses are the main means of mass transportation. The system runs a variety of bus types, operated by several companies on normal streets and avenues:
- bus; large buses.
- buseta; medium-sized buses.
- microbus or colectivo; vans or minivans.
- rapiditos; old cars with capacity for 5 or more people.

The city has an airport called Jacinto Lara International Airport.

== Sports ==
The city is home to several notable baseball and football teams. Several other sports also have Barquisimeto as their home including Cardenales de Lara (English: Lara Cardinals) (Venezuelan Professional Baseball League), Guaros de Lara (Venezuelan Professional Basketball League), and Lara FC (Venezuelan Professional Soccer League).

== Notable people ==
- Junior Alvarado (born 1986) – Thoroughbred racing jockey
- Rafael Cadenas (born 1930) – poet and essayist, winner of the Cervantes prize in 2022
- Gregorio Camacho (1933-2002) – painter
- Pedro Carmona (born 1941) – economist who served briefly as acting president of Venezuela in 2002
- Carlos Carrasco (born 1987) – Major League Baseball pitcher
- Gabriel Coronel (born 1987) – actor and singer
- Gustavo Dudamel (born 1981) – conductor and violinist
- Antonio Gallardo Lucena, Episcopal bishop
- Andrés Giménez (born 1998) – Major League Baseball player for the Toronto Blue Jays
- Carlos Mendoza (born 1979) – Major League Baseball coach and current manager of the New York Mets
- Amleto Monacelli (born 1961) – professional ten-pin bowler
- Dori Parra de Orellana (1923-2007) – politician
- Gabriel Moreno (born 2000) – Major League Baseball player for the Arizona Diamondbacks
- Manny Piña (born 1987) – Major League Baseball player
- Ana Rugeles (1914-2012) – composer and music educator

== See also ==
- Venezuela
- Lara state
- List of cities in Venezuela
- List of wine-producing regions
- Railway stations in Venezuela
- Gustavo Dudamel
