= Orlando Fernández =

Orlando Fernández or Fernandez may refer to:

- Orlando Fernández Medina (1945–2025), Venezuelan politician, governor of Lara from 1995 to 2000
- Orlando Fernandez (boxer) (born 1963), Puerto Rican boxer
- Orlando Fernández (swimmer) (born 1971), Puerto Rican long-distance swimmer
- Orlando Fernández (musician), Mexican musician, member of Clubz
