= Dori Parra de Orellana =

Venezuelan politician (1923–2007)

Governor of the state of Lara
- In office 1975–1977
- Constituency: State of Lara

Senator of the Congress of Venezuela
- In office 1978–1983
- Constituency: State of Lara

Senator of the Congress of Venezuela
- In office 1968–1973
- Constituency: State of Lara

Legislator Congress of Venezuela
- In office 1947–1948

Representative Iribarren Municipality
- In office 1958–1968

Personal details
- Born: Elena Dorila Parra Pinellaux; July 25, 1923 Barquisimeto, Venezuela
- Died: March 21, 2007 (aged 83) Barquisimeto, Venezuela
- Party: Democratic Action
- Spouses: Miguel Ángel Escalona García (divorced); Fortunato Orellana Anzola
- Children: 1 son
- Education: Andrés Bello Academy
- Known for: First Venezuelan woman to be a state senator and governor

Elena Dorila Parra Pinellaux (Barquisimeto, Venezuela, July 25, 1923 – Barquisimeto, March 21, 2007), better known as Dori Parra de Orellana, was a Venezuelan politician. She was elected as a deputy to the Congress of Venezuela for the Democratic Action party in 1947. After the 1948 coup in Venezuela, Parra joined the fight against the military junta and the Marcos Pérez Jiménez dictatorship, during which she was imprisoned and tortured. With the arrival of democracy in the country, she was elected as a senator for the state of Lara and served as state governor, being the first Venezuelan woman to be a senator and state governor.

== Biography ==
Elena Dorila (nickname, "Dori") Parra Pinellaux was the daughter of Miguel Parra and Dorila Pinellaux González, who in turn was the daughter of the French immigrant Nicholas Pinellaux, a marriage that had nine children. The family lived in a large house on the outskirts of Barquisimeto. In 1932, her mother died at the age of 49, when Parra was nine. She studied high school. Later, she studied commerce at the Academia Diplomática Andrés Bello.

She was elected as a deputy to the National Congress for the Acción Democrática party in December 1947, when she was 25 years old, being the first elections where women could vote and run as candidates. During her legislative period, she stood out for her role in the fight for women's political rights. On November 24, 1948, President Rómulo Gallegos was overthrown by a coup, after which Parra joined the resistance against the de facto government.

On February 12, 1951, she was arrested by the Dirección de Seguridad Nacional "for inciting the students in the Youth Day demonstration in the Plaza Bolívar de Barquisimeto (Plaza Bolívar in Barquisimeto), to strike and disorder." The job assigned to her at the time of her arrest was "Office Worker". Parra was tortured during her detention; she would later declare that her arms were tied to the beams of the ceiling, and she was kept standing for up to 72 hours and forced to witness the torture against her first cousin. Despite her torture, she would later say that she never responded to the interrogations to which she was subjected. Her home was frequently raided and her family was threatened.

With the arrival of democracy in Venezuela in 1958, Parra served as a representative of the Iribarren Municipality between 1958 and 1968, an entity that she came to preside over. She was elected as a senator for the state of Lara in the period 1968–1973 in the National Congress, she served as governor of the state between 1975 and 1977, and was again elected as a senator for the period 1978–1983. She was the first Venezuelan woman to be a state senator and governor.

== Personal life ==
Parra married Miguel Ángel Escalona García when they were both 16 years of age, and with him, she had her only son, Hugo Rafael Escalona Parra. The marriage broke up and she later married the Tocuyano doctor, Fortunato Orellana Anzola.

== See also ==
- List of governors of Lara
- Political prisoners in Venezuela
- Torture in Venezuela
