= Universidad Centroccidental Lisandro Alvarado =

- Universidad Centroccidental Lisandro Alvarado
- Type: Public
- Established: 1962
- Rector: Nelly Velásquez
- Location: Barquisimeto, Venezuela
- Website: www.ucla.edu.ve

The Universidad Centroccidental Lisandro Alvarado (UCLA) is a public university located in Barquisimeto, Venezuela. It was founded in 1962 with the creation of the Centro Experimental de Estudios Superiores (CEDES), and became the Universidad de la Región Centro Occidental in 1967, before being given its current name in 1979.

== History ==
Lisandro Alvarado University was established on September 22 of 1962 by Executive Order No. 845, which provided for the establishment of the Experimental Centre for Advanced Studies (CEDES) as core and first stage of the UCLA during the presidency of Rómulo Betancourt. It starts with three professional schools: medicine (1963), agriculture and veterinary medicine (1964). Several years later included the administration.

In 1967, it was given the name of the Midwestern University (UCO) region, Decree No. 89. This article marks the continuity of teaching and administrative activities corresponding to the Experimental Centre for Advanced Studies (CEDES).

By Decree of the President of the Republic N. 55 dated April 2 of 1979, the Executive decided to rename it to the current Centroccidental University Lisandro Alvarado.

== Colleges ==
- Business Administration
- Accounting
- Agronomy
- Veterinary Science
- Science
- Technology
- Humanities and Arts
- Civil engineering
- Medicine
- Nursing
