= List of governors of Lara =

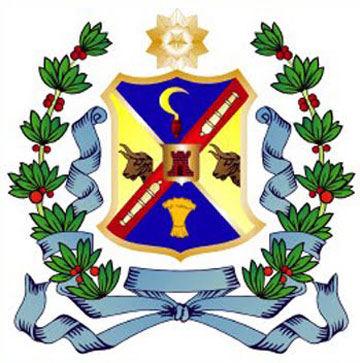
- State coat of arms

- Flag of the State
- Incumbent; Luis Reyes Reyes
- Style: Governor
- Status: Head of State
- Term length: Four years

This is a list of governors of the Venezuelan Lara State:

Until 1989, they were appointed by the president of Venezuela. Starting from that year they are elected in universal, direct and secret elections.

== Designated ==
| Period | Name |
|---|---|
| 1900–1901 | General Juan Bautista Blanco |
| 1901–1902 | General Rafael González Pacheco |
| 1902 | General Juan José Perera |
| 1902 | General Miguel Felipe Bernal Jefe Civil y Militar |
| 1902–1903 | Dr. Leopoldo Torres |
| 1903–1904 | General Manuel Salvador Araujo (Provisional) |
| 1904–1905 | Dr. y General Rafael González Pacheco |
| 1905–1906 | Dr. Leopoldo Torres |
| 1906–1907 | General Santiago Briceño Ayestaran |
| 1907–1909 | General Carlos Liscano |
| 1909–1910 | General Diego Bautista Ferrer |
| 1909–1910 | General Silverio González (Provisional) |
| 1910–1914 | General Manuel Salvador Araujo |
| 1910–1914 | Dr. Rafael Garmendia Rodríguez |
| 1914–1916 | General Diógenes Torrellas Urquiola |
| 1916–1920 | General David Gimon |
| 1920–1925 | General Rafael Maria Velasco Bustamante |
| 1925–1928 | General Pedro Lizarraga |
| 1928–1929 | General Pedro Maria Cárdenas |
| 1929–1935 | General Eustaquio Gomez |
| 1935 | Dr. Carlos Siso (Provisional) |
| 1935–1936 | General Vicencio Pérez Soto |
| 1936 | General José Rafael Gabaldon |
| 1936–1937 | Dr. Honorio Sigala |
| 1937–1938 | Dr. Pablo Gil García |
| 1938–1939 | General Lino Diaz |
| 1939–1941 | Dr. Honorio Sigala |
| 1941–1942 | Dr. Pedro Nolasco Pereira |
| 1942–1943 | León Jurado |
| 1943–1945 | General José Antonio González |
| 1945 | Dr. José Maria Domínguez Escobar |
| 1945 | Dr. José Rafael Gabaldon |
| 1945 | Dr. Pedro Adrián Santeliz |
| 1945–1948 | Dr. Eligio Anzola Anzola |
| 1948 | Dr. Rafael Rodríguez Méndez |
| 1948–1949 | Mayor Santiago Ochoa Briceño |
| 1949–1952 | Dr. Carlos Felice cardot |
| 1952 | Dr. Esteban Agudo Freitez |
| 1952–1958 | Cmdte. Carlos Morales |
| 1958 | Cmdte. Ásael Rojas |
| 1958 | Dr. Froilan Álvarez Yépez |
| 1958–1959 | Dr. Anselmo Riera Zubillaga |
| 1959–1963 | Dr. Eligio Anzola Anzola |
| 1963–1964 | Dr. Argimiro Bracamonte |
| 1964–1968 | Miguel Romero Antoni |
| 1968–1969 | Said Padua Coronel |
| 1969–1973 | Rafael Andrés Montes de Oca |
| 1973–1974 | Dr. Nelson Dávila aguilera |
| 1974–1975 | Ing. Hernán Rodríguez Araujo |
| 1975–1977 | Dori Parra de Orellana |
| 1978–1979 | Dr. Domingo Perera Riera |
| 1979–1982 | Dr. Carlos Zapata Escalona |
| 1982–1983 | Dr. Ibrahin Sánchez Gallardo |
| 1983–1984 | Dr. Enuman Suárez |
| 1985–1986 | Dr. Domingo Perera Riera |
| 1986–1988 | Dr. Guillermo luna |
| 1988–1989 | Dr. Elias Salir Saap |
| 2020–2025 | Adolfo Pereira Antique |

== Elected governors ==
| Took office | Left office | Governor | Vote |
|---|---|---|---|
| 1989 | 1992 | José Mariano Navarro, Democratic Action | 40.32 |
| 1992 | 1994 | José Mariano Navarro, Democratic Action | 35.79 |
| 1994 | 1995 | José Mariano Navarro, Democratic Action | 49.61 |
| 1995 | 1998 | Orlando Fernández Medina, MAS | 50.36 |
| 1998 | 2000 | Orlando Fernández Medina, MAS | 53.53 |
| 2000 | 2004 | Luis Reyes Reyes, MVR | 62.07 |
| 2004 | 2008 | Luis Reyes Reyes, MVR | 73.56 |
| 2008 | 2012 | Henri Falcón, PPT | 73.15 |
| 2012 | 2017 | Henri Falcón, Progressive Outpost | 53.87 |
| 2017 | 2020 | Carmen Meléndez, PSUV | 57,61 |
| 2020 | 2025 | Adolfo Pereira Antique, PSUV | N/A |
| 2025 | 2029 | Luis Reyes Reyes, GPPSB | 90,95 % |

== See also ==
- List of Venezuela governors
- Politics of Venezuela
- History of Venezuela
