= Jiménez Municipality, Lara =

Jiménez Municipality Municipio Jiménez
- Municipality
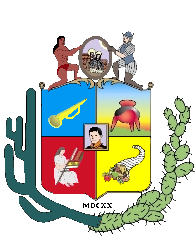
- Flag Coat of arms

- Location in Lara

- Location in Venezuela
- Coordinates: 9°55′53″N 69°36′26″W
- Country: Venezuela
- State: Lara
- Municipal seat: Quíbor

Government
  - Mayor: Carmen Silva López (PSUV)

Area
  - Total: 848.4 km^{2} (327.6 sq mi)

Population (2011)
  - Total: 110,536
  - Density: 130.3/km^{2} (337.4/sq mi)
- Time zone: UTC−4 (VET)
- Area code(s): 0253
- Website: Official website

The Jiménez Municipality is one of the nine municipalities (municipios) that makes up the Venezuelan state of Lara and, according to a 2007 population estimate by the National Institute of Statistics of Venezuela, the municipality has a population of 97,524. The town of Quíbor is the shire town of the Jiménez Municipality.

== Demographics ==
The Jiménez Municipality, according to a 2011 population estimate by the National Institute of Statistics of Venezuela, has a population of 100,997 (up from 97,524 in 2007). This amounts to 5.6% of the state's population. The municipality's population density is 126.98 inhabitants per square kilometre (328.9/sq mi).

== Government ==
The mayor of the Jiménez Municipality is Luis Alberto Plaza Paz, elected on October 31, 2004, with 73% of the vote. He replaced Manuel Diaz shortly after the elections. The municipality is divided into eight parishes; Juan Bautista Rodríguez, Cuara, Diego de Lozada, Paraíso de San José, San Miguel, Tintorero, José Bernardo Dorante, and Coronel.

== See also ==
- Quíbor
- Lara
- Municipalities of Venezuela
