= Quíbor =

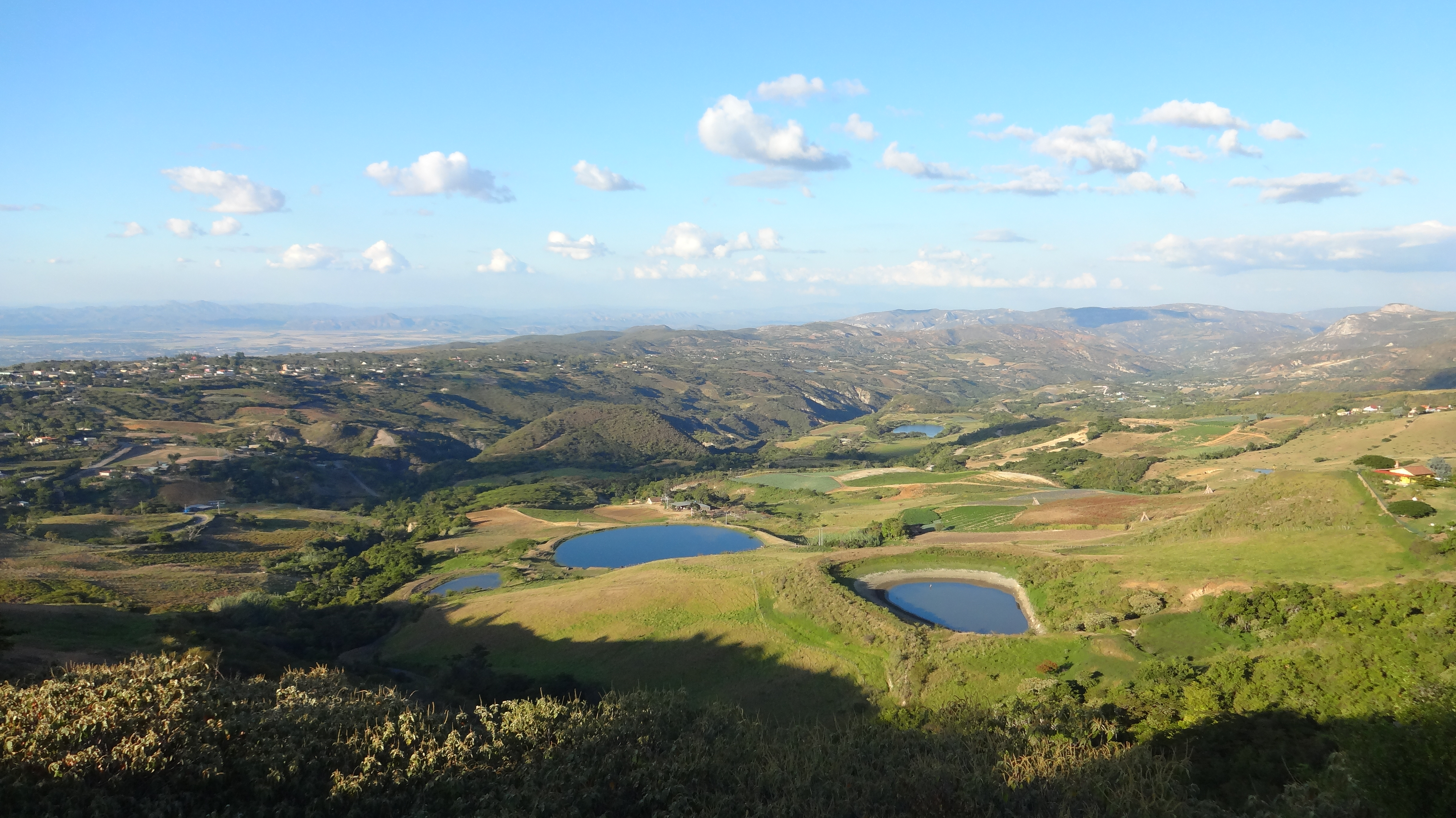

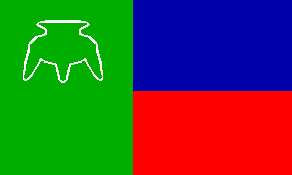
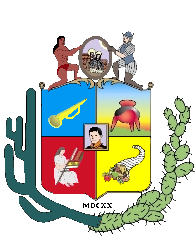
- Flag Coat of arms

- Location within Venezuela
- Coordinates: 09°55′52″N 69°37′29″W
- Country: Venezuela
- State: Lara
- Founded: 1620

Population (2007)
  - Total: 70,536
  - Demonym: Quiboreno
- Time zone: UTC-4:30 (VST)
  - Summer (DST): UTC-4:30 (not observed)
- Postal code: 3061
- Area code: 0253
- Climate: BSh

Quíbor [ˈkiβoɾ] is a city in the state of Lara, Venezuela. It has 70,536 inhabitants.

== History ==
The region was inhabited well before the Europeans arrived. The first European record about the region dates back to 1545, when López Montalvo de Lugo, under order of governor Jorge de la Espira, arrived in the valley of Quíbor.

Venezuela's Captain General Francisco de la Hoz Berríos ordered the official foundation of Quíbor in June 1620, even if there was already a native American village there. The centre got as official name Nuestra Señora de Altagracia de Quíbor.
