= Iribarren Municipality =

Iribarren Municipality Municipio Iribarren
- Municipality
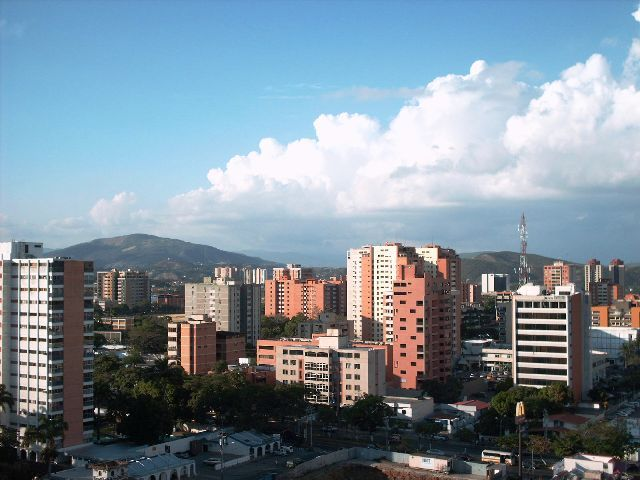
- Buildings of Barquisimeto

- Flag Coat of arms

- Location in Lara

- Location in Venezuela
- Coordinates: 10°08′07″N 69°23′38″W
- Country: Venezuela
- State: Lara
- Municipal seat: Barquisimeto

Government
  - Mayor: Yanys Aguero PSUV

Area
  - Total: 2,733.9 km^{2} (1,055.6 sq mi)

Population (2007)
  - Total: 1,027,022
  - Density: 375.66/km^{2} (972.96/sq mi)
- Time zone: UTC−4 (VET)
- Area code(s): 0251
- Website: Official website

The Iribarren Municipality is one of the nine municipalities (municipios) that make up the Venezuelan state of Lara and, according to a 2007 population estimate by the National Institute of Statistics of Venezuela, the municipality has a population of 1,027,022. The City of Barquisimeto is the shire town of the Iribarren Municipality.

== Demographics ==
The Iribarren Municipality, according to a 2011 population census by the National Institute of Statistics of Venezuela, has a population of 996,230 (up from 915,634 in 2000). This amounts to 56% of the state's population. The municipality's population density is 372.11 inhabitants per square kilometre (963.8/sq mi).

== Government ==
The mayor of the Iribarren Municipality is Alfredo Ramos, elected on December 8, 2013. The municipality is divided into 10 parishes; Catedral, Concepción, El Cují, Juan de Villegas, Santa Rosa, Tamaca, Unión, Aguedo Felipe Alvarado, Buena Vista, and Juárez.
