= Gregorio Camacho =

Venezuelan painter

Gregorio Camacho (1933–2002) was a Venezuelan painter.
