= Orlando Fernández Medina =

Venezuelan politician (1945–2025)

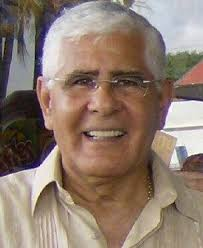

Governor of Lara
- In office 11 December 1995 – 18 August 2000
- Preceded by: José Mariano Navarro
- Succeeded by: Luis Reyes Reyes

Personal details
- Born: Orlando José Fernández Medina; 4 January 1945 Yaritagua, Yaracuy, Venezuela
- Died: 15 October 2025 (aged 80) Yaritagua, Yaracuy, Venezuela
- Political party: MAS; OFM; UNT
- Occupation: Journalist

Orlando José Fernández Medina (Note: In this Spanish name, the first or paternal surname is Fernández and the second or maternal family name is Medina.) (4 January 1945 – 15 October 2025) was a Venezuelan journalist and politician. A member of the Movement for Socialism, he served as governor of Lara from 1995 to 2000.

Initially aligned with Hugo Chávez, whom he supported in the 1998 and 2000 presidential elections, he distanced himself following Chávez's re-election.

Fernández died from complications of surgery in Yaritagua, Yaracuy, on 15 October 2025, at the age of 80. The operation had intended to remove a tumor from his colon.
