= Langdon (surname) =

Langdon is an surname of English origin. It originates as a toponymic surname from any of various places called "Langdon" or similar in England, such as in the counties of Devon, Dorset, Essex, or Kent. The name ultimately derives from the Old English lang, meaning "long"; and dun, meaning "hill". Notable people with the surname include:

- Charles C. Langdon, American politician
- Chauncey Langdon (1763–1830), American politician, lawyer and judge
- Craig Langdon (born 1957), Australian politician
- Darren Langdon (born 1971), Canadian former National Hockey League player
- David Langdon (1914–2011), English cartoonist
- Elisha Bassett Langdon (1827–1867), American brevet brigadier general and Ohio state representative
- Emma F. Langdon (1875–1937), American union activist
- Genevieve Langdon, British explosives expert
- George C. Langdon (1833–1909), mayor of Detroit (1878-1879)
- Harry Langdon (1884–1944), American comedian and silent-movie actor
- Harry Langdon Jr. (born 1934), American photographer and son of above
- Jeffrey Langdon (born 1975), Canadian figure skater
- Joan Langdon (1922–2022), Canadian competitive swimmer and breaststroke
- John Langdon (disambiguation)
- Julia Langdon (born c. 1946), British journalist, newspaper political editor and writer
- Lillian Langdon (1860–1943), American film actress of the silent era
- Margaret Langdon (died 2005), linguist
- Mary Joy Langdon (born 1951), British nun
- Michael Langdon (1920–1991), British bass singer
- Oliver Langdon, Canadian educator and former politician
- Olivia Langdon Clemens (1845–1904), wife of American writer and humorist Samuel Clemens (Mark Twain), maiden name Langdon
- Reuben Langdon, American actor and stuntman
- Richard Langdon (1729–1803), British cathedral organist
- Royston Langdon (born 1972), lead singer and bassist of the British glam rock band Spacehog
- Samuel Langdon (1723–1797), American Congregational clergyman, educator and president of Harvard University
- Shawn Langdon, American drag racer and winner of the 2013 NHRA Top Fuel championship
- Stephen Herbert Langdon (1876–1937), American-born British Assyriologist
- Steven W. Langdon (born 1946), Canadian politician and economist
- Steve J. Langdon (born 1948), American anthropologist
- Steve Langdon (hockey player) (born 1953), Canadian former ice-hockey player
- Sue Ane Langdon (born 1936), American actress
- Thomas Langdon (cricketer) (1879–1944), English cricketer
- Thomas Langdon (MP) for Canterbury (UK Parliament constituency)
- Tom Langdon (born 1994), Australian rules football player
- Trajan Langdon (born 1976), American retired basketball player
- Verne Langdon (1941–2011), American mask maker, musician, magician, circus clown, make-up artist, and wrestler
- William Chauncy Langdon (1831–1895), American minister important in early history of American YMCA
- William Chauncy Langdon (1871-1947), American historian and writer of historical pageants
- Woodbury Langdon (1739–1805), American merchant, statesman, and justice

Fictional characters:

- Robert Langdon, fictional character created by author Dan Brown
- Dr. Frank Langdon, fictional Emergency Medicine Doctor in the HBO medical drama The Pitt
- Tate Langdon (born 1977), fictional serial killer in the American Horror Story TV series
- Michael Langdon, the antichrist in the American Horror Story TV series
