= Jeffery Rowthorn =

British Anglican bishop and hymnographer (1934–2025)

The Right Reverend Jeffery Rowthorn
- Bishop in Charge
- Church: Episcopal Church
- Province: Province II
- Diocese: Convocation of Episcopal Churches in Europe
- Appointed: 1 January 1994
- In office: 1994–2001
- Predecessor: Matthew P. Bigliardi
- Successor: Pierre Whalon
- Previous post: Suffragan Bishop of Connecticut (1987–1993)

Orders
- Ordination: 30 September 1962 (deacon); 29 September 1963 (priest) by Mervyn Stockwood
- Consecration: 19 September 1987 by Edmond L. Browning

Personal details
- Born: 9 April 1934 Newport, Wales
- Died: 23 July 2025 (aged 91) Bloomfield, Connecticut, U.S.
- Denomination: Anglican
- Spouse: Anne Long Wheeler
- Education: Christ's College, Cambridge; Union Theological Seminary; Oriel College, Oxford; Berkeley Divinity School

Jeffery William Rowthorn (also spelled Jeffrey; 9 April 1934 – 23 July 2025) was an Anglican bishop and hymnographer primarily active in the Episcopal Church in the United States. His early career was spent in parish ministry in the Diocese of Southwark and the Diocese of Oxford of the Church of England. He then moved to the United States where he worked at two seminaries: Union Theological Seminary in New York City, and Berkeley Divinity School in New Haven, Connecticut. He was elected a bishop in the Episcopal Church, serving as a suffragan bishop of the Episcopal Diocese of Connecticut from 1987 to 1994, and as Bishop in Charge of the Convocation of Episcopal Churches in Europe from 1994 to 2001.

== Early life and education ==
Rowthorn was born on 9 April 1934 in Newport, Monmouthshire, Wales. From 1952 to 1954, he served in the Royal Navy as part of National Service. During this time, he studied Russian at the University of London.

He then studied modern languages (Russian, German, Persian and Arabic) at Christ's College, Cambridge, and graduated from the University of Cambridge with a Bachelor of Arts (BA) degree in 1957; as per tradition, the BA was promoted to a Master of Arts (MA (Cantab)) degree in 1962. Having been awarded a Rotary Foundation Fellowship, he studied at the Union Theological Seminary, a Christian seminary in New York City, United States. He graduated with a magna cum laude Bachelor of Divinity (BD) degree in 1961. In 1961, he returned to the United Kingdom and entered Cuddesdon College, an Anglican theological college, to undertake one year of training for ordination.

He later undertook postgraduate study while a priest and academic. He completed a Bachelor of Letters (BLitt) degree at Oriel College, Oxford in 1972 and was awarded a Doctor of Divinity (DD) degree by Berkeley Divinity School in 1987.

== Ordained ministry ==
Rowthorn was ordained in the Church of England as a deacon on 30 September 1962 and as a priest on 29 September 1963, both times by Mervyn Stockwood, then the Bishop of Southwark. From 1962 to 1965, he served his curacy at St Mary Magdalene, Woolwich in the Diocese of Southwark. From 1965 to 1968, he was Rector of the Benefice of Garsington in the Diocese of Oxford. During this time in parish ministry, he was also a lecturer at Cuddesdon College, a theological college in Oxford.

In 1968, he moved to the United States. He then joined the Union Theological Seminary, New York City, as Chaplain and Dean of the seminary's new Master of Divinity ministerial training program. In 1973, he joined Yale University as an associate professor at Berkeley Divinity School and the newly created Yale Institute of Sacred Music. He taught pastoral theology and liturgics and was a founding member of the North American Academy of Liturgy.

=== Episcopal ministry ===
In May 1987, Rowthorn was elected a suffragan bishop by the Diocese of Connecticut. He was consecrated as a bishop on 19 September 1987 by Edmond L. Browning, the then Presiding Bishop of the Episcopal Church in the United States of America. The co-consecrators were Arthur E. Walmsley and Adrian Delio Caceres-Villavicencio. As one of two suffragan bishops, he had oversight over the eastern half of Connecticut. In 1993, he stood for election as Bishop of the Episcopal Diocese of Connecticut but was unsuccessful.

On 1 January 1994, he was appointed Bishop in Charge of the Convocation of Episcopal Churches in Europe (the jurisdiction of the Episcopal Church that covers Continental Europe). In April 1994, he was installed at the American Cathedral in Paris in Paris, France. From 1995 to 2001, he was additionally an assistant bishop of the Church of England's Diocese in Europe. He retired at the end of 2001.

Rowthorn died in Bloomfield, Connecticut on 23 July 2025, at the age of 91.

== See also ==
- List of bishops of the Episcopal Church in the United States of America

Episcopal Church (USA) titles
Preceded by Matthew P. Bigliardi	Bishop in Charge of the Convocation of Episcopal Churches in Europe; 1994–2001	Succeeded by Pierre Whalon
Preceded by Clarence Coleridge	Suffragan Bishop of Connecticut; 1987–1993	Vacant Title next held by Andrew Smith
