= Emmanuel Episcopal Church (Geneva) =

- formerly: The American Church
- Front of the church

- The location of Emmanuel Church
- 46°12′35.45″N 6°8′59.71″E
- Country: Switzerland
- Denomination: Episcopal
- Website: www.emmanuelchurch.ch

History
- Founded: 1877
- Consecrated: 1878

Architecture
- Architect(s): M. F. Gindroz (church); E. Fatio (parish house)
- Completed: 1878, 1930

Administration
- Diocese: Convocation of Episcopal Churches in Europe

Clergy
- Rector: Michael F. Rusk; Lisa Faber Ginggen (assoc.)

Emmanuel Episcopal Church, located in Geneva, Switzerland, is an English speaking Episcopal parish of the Convocation of Episcopal Churches in Europe, and a member of the Anglican Communion. The church has previously been known as "The American Church" (and informally as "The American Chapel"), but this designation was abandoned in 1977 in the light of the decreasing American participation in the congregation. In December 1924 the church was established as a charitable foundation under Swiss law: La Fondation de la Chappelle d'Emmanuel.

== Early history ==
In 1872 a multi-denominational group of Americans requested support from the Episcopal Church of the USA to found a church in Geneva. This was denied and the group independently founded a "Union" church that year.

In 1873 the Episcopal Church did send Rev. William Chauncy Langdon to found a church in Geneva. The first service of the new church was held in the Temple de la Fusterie on 28 July 1873, and in August Bishop William Croswell Doane presided at a meeting where the church received the name "Emmanuel" and a Vestry was elected.

A period of friction between the two churches came to an end when they were merged in June 1875. The merger agreement included the provision " . . the combined church . . could drop the Emmanuel name". Press reports at the times of the opening and consecration of the building (1878) refer most frequently to "the American Episcopal Church".

== Building ==
Memorial of the Construction and Consecration of the church

In 1876 The Emmanuel Chapel Company was formed for the construction of a church; MM Barbey, Bates, Delavin, Collins and Marcelin being the administrators. The foundation stone of the building was laid on 27 July 1877 by former American President Ulysses S. Grant on land donated by Henry I. Barbey, on what was then the Rue des Voirons. The first service took place in the church on Easter Sunday, 21 April 1878, in the presence of the American Consul and Vice-Consul. The building was consecrated on 24 August 1878 by Bishop Littlejohn of Long Island.

The church building stands on land reclaimed from the lake in the early 18th century. It lies on a roughly South-West to North-East axis, due to the constraints of its surroundings.

An extension, the Parish House, was designed by Edmond Fatio (biography in French Edmond Fatio) and opened in November 1930. It is attached to the "East" end of the church, and contains the Parish Halls, offices and the Library in English (formerly the "American Library") opening onto the Rue de Monthoux. In 1976 the Parish House suffered damage from subsidence caused by the excavation for a new hotel nearby.

The current organ, by Hans Füglister, was dedicated on 23 June 1991.

== Windows ==
The first of the windows was ordered from London and installed in May 1882. The windows are subject to a preservation order. The window above the altar (the "East" window) was originally illuminated by natural light, but the construction of the Parish House required it to be lit from behind with artificial light. It is exceptional in that it depicts both Christ in Glory and Jesus as a baby; a window in Genoa is the only other known in Europe.

The stained glass in the Parish Hall (petite salle) is by R. Béguin from 1993.

The Altar or "East" Window

"North" side windows:

N1

N2

N3

N4

N5

"South" side windows:

S1

S2

S3

S4

S5

S1 is signed: G.Jourdin, Peintre-Verrier, Acacias, Genève

== Community ==
The community of Emmanuel reflects the diversity of the city of Geneva and the belief "God loves you. No exceptions". The church serves the "Greater Geneva Area", which includes the Canton of Geneva, near-by parts of the Canton of Vaud and neighbouring France. The 2016 Parish Survey indicated that 45% of parishioners come from the United States and 61% consider English to be their native tongue. However over 20 different languages are spoken, and 57% of parishioners described themselves as fluent in three or more. French is spoken by 87% of the community.

The diversity of religious backgrounds includes Episcopalian 24%, Roman Catholic 20%, with a mixture of Anglican and other Protestant traditions contributing 45%. People with non-Christian backgrounds are also included in the community. In 1973 Philip Potter Secretary General of the World Council of Churches wrote "Emmanuel Church has its place in history as a pioneer of the ecumenical movement".

Church services are conducted predominantly in English, with a few bilingual English/French services each year, often with the Old Catholic congregation of St Germain (description in French St Germain). Sunday services take place at 8:30 (Holy Eucharist) and at 10:30 with music (Holy Eucharist or Morning Prayer).

The size of the congregation, being composed mainly of expatriates, has varied greatly over the years with changes in the political and economic climate. The church almost ceased to function during the periods of the two World Wars, but had a total Sunday congregation of over 300 in 1960.

In response to the COVID-19 pandemic, the building was closed for public services for three periods between March 2020 and March 2021, a total of more than six months. Services were available online, and continue to be so. The monthly ministry to those in need at "Jardin de Montbrillant", the local Soup kitchen, was suspended in March 2020, though financial contributions continued, and was resumed in the summer of 2022. As many as 300 people may be fed, many of them refugees.

Following the outbreak of war in Ukraine, a Refugee Welcome Centre was established to partially meet the needs of these people. Social activities, English and French language classes, and Yoga for women are provided. These services are free to refugees of any origin.

== Personalities ==
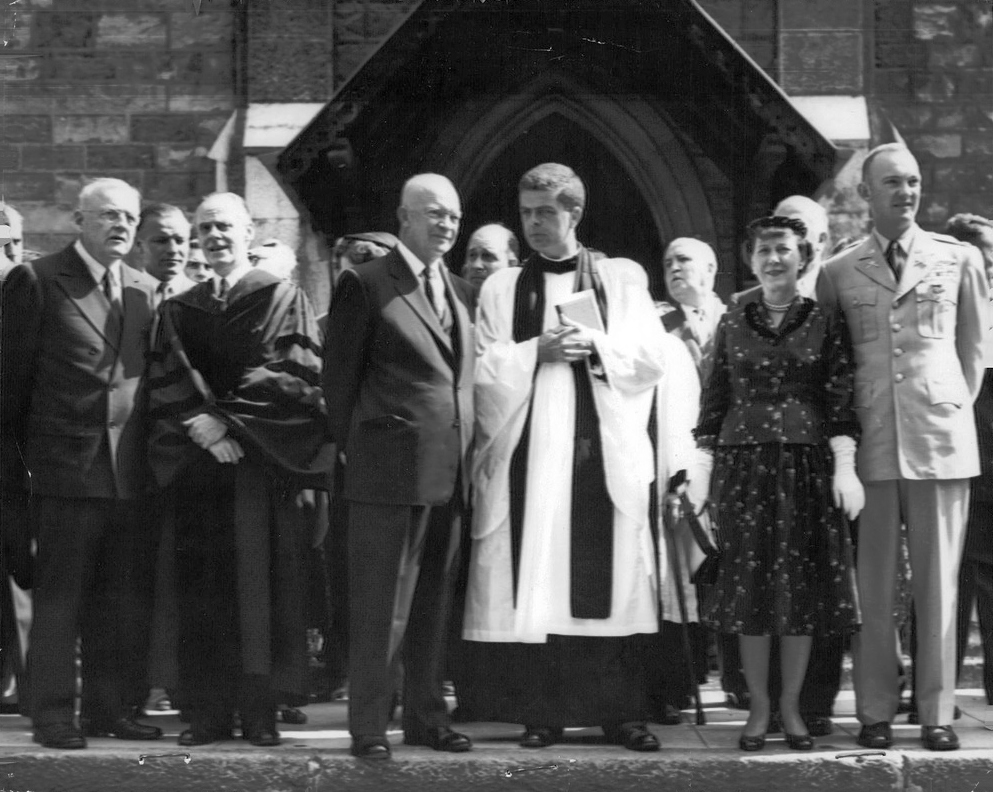
Secretary of State Dulles, president Eisenhower, his wife Mamie and their son John outside the church during their visit in 1955.

Henry I. Barbey (1832–1906), husband of Mary Lorillard Barbey, was originally a member of the "Union" Church and then a member of the Emmanuel Vestry for 31 years. He donated the land for the construction of the church building, and partially financed its construction and running during the early years. A window on the "North" side (N2) is dedicated to him. He was the uncle of Edmond Fatio, architect of the Parish House.

James T. Bates, creator of the daily newspaper Tribune de Genève, was a founding member of the church and a member of the Vestry for 38 years. A window on the "North" side (N5) is dedicated to him.

Rev. William Chauncy Langdon, the first rector, had previously founded "Grace Church" in Rome (later renamed St. Paul's Within the Walls) in 1859, and St James's in Florence, in about 1870. He and George Washington Holland (commemorated in the "South" side window, S1) were two of the co-founders of the YMCA.

Rev. Canon Nicolas T. Porter (Rector 2000–2005) and his wife Dorothy were the founders of Jerusalem Peacebuilders

Other window dedications:

N1: Martha B. Wheaton, July 6th 1879
N3: Elizabeth Alvina Hyde, 1814-1886 - This window is given in loving memory of Elizabeth Alvina Hyde by her son Clarence Melville Hyde A.D. 1895
N4: Margarita Alden Parks, 3rd January 1854 - 25th February 1888

S2: In memory of Alfred Bowne Scott, Feb.1.1846 - Jan.8.1904
S3: Mary Norwood Howell
S4: Jane E. Vail, 1848-1934
S5: Charles M. Belden, Rector: 1902-1919

Visiting worshippers have included President Dwight D. Eisenhower, and the civil rights activist Andrew Young.
