= Church of St Augustine of Canterbury, Wiesbaden =

Gothic Revival church in Germany

The English Church at Wiesbaden
- Church of St Augustine of Canterbury
- Die Englische Kirche in Wiesbaden
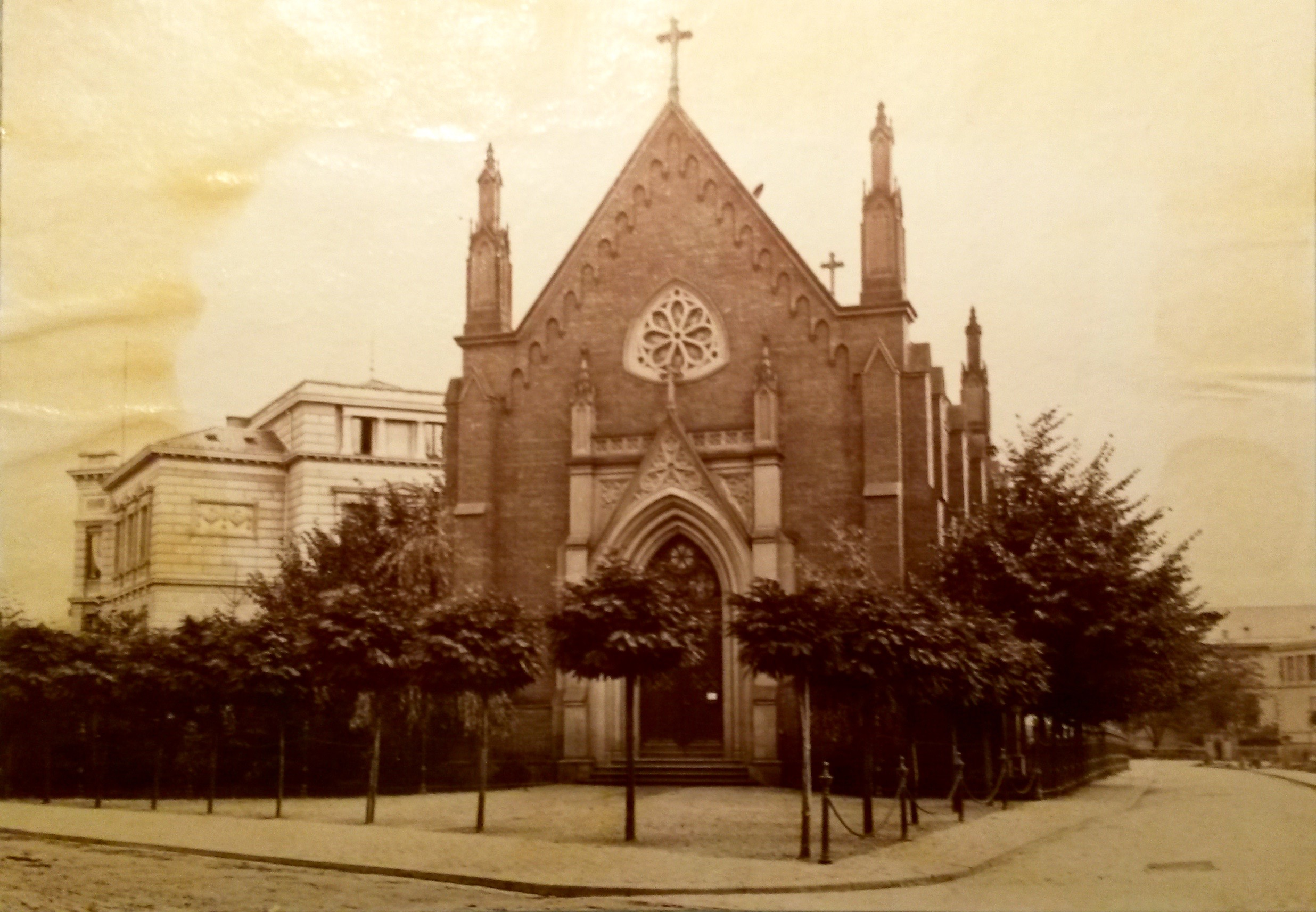
- English Church, from an old photograph.
- The English Church at Wiesbaden
- 50°4′48″N 8°14′46″E
- Location: Wiesbaden
- Country: Germany
- Language: English
- Denomination: Episcopal Church
- Previous denomination: Church of England
- Website: staugustines.de

History
- Status: Parish church
- Founded: 1 November 1864
- Dedication: St Augustine of Canterbury
- Consecrated: 1865

Architecture
- Functional status: Active
- Heritage designation: Hessian cultural monument
- Architect(s): Theodor Goetz, Friedrich Lang
- Style: Gothic Revival
- Groundbreaking: 3 June 1863
- Completed: 1865
- Construction cost: £2,500

Specifications
- Capacity: 300
- Materials: Brick

Administration
- Province: Atlantic
- Diocese: Europe
- Parish: Wiesbaden

Clergy
- Rector: Christopher Easthill
- Priest(s): Douglas Robinson; Robert Vukovic
- Pastor(s): Linda Sauer Bredvik; Dorothee Dziewas

The Church of St Augustine of Canterbury, commonly known as The English church at Wiesbaden (German: Die englische Kirche in Wiesbaden), is a Hessian heritage-listed Anglican parish church located at Frankfurter Strasse 3 in Wiesbaden, Germany. Built in 1865 and named in honour of St Augustine of Canterbury, it was designed in the Gothic Revival style by city engineer Theodor Goetz. The church remains historically, socially, and architecturally significant.

== History ==
=== Foundation to 1966 ===
The cornerstone of the building was laid on 3 June 1863. As early as 1836, however, German church records indicate that British subjects taking the waters at the international spa of Wiesbaden had been holding English-speaking services of their own. At the time of construction, the church was not incorporated as a legal entity, so the property was held in trust by the Kurhausaktiengesellschaft, the company responsible for coordinating the spa amenities of Wiesbaden.

Among the early church leaders were Christopher Benson, brother of Edward White Benson, Archbishop of Canterbury, and his wife Agnes, daughter of the Rev. Professor Robert Walker of Oxford. Benson served as churchwarden and treasurer, but also gave generously to the foundation of the English Church in Lugano. He died and was buried in Wiesbaden in 1890.

In the First World War, with the British spa visitors who composed the parish gone, the church was no longer used for worship services. During the National Socialist period, the property, which the Kurhausaktiengesellschaft had held in trust for the no longer extant congregation, was expropriated by the state. After the end of the Second World War the U.S. military used the building as a military chapel until the current facility at Heinerberg was constructed in 1955. Then the property was deeded to the Bishop of London to return to its original purpose as an Anglican house of worship.

Because a large portion of the congregation continued to be made up of members of the US military and civilian DoD employees and their dependents, the church began to take on an increasingly American character. It has used the American Book of Common Prayer since this point in time, had Americans serving as clergy, and by the 1990s came fully under the jurisdiction of the Convocation of Episcopal Churches in Europe, part of the U.S.-based Episcopal Church.

=== Restoration and after ===
On 23 January 1966, a major fire, caused by a malfunction of the heating system, gutted the building.

On 24 January 2014, the Convocation of Episcopal Churches in Europe announced it would end services in the church and return the building to its owner, the Bishop of London. In March 2014, the Bishop-in-Charge of the Convocation, Pierre Whalon, appointed the Rev. Christopher Easthill (a dual citizen of the United Kingdom and Germany) as priest-in-charge (now rector). Shortly thereafter the bishop agreed to suspend the decision to vacate the building until the congregation and its vestry were able to make further study of their various options for the future.

== Cited texts ==
- Norman, Hilary (2003). The English Church in Wiesbaden: A History. Taunusstein: Druckerei Dierks.
