= Thomas Langdon =

Thomas Langdon may refer to:

- Thomas Langdon (MP) (died 1433), English politician
- Thomas Langdon (cricketer) (1879–1944), English cricketer
- Thomas Langdon (Australian politician) (1832–1914), English-born Australian politician
