= Fetisov Journalism Awards =

Journalism award established in 2019

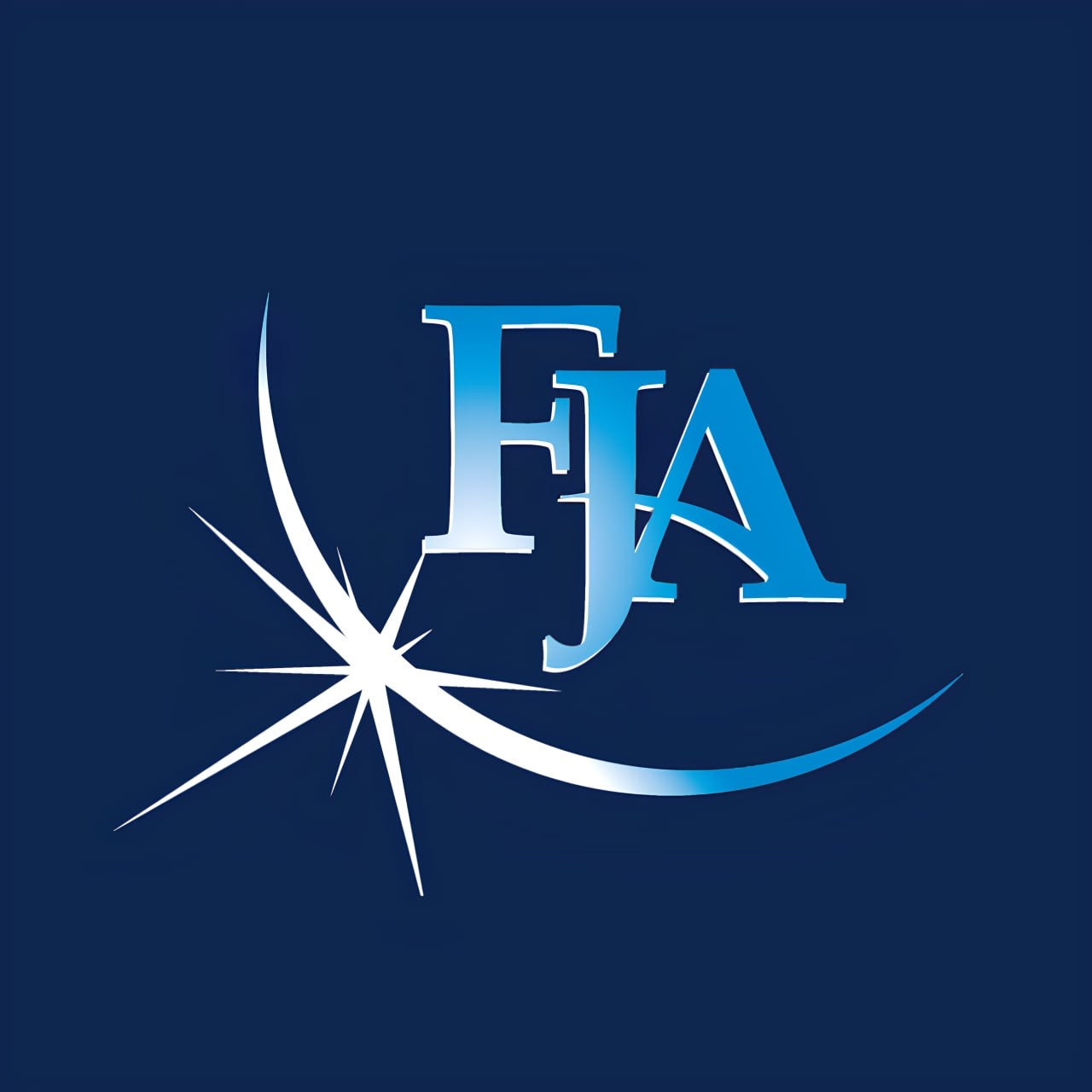
- Awarded for: Excellence in journalism promoting human values and press freedom
- Country: Switzerland
- Presented by: Fetisov Charitable Foundation
- First award: 2019 – present
- Website: fjawards.com

Fetisov Journalism Awards (FJA) is an international journalism award with a focus on investigative reporting, civil rights, environmental journalism, and contributions to peace. It was established in 2019. The prize fund of the award is 520,000 CHF.

== Overview ==
The awards were founded by Cypriot entrepreneur and philanthropist Gleb Fetisov. The initiative aims to support independent journalism and highlight stories that uncover corruption, injustice, and human rights violations.

The competition is open to professional journalists and media organizations. Entries are nominated by journalism unions, media organizations, and experts, with finalists selected by an international jury.

In 2020, 168 applications were submitted from 50 countries (33 were selected). The jury in 2020 included Deborah Bergamini, Guy Mettan, Christophe Deloire, Barbara Trionfi, and others.

== Categories ==
The awards are granted in four main categories:

- Outstanding Investigative Reporting
- Excellence in Environmental Journalism
- Contribution to Civil Rights
- Outstanding Contribution to Peace

Each category awards three winners, with prizes distributed as follows:

- First Prize: 100,000 CHF
- Second Prize: 20,000 CHF
- Third Prize: 10,000 CHF

== Notable winners ==
- The New York Times (2023) – Ruth Maclean and Caleb Kabanda won the award for Excellence in Environmental Journalism for their coverage of Congo’s peatlands.
- Sukanya Shantha (The Wire, 2022) – awarded for her investigative work on the caste system in Indian prisons.
- BIRN Bosnia and Herzegovina (2022) – recognized for uncovering corruption and human rights violations in the Balkans.
- Anna-Catherine Brigida (2023) – recognized for her investigation into surveillance technology in Honduras.
- Deepak Adhikari (Nepal, 2020) – honored for contributions to civil rights journalism.
- Karla Mendes (2022) – awarded for investigative reporting on deforestation and palm oil production.
- Samik Kharel and Roshan Sedhai(2023)-awarded for their investigative story on widows of Nepali migrant workers who died building stadiums in Qatar for the 2022 FIFA World Cup
- Forever Lobbying Project in the category of Excellence in Environmental Journalism (2025)
