= William Chauncy Langdon =

William Chauncy Langdon, c. 1886

William Chauncy Langdon (August 19, 1831 in Burlington, Vermont–1895) was a Protestant Episcopal clergyman and a prominent American proponent of the YMCA. He left a career in patent law to help found the YMCA in Washington, DC, the first chapter in a large urban area. He went on to found the National Confederation of Young Men's Christian Associations and was elected its first general secretary in 1854.

He founded three Episcopal Churches in Europe: Grace Church in Rome, 1859 (later renamed as St. Paul's Within the Walls); St James's in Florence, c. 1870; and Emmanuel Church, Geneva, 1873. They are now parishes of the Convocation of Episcopal Churches in Europe.

His son Courtney Langdon (1861-1924) was a poet, professor, and translator of Dante. Another son, William Chauncy Langdon (1871–1947), was a writer, historian, and wrote and produced many historical pageants.

== General references ==
- Esolen, Anthony. 2020. “No Option: Clear Out the Rubble & Rebuild!” Touchstone: A Journal of Mere Christianity 33 (4): 28–38. EBSCOhost 144254735
- Hoefnagel, Dick & Virginia L. Close. "Charles N Haskins and the Woodward Room at Baker Library". Dartmouth College Library Bulletin.
- "William Chauncy Langdon." In Dictionary of American Biography. New York, NY: Charles Scribner's Sons, 1936. Gale In Context: Biography (accessed January 16, 2021). Gale BT2310009415
- Stefano Villani, “William Chauncey Langdon e l’attività del Comitato sulla Riforma italiana della Chiesa Protestante Episcopale negli Stati Uniti d’America (1865-1874),” Protestantesimo, 73 (2018), pp. 129-186.

== Bibliography ==
- Memorial on the Subject of the Italian Reform Movement (1865)
- Papers and Correspondence of the Joint Committee on the Italian Reform Movement (1866)
- The Defects in Our Practical Catholicity (1871)
- Le odierne quistioni politico-ecclesiastiche e la Chiesa Americana (1875)
