= Province 2 =

Province 2 could refer to:

- Madhesh Province, Nepal
- Province 2 of the Episcopal Church, spanning the United States, Cuba, Haiti, the British Virgin Islands, and continental Europe
