= Bigliardi =

Bigliardi is an Italian surname. Notable people with the surname include:

- Matthew P. Bigliardi (1920–1996), American bishop of the Episcopal Church
- Tebaldo Bigliardi (born 1963), Italian footballer
