= Mark D. W. Edington =

American Episcopal priest & bishop

The Right Reverend Mark D. W. Edington
- Bishop in charge of the Convocation of Episcopal Churches in Europe
- Church: Episcopal Church
- Diocese: Convocation of Episcopal Churches in Europe
- Elected: October 20, 2018
- In office: 2019–present
- Predecessor: Pierre Whalon

Orders
- Ordination: May 26, 2001 by Barbara Harris
- Consecration: April 6, 2019 by Michael Curry

Personal details
- Born: March 15, 1961 (age 65) Lansing, Michigan, United States
- Denomination: Anglican
- Spouse: Judith

Mark David Wheeler Edington (born March 15, 1961) is the bishop in charge of the Convocation of Episcopal Churches in Europe.

== Education ==
Edington attended public schools in East Lansing before studying at Albion College, where he graduated summa cum laude with majors in philosophy and political science. As an undergraduate he studied at the Université libre de Bruxelles, focusing on the history of European integration. During and after his undergraduate studies, Edington worked on the staff of the Michigan House of Representatives, becoming Administrative Assistant to the House Republican Leader. He then attended the Fletcher School of Law and Diplomacy, where his studies concentrated on international security and diplomatic history. Following a career in policy research, he attended Harvard Divinity School.

== Career ==
=== Policy research and higher education ===
Edington worked for ten years as a policy analyst and director of publications at the Institute for Foreign Policy Analysis, a think-tank associated with the Fletcher School. His research focused on low-intensity conflict after the collapse of the Cold War international system, and his writings on terrorism appeared in The Atlantic and the New York Times, among other outlets. Upon entering Harvard Divinity School, he accepted a position as consulting editor at Daedalus, the journal of the American Academy of Arts and Sciences.

Following graduation, he accepted a position as senior administrator of the Divinity School's Center for the Study of World Religions, working with Diana L. Eck, David Carrasco, and Janet Gyatso. He served as well as a teaching fellow for Harvey Cox. In 2004, he took up an appointment as Associate Minister for Administration at The Memorial Church of Harvard University, serving until 2007. Edington returned to Harvard in 2009 as the inaugural executive director of the Harvard Decision Science Laboratory at Harvard Kennedy School. In 2014, he took up an appointment as the founding director of the Amherst College Press, developing the press as a model for open access publishing. A vocal advocate for open access in scholarly communications, Edington has argued for a shift away from market-driven structures in academic publishing, and has argued for a system of disclosure making peer review processes transparent to readers.

=== Religious ===
Edington was ordained to the diaconate on May 27, 2000 by The Right Reverend M. Thomas Shaw, SSJE, and to the priesthood by The Right Reverend Barbara C. Harris on May 26, 2001. He served as the first Epps Fellow and Chaplain to Harvard College in The Memorial Church from 2000 to 2007 under Peter J. Gomes. From 2007 to 2009 he was rector of Saint Dunstan's parish in Dover, Massachusetts, and from 2009 to 2019 served as priest, and later rector, of Saint John's Parish in Newtonville, Massachusetts.

He was elected bishop of the Convocation of Episcopal Churches in Europe on the eighth ballot on October 20, 2018 and consecrated at the Cathedral of the Holy Trinity in Paris, France, on April 6, 2019. He is the twenty-sixth bishop of the convocation, but only the second elected one.

He has written on the impact of shifting economics and trends in church affiliation on the profession of ministry, advocating for new models of bivocational ministry as a means of reinvigorating small congregations.

== Personal life ==
Edington married Judith Hadden in 1983. He is a life member of the Council on Foreign Relations and a member of the Cosmos Club and the Club of Odd Volumes.

== Publications ==
- Mark D. W. Edington, "The Fog of the Familiar Paradigm," Dædalus, 126:2 (Spring 1997), 211-231.
- Mark D. W. Edington, Bivocational: Returning to the Roots of Ministry. New York: Church Publishing, 2018.
