= St. Paul's Within the Walls =

- American Church in Rome
- Italian: San Paolo dentro le Mura
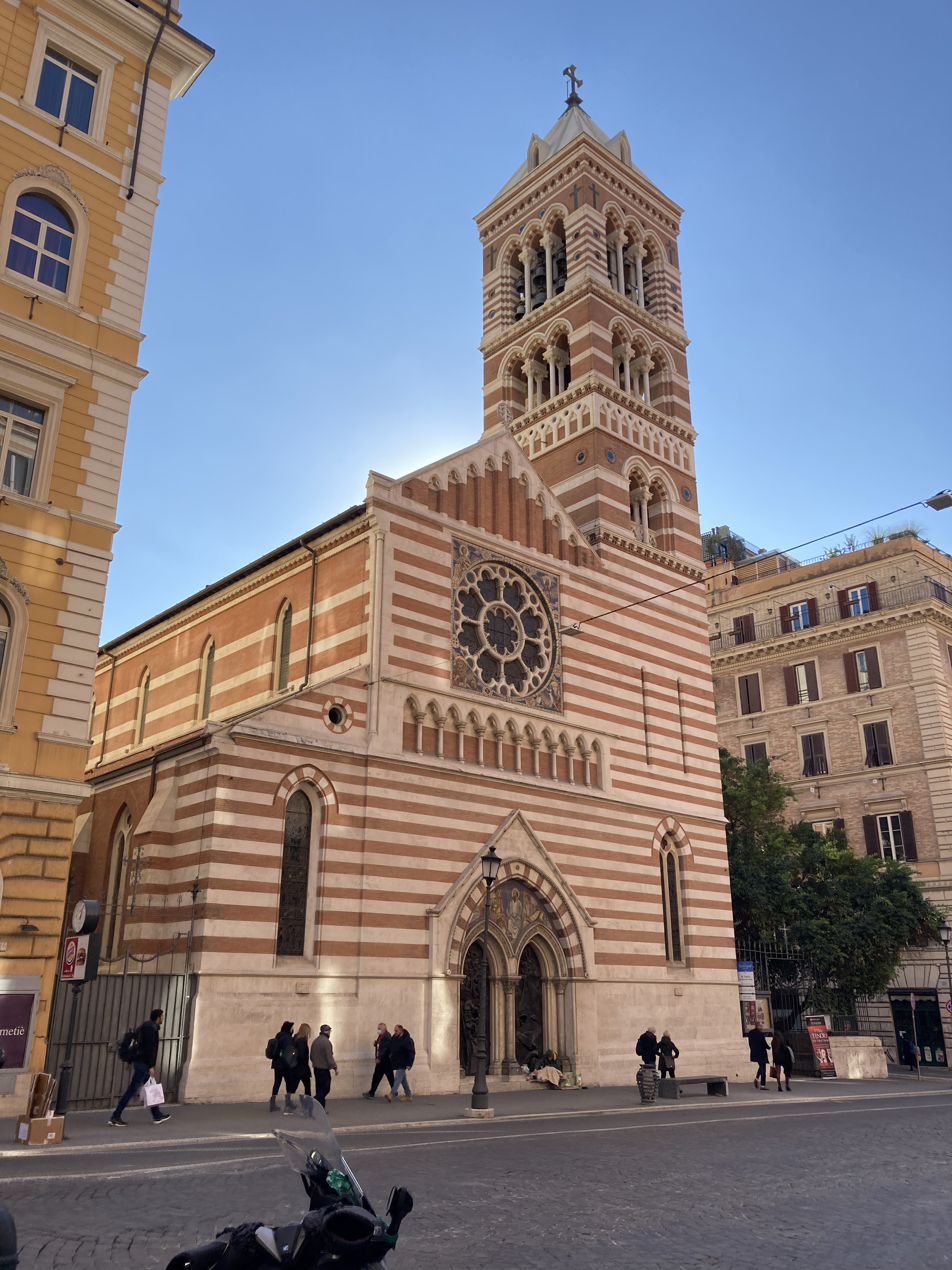
- St. Paul's Within the Walls
- Location: Via Napoli 58 and 00184 Rome RM
- Country: Italy
- Denomination: Episcopal Church
- Website: www.stpaulsrome.it

History
- Founded: 1872; 154 years ago
- Dedication: St. Paul
- Consecrated: 25 March 1876

Architecture
- Architect: George Edmund Street
- Architectural type: Church
- Style: Gothic Revival
- Completed: 1880

Administration
- Province: Province II
- Diocese: Convocation of Episcopal Churches in Europe

Clergy
- Bishop: Mark D. W. Edington
- Rector: Jonathan W. Evans
- Vicar: Francisco Alberca

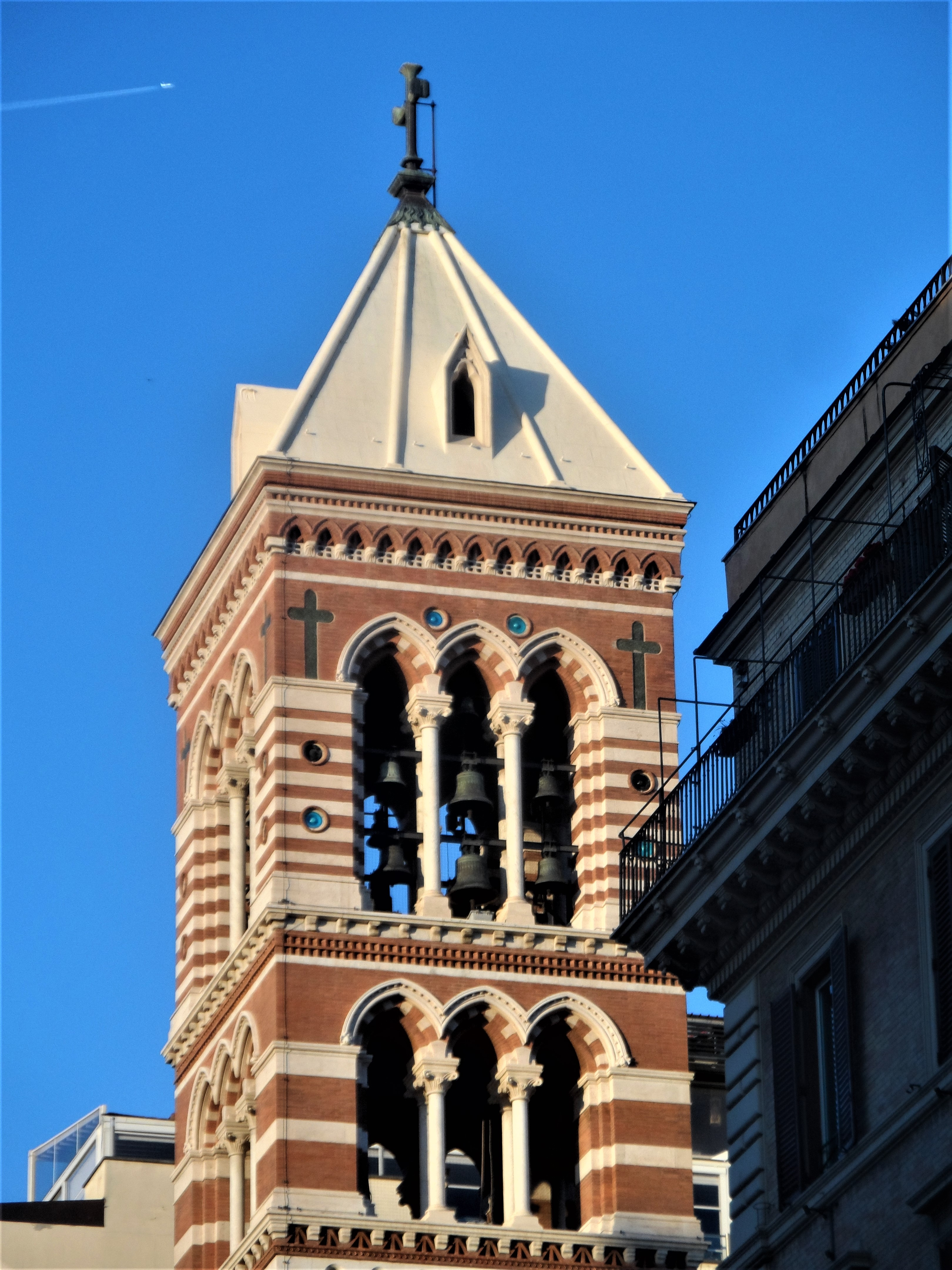
Carillon of 23 bells visible in the tower

St. Paul's Within the Walls (Italian: San Paolo dentro le Mura), also known as the American Church in Rome, is a church of the Convocation of Episcopal Churches in Europe on Via Nazionale in Castro Pretorio, Rome. It was the first Protestant church to be built in Rome. Completed in 1880, it was designed by English architect George Edmund Street in Gothic Revival style, built out of polychrome brick and stone.

The church contains mosaics which are the largest works of the English Pre-Raphaelite artist Edward Burne-Jones.

== Construction ==
Building a Protestant church in Rome became possible after the Kingdom of Italy's Capture of Rome from the Papacy in 1870.

The Episcopal expatriate congregation in Rome commissioned Street in 1872. The cornerstone was laid in 1873, and the church was inaugurated in 1876.

== Mosaics ==
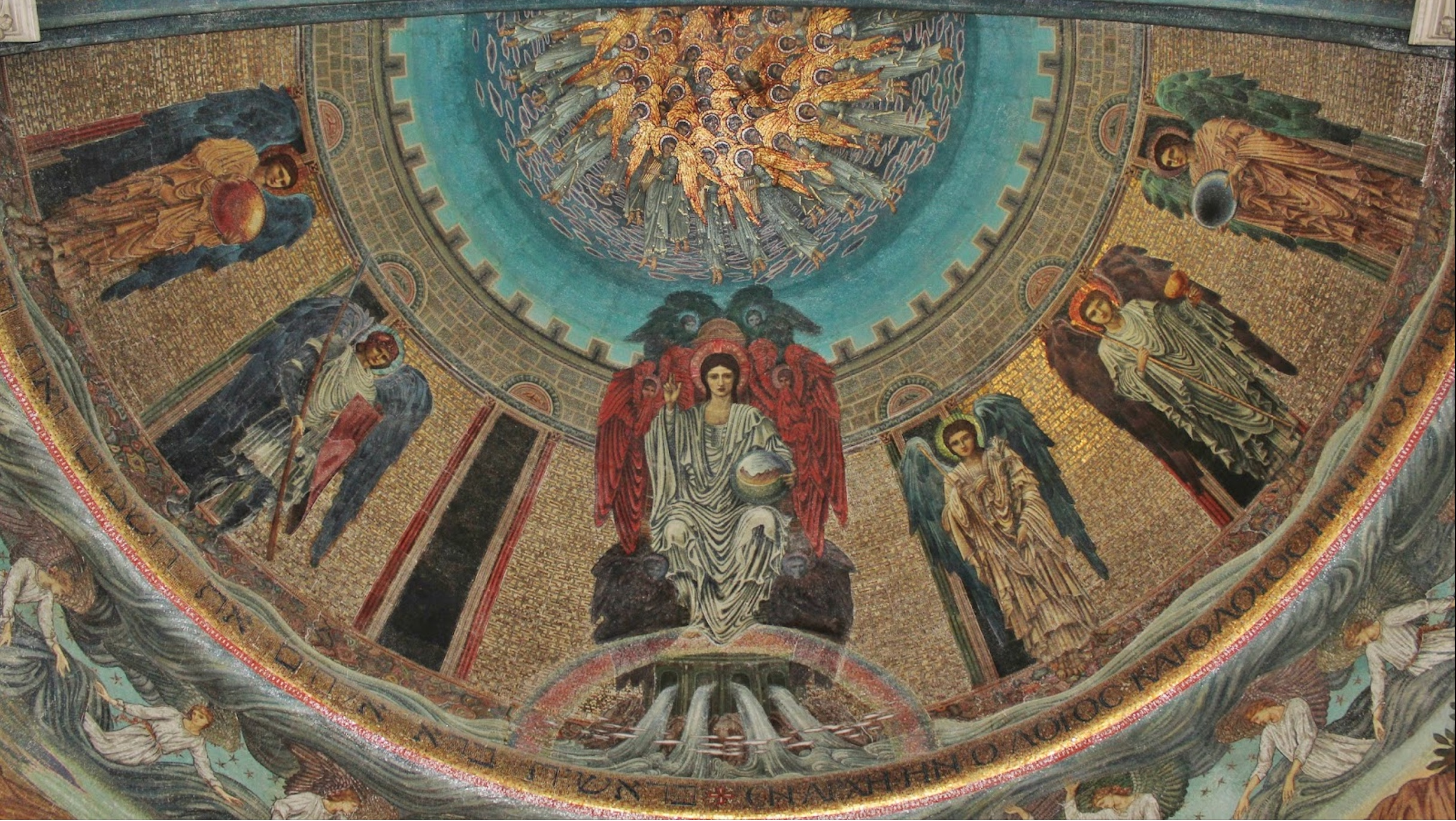
Christ Enthroned in the Heavenly Jerusalem, Christ is flanked by five archangels, from left: Uriel holds the sun, Michael in armour, Gabriel bears the lily of the Annunciation, Chemuel holds the sacred cup, and Zophiel holds the moon.

Street approached Burne-Jones in 1881, but died the same year. The congregation's rector, Robert J. Nevin, travelled to England to confirm and expand the commission.

Burne-Jones was eager to emulate the mosaics of Ravenna, which he had visited in 1873.

Burne-Jones designed cartoons which he sent to Venice, together with specifications for the colours to be used. The Venice and Murano Glass and Mosaic Company mounted tesserae onto the cartoons, and the resulting assemblies were then installed in the church. The selection of colours, based on sample tiles sent to England by the company, was a collaboration between Burne-Jones and William Morris. Burne-Jones did not travel to Italy to supervise the work, instead sending his assistant, Thomas Rooke.

There are four Burne-Jones mosaics. The Annunciation and The Tree of Life, both completed in 1894, are over successive arches of the chancel, leading towards the apse, whose semi-dome displays Christ Enthroned in the Heavenly Jerusalem, completed in 1885. The fourth mosaic, known as The Earthly Paradise or The Church Militant, lower down on the wall of the apse, was completed in 1907 by Rooke, after Burne-Jones's death.

Burne-Jones set the Annunciation scene in a desert, while The Tree of Life shows Christ in the pose of crucifixion but superimposed on a verdant tree. In the depiction of the Heavenly Jerusalem, Christ is flanked by archangels, with an empty space representing Lucifer's vacated position. The fourth mosaic includes figures with faces modelled on contemporary people.

The church also contains mosaics by the American artist George Breck, who had studied in Rome between 1897 and 1902, and stained glass windows in the nave, designed and manufactured for the church by the English firm of Clayton and Bell, a company also influenced by the Pre-Raphaelite movement. These tell the story of the life of St. Paul.

== Gallery ==
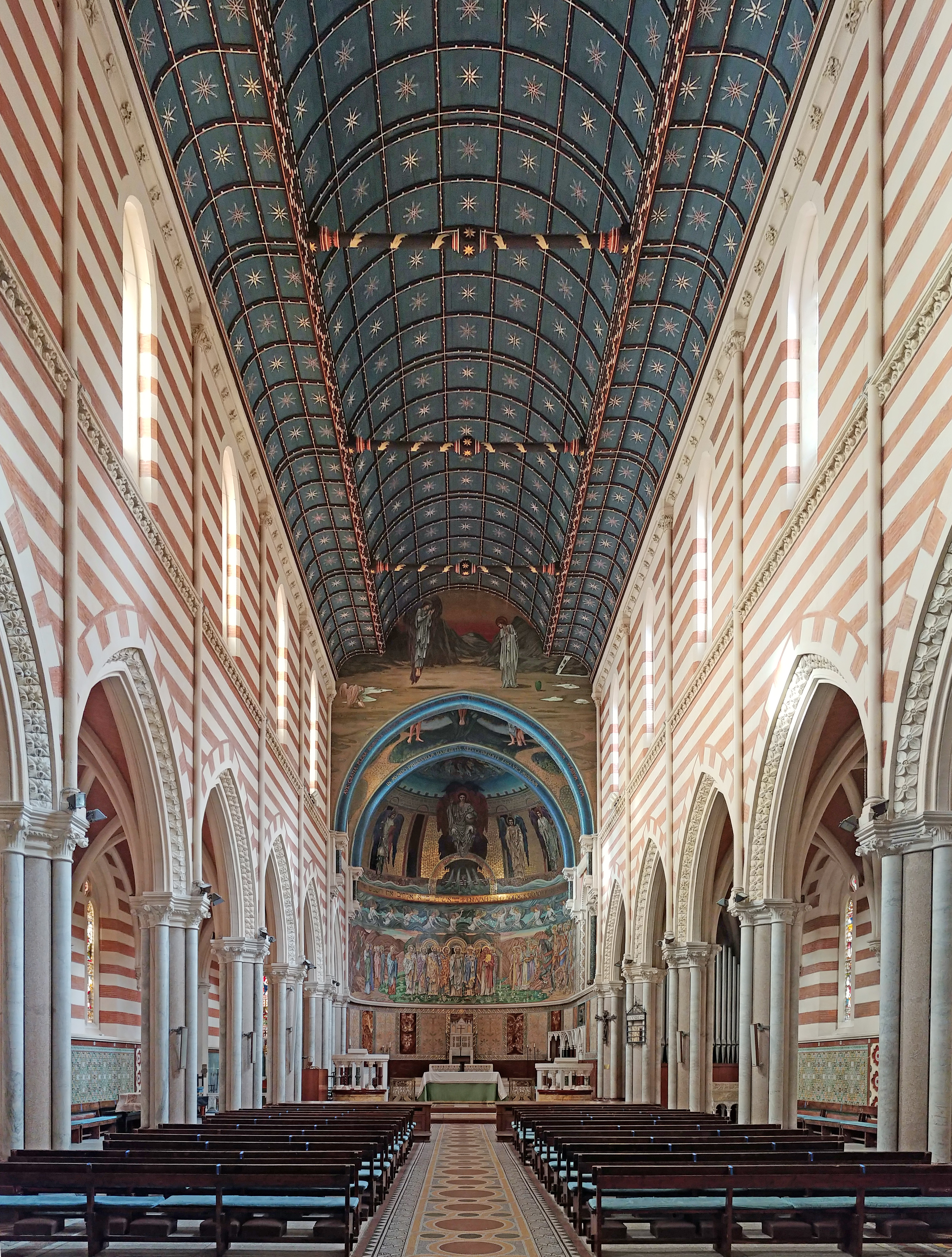
Interior of the church

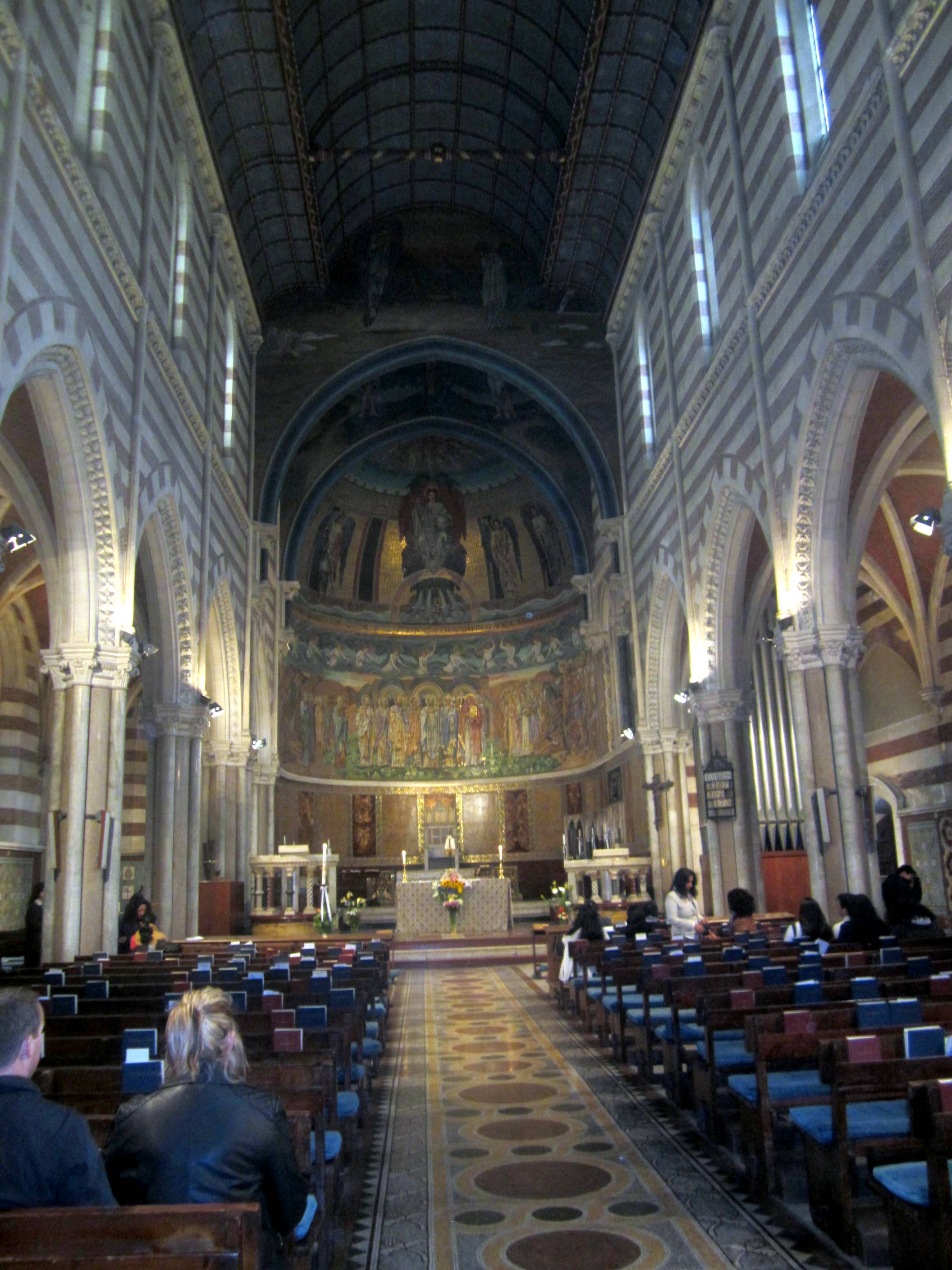
The nave, looking towards the apse

== Joel Nafuma Refugee Center (JNRC) ==
Located at St. Paul's Within the Walls Episcopal Church, the Joel Nafuma Refugee Center (JNRC) is a day center for refugees in the heart of Rome, founded in 1982.

The scope of services offered in the center range from basic assistance to settlement services, and aim to address the needs of the whole person. Staff and volunteers accompany guests in their struggle to rebuild their lives through ongoing art and psychotherapy programs and legal support. This spectrum of services aims to address the immediate and urgent needs of newly arrived guests, as well as the needs of guests who (due to the Dublin Regulation) will seek to rebuild their lives in Italy.

In October 2018, the US Ambassador Callista Gingrich visited to make a formal presentation of a grant from the U.S. Department of State's Julia Taft Refugee Fund.

== See also ==
- All Saints' Church, Rome (Anglican, also by G. E. Street)
- American Cathedral in Paris
- American Church in Paris
- American Church in Berlin
