= James T. Bates =

American businessman

James T. Bates, unknown date

James Tuttle Bates (29 September 1844 – 24 December 1914) was an American businessman who founded the daily newspaper Tribune de Genève on 1 February 1879.

== Early life ==
Bates was born in Boston, Massachusetts. He was a son of shipowner Joseph C. Bates and Abigail (née Carleton) Bates (1820–1873).

He enlisted at age 17 in the Union army, attaining the rank of lieutenant colonel at age 21.

== Career ==
After the war, Bates became a stockbroker in New York City. After making a fortune, he moved to Geneva, Switzerland, the hometown of his wife, in 1875. Soon after moving, he acquired the newspaper The Continental Herald and Swiss Times in 1876, which shortly thereafter became the daily Tribune de Genève on 1 February 1879.

In 1887, he founded the "Union Bank", which was absorbed into the Union Bank of Switzerland (later to become UBS AG) in 1919.

== Personal life ==
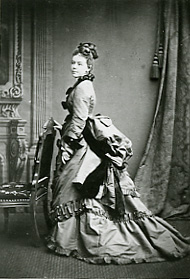
Photograph of his first wife, Amélie

On 8 December 1873, he married Amélie Chenevière (1846–1889), the daughter of Geneva state councilor Arthur Chenevière and the former Susanne Firmine Munier. Together, they were the parents of six children, five of whom lived to maturity, including:

- Marguerite Bates (1874–1964), who married René Monod (1872–1965), a Swiss Private Banker with Darier & Cie, in 1896.
- Alice Bates (1876–1949), who married Humbert de Cerjat (1867–1900) in 1899. After his death, she married Alfred Adolphe Gautier (1858–1920), member of the International Committee of the Red Cross and a judge of the Court of Cassation, in 1907.
- Maurice-Edmond Bates (1877–1877), who died in infancy.
- Gertrude Violette Bates (b. 1880), who married Paul Wladimir Sarasin (1871–1940), a grandson of Vice Admiral Georges de Bock, aide-de-camp to Alexander II, in 1903.
- Edmée-Mina Bates (b. 1881), who married Belgian André Gouzée, manager of the Mortgage Company of Canada, in 1910.
- Frederick-Norris Bates (1883–1972), a director of the Union Bank who married Renée Brot (1894–1978) in 1915.

On 2 March 1903, he married Henriette (née Baron) Pictet (1858–1943) in Geneva. Henriette, the widow of Léonce Pictet, was a daughter of Jacques Louis Aimé Baron.

He was a founder and an active member of Emmanuel Episcopal Church, also known as the "American Church" of Geneva.

Bates died in Geneva on 24 December 1914. His widow died in 1943.
