= 24 heures (Switzerland) =

Swiss daily newspaper

- Type: Daily newspaper
- Owner(s): Tamedia (TX Group)
- Founder: David Duret
- Founded: 1762; 264 years ago
- Language: French
- Headquarters: Lausanne, Vaud
- Country: Switzerland
- Circulation: 55,147 (as of 2017)
- Sister newspapers: Tribune de Genève
- ISSN: 1661-2256
- OCLC number: 611051843
- Website: www.24heures.ch

24 heures (French pronunciation: [vɛ̃tkatʁ œʁ], lit. '24 Hours') is a Swiss French-language daily newspaper, published by Tamedia in Lausanne, Vaud. Founded in 1762 as a collection of announcements and official communications, it claims to be the oldest newspaper in the world with uninterrupted publication. It was founded by David Duret as the Annonces et avis divers; it was later renamed the Feuille d'avis de Lausanne and then adopted the name 24 heures in 1972.

== History ==
Feuille d'Avis de Lausanne, 12 January 1900

24 heures was founded in 1762 by David Duret (1733–1803) as the Annonces et avis divers, a weekly collection of announcements and classified ads like many at the time. It was then made a biweekly paper in 1851, and a triweekly the next year. In 1872, it became a daily, with editor Jean-Ulrich-Martin Allenspach. The paper later became the Feuille d'avis de Lausanne towards the end of the century, and integrated an independent news section on 16 December 1872. It became a public limited company in 1906. Marc Lamunière entrusted the modernization of the paper to Marcel Pasche, a creative director, in 1952. The paper adopted its current name in 1972.

It was bought by Edipresse in 2002, before being bought by Tamedia in 2009. It covers regional news, but also international and national news. The newspaper shares some of its content with the Tribune de Genève, Tamedia's local newspaper for the Canton of Geneva. In 2024, Tamedia, now its owner, made plans to merge the editorial offices of the publication with other publications it owned, Le Matin and the Tribune de Genève.

At the start of the 20th century, its circulation was about 26,000. The 2006 circulation of 24 heures was 95,315 copies. Between 2007 and 2011, circulation dropped from 89,102 to 78,964. As of 2017, the newspaper had a circulation of 55,147. It is the oldest newspaper in the world with uninterrupted publication.

== Organization ==
Since 25 February 2005, the newspaper has had four local editions, with sections for the specific area of the canton:

- Lausanne and area
- Nord Vaudois-Broye
- La Côte
- Riviera-Chablais

The Nord Vaudois-Broye and Riviera-Chablais editions replaced the newspapers La Presse Riviera/Chablais and La Presse Nord Vaudois.
