= Paris Choral Society =

- Choir
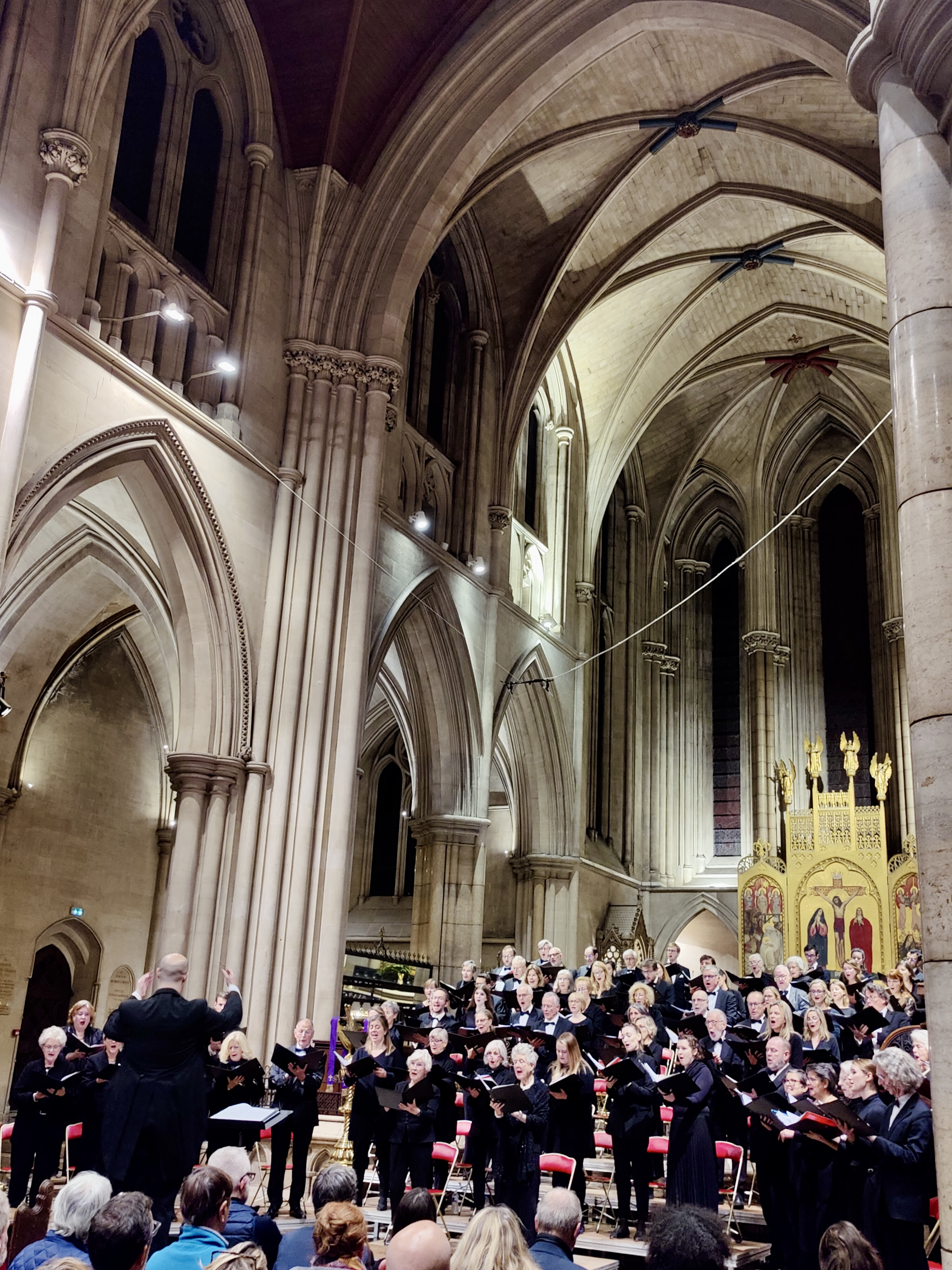
- Founded: 1994
- Members: 95
- Music director: Lewis Hammond
- Website: www.parischoralsociety.org

The Paris Choral Society (or PCS) is an auditioned amateur choir based at the American Cathedral in Paris, France.

The PCS is incorporated as a voluntary association under French law as an Association loi de 1901, and is made up of around 95 singers of different nationalities dedicated to the performance of choral masterpieces. Three concerts are performed every season accompanied by professional orchestras and soloists.

== History ==
Founded in 1994 by a group of non-professional singers under the direction of Edward J. Tipton, the PCS quickly became known for its high standard of performance and its annual Sing-along of Handel’s Messiah which has been held every December since the inception of the choir. The current Music Director is Lewis Hammond.

In recent years, the Paris Choral Society has performed Roth's Earthrise and Dove's Who Killed Cock Robin? (March 2025), Handel's Messiah (December 2024), Rutti's Requiem (French premiere, March 2024), Mendelssohn's Elijah and Dett's The Chariot Jubilee (December 2023), Rossini's Petite messe solennelle (June 2023, 2011), Verdi's Requiem (March 2023), Rütti's Three Carols and Britten's A Ceremony of Carols (December 2022), Mendelssohn's Lobgesang and Sandström's Te Deum (June 2022), Whitacre's Sainte-Chapelle (Recorded performance in Sainte-Chapelle), Dvořák's Stabat Mater (March 2022), Orff's Carmina Burana (June 2017), Mozart's Great Mass in C Minor (2016), Handel's Dixit Dominus and Coronation Anthems (November 2015), Beethoven's Missa Solemnis in the Church of Saint-Eustache (March 2015), Fauré's Requiem and Bernstein's Chichester Psalms (November 2014), Rachmaninoff's Vespers (March 2017), Bach's B Minor Mass (April 2014), Brahms A German Requiem, Haydn's The Creation (2013), Mozart's Requiem (2011, 2018), Bach's St. John Passion (2012), Morten Lauridsen's Lux Aeterna (2011).
