= Avenue George V =

Avenue in Paris, France

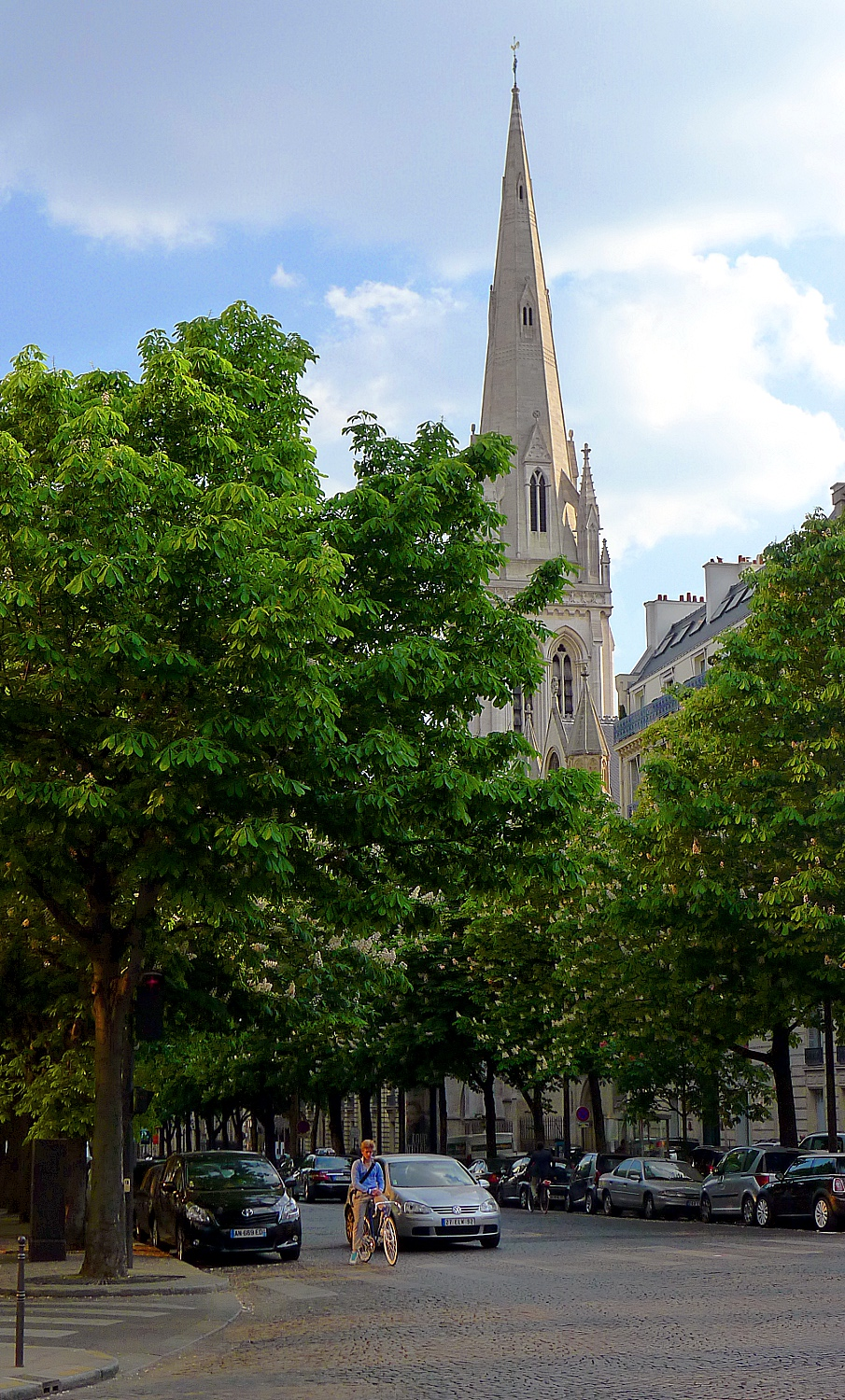
- Avenue George V with the American Cathedral in Paris in the background

- Location within Paris
- Length: 730 m (2,400 ft)
- Width: 40 m (130 ft)
- Arrondissement: 8th
- Quarter: Élysées, Chaillot
- Coordinates: 48°52′04″N 2°18′04″E
- From: Place de l'Alma, 5
- To: Ave des Champs-Élysées, 99

Construction
- Completion: 6 March 1858
- Denomination: 14 July 1918

The Avenue George V (French pronunciation: [avny ʒɔʁʒ sɛ̃k]) is an avenue in the 8th arrondissement of Paris. It starts at the Place de l'Alma, and ends at 99 avenue des Champs-Elysées. It marks the western limit of Paris's "golden triangle" (triangle d'or).

Until 14 July 1918, the avenue was called the Avenue d'Alma. It received its current name in honour of the British monarch George V, who was on the throne at the time, and fought with the Allies during the First World War.

The notable Four Seasons Hotel George V is located at 31 Avenue George V, whilst the American Cathedral in Paris is located at no. 23. The street is served by several bus routes, and by George V metro station, on line 1 of the Paris Metro.

== See also ==
- King George Street (Jerusalem)
