= Europe's Existential Dilemma =

2019 book by Guy Mettan

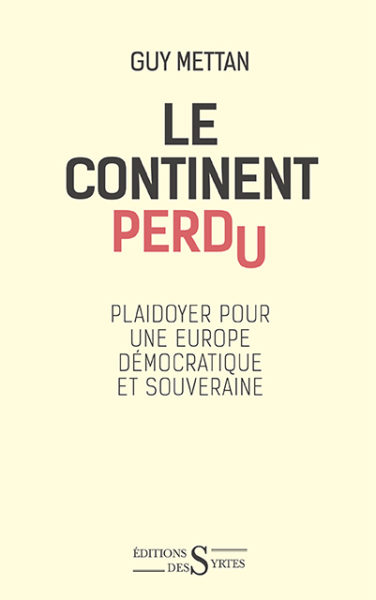
- Author: Guy Mettan
- Original title: Le continent perdu
- Language: French
- Publisher: Éditions des Syrtes
- Publication date: May 2019
- Publication place: Switzerland
- English publication date: 2021
- Pages: 262
- ISBN: 9782940628148

Europe's Existential Dilemma: To Be or Not to Be an American Vassal (French: Le continent perdu. Plaidoyer pour une Europe démocratique et souveraine, lit. 'The Lost Continent: A Plea for a Democratic and Sovereign Europe') is a 2019 book by the Swiss journalist and politician Guy Mettan. Clarity Press published it in English translation in 2021.

== Summary ==
Mettan examines what he regards as the major problems of contemporary Europe: the absence of democracy, a supremacy of economic interests over legal and political matters, ever expanding inefficient institutions, the inability to secure peace, and an increasingly encroaching subordination to the United States. Mettan portrays a possible European choice between increased irrelevance as an American vassal, or the creation of institutions that counter European decline, take advantage of China's challenge to American hegemony, and establish a democratic, sovereign and unified Europe.
