= American Cathedral in Paris =

- Cathedral Church of the Holy Trinity
- Cathédrale Américaine de Paris
- The bell tower, among the tallest in Paris

- The location of the American Cathedral in Paris
- 48°52′3.0″N 2°18′3.0″E
- Location: 23 Avenue George V, Paris, 75008
- Country: France
- Denomination: Episcopal Church Anglican
- Churchmanship: High Church
- Website: americancathedral.org

History
- Status: Cathedral
- Founded: 1859
- Consecrated: 1864 (rue Bayard), 1886 (Avenue George-V)

Architecture
- Functional status: Active
- Heritage designation: Monument Historique PA75080002
- Designated: August 27, 1997
- Architect(s): George Edmund Street, Arthur E. Street, Arthur Blomfield
- Style: Gothic Revival architecture
- Groundbreaking: 1882
- Completed: 1886

Specifications
- Length: 146 feet (45 m)
- Width: 70 feet (21 m)
- Height: 58 feet (18 m)
- Materials: St. Maximin and Savonniere stone, Ancy-le-Franc marble

Administration
- Province: Province II
- Diocese: Convocation of Episcopal Churches in Europe

Clergy
- Bishop: Mark D. W. Edington

The American Cathedral in Paris (French: Cathédrale Américaine de Paris), formally known as the Cathedral Church of the Holy Trinity, is one of the oldest English-speaking churches in Paris. It is the gathering church for the Convocation of Episcopal Churches in Europe, and is part of the worldwide Anglican Communion. The church is located in central Paris between the Champs-Elysées and the River Seine at 23 avenue George V in the 8th arrondissement. The closest métro stations are Alma – Marceau and George V.

== History ==
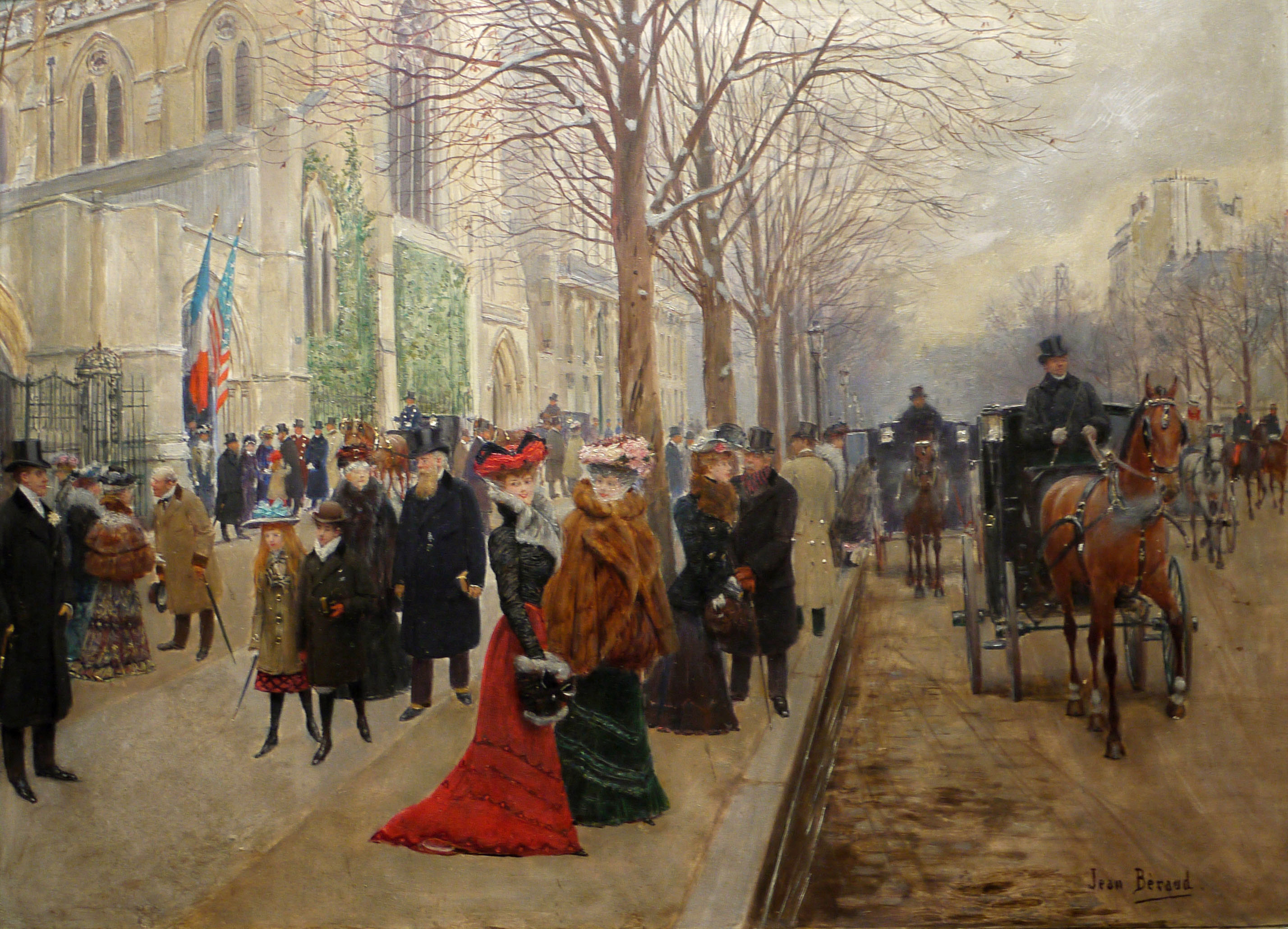
Après l'Office à l'Église de la Sainte-Trinité, Noël 1890 ("After the Service at Holy Trinity Church, Christmas 1890") by Jean Béraud

The origins of the American Cathedral of the Holy Trinity, an English-speaking Episcopal church in Paris, date back to the 1830s when American Episcopalians began to meet together for services in the garden pavilion of the Hôtel Matignon, now the official residence of the French prime minister, then the home of American expatriate Colonel Herman Thorn (1783–1859). In 1859, the formal establishment of a parish took place and in 1864 the first church building was consecrated on Rue Bayard.

It was in the 1870s that John B. Morgan, who was a cousin of J. P. Morgan, became the rector of Holy Trinity Parish. He decided that the congregation needed a larger church and began a fund-raising effort which was successful in raising the money needed. The site that was purchased for construction is on Avenue George V (then called Avenue de l'Alma) and was originally part of the estate of the half-brother of Emperor Napoléon III, the Duc de Morny. The plans were approved in October 1882 and construction was completed in less than four years. The church had its inaugural services in September 1886.

Consecration of the church took place on Thanksgiving Day, 25 November 1886, which coincided with the dedication of the Statue of Liberty in New York. Holy Trinity became a cathedral in 1922, continuing as a parish church and also serving as the official seat of the bishop in charge of Episcopal churches in Europe.

The cathedral appears in the painting Après l'Office à l'Église de la Sainte-Trinité, Noël 1890 ("After the Service at Holy Trinity Church, Christmas 1890") by Jean Béraud. The original painting is on loan to the Musée Carnavalet in the 3rd arrondissement.

During the German occupation of France during World War II (1940–44), the cathedral was taken over by the German military chaplaincy.

The congregation of the American Cathedral is composed of around four hundred permanent parishioners supplemented by many students, tourists, and business travelers. The ministries of the church include parish life, Christian education, development, finance, mission and outreach, community outreach, stewardship, the 20s and 30s group, and music. The building hosts a bilingual Montessori school, recovery groups such as AA, a weekly free concert series on Sundays sponsored by Les Arts George V, Paris Choral Society and many more community-based services.

== Architecture ==
The current building was designed by English architect George Edmund Street, who had also designed the American Church in Rome, in the Gothic Revival style. He subscribed to what he called "ethical architecture," such that if something seems to be a column made of marble, then it should be an actual column, needed for a structural reason, made of marble.

Street died in December 1881 before the finalization of plans and his son, Arthur E. Street, as well as Arthur Blomfield, took over the work. While the chancel and aisles vaults are stone, the nave is vaulted in oak, perhaps due to the constrained site preventing the buttresses that would be required for the weight of a stone ceiling. The construction was accomplished by Henry Lovatt of Wolverhampton.

While the main part of the church was completed by 1886, construction on the tower and other work continued for more than two decades. The stained-glass windows were designed by James Bell and John Beckham, and constructed between 1883 and 1893. Forty-two in number, their theme is the words of the Te Deum. The tower, at 280 feet (85 m) among the tallest in Paris, was dedicated on Easter Sunday in 1909.

== Gallery ==
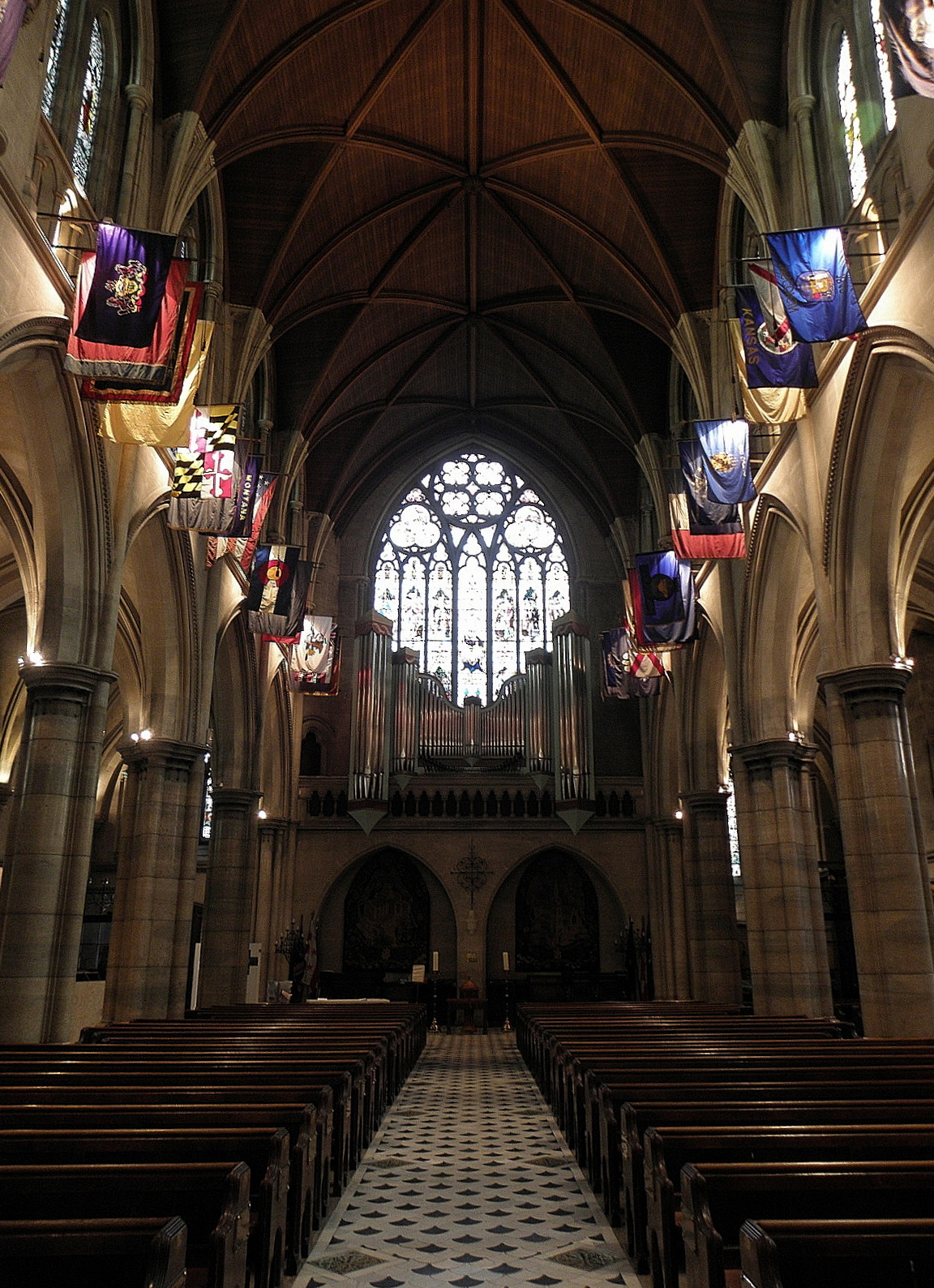
Nave and part of the organ.

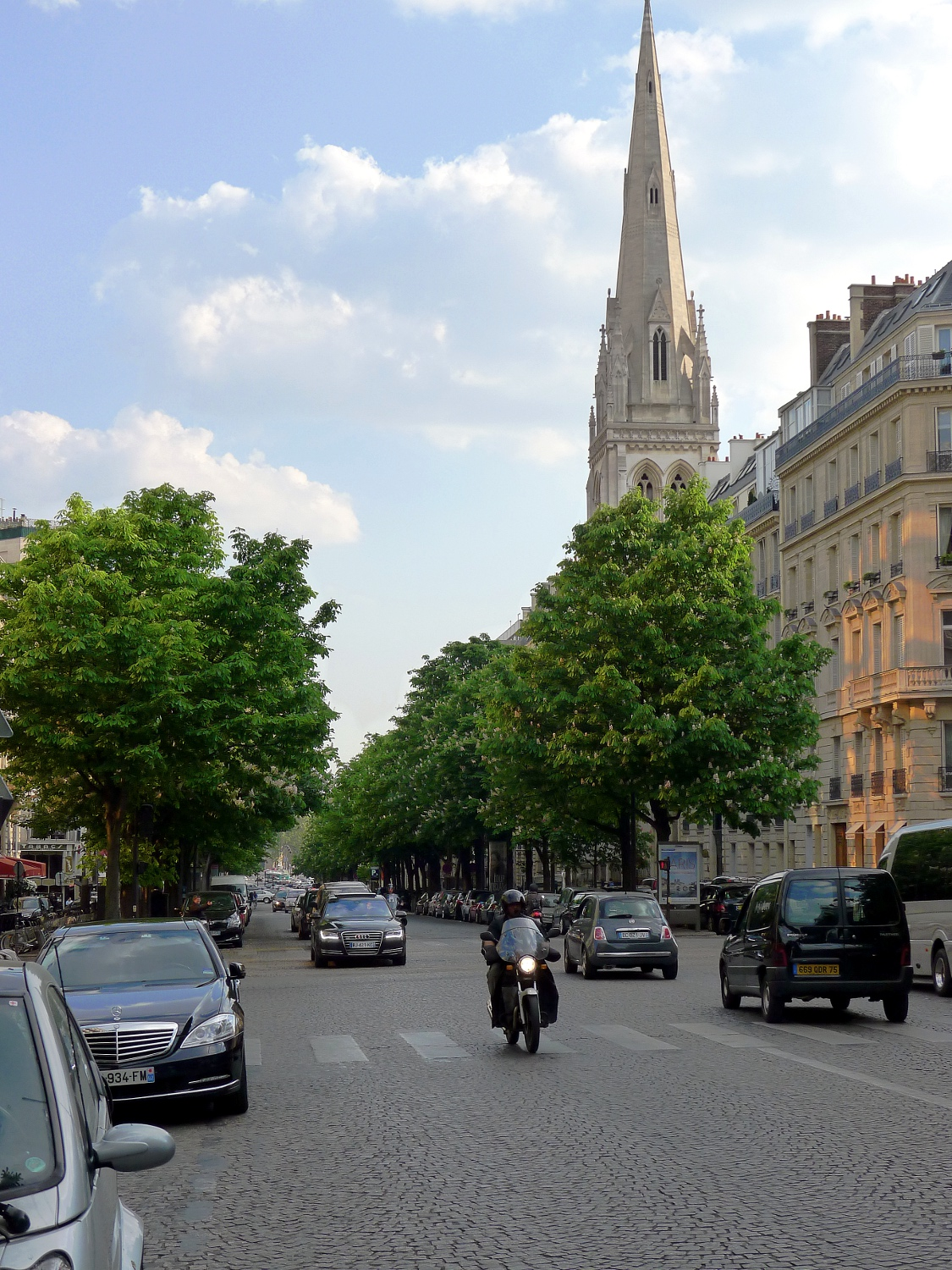
Avenue George V with the American Cathedral in Paris in the background.

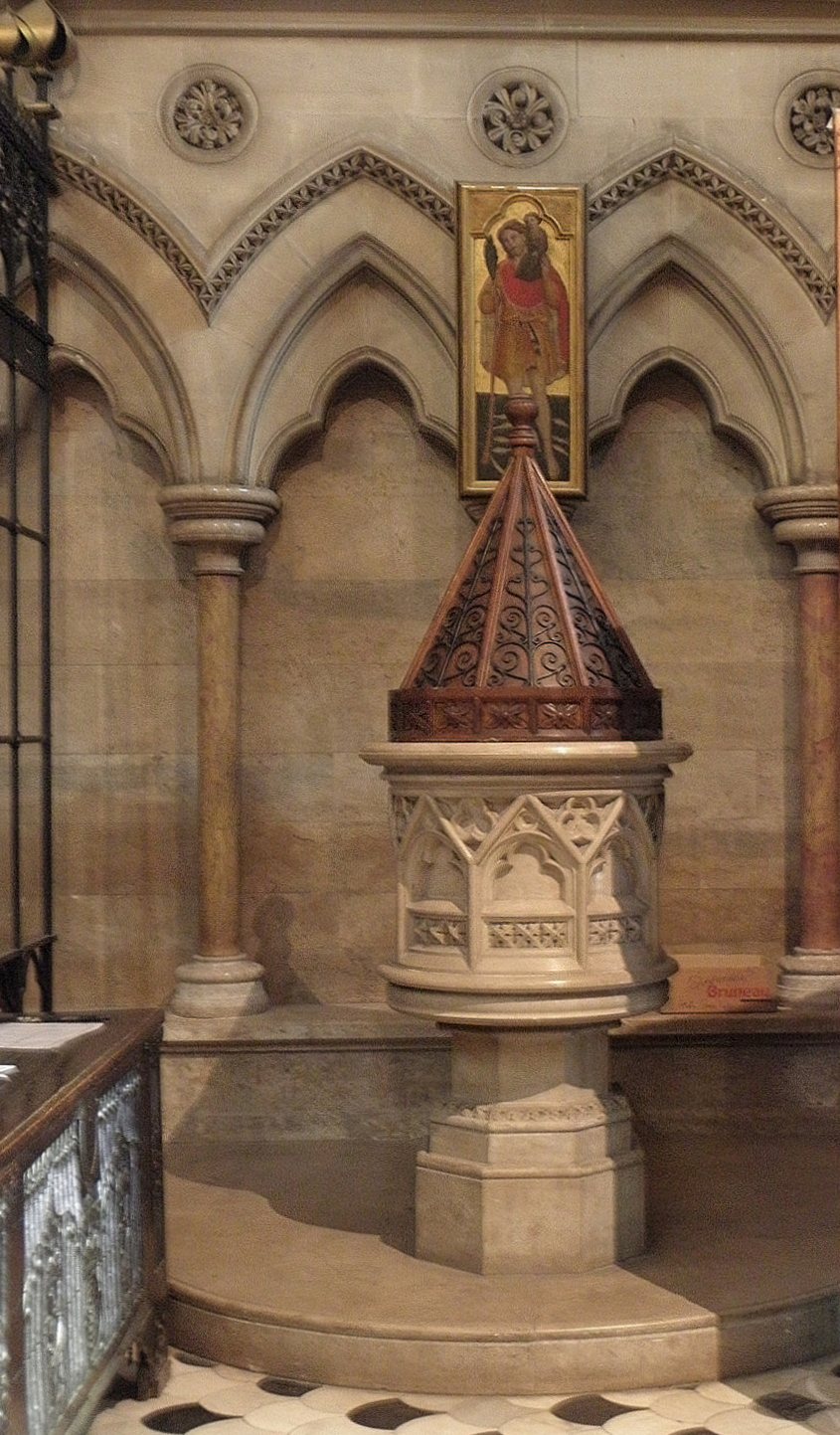
Baptismal font

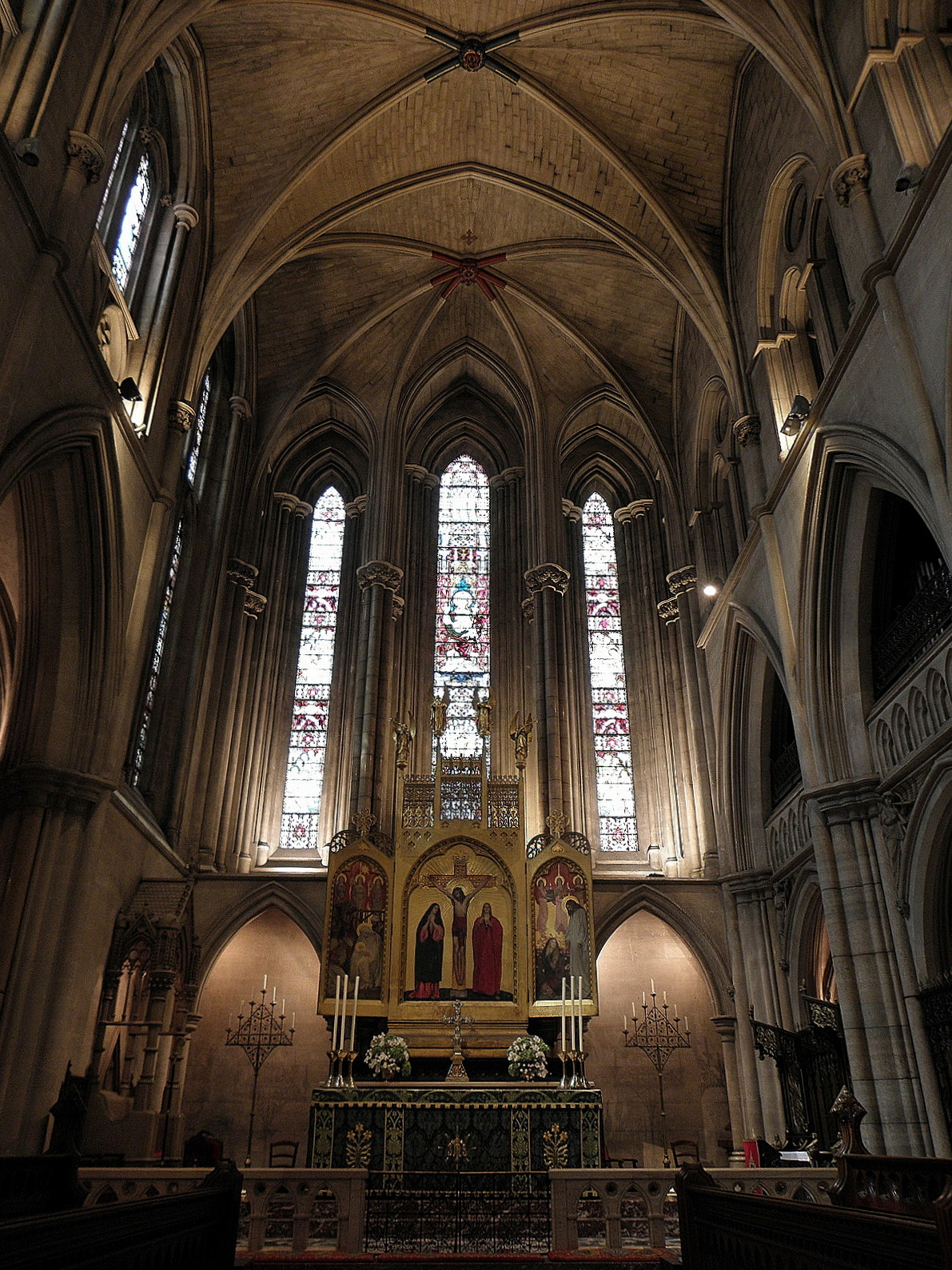
The altar

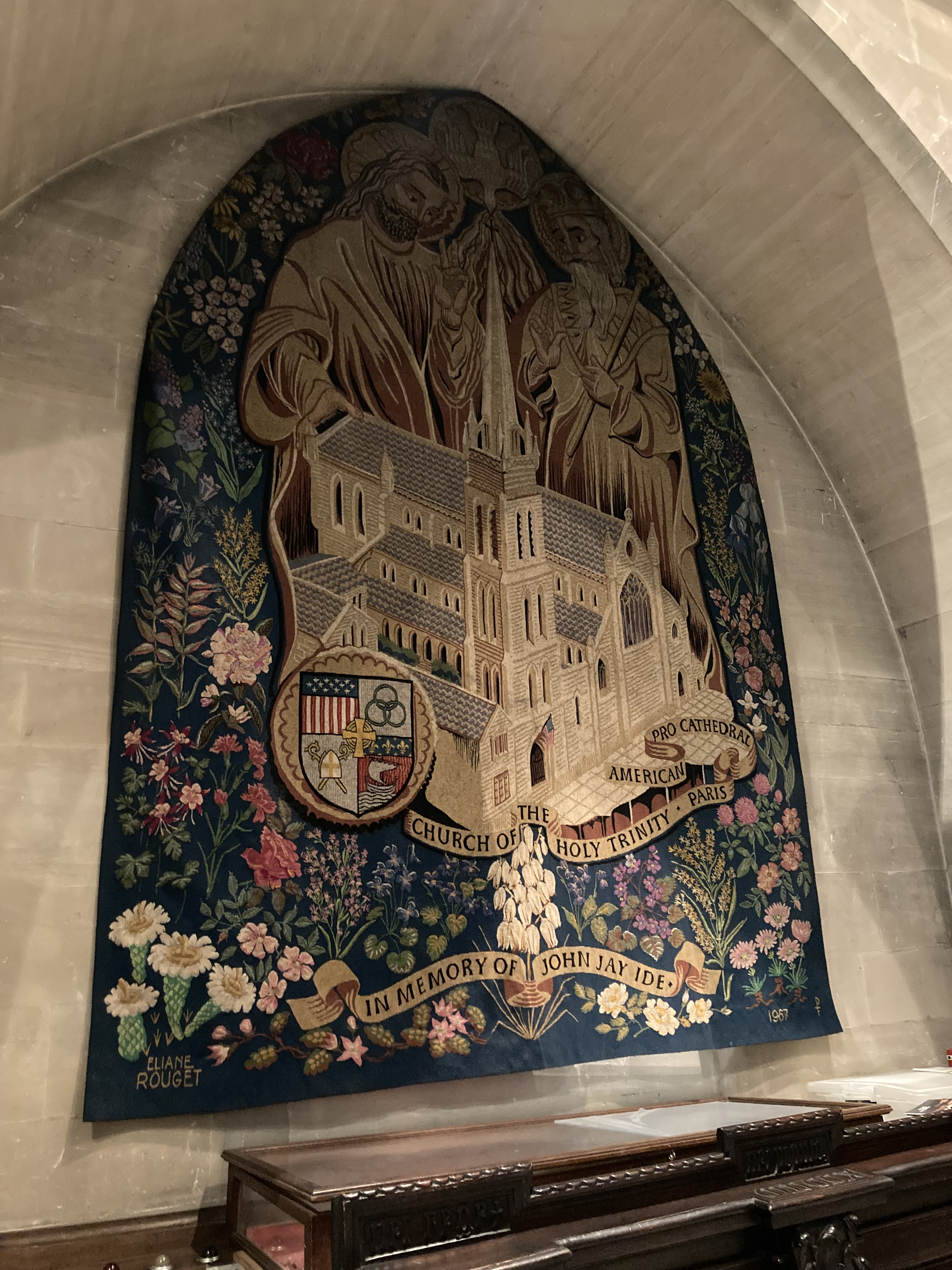
Tapestry of the American Cathedral in Paris in the self-same cathedral.

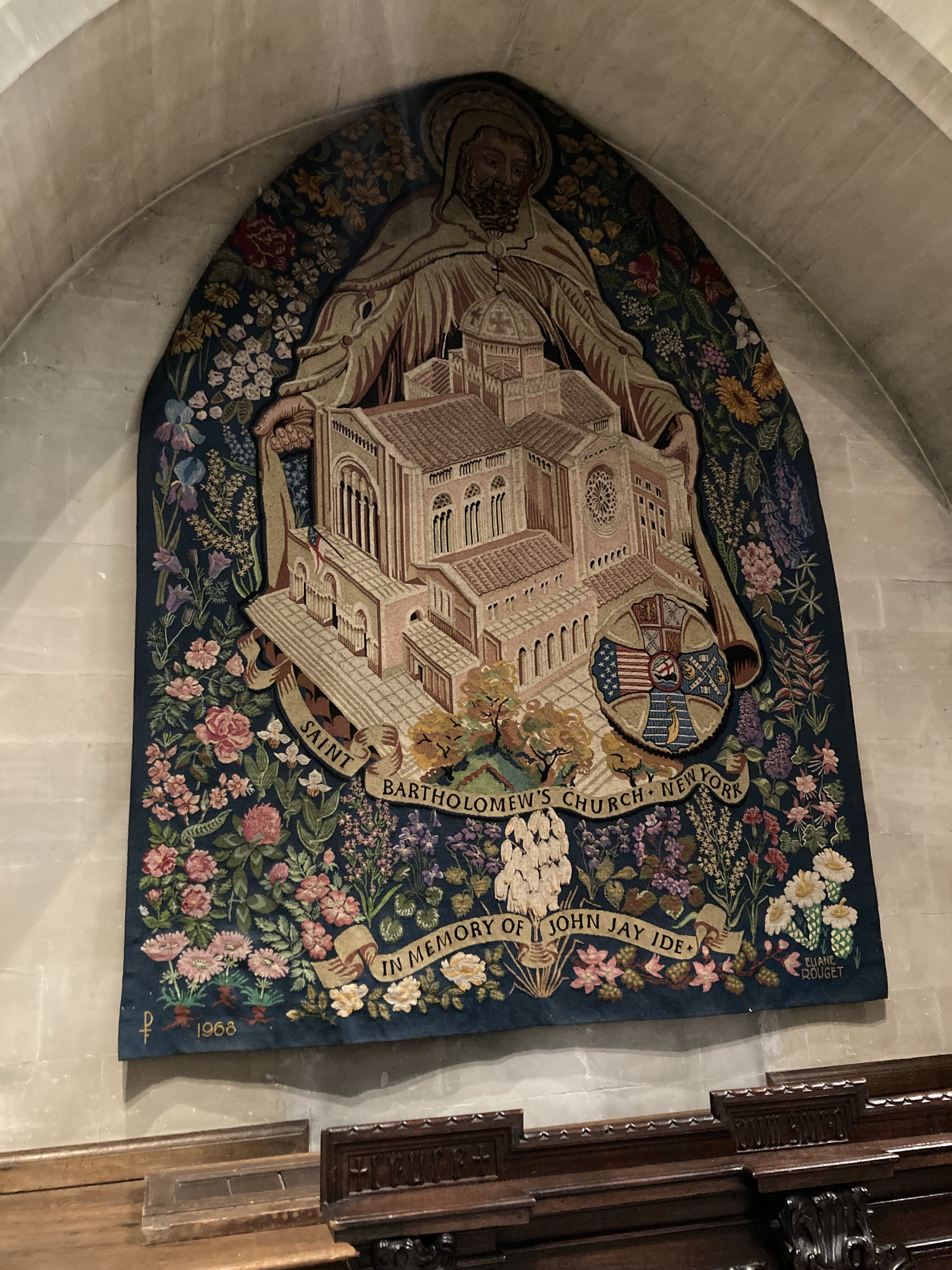
Tapestry of St. Bartholomew's Episcopal Church in Manhattan.

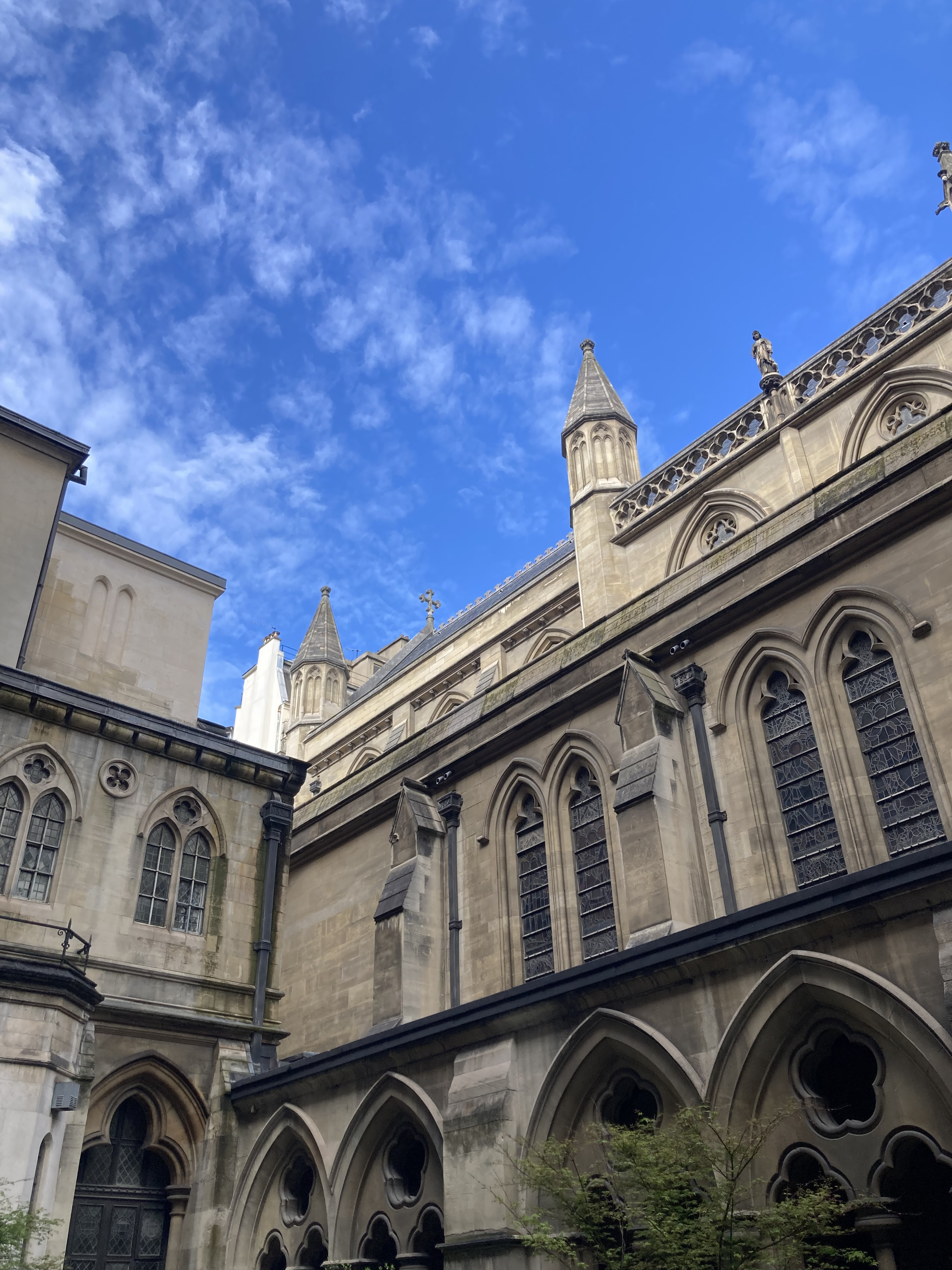
The Courtyard of the American Cathedral in Paris.

== See also ==
- American Church in Paris
- American Church in Berlin
- American Church in Rome
- The Scots Kirk

== Sources ==
- Allen, Cameron (2013). The History of the American Pro-Cathedral of the Holy Trinity, Paris (1815-1980). iUniverse. ISBN 978-1475937824.
