= Genevieve Langdon =

Mechanical engineer

Genevieve S. Langdon is a British mechanical engineer whose research focuses on the effects of explosions on materials and structures. She is Professor of Blast and Impact Engineering in the School of Mechanical, Aerospace and Civil Engineering at the University of Sheffield.

== Education and career ==
Langdon studied engineering at the University of Liverpool, earning both a bachelor's degree and a PhD there. After completing her doctorate in 2003, she joined the University of Cape Town in South Africa in 2004. She gave her inaugural lecture as a full professor in 2017. She became director of the Blast Impact & Survivability Research Unit, and was named head of the Department of Mechanical Engineering, its first female head.

In 2020, she returned to the United Kingdom as Professor of Blast and Impact Engineering in the School of Mechanical, Aerospace and Civil Engineering at the University of Sheffield.

== Recognition ==
The Southern African Association for the Advancement of Science gave Langdon their silver medal for outstanding research by a person under 40 years old. She co-founded the South African Young Academy of Science in 2011. In 2019 she was elected to the Academy of Science of South Africa, and the University of Cape Town named her to its College of Fellows.
