= Convocation of Episcopal Churches in Europe =

Jurisdiction of the Episcopal Church

Diocese of Convocation of Episcopal Churches in Europe

Location
- Territory: Europe
- Ecclesiastical province: Province II

Statistics
- Congregations: 20 (2024)

Information
- Denomination: Episcopal Church
- Established: 1859
- Cathedral: American Cathedral in Paris

Current leadership
- Bishop: Sean Rowe; Mark D. W. Edington (Bishop-in-Charge)

Website
- episcopaleurope.org

The Convocation of Episcopal Churches in Europe (formerly the Convocation of American Churches in Europe) is a jurisdiction of the United States–based Episcopal Church, created in 1859 by an action of its general convention. The convocation includes all Episcopal congregations in continental Europe. Along with dioceses in New York, New Jersey, Haiti, Cuba, Puerto Rico and the Virgin Islands, it belongs to Province II of the Episcopal Church.

The Presiding Bishop of the Episcopal Church has jurisdiction over the convocation but oversight is delegated to a bishop in charge. On April 6, 2019, Mark Edington succeeded the Right Reverend Pierre W. Whalon as bishop in charge, in a consecration and installation ceremony presided over by the presiding bishop, the Most Reverend Michael Curry, at the American Cathedral of the Holy Trinity in Paris.

The convocation currently has an institutional presence in eight European countries: Austria, Belgium, France, Germany, Italy, Switzerland, The Netherlands, and Georgia.

== Parishes ==
The convocation reported 20 congregations in 2024 with an Average Sunday Attendance (ASA) of 852 persons. This was a relative decrease from 990 reported in 2015. It reported 2023 membership of 2,435 persons and 2024 plate and pledge income of $2,118,589.

=== Belgium ===
- All Saints', Waterloo

=== France ===
- Cathedral of the Holy Trinity, Paris
- Christ Church, Clermont-Ferrand

=== Germany ===
- Christ the King, Frankfurt am Main
- Church of the Ascension, Munich
- Church of St Augustine of Canterbury, Wiesbaden

=== Italy ===
- St. James', Florence
- St. Paul's Within the Walls, Rome

=== Switzerland ===
- Emmanuel Church, Geneva

== Missions and other institutions ==
There are also groups known as "missionary congregations" that are not yet full parishes as well as other institutions connected to the convocation. They are located in Austria, Belgium, France, Germany, Italy, Netherlands, and Georgia.

=== Austria ===
- Holy Family Ecumenical Chapel, Mühlbach am Hochkönig

=== Belgium ===
- Christ Church, Charleroi
- St. Esprit, Mons
- St Servais, Namur

=== France ===
- Mission Épiscopale Francophone de la Résurrection, Paris

=== Germany ===
- St. James the Less, Nuremberg
- St. Boniface, Augsburg
- St. Columban's, Karlsruhe
- St. Michael's Church, Thuringia: Weimar

=== Georgia ===
- St. Nino, Tbilisi

=== Italy ===
- Congregacion Latinoamericana – Iglesia San Pablo Dentro de los Muros de Roma - Spanish language ministry in Rome
- Joel Nafuma Refugee Center, Rome
- Santa Maria a Ferrano – retreat center near Florence

=== Netherlands ===
- All Saints, Amsterdam

== Bishops ==
The current bishop is Mark David Wheeler Edington. His immediate predecessor was Pierre Whalon.

- 1916–1923: G. Mott Williams
- 1959–1964: Stephen F. Bayne Jr.
- 1971–1974: Edmond Browning
- 1978–1980: Richard Millard
- 1980–1984: John McGill Krumm
- 1986–1989: Donald Davies
- 1988–1993: Matthew P. Bigliardi
- 1994–2001: Jeffery Rowthorn
- 2001–2019: Pierre Whalon
- Since April 6, 2019: Mark David Wheeler Edington, elected Bishop in Charge of the Convocation of Episcopal Churches in Europe in October 2018. Presiding Bishop Michael Curry ordained and consecrated him on April 6, 2019, at the American Cathedral of the Holy Trinity in Paris.

== Liturgical translations ==
- Le Livre de la prière commune (2022)
- საერთო ლოცვანი ქართულად / the Book of Common Prayer 1979 in Georgian
- Ausgewählte Liturgien aus dem Book of Common Prayer mit Ordnung der Sakramentsfeiern und anderen Riten und Zeremonien der Kirche nach dem Gebrauch der Episkopalkirche
- Liturgie scelte da Il Libro della Preghiera Comune (St. James Church, Florence, 1999)

== See also ==
- Diocese of Gibraltar in Europe - the Church of England's diocese in Europe
