= John Langdon =

John Langdon may refer to:

- John Langdon (bishop) (died 1434), English Bishop of Rochester
- John Langdon (driver) (born 1947), New Zealand harness race driver
- John Langdon (historian) (1944–2016), Canadian historian
- John Langdon (politician) (1741–1819), American politician from New Hampshire
- John Langdon (typographer) (1946–2026), American typographer known for his ambigrams

== See also ==
- John Langdon Down (1828–96), British physician
