= William Chauncy Langdon (1871–1947) =

- Born: April 21, 1871; Florence, Kingdom of Italy
- Died: April 11, 1947 (aged 75); Norwalk, Connecticut, U.S.
- Education: Cornell University; Brown University (AB, AM)
- Occupations: Author; Historian; Pageant writer and producer
- Employers: Brown University (early teaching career); American Red Cross (secretary, NY state executive committee); AT&T Corporation (official historian, 1921–1936)
- Known for: Pioneering work in American historical theatrical pageants
- Notable work: Everyday Things in American Life: 1776–1876
- Spouse: Marion Ames Hatheway (m. 1902)
- Children: William Chauncy Langdon Jr.; Margaret Langdon
- Parents: Rev. William Chauncy Langdon (father); Hannah Courtney Langdon (mother)

William Chauncy Langdon (born Florence, Kingdom of Italy, April 21, 1871; died Norwalk, Connecticut, April 11, 1947) was an American author, historian, and writer and producer of historical theatrical pageants.

== Early life ==
Langdon was the son of Reverend William Chauncy Langdon (1831-1895), a prominent minister and figure in the early history of the YMCA, and his wife Hannah Courtney Langdon (1828-1897). He was born in Florence where his father was serving as a chaplain to the American delegation. His family returned to the United States in 1873 and Langdon attended public schools in Boston and Pennsylvania, then St. John's Academy in Manlius, New York from 1886 to 1888. Langdon attended Cornell University for two years before transferring to Brown University, where his older brother Courtney Langdon (1861-1924) had just become an assistant professor of modern languages. Langdon received an AB at Brown in 1892 and an AM in 1893.

== Career ==
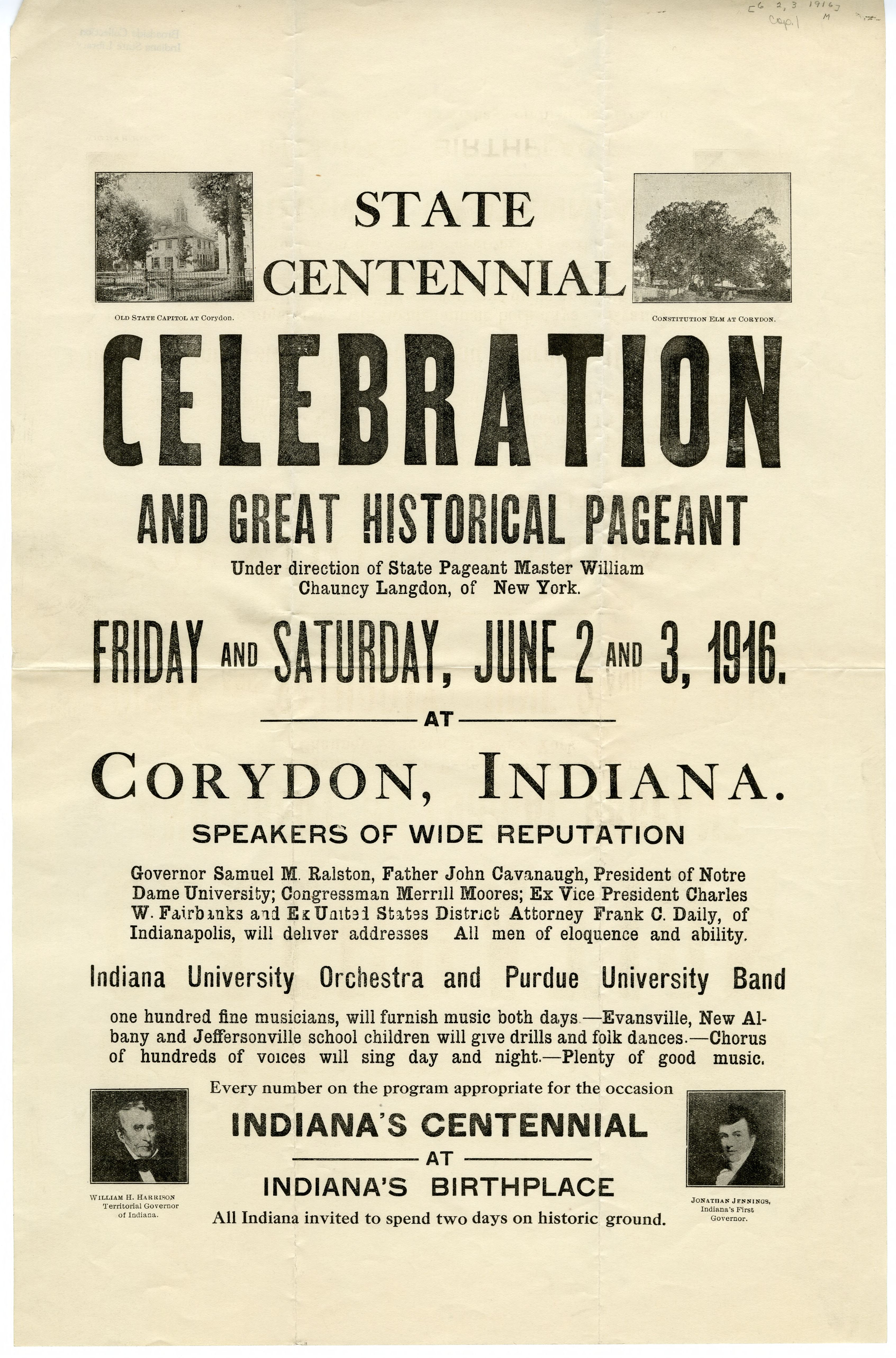
A poster for one of Langdon's pageants, the 1916 Corydon, Indiana state centennial celebration

After receiving his degrees, Langdon taught English at Brown for a year and then worked a number of different academic positions until 1905, when he got a position working as secretary of the executive committee of the American Red Cross in New York state. In 1911 Langdon launched a career as a master of pageants, writing and staging historical pageants, first in New England and then in the Midwest. These events involving hundreds of volunteer participants performing over several days. Langdon has been credited with helping set the conventions of the historical pageant genre. He helped found the American Pageant Association in 1913 and served as its first president 1913-1914. Langdon also wrote and organized a number of other celebrations and convocations and authored a pamphlet on celebrating the Fourth of July.

One of the first pageants organized by Langdon was at Thetford, Vermont. Girls in the town wanted to participate in the pageant but were not organized like the Boy Scout troop in town. Langdon consulted with a local schoolmistress and the owner of a camp for girls on creating an organization for them, and Langdon gave them the name "Camp Fire Girls". The camp owner, Luther Gulick, went on to make Camp Fire into a national organization for girls on the lines of the Boy Scouts.

Langdon wrote the libretto for "Judith", a lyric drama by composer George W. Chadwick which premiered at the Worcester Music Festival September 26, 1901.

From 1921 to 1936 he was the official historian of the American Telephone and Telegraph Company.

In 1937 he published Everyday Things in American Life: 1776-1876, a history of everyday life and objects in two volumes; it was popular enough that it was reprinted several times.

== Family ==
Langdon married Marion Ames Hatheway (1874 - ?) on June 25, 1902 in Boston. They had at least two children, William Chauncy Langdon Jr. and a daughter, Margaret.

== Pageants ==
- "The Pageant of Thetford", Thetford, Vermont (1911)
- St. Johnsbury, Vermont (1912)
- "The Pageant of Meriden: Education in the New Country Life", Meriden, New Hampshire (1913)
- "The Pageant of Darien: The Pageant of a Residential Community", Darien, Connecticut (1913)
- "The Pageant of Cape Cod" in Bourne, Massachusetts (1914)
- "The Pageant of Bloomington and Indiana University", Bloomington, Indiana (1916)
- "The Pageant of Corydon: The Pioneer Capital of Indiana 1816-1916", Corydon, Indiana (1916)
- "The Pageant of Indiana", Indianapolis, Indiana (1916)
- "The Sword of America: A Masque of the War" (Champaign, Illinois
- "The centennial pageant of Auburn Theological Seminary, 1818-1918", Auburn, New York (1918)
- "The Masque of the Titans of Freedom", Urbana-Champaign, Illinois (1918)
- "The Pilgrim tercentenary pageant of Marietta, Ohio" (Marietta, Ohio (1920)
