= Tribune de Genève =

Swiss newspaper

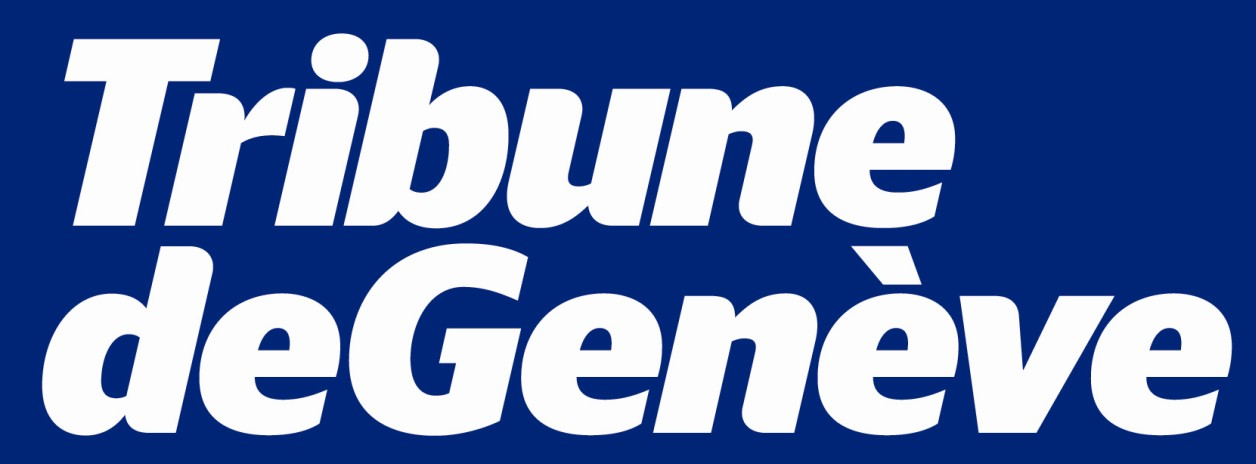

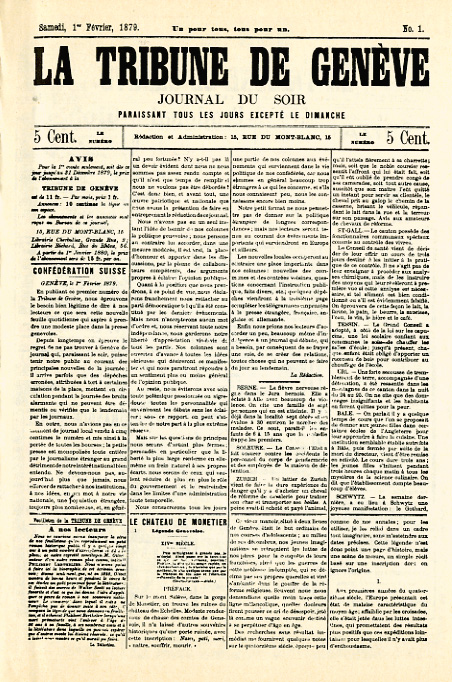
- First edition of Tribune de Genève, 1879
- Type: Daily newspaper
- Format: Berliner
- Owner(s): Tamedia (TX Group)
- Founder: James T. Bates
- Editor: Pierre Ruetschi
- Founded: 1 February 1879; 147 years ago
- Language: French
- Headquarters: 11, rue des Rois; CH-1204 Geneva
- Country: Switzerland
- Circulation: 56,333 (2009)
- Sister newspapers: 24 heures
- ISSN: 1010-2248
- OCLC number: 31882232
- Website: www.tdg.ch

The Tribune de Genève (French pronunciation: [tʁibyn də ʒənɛv]) is a Swiss French-language, regional daily newspaper, published in Berliner format by TX Group in Geneva. It was founded by American businessman James T. Bates in 1879. It collaborates and shares some of its content with 24 heures.

== History and operations ==
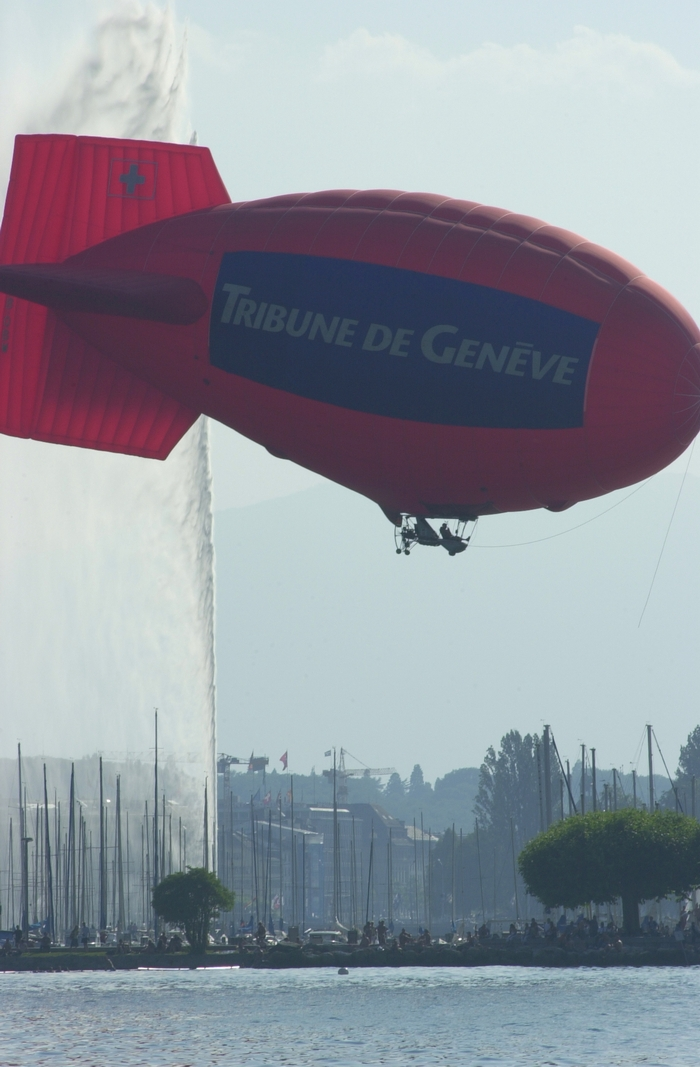
Tribune de Genève Airship

The Tribune de Genève was first published by James T. Bates on 1 February 1879. Bates was an American who had moved to Geneva with his Swiss wife. It published a magazine occasionally and published news from outside the general area, with which it stood out from the other rival papers. The paper is headquartered in Geneva.

Early in its life, it was attached to the Democratic Party (predecessor to the Liberals), but was largely independent of them. The Geneva Typographical Society boycotted the paper from 1909 to 1913, after they dismissed their striking workers. The paper began as an evening paper. Starting 1880 it printed two issues a day, in 1882 three or four, before shifting to five. From 1956 it printed one issue in the evening. Since 1990 it has had a single morning edition. It was directed by Alfred Bouvier from its creation to 1911, who was then succeeded by Edouard Bauty and then Edgar Junod; the director role was split with the role of editor-in-chief being filled by Gaston Bridel and Junod remaining director.

As of 2004, it was the best selling French daily in Switzerland. The circulation of the Tribune de Genève was 67,151 copies in 2006. The newspaper had a circulation of 67,151 copies and a readership of 175,000 as of 2007. In 2009 the circulation of the paper was 56,333 copies. In 2010 the circulation was 54,068 copies. It covers both news local to Geneva and nationwide news. It collaborates and shares some of its content with 24 heures, a regional newspaper for the Canton of Vaud. The two papers share an internet platform. It was bought by Edipresse in 1991, who owned 95% of the shares. It was sold to Tamedia (later TX Group) in 2011. In 2024, Tamedia made plans to merge the editorial offices of the publication with other publications it owned, Le Matin and the 24 heures.

== Organization ==
=== Editor-in-chief ===
- Gaston Bridel (1938–1960)
- Georges-Henri Martin (1961–1982)
- Daniel Cornu (1982–1992)
- Guy Mettan (1992–1998)
- Marco Cattaneo (1998–2000)
- Dominique von Burg (2000–2006)
- Pierre Ruetschi (2006–)
