= Guy Mettan =

Swiss journalist and politician

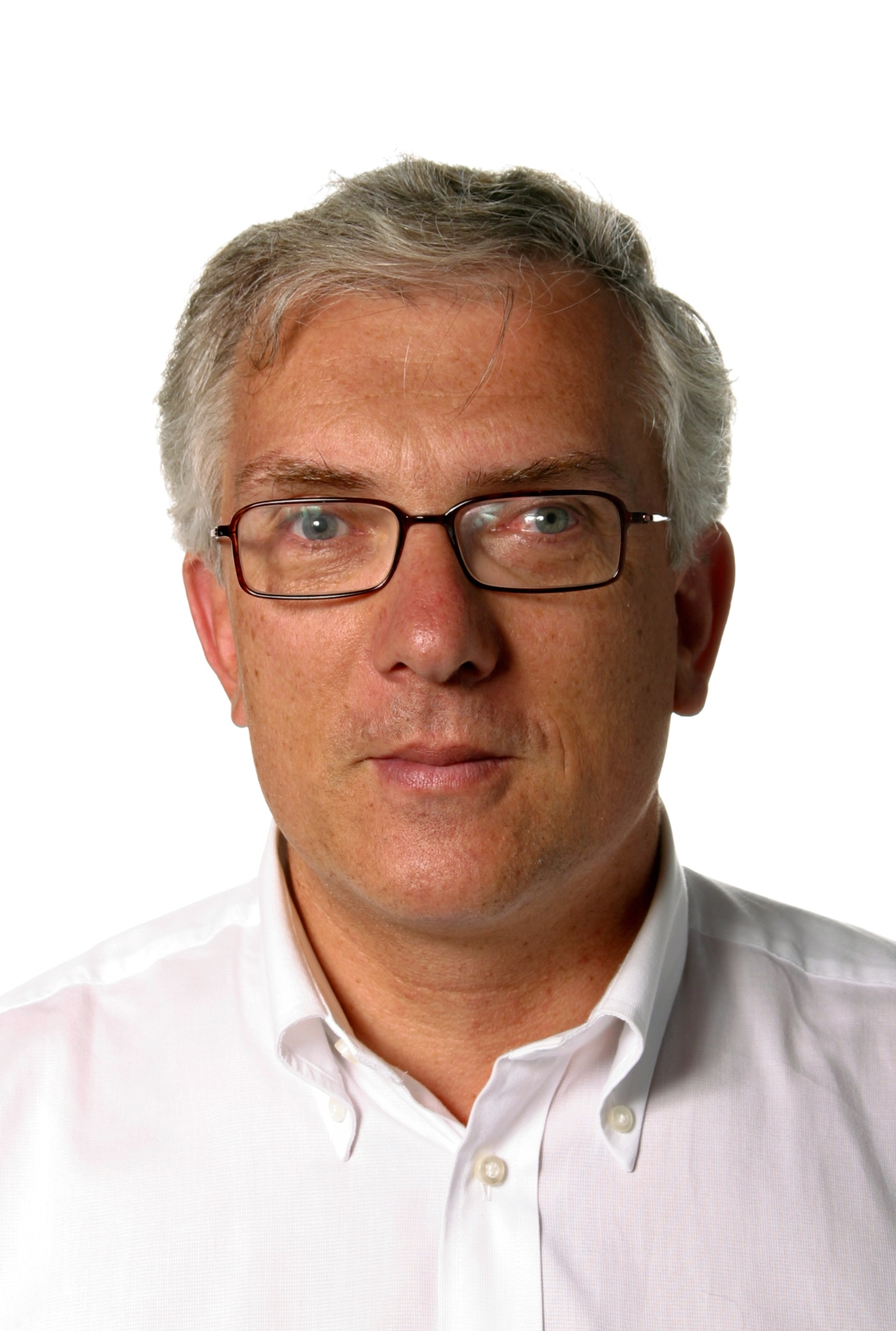
Guy Mettan

Guy Mettan (born 19 November 1956 in Evionnaz) is a Swiss journalist and politician.

== Career ==
Guy Mettan was a member of the Christian Democratic People's Party of Switzerland before becoming a member of the Swiss People's Party.

As a journalist Mettan started with Tribune de Genève as an intern and was its director and editor-in-chief from 1992 to 1998. 1997 he co-founded the Geneva Press Club and was executive director until 2019.

In 2001 he was appointed Vice-President of the Swiss-West African Chamber of Commerce. Mettan has been president of the Swiss-Russian Chamber of Commerce since its inception in 2005. From 2006 to 2014 he was President of the Geneva Section of the Red Cross Switzerland. He also served as President of the Grand Council of Geneva and sat for the center there until 2019.

In his 2019 book Europe's Existential Dilemma, Mettan criticises European subordination to the United States as a major factor for stifling the continent. He argues in favour of new institutions for European integration and of using China's challenge to American hegemony as an opportunity to create European sovereignty.

Mettan was awarded the Russian medal of the Order of Friendship in February 2017 by President Vladimir Putin. Parliamentary regulations require elected officials to receive authorization before receiving decorations from foreign governments and the Grand Council of Geneva authorised him to receive the medal on a 36-35 vote.

Mettan's journalistic credibility has been questioned on several occasions. In 2017, Reporters Without Borders criticised Mettan for his pro-Russian views accusing him of serving as a mouthpiece for Russian propaganda. Florian Irminger, Secretary General of the Swiss Green Party, also called Mettan an apologist for Putin's government. On the 9 of April 2022, Daniel Binswanger wrote an article on Mettan in Swiss magazine Republik' called "The Truth about Bucha" in which he accused Mettan of being a "Kremlin propagandist", referring to one of his essays as a "breathtaking compendium" of Russian propaganda.

== Personal life ==
Mettan is married. In 1994, the family adopted a three-year-old Russian girl, Oxana, from an orphanage in Suzdal. Later, Russian citizenship was granted to Mettan as a result of the adoption due to a decree by the Yeltsin administration.

== Books ==
- 2004: Genève, ville de paix: de la Conférence de 1954 sur l'Indochine à la coopération internationale
- 2010: Guy Mettan, Christophe Büchi, Le dictionnaire impertinent de la Suisse
- 2014: Guy Mettan, François Bugnion, Jean-François Pitteloud, Serge Nessi, Philippe Bender, Serge Bimpag, 150 ans de passion humanitaire, la Croix-Rouge genevoise de 1864 à 2014, Genève, Slatkine, ISBN 9782832106044
- 2017: Creating Russophobia: From the Great Religious Schism to Anti-Putin Hysteria
  - 2016: (Italian language edition) Russofobia. Mille anni di diffidenza
- 2019: Le continent perdu. Plaidoyer pour une Europe démocratique et souveraine, Éditions des Syrtes ISBN 9782940628148
  - 2021: (English-language edition) Europe's Existential Dilemma, Clarity Press ISBN 978-1949762402
