= Thomas Langdon (MP) =

English politician

Thomas Langdon (died c. 1433), of Canterbury, Kent, was an English politician.

== Family ==
Langdon was married and had one daughter. Neither of their names are recorded. His brother was John Langdon, bishop of Rochester.

== Career ==
He was a Member (MP) of the Parliament of England for Canterbury in December 1421.
