= Matthew P. Bigliardi =

American bishop

Matthew Paul Bigliardi
- Born: September 14, 1920; Charleroi, Pennsylvania, US
- Died: February 26, 1996 (aged 75)
- Occupation: seventh bishop of the Episcopal Diocese of Oregon

Matthew Paul Bigliardi (September 14, 1920 - February 26, 1996) was seventh bishop of the Episcopal Diocese of Oregon, consecrated in 1973. He served from 1974 to 1985. He later served as bishop in charge of the Convocation of Episcopal Churches in Europe from 1988 to 1993.
