= Pierre Whalon =

Bishop of the Convocation of Episcopal Churches in Europe

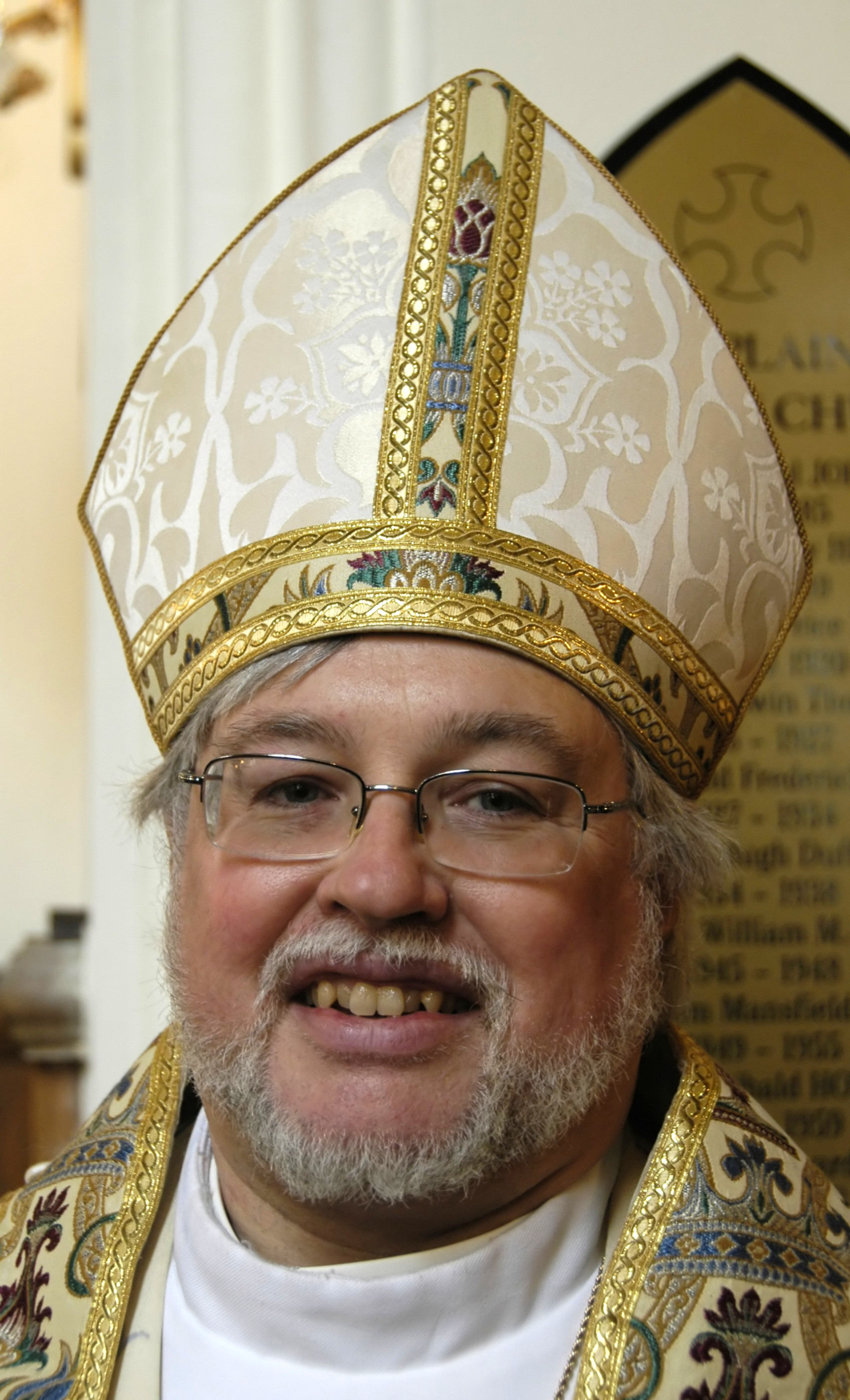
Whalon in 2007

Pierre Welté Whalon (born November 12, 1952) is an author and retired American bishop. He was the bishop in charge of the Convocation of Episcopal Churches in Europe until April 2019. He was consecrated as a bishop on November 18, 2001. He was born in Newport, Rhode Island. He has been a guest columnist for Anglicans Online.

== See also ==
- Historical list of bishops of the Episcopal Church in the United States of America

== Bibliography ==
- Made in Heaven?: How God Acts in Marriage (2016) ISBN 9781520150840
- (contributor) When Churches in Communion Disagree (Living Church Books, 2022) ISBN 9798840051825
- Attentive, Intelligent, Rational, and Responsible: Transforming Economics to Save the Planet (Marquette University Press, 2023) ISBN 9781626000605
- Choose the Narrow Path: The Way for Churches to Walk Together, Studies in Episcopal and Anglican Theology (Peter Lang, 2023) ISBN 9781433196386
