= Province 2 of the Episcopal Church =

Ecclesiastical province of the Episcopal Church in the USA

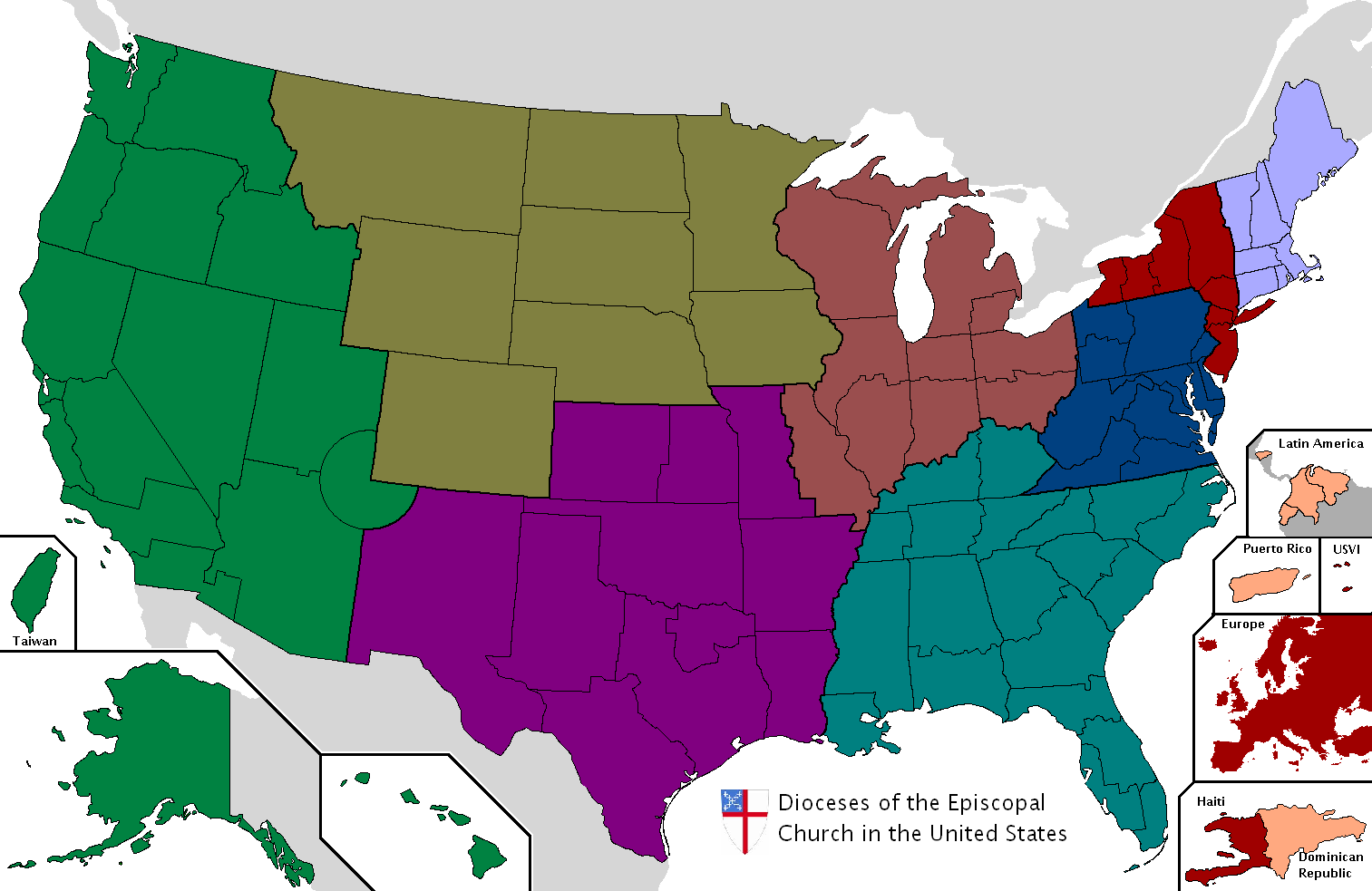
Province II of the ECUSA

Province 2 (II), also called the Atlantic Province, is one of nine ecclesiastical provinces making up the Episcopal Church in the United States of America. It comprises the six dioceses of the State of New York, the two dioceses of the State of New Jersey, the diocese in the Republic of Haiti and the diocese in the Virgin Islands (including both the British and the US Virgin Islands), the Episcopal Diocese of Cuba, and the Convocation of Episcopal Churches in Europe. Bishop DeDe Duncan-Probe of the Diocese of Central New York serves as president and the Venerable Walter Baer of the Convocation of Episcopal Churches in Europe serves as vice president.

Statistically, the province reported 302,529 members in 2015 and 264,640 members in 2023; no membership statistics were reported in 2024 national parochial reports. Plate and pledge income for the 1,077 filing congregations of the province in 2024 was $121,371,654. Average Sunday attendance (ASA) in 2024 was 58,881 persons. This was a decrease from ASA of 84,875 in 2015.

== Dioceses of Province II ==
- Diocese of Albany
- Diocese of Central New York
- Diocese of Cuba
- Diocese of Haiti
- Diocese of Long Island
- Diocese of New Jersey
- Diocese of New York
- Diocese of Newark
- Diocese of Puerto Rico
- Diocese of Rochester
- Diocese of the Virgin Islands
- Diocese of Western New York

== Other jurisdictions of Province II ==
- Convocation of Episcopal Churches in Europe
