= Alberto Cutié =

Catholic priest turned Episcopalian priest

The Very Reverend Alberto R. Cutié
- Rector of St Benedict's Church
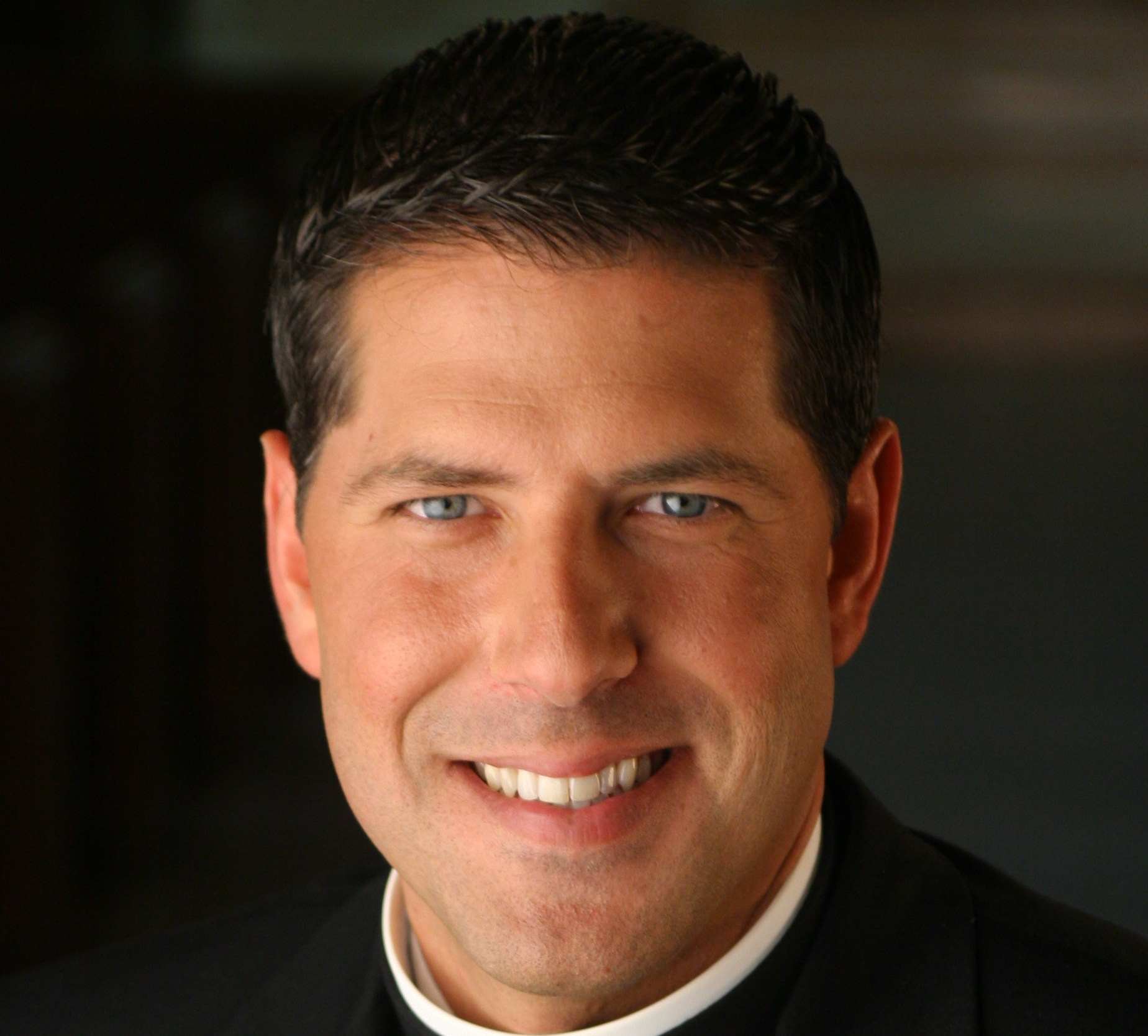
- Church: Episcopal Church
- Diocese: Southeast Florida
- In office: 2010-present

Orders
- Ordination: May 13, 1995 by John Favalora

Personal details
- Born: April 29, 1969 (age 57) San Juan, Puerto Rico
- Denomination: Anglican (Prev. Roman Catholic)
- Spouse: Ruhama Buni Canellis
- Children: 2

Alberto R. Cutié (born April 29, 1969, in San Juan, Puerto Rico), also known as Padre Alberto, is a Cuban-American Episcopal priest and media host. He was ordained as a Catholic priest in 1995 but left the Catholic Church in 2009 after publication of photographs showing him with a woman at the beach and his subsequent admission that he was in love.

Cutié has said that mandatory celibacy was only one of the theological differences that led him to leave the Catholic Church. He later married Ruhama Buni Canellis and joined the Episcopal Church.

== Media appearances ==
Cutié, the middle child and son of Cuban exiles, was born in San Juan, Puerto Rico. As a teenager he worked as a DJ.

He was ordained a Catholic priest for the Archdiocese of Miami in 1995, the first ordinand of the then-newly designated Archbishop John Favalora (retired 2010). He is a regular columnist whose writings appear in Spanish language newspapers throughout the United States and Latin America. He made his television debut in 1999 as the host of Padre Alberto (and later Cambia tu Vida con el Padre Alberto), a daily talk show televised on the Telemundo network.

Beginning in 2002, Cutié hosted a weekly talk program called Hablando Claro con el Padre Alberto, reaching millions of households throughout the United States, Canada, Spain and Latin America on EWTN Español, which is part of the global network founded by Mother Angelica. In July 2003 he officiated at Celia Cruz's Funeral Mass in Miami, Florida.

Cutié also published his first self-help book, Real Life, Real Love (Ama de Verdad, Vive de Verdad) in January 2006. It sold thousands of copies and became a bestseller in the Spanish language market. His second book, Dilemma: A Priest's Struggle with Faith and Love (Dilema: La Lucha de un Sacerdote Entre Su Fe y el Amor), was released on January 4, 2011. He has been labeled as "Father Oprah" by various publications. He was president and general director of Radio Paz and Radio Peace Catholic 24-hour radio station from January 2001. He hosted several radio programs, such as Al Dia and Linea Directa, and directed the daily operations of Pax Catholic Communications for the Archdiocese of Miami until 2009.

== Personal life ==
On May 5, 2009, Cutié asked church officials for a time of reflection and a leave of absence from his media programs and pastoral work after publication of pictures in which he was shown kissing and touching Ruhama Buni Canellis at a public beach while still a Catholic priest. Cutié asked the Archdiocese of Miami for some time to think and make a decision on where his life as a priest was heading. As a result, the Archdiocese of Miami granted him a leave of absence for an undefined period of personal decision making. After meeting with two of his bishops and informing them of his decision, he chose to continue his ministry as a married priest in the Episcopal Church, part of the Anglican Communion.

On May 11, 2009, Cutié was interviewed by Maggie Rodriguez of CBS' The Early Show. He said that he was thinking about leaving the Catholic Church for a woman he loves. He said that he respected the existing rule of mandatory celibacy and acknowledged that some priests remain dedicated to that calling. There are many priests in communion with the Vatican who are married, but they are mostly members of the Eastern Catholic Churches. He stated he did not want to become the "anti-celibacy priest".

On May 13, 2009, Cutié was interviewed by Teresa Rodríguez on the Univision show Aquí y Ahora. He said: "I do regret if my actions hurt people with all my heart", adding "[t]here are other ways to serve God. I am not the same man I was when I entered the seminary 22 years ago." By the end of the month Cutié announced that he had been in the process of discerning entering the Episcopal Church for the last couple of years, which in turn helped him consolidate marriage and his calling to serve God.

On July 11, 2011, Cutié aired his first English-speaking syndicated daytime talk show, Father Albert. The show was produced by Debmar-Mercury, the same company that syndicates South Park and Family Feud as a summer test-run.

Father Albert returned to daily radio with Univision in March 2020, during the COVID-19 pandemic with a daily call-in Talk-Show which had a huge reception by the Latino audience. In 2021, he returned to daytime television with a new version of his long-time Talk-Show "Hablando Claro con el Padre Alberto" on Mega TV, part of the Spanish Broadcasting System (SBS) conglomerate of radio and television stations.

== Reception into the Episcopal Church and marriage ==
Cutié was received into the Episcopal Church on May 28, 2009, by the Right Reverend Leo Frade, the Cuban-born bishop of the Episcopal Diocese of Southeast Florida and became the administrator and pastoral minister of the Episcopal Church of the Resurrection in Biscayne Park, Miami, Florida, where he was licensed as a pastoral assistant. He was received as an Episcopal priest and instituted as priest-in-charge of the parish on May 29, 2010. Cutié is now rector of St. Benedict's Parish in Plantation, Florida.

== Personal life ==
On June 26, 2009, Cutié and Ruhama Buni Canellis married in a church ceremony at St. Bernard de Clairvaux Church in North Miami Beach. Bishop Frade officiated, assisted by the Right Reverend Onell Soto (retired Episcopal Bishop of Venezuela) and several other Episcopal clergy. He and his wife have two children.
