= Kadapra =

Village in Thiruvalla subdistrict, Kerala, India

- Village
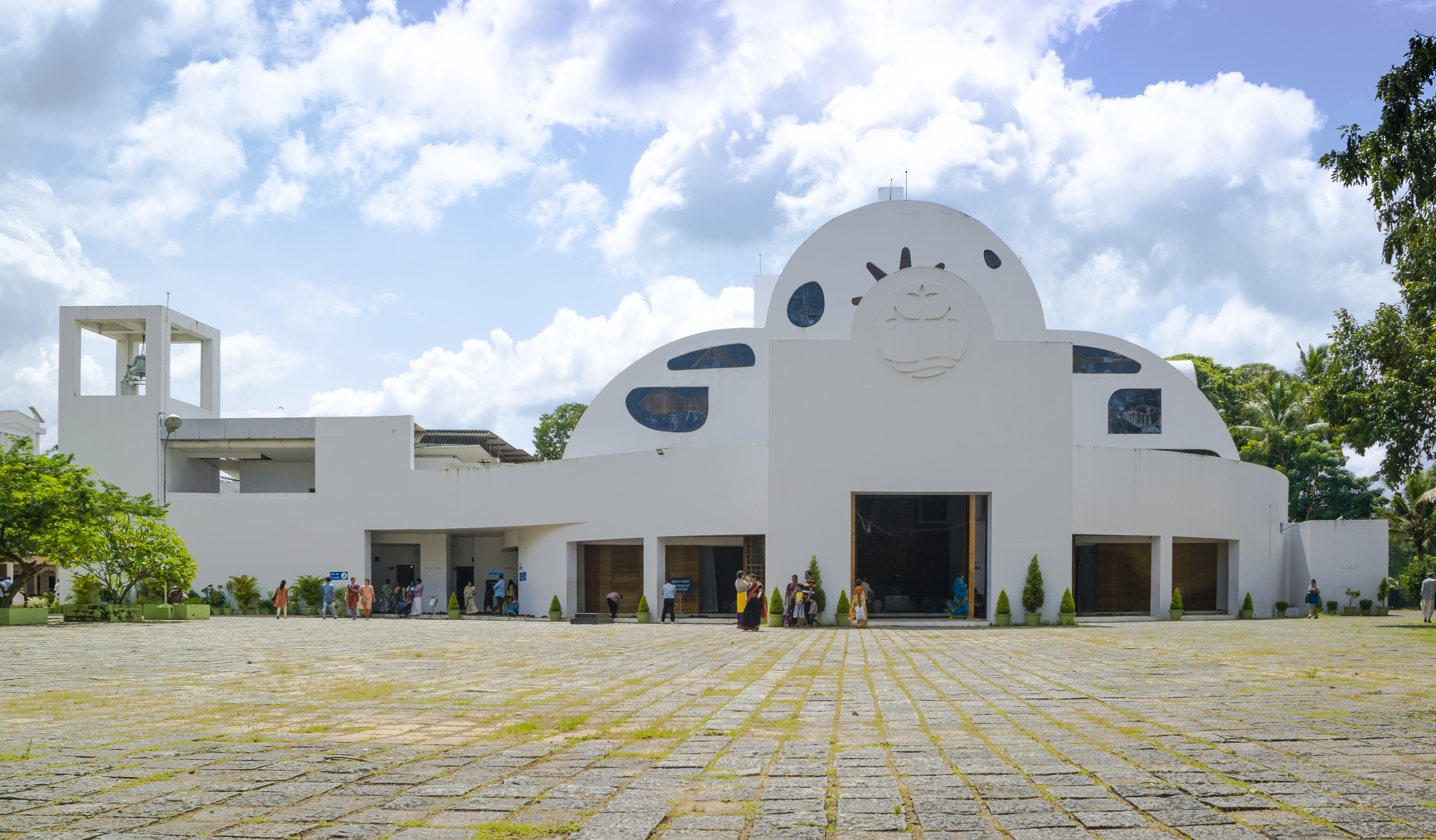
- Parumala Church
- Interactive map of Kadapra
- Coordinates: 9°20′37″N 76°32′5″E
- Country: India
- State: Kerala
- District: Pathanamthitta
- Subdistrict: Thiruvalla

Area
  - Total: 14.74 km^{2} (5.69 sq mi)

Population (2011)
  - Total: 23,502

Languages
  - Official: Malayalam; English
- Time zone: UTC+5:30 (IST)
- Vehicle registration: KL-27 (Thiruvalla)

Kadapra (Malayalam: കടപ്ര) is a village in the Thiruvalla subdistrict of Pathanamthitta district, Kerala state, India. It shares an intradistrict river border with Nedumpuram village separated along the Manimala river towards its north and an interpenetrating intradistrict land border with Niranam village towards its west.

All interdistrict borders are river borders shared with parts of Alappuzha district of which the border with Thalavady towards its northwest is separated by streams of the Manimala river. All other interdistrict river borders are formed by Pampa river which splits into three, near to the east of the village. One of the splits flows northwest and immediately merges with Manimala river forming a border with Thiruvanvandoor towards its northeast. The other two splits forms its island of Parumala of which the outer split shares a border with Pandanad, Ennakkad and Mannar towards its southeast. After merging, the splits flows westard sharing a border with Kurattissery towards the south of the village and Veeyapuram towards its southwest.

The village has a total area of 14.74 km^{2} (3,640 acres) and as per the 2011 census data, it has a total population of 23,502 of which 10,810 are males and 12,692 are females. The average sex ratio is 1174 which is higher than Kerala state average of 1084. The literacy rate stands at 96.94 percentage.

The State Highway 6 forms the skeleton of transportation through the village which enters through Pulikeezhu bridge across the Manimala river from Nedumpuram, passing north–south and exits through Parumala bridge across Pampa river towards Mannar. Buses of the state transport corporation and private ownership connecting Thiruvalla with Kayamkulam via Mavelikkara passes through this segment of road. The Eramallikkara bridge directly connect the village with Thiruvanvandoor and Illimala bridge directly connect its island of Parumala with Pandanad.

== Background ==
=== Travancore Sugars and Chemicals Limited ===
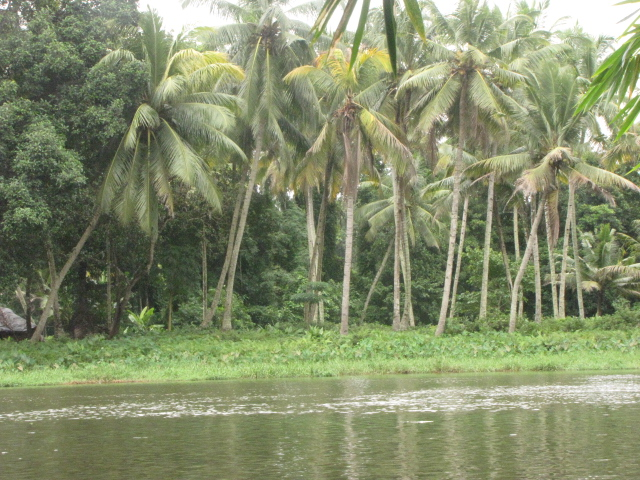
River Pampa near Thulissala koyikkal

The Travancore Sugars and Chemicals Limited (TSCL) is a state government company which was incorporated in 1937 with registered office and factory in Valanjavattom and commenced commercial production in 1948. The company then owned by M/s Parry & Co. had three divisions; Sugar division, Distillery division and Blending-Bottling division. Government of Kerala overtook the company in 1974 and the sugar division was closed in 1998 due to the non-availability of sugarcane, which was used to be cultivated in large scale in the village at the time of its establishment.

The company is currently engaged in the manufacturing of Indian Made Foreign Liquor (IMFL) only and is sold through Kerala State Beverages Corporation (KSBC), a company owned by Government of Kerala. It also produces and sells rectified spirit, methylated spirit and Extra Neutral Alcohol (ENA) to various establishments including medical colleges, hospitals, research institutions, Indian Space Research Organisation (ISRO) and Regional Cancer Centre (RCC).

=== St. Peter's and St. Paul's Church, Parumala ===
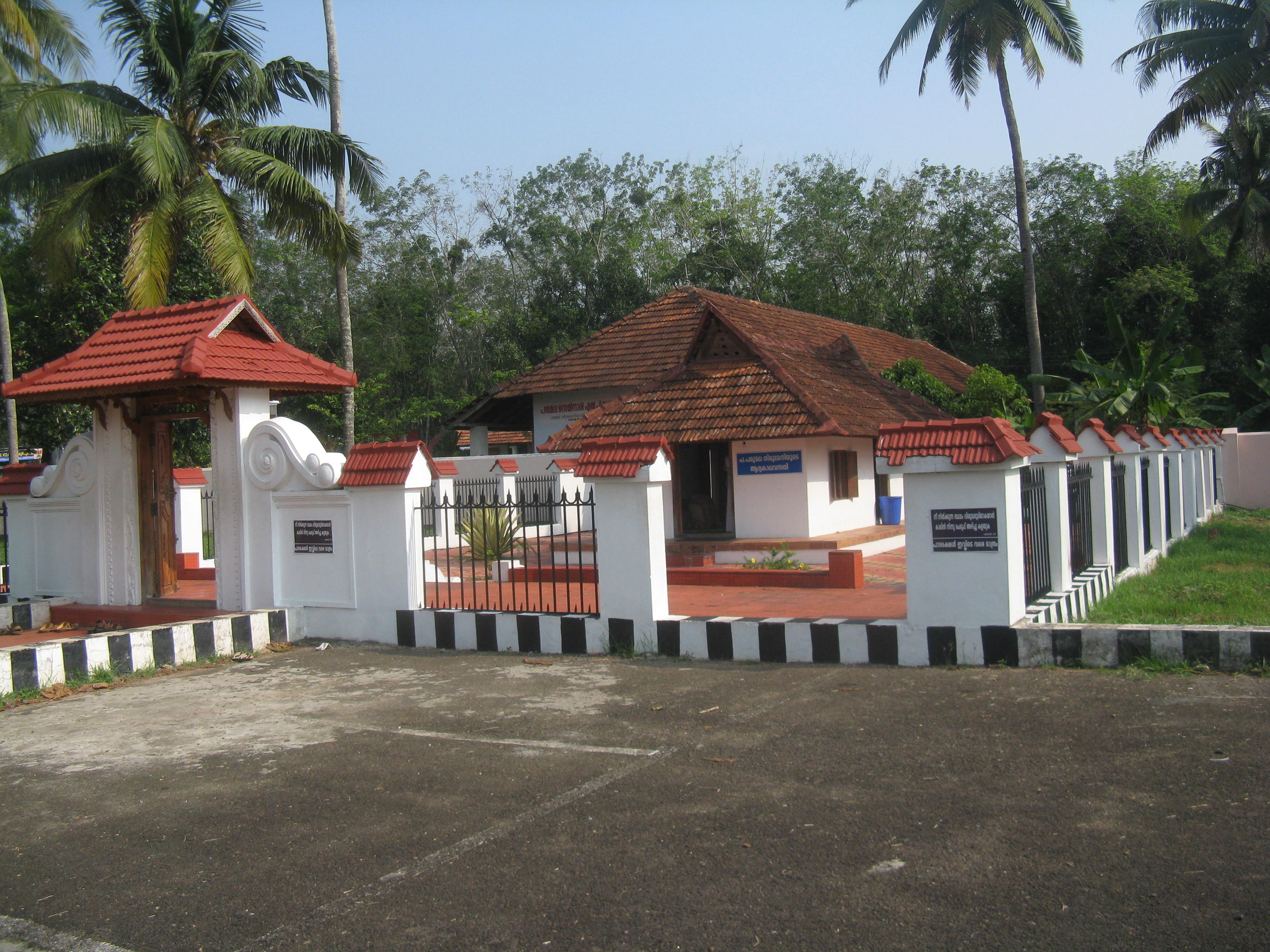
Azhippura as seen in April 2012

In 1872, the then Metropolitan of Malankara, Joseph Mar Dionysius established a seminary in the island of Parumala to train the students of Malankara church. The metropolitan and the students used to live in an old building called Azhipura which is still conserved. The land also had a church built by the Arikupurathu family of its owner, Mathen Karnavar.

Mar Dionysius invited the Chorbishop of Vettickal St. Thomas Dayara, Geevarghese Mar Gregorios to Parumala and given him the title of Ramban (monk-priest). Geevarghese later succeeded as the Metropolitan of Malankara and inherited the existing old church and the land after the death of Mathen Karnavar. He renovated the church as a result of his long term effort. He was canonized by the church after his death and the Parumala church became one of the prominent pilgrimage centers in Kerala. At the end of the last century, the church was extensively renovated to accommodate the large number of pilgrims and the present church at Parumala was designed by renowned architect Charles Correa.

=== Parumala Valiya Panayannarkavu Devi Temple ===
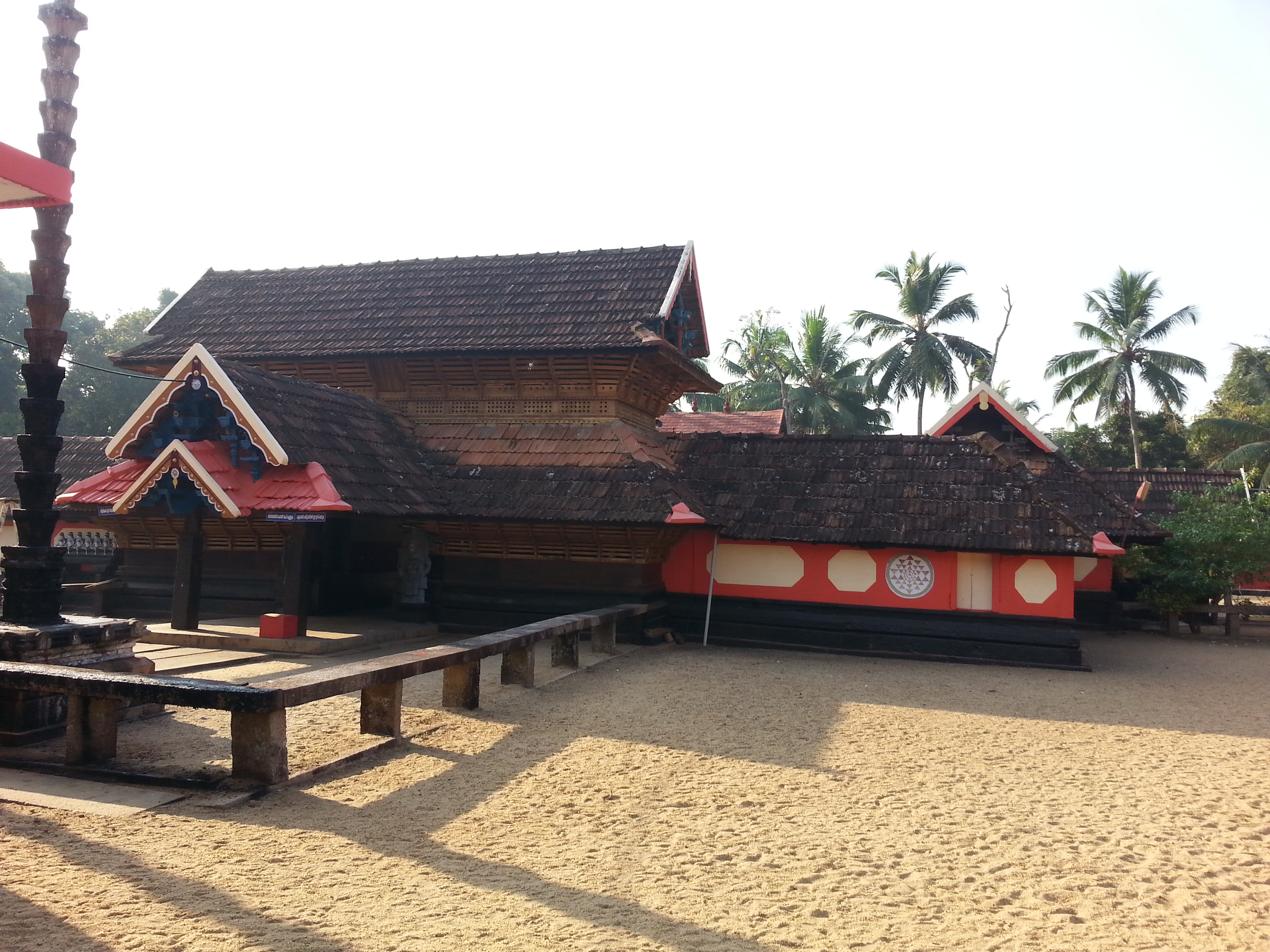
Kizhakkenada of the temple

Parumala Valiya Panayannarkavu Devi Temple is an ancient Hindu temple dedicated to Sri Badrakali and Lord Shiva, situated on the banks of the Pampa river at Parumala. The Panaynararkavu Temple is one of the three most important Bhadrakali temples in Kerala along with Thirumandhamkunnu Temple in Malabar and Kodungallur Temple in Cochin.

The collection of mural paintings of the temple is very famous in India that the murals are precision and suitable color combinations for linear accuracy. The age of these paintings are hard to find. However it is believed that these crystal structure happened in two stages where frescoes surrounding the rectangular main shrine were early paintings and paintings on the square sanctum sanctorum were completed later. It is believed that temple murals were completed in the period of the last king of the Odanad Royal House. During this period, the Vaishnava customs and the practice of pure worship were made in a more colorful, ceremonial way.

=== Thomathukadavu and Thomas the Apostle ===
According to local tradition, around AD 52, Thomas the Apostle arrived in Niranam through Kottachal an ancient and important water way of early days and landed at Thomathukadavu, which is now located on northwestern part of Kadapra village. Through the ministry of the word and miraculous deeds, he brought many high class hindus to Christian faith. He baptized them at Nerkadavu located adjacent to the Niranam Jerusalem Mar Thoma Church. The first Christians of Niranam were from four families; Pattamukku, Thayyil, Maankki and Madathilan.

== Overview ==
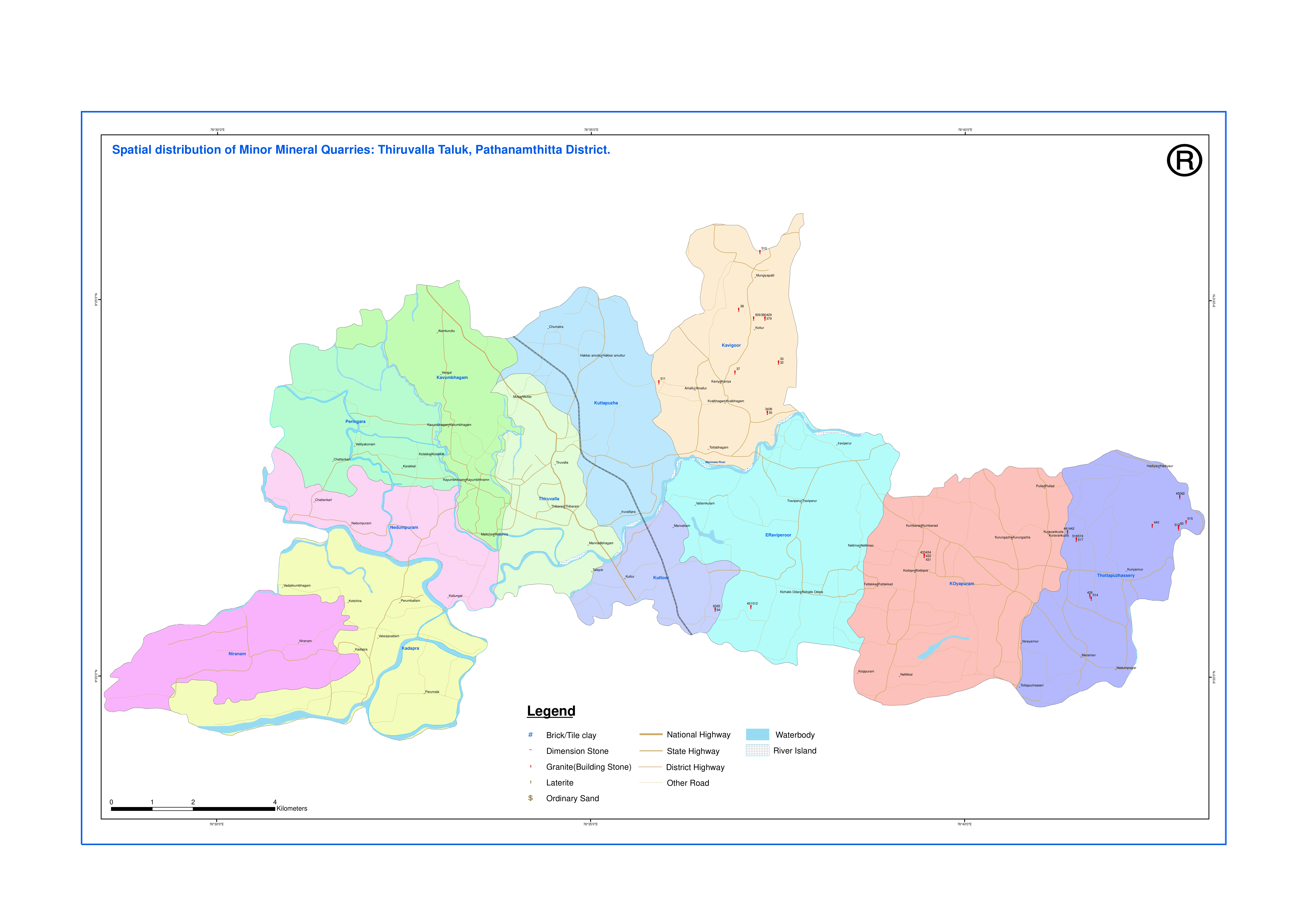
Thiruvalla subdistrict map with Kadapra village shown in pale yellow. Note: Map of Department of Mining and Geology, Government of Kerala

Kadapra Grama Panchayat
- Block Office: Pulikeezhu; Contact Details
- Village Office: Official Website
- LSG Election Data: SEC Website; Official Website

On Grama Panchayat level, it includes 15 wards and is listed below according to their ward number.

1. Valanjavattom
2. Sugar Factory
3. Alumthuruthy East
4. Valanjavattom East
5. Thikkapuzha
6. Upadesikadavu
7. Illimala
8. Uzhathil
9. Hospital Ward
10. Kadapra
11. Kadapra South
12. Kadapra Mannar
13. Theveri
14. Kadapra West
15. Alumthuruthy

India Post offices within the village and their Postal Index Number is listed below.

1. Valanjavattom SO - 689 104
2. Valanjavattom East BO - 689 104
3. Vadakkumbhagom BO (Niranam North) - 689 621
4. Niranam SO - 689 621
5. Parumala SO - 689 626
6. Kadapra Mannar BO - 689 621

== Notable sites ==
Churches
Sl. No	Name	References
01	St. George Orthodox Church, Valanjavattom	
02	St. Mary's Orthodox Church, Valanjavattom	
03	St. Mary's Orthodox Church, Valanjavattom East	
04	Ebenezer Mar Thoma Church, Pulikeezhu	
05	St. Pauls C.S.I Church, Valanjavattom	
06	St. Mary's Malankara Syriac Catholic Church, Alumthuruthi	
07	St. Mary's Orthodox Church, Parumala	
08	St. Thomas Orthodox Church, Parumala	
09	St. Mary's Orthodox Church (Mannar Marthamariam)	
10	St. Peters and St. Pauls Orthodox Church, Parumala	

Temples
Sl. No	Name	References
01	Umayaattu Kavu Devi Temple	
02	Thondukulangara Devi Temple	
03	Yogeeswara Temple, Valanjavattom East	
04	Manappuram Shiva Temple, Valanjavattom East, Kadapra	
05	Perumballathu Mahadeva Temple, Valanjavattom East	
06	Kadapra Alamthuruthy Bhagavathy Temple, Valanjavattom	
07	Ulabhethu Sreekrishna Temple, Kadapra	
08	Alumood Temple, Parumala, Thiruvalla	
09	Mahalakshminada Temple, Kadapra	
10	Parumala Valiya Panayannarkavu Devi Temple	

Schools
Sl. No	Name	References
01	KVUPS Valanjavattom	
02	Kannasa Smaraka Govt. Higher Secondary School, Kadapra	
03	Stella Maris English Medium School, Alamthuruthi	
04	Kadapra Government UP School	
05	Devaswom Board Higher Secondary School, Parumala	
06	Syndesmos Public School, Parumala	
07	MSM UP School, Niranam	
08	Mozhassery MD LP School, Kadapra	
09	KVLPS Parumala	
10	Sree Devi English Medium School, Valanjavattom	

Hospitals
Sl. No	Name	References
01	Kadapra Government Homoeo Dispensary	
02	S.N Hospital, Kadapra	
03	Primary Health Centre, Kadapra	
04	Parumala Medical Mission Multispeciality Hospital (NABH)	

Colleges
Sl. No	Name	Affiliation	References
01	Devaswom Board Pampa College, Parumala	Mahatma Gandhi University	
02	Parumala Mar Gregorios College, Valanjavattom	Mahatma Gandhi University	
03	Central University of Kerala, Department of Law, Thiruvalla Campus	Central University of Kerala	

== See also ==
- Niranam
- Thiruvalla taluk
- Alappuzha district
- Pathanamthitta district
