= Angela Cortiñas =

Angela Maria Cortiñas is a Cuban American bishop in the Episcopal Church, currently serving as Bishop Suffragan of West Texas, having previously worked in parishes in Florida and Texas.

== Family and education ==
Born in Florida to Cuban immigrants, Cortiñas grew up in Miami with seven siblings. She graduated from the Seminary of the Southwest in 2010.

She is the mother of one daughter.

== Career ==
Cortiñas was ordained as a deacon in 2009 and as a priest in 2010. She worked in the Episcopal Diocese of Southeast Florida as an associate priest at All Saints Episcopal Church in Fort Lauderdale (2010−2012) and as associate rector at St. Gregory’s Episcopal Church in Boca Raton (2012−2017). After moving to the Episcopal Diocese of Texas, she was rector of St. Thomas Episcopal Church in College Station from 2017 to 2021 and associate rector of St. David's Episcopal Church in Austin from 2021 to 2024.

On October 19, 2024, Cortiñas was elected to serve as Bishop Suffragan of West Texas. On March 15, 2025, she was consecrated by the Presiding Bishop of the Episcopal Church, Sean Rowe, at a service held at St. John’s Episcopal Church in McAllen, Texas.
