= Pandanad =

Pandanad Pandavar Nadu
- village
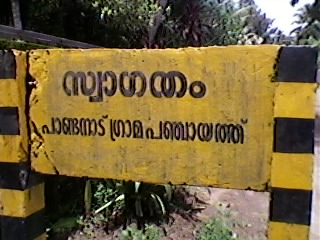

- Location within Kerala Location within India
- Coordinates: 9°20′17.883″N 76°34′36.3612″E
- Country: India
- State: Kerala
- Taluk: Chengannur

Government
  - Type: Panchayat

Area
  - Total: 3.97 sq mi (10.29 km^{2})

Population (2011)
  - Total: 11,489
  - Density: 3,107/sq mi (1,199.8/km^{2})
- (Will be higher in 2011)
- Time zone: UTC+5.30 (IST)
- Post code: 689124, 689506
- Area code: 0479
- Vehicle Code: (KL-30)
- Website: alappuzha.gov.in

Pandanadu (also known as Pandavar Nadu) is a village in Chengannur taluk in Alappuzha district, in Kerala, India. According to the 2011 Indian census, Pandanadu has a population of 11489 people.

== Geography ==
A major portion of the village is located on the banks of the Pampa River. The river divides the village into two; Pandanad North and Pandanad West. Pandanad West is 4 km (2 mi) from Chengannur, the nearest town, and 4 km (2 mi) from Mannar. Pandanad North is 6 km (4 mi) from Thiruvalla.

== Constituent villages ==
- Muthavazhy
- Vanmazhy
- Keezhvanmazhy
- Pandanad West
- Pandanad North
- Prayar
- Premattakara

== Flora ==
Sugarcane is cultivated in most of the area. However, there are many farms that cultivate pepper, banana, tapioca, and coconut palm. Much of the land is rural and has a rich undergrowth. The more common trees are coconut palms, mahogany, and teak.

== Boat racing ==
Pandanadu has 5 Palliyodams (snake boats) owned by different "Karas" (localities), viz., Pandanad, Keezhvanmazhy, Vanmazhy, Muthavazhy, and Prayar. Among which Keezhvanmazhy has the biggest one. Keezhvanmazhy Palliyodam was awarded the Mannam Trophy in 1996 and 2015 and second prize in the 2008 Aranmula Utharattati Boat Race.

== Schools ==
A number of schools are located at both parts of the Pandanad Panchayat. They are Swami Vivekanda Higher Secondary School, R.K.V. L.P. School, M.A.M. School, and Govt. JBS Pandanad, Keezhvanmazhy.

== Demographics ==
In 2001, the Pandanad Panchayat had a total population of 12,466, of which males constituted 47.03% of the population and females 52.97%. Pandanad has an average literacy rate of 85.27%, which is higher than the national average of 74.02%, with a male literacy rate of 85% and female literacy of 77%. There are no scheduled tribes in the Pandanad Village, but there are 1921 people belonging to scheduled castes in the village. Pandanad's two most common religions are Hinduism and Christianity. Pandanad, being a part of Middle Travancore, has been influenced by the Travancore family and the Pandalam royal family, which led to the development of a number of temples in the area, which attracts many devotees from within and outside the state.

== Temples ==
Legends tell of how Pandanad was formed by the Pandavas, hence the name Pandava Nadu. Pandanad had many temples that claim origins from the Pandava. Many of these temples attract residents from surrounding states and are believed to be powerful temples.

=== List of Temples in and around Pandanad ===
| Deity | Name of the Temple | Location |
|---|---|---|
| Durga | Adichikkavu Sree Durga Devi Kshetram | Pandanad West |
| Durga | Karingattukavu Devi Temple | Prayar, Pandanad North |
| Durga | Kodungallur Bhagavathy Temple | Padanad |
| Durga | Cheruvally Bhagavathy Temple; Muthavazhy (pulipra) | Pandanad East |
| Durga | Alummoottil Nada Devi Temple | Keezhvanmazhy, Pandanad |
| Durga | Sree Kartyayni Temple | Keezhvanmazhy, Pandanad |
| Shiva | Anandeshwaram Mahadeva Temple | Pandanad West |
| Vishnu | Trikkanvapuram Maha Vishnu Temple | Keezhvanmazhy, Pandanad |
| Vishnu | SreeKrishna Swami Temple | Keezhvanmazhy, Pandanad |
| Vishnu | Sreemankulangara Temple | Vanmazhy, Pandanad East |
| Vishnu | Pancha Pandava Temple | |
| Vishnu | Trichittattu (Believed to be Erected by Yudhishthira) | |
| Vishnu | Tripuliyoor (Believed to be Erected by Bhima) | |
| Vishnu | Tiruaranmula (Believed to be Erected by Arjuna) | |
| Vishnu | Thrikkaippurathu Mahavishnu Temple | Prayar, Pandanad North |
| Krishna | Sree Gosalakrishna Temple(Believed to be Erected by Nakula) | Thiruvanvandoor (adjoining village) |
| Murugan | Kumaramanglam Subramanyaswami Temple | Muthavazhy, East of Pandanad |

=== Kumaramanglam Subramanyaswami Temple ===
Kumaramanglam Subramanyaswami Temple in Muthavazhy, Pandanad, Kerala, India, is dedicated to Murugan and has great historic and architectural importance. The temple dome is believed to be over 2000 years old and is made from iridium. This temple had been added to the list of protected memorials in India. This temple also claims an ancient snake boat that could hold over 80 people. Cheruvally Cheruvally Bhgavathy Temple, also called Pulipra Temple, is located at the easternmost part of Pandanad in Muthavazhy.

== Churches ==
The churches in the region hold parentage in the arrival of St.Thomas the Apostle in AD 52. There are various Christian denominations in the area that maintain more than one church in the region. Maramon Convention (a Christian Convention) was started in Kallissery, a town near the Kadavil Malika. With the rise of the Pentecostal Movement in India, many Marthoma, Orthodox, and Pentecostal denominations and churches were also started in the region.

| Denomination | Name of the Church | Location |
|---|---|---|
| Malankara Mar Thoma Syrian Church | First church in this area is Pandanad Marthoma Valiya Palli - Estd 1900./ Pandanad St. Thomas Mar Thoma Church; Immanuel Marthoma Church; Jerusalem Marthoma Church Prayar; St. Thomas Mar Thoma Church Nakkada; Sehion Marthoma Church Prayar; Umayattukara Mar Thoma Church | Pandanad, Pandanad West; Pandanad North; Prayar, Pandanad North; Pandanad, Pandanad West; Kallissery, Pandanad North |
| Malankara Orthodox Syrian Church | Yordhanpuram St. Gregorious Orthodox Church(Kalikunnu Palli); St. Mary's Orthodox Church; Umayattukara St Thomas orthodox Valiyapally | Vanmazhy; Pandanad West; Kallissery |
| Knanaya-Syrian Orthodox church | Kallissery Knanaya Valiyapally | Kallissery |
| Syro-Malabar Catholic Church | St. Theresas Catholic Church | Pandanad West |
| Syro-Malankara Catholic Church | St. Thomas Church | Prayar, Pandanad North |
| Pentecost Church | The Pentecost Mission (TPM) Assemblies of God Church of God Brothern Church IPC Church | Pandanad Parampathur Padi Pandanad Palli Padi Pandanad Mithramadam Junction Pandanad Parampathur Padi Illimala Palam |
