= Leo Frade =

Cuban bishop

The Right Reverend Leopold Frade
- Bishop of Southeast Florida
- Church: Episcopal Church
- Diocese: Southeast Florida
- Elected: May 6, 2000
- In office: 2000–2016
- Predecessor: Calvin O. Schofield, Jr.
- Successor: Peter Eaton
- Previous post: Bishop of Honduras (1984-2000)

Orders
- Ordination: October 17, 1977 by James Duncan
- Consecration: January 25, 1984 by John Allin

Personal details
- Born: 10 October 1943 (age 82) Havana, Cuba
- Denomination: Anglican (prev. Methodist)
- Parents: Leopoldo & Angela Frade
- Spouse: Diana Dillenberger
- Children: 4

Leopold "Leo" Frade (born October 10, 1943) is the third Bishop of the Episcopal Diocese of Southeast Florida and former Bishop of Honduras.

== Education ==
Frade was born in Havana, Cuba, on 10 October 1943 to devout Methodists Leopoldo and Angela Frade.

Frade attended Candler College (now Amistad Cubano-Sovietica Technical School), then a Methodist school in Cuba, and received a B.L. in 1960. He continued his college education in the United States at Asbury College, but left at the end of his junior year to join his family in New York and to go to work.

While in New York, Leo Frade decided to join the Episcopal Church. After moving to Miami in 1969, he was confirmed and started to prepare for seminary. He studied theology at the University of the South and received an M.Div. in 1977. He also received a B.A. from Biscayne College (now St. Thomas University), in 1978.

== Honorary degrees ==
Frade has received the following honorary degrees:

- 1982, D.D., General Theological Seminary;
- 1989, D.D., University of the South;
- 2001, D.D., Episcopal Theological Seminary of the Southwest; and
- 2006, S.T.D., Florida Center for Theological Studies

== Ministry ==
Frade was ordained to the diaconate April 17, 1977, and to the priesthood October 17, 1977. On January 25, 1984, he was consecrated bishop of the Episcopal Diocese of Honduras.

He served as curate of Holy Cross Episcopal Church, Miami, Florida, from 1977–1978, and priest in charge of Hispanic ministries of Grace Episcopal Church, in New Orleans, Louisiana, from 1978–1982. After the Mariel Boatlift, Frade was one of two Episcopal priests to be convicted for "trading with the enemy" for their part in bringing 402 refugees from Mariel on a converted minesweeper, the God's Mercy. The conviction was later overturned.

He served as Bishop of The Episcopal Diocese of Honduras from 1984–2000, when he was elected the third Bishop of Southeast Florida on May 6, 2000. He was enthroned on September 16, 2000.

In his ecclesial ministry, he welcomed Father Alberto Cutié into the Episcopal Church, something which provoked a negative reaction from local Catholic leaders, who said it could harm relations between the two congregations.

According to the decision of the 2009 General Convention of the Episcopal Church allowing bishops to authorize same sex unions, Bishop Frade approved a petition by All Saints Episcopal Church rector, Father Sherod Mallow to perform a special blessing ceremony of same-gendered couples. The special ceremony was held in April, 2012.

== Family ==
Leo married Carmen Frade and had two children. Leo married Diana Dillenberger on December 22, 1987.

Episcopal Church (USA) titles
Preceded by Calvin O. Schofield, Jr.	3rd Bishop of Southeast Florida; 2000 – present	Succeeded by incumbent
