= All Saints Episcopal Church (Fort Lauderdale, Florida) =

Church in Fort Lauderdale, Florida

Coordinates: 26.1187°N 80.1298°W

All Saints Episcopal Church Fort Lauderdale
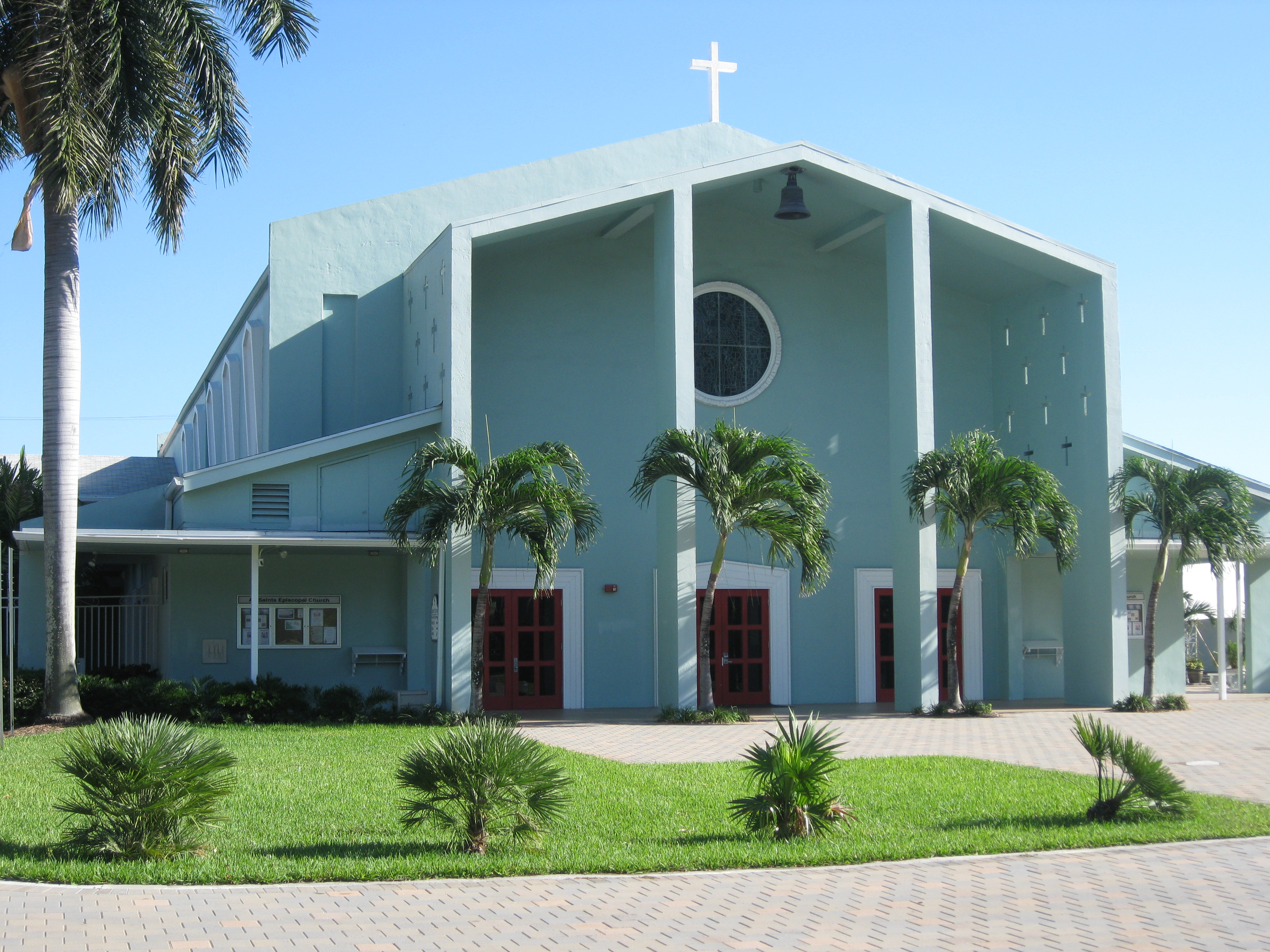
- All Saints Episcopal Church; Fort Lauderdale
- Denomination: Episcopal
- Churchmanship: High church Evangelical
- Website: / allsaintsfl.com

History
- Dedication: All Saints

Administration
- Province: IV
- Diocese: Southeast Florida The Right Reverend Peter Eaton, Bishop The Right Reverend Gregory Rickel, Assisting Bishop
- Deanery: Broward Deanery
- Parish: All Saints

Clergy
- Rector: The Reverend Currently Vacant The Rev'd. Carl Beasley, Priest Associate The Rev'd. Clark Powers, Priest Associate The Rev’d Dr. Joseph Krasinski Tony Catka, Junior Warden

All Saints Episcopal Church is a parish of the Episcopal Diocese of Southeast Florida founded in the year 1912. and located in downtown Fort Lauderdale, Florida

== Church History ==
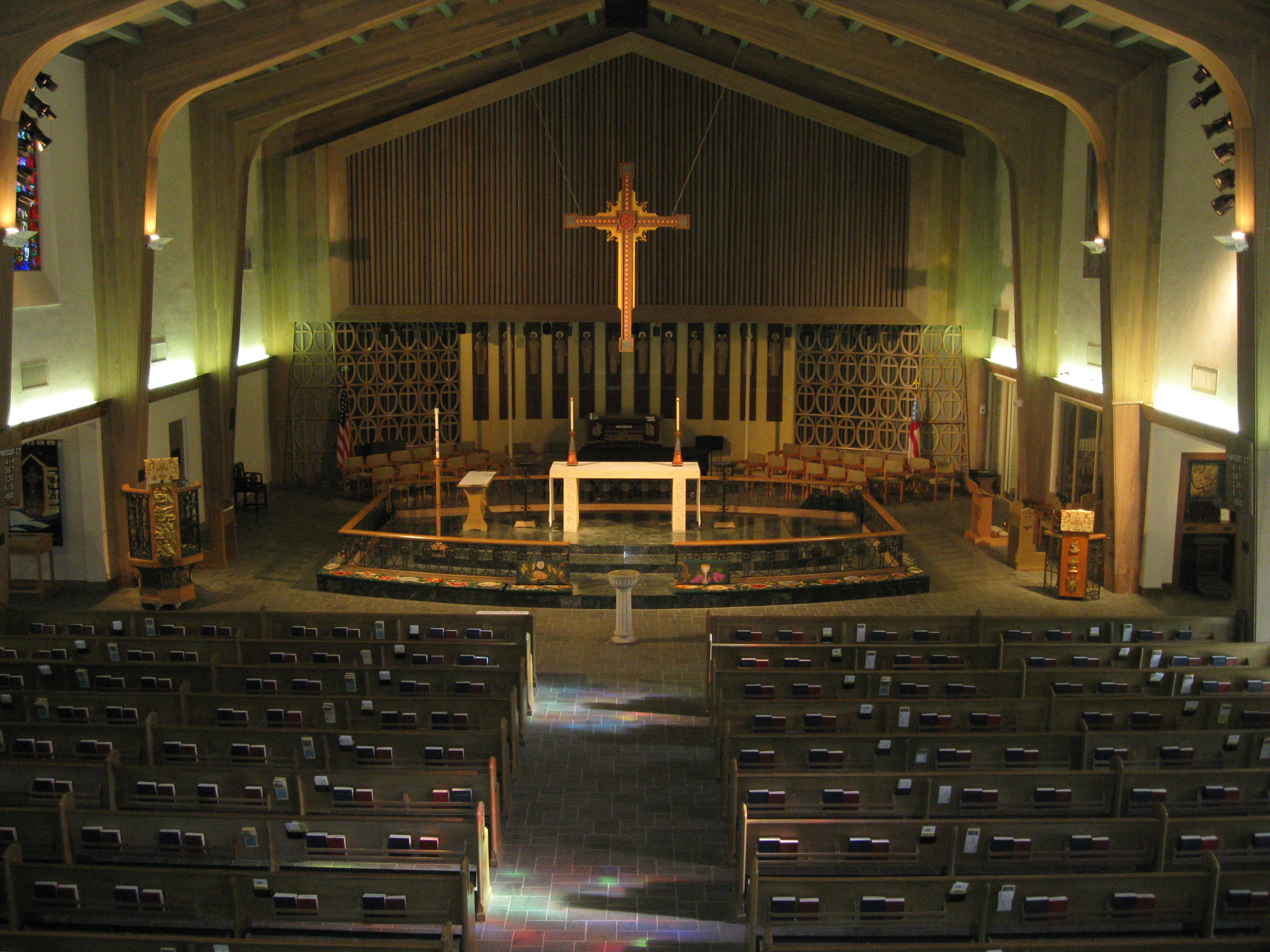
The sanctuary interior of All Saints, in October 2012.

The original All Saints congregation was founded by eight women of Fort Lauderdale in 1912 and met in various temporary locations for several years until a permanent location could be procured. In 1921 the congregation, which was designated by the Episcopal church as a “mission” dependent on the diocese, purchased a vacant church building previously used by St. Martin’s-on-the-Green in Jupiter, Florida and transported it to a location near Stranahan Park in Downtown Fort Lauderdale. In 1938 the All Saints congregation was determined to be financially self-sufficient and was redefined from “mission” to “parish, .” The Reverend Harold Franklin Bache was named the parish's first official rector. By 1943 the congregation had 305 communicants and had become too large for the former St. Martin’s church building.

A ten-year effort to establish the parish in a newly constructed church building was initiated by Rev. Mark Carpenter in 1948. The new church building at the parish's present location was designed by the architect Clinton B. Gamble, an All Saints member. The parish donated its former church building to St. Christopher’s Parish, another local Episcopal congregation. The new church building was consecrated on November 6, 1958, and the parish continued to add classrooms, a music room, and a kitchen to the church facilities over the years.

== Church Architecture and Property ==
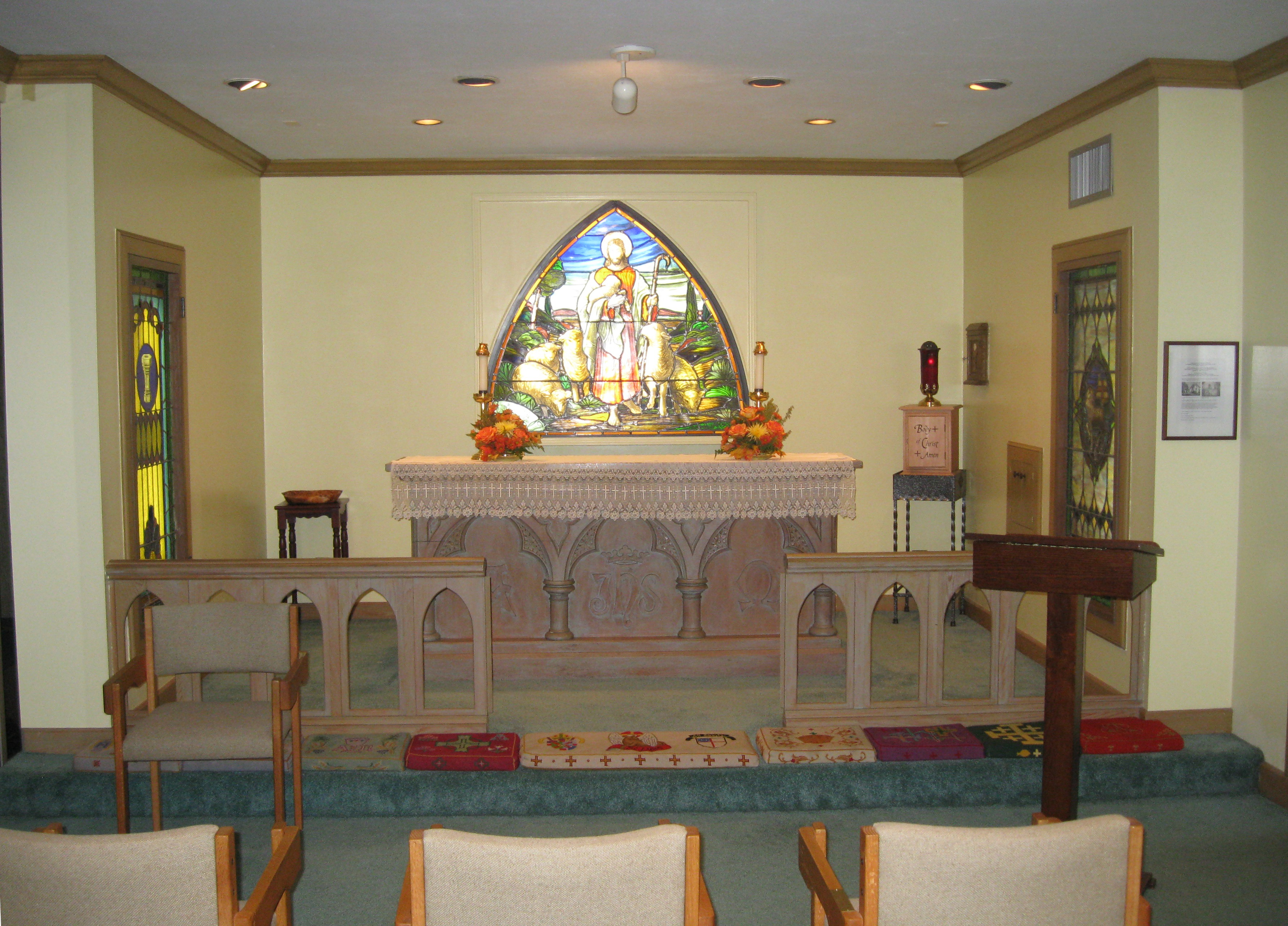
Luke the Evangelist

On the north wall of the sanctuary, above the narthex is a Rose Window. On the west wall are five stained glass windows depicting St. Mary, St. Andrew, St. Alban, St. Athanasius, and St. Francis. On the east wall are four stained glass windows depicting St. Joan of Arc, William Tyndale, Samuel Seabury, and John Coleridge Patteson.

Four additional stained glass windows depicting the life of Christ were originally hung on the west wall of the sanctuary, but were removed and rehung on the west wall of Neaverson Chapel when it was added onto the church. They have been positioned in the shape of a cross with a clear pane of glass in the middle.

Several valued items were preserved from the original All Saints church at Stranahan Park, and were made a part of the new church building. In the sanctuary is the Lord’s Prayer, carved in large gothic-inspired font on wooden beams. In St. Luke’s Chapel are the original altar rail, altar and lace covering, Good Shepherd stained glass window, and two small rectangular stained glass windows.

== Controversies ==
=== Formal Charges Within Episcopal Church Against Rector For Sex Scandal and Financial Misconduct ===
In July, 1998 the Episcopal Diocese of Southeast Florida issued a formal ecclesiastical presentment, which is a church document similar to an indictment, charging Rev. John Brackett with improper relationships with five women parishioners and financial misconduct during his nine years as rector of the parish. Brackett had previously been relieved of his pastoral duties in April, 1998 and placed on paid leave, while the present rector Father Sherod Mallow, who was associate rector at that time, took over the responsibilities of running the parish during the investigation by church authorities. In December, 1998, the parish announced that its Vestry had made a final, formal decision to terminate Brackett permanently "over his 'leadership style' and the apparent misuse of charity funds."

=== Jailing of homeless man ===
In January, 2006 homeless man Orienthal Bowens from Georgia was found guilty of criminal charges after the parish had him arrested for sleeping in the church and eating canned goods from the donation baskets. According to parishioners he also harassed them and built a fire in a church balcony. He was sentenced to time served after being held in a Pompano Beach, Florida lockup for sixteen months. On the weekend following the homeless man's final court appearance All Saints parish members commented to newspaper reporters that they supported the conviction after hearing Sunday sermon about respecting the dignity of all people.

== Outreach ==
=== RiverSounds Concert Series ===
RiverSounds started in 2005 with Seraphic Fire, Girl Choir of South Florida, Florida Singing Sons and some concerts by All Saints choir and musicians. These groups, plus the addition of Delray String Quartet, pianists Roger Rundle and Carl Lauderman, and Seraphic Fire, have been the core of the series. Additional musicians are added each year and are evaluated for their audience appeal. Only the best quality musicians are invited to participate in this concert series. Repertoire is primarily classical and/or sacred.

RiverSounds was conceived as outreach to the greater Fort Lauderdale community. All Saints is recognized as one of the best mid-sized acoustical venues in South Florida. The addition of a 9' Petrof Concert Grand piano created additional appeal of this venue to musicians. Marketing, PR and ticket sales are managed by each individual group thus minimizing the management required by All Saints staff. Established ensembles as encouraged to contribute a small stipend to cover expenses incurred for utilities and custodial. All Saints assists by marketing to the parish and by developing the reputation throughout the greater Fort Lauderdale community as an advocate for exceptional music.

=== Hispanic Ministry ===
In 2006, the All Saints congregation started ministering to low-income Latino immigrants in an effort entitled "El Centro Hispano de Todos los Santos" (in English: "The Hispanic Center of All Saints"), led by Rev. Rosa Lindahl. The "El Centro" ministry became large enough to be considered a "parish" and began meeting at St. Ambrose, another local parish church which had a surplus of space and no full-time priest. Rev. Lindahl was later installed as the priest-missioner at St. Ambrose, and established El Centro there permanently. The three parishes (All Saints, El Centro, and St. Ambrose) formed a collective outreach ministry under the name "New River Regional Ministries".

=== Blessing of Same-Sex Couples ===
In April, 2012, All Saints Rector, The Reverend Sherod Mallow officiated a blessing ceremony for nine same-gendered couples who had been previously joined in legally recognized marriage ceremonies in California, Canada, Connecticut, New York and the District of Columbia. Mallow had petitioned the Bishop of Southeast Florida, Leo Frade, for permission to perform the ceremony according to the decision of the 2009 General Convention of the Episcopal Church allowing bishops to authorize same.

=== Other programs ===
All Saints participates in several local outreach programs, such as T.R.U.E., Beds Around the Altar, the Jubilee Center of South Broward, and St. Laurence Chapel Day Center. The All Saints chapter of Episcopal Church Women is active in the local community.

== See also ==
- Episcopal Church (United States)
- Province 4 of the Episcopal Church in the United States of America
- Episcopal Diocese of Florida

== Resources ==
- Helen Von Salzen. Our First Century: A History of All Saints Episcopal Church in Fort Lauderdale, 1912–2006. 2006.
- Church Website
