= All Saints Episcopal Church (Winter Park, Florida) =

Historic church in Florida, United States

- U.S. National Register of Historic Places
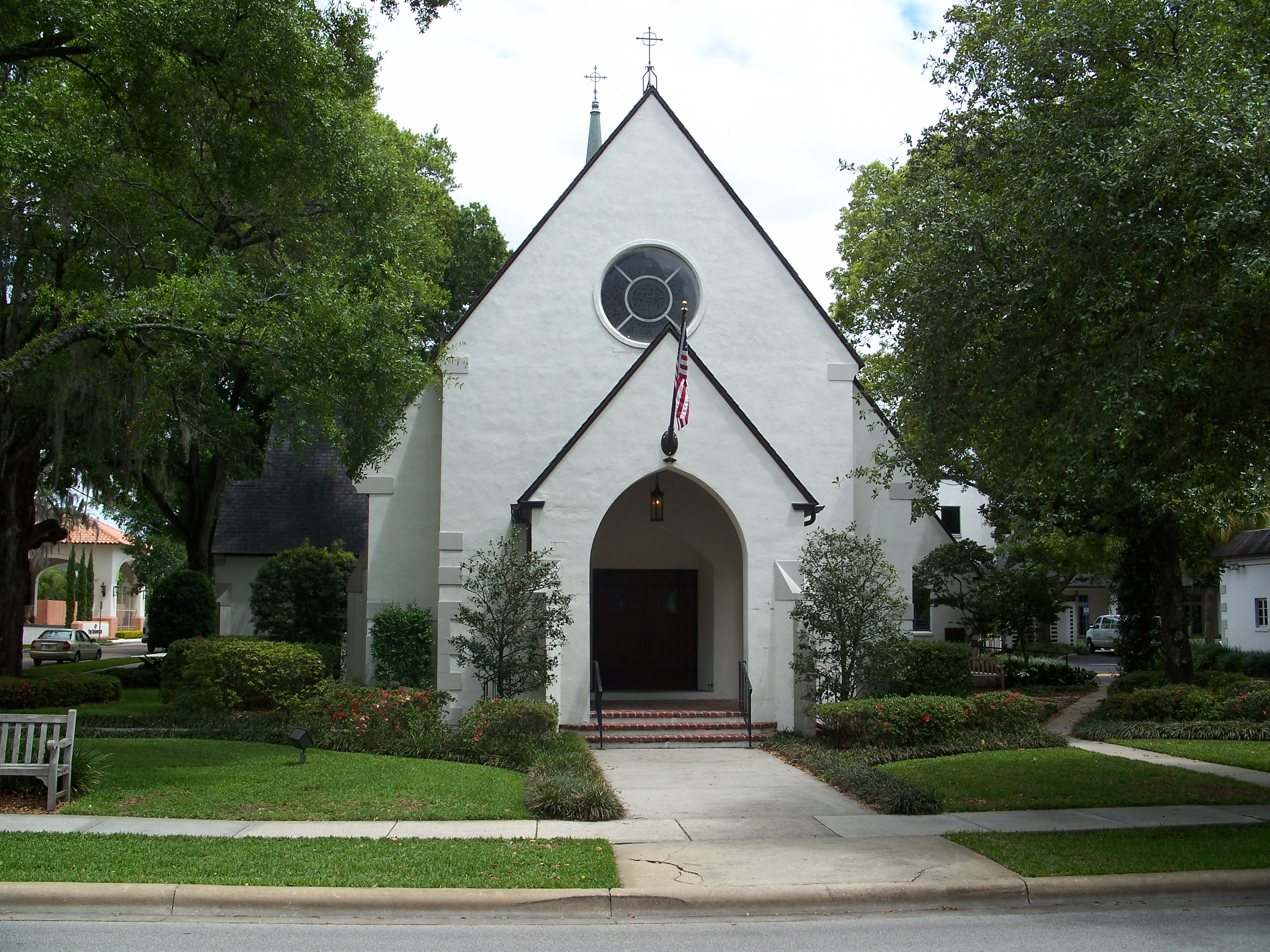

- Location within Florida Location within the United States
- Location: 338 E. Lyman Ave., Winter Park, Florida
- Coordinates: 28°35′40″N 81°20′55″W
- Area: less than one acre
- Built: 1941
- Architect: Ralph Adams Cram; Cone, H.C.
- Architectural style: Late Gothic Revival
- NRHP reference No.: 99001647
- Added to NRHP: January 7, 2000

All Saints Episcopal Church is a historic church in Winter Park, Florida, United States. It is located at 338 E Lyman Avenue. On January 7, 2000, it was added to the U.S. National Register of Historic Places. It includes Late Gothic Revival architecture designed by Ralph Adams Cram and by H.C. Cone.

== History ==
In 1886, an Episcopal church was built on the land. By 1937, instead of renovating the current building, the congregation wanted to construct a new, larger building. The church hired architectural firm Cram and Ferguson to design it. With World War II on the horizon, the church pushed to start the new church's construction in 1941. On March 29, 1942, the first worship service in the new church was held by Reverend Paul Matthews. Stained glass windows were installed in the church between 1946 and 1947 by the Willet Stained Glass Studio. In 2015 the church hired ACi Architects based out of Winter Park, FL to conduct a programming study.

== Rectors ==
- (1945–1950) James L. Duncan, later suffragan bishop of the Episcopal Diocese of South Florida and first bishop of the Episcopal Diocese of Southeast Florida.

The current Rector is the Rev. F. Stuart Shelby.
