= Karingattukavu Devi Temple =

Hindu temple in Alappuzha district, Kerala

- Karingattukavu Devi Temple, Prayar, Pandanad, Alappuzha, Kerala

Religion
- Affiliation: Hinduism
- District: Alappuzha
- Deity: Durga
- Festival: Annual festival in the Malayalam month of Meenam

Location
- Location: Prayar, Pandanad
- State: Kerala
- Country: India
- Interactive map of Karingattukavu Devi Temple
- Coordinates: 9°19′42.0″N 76°34′49.6″E

Architecture
- Type: Architecture of Kerala

Specifications
- Temple: One
- Elevation: 33.07 m (108 ft)

The Karingattukavu Devi Temple is located at Prayar village, Chengannur taluk, Kerala, in India on the bank of the river Pampa. It is a Durga and Bhadrakali temple. An annual festival is held at the temple during the Meena month (March) of the Malayalam Calendar, and the most important day is Karthika.
