= Anandeshwaram Mahadeva Temple =

Shiva temple in Kerala, India

Anandeswaram Sree Mahadeva Kshethram
- Anandeshwaram Sree Mahadeva Temple, Chengannur, Alappuzha, Kerala

Religion
- Affiliation: Hinduism
- District: Alappuzha
- Deity: Shiva
- Festival: Maha Shivaratri

Location
- Location: Chengannur
- State: Kerala
- Country: India
- Interactive map of Anandeswaram Sree Mahadeva Kshethram
- Coordinates: 9°20′05.9″N 76°22′26.1″E

Specifications
- Temple: One
- Elevation: 25.75 m (84 ft)

Anandeswaram Sree Mahadeva Kshethram (Malayalam: ആനന്ദേശ്വര൦ ശ്രീമഹാദേവ ക്ഷേത്ര൦) is one of the oldest temples in Pandanad village. It is located at Pandanad in Chengannur taluk of Alappuzha district in the south Indian state of Kerala. The temple is situated between Chengannur, and Mannar.

Anandeswaram Sree Mahadeva Kshethram is a Hindu temple, dedicated to Shiva. The temple was earlier on the bank of the river Pampa. It was destroyed by the river's changed flow. The deity was moved to a nearby place where it is known as Anandeswaram Mahadeva Kshethram.

== Festivals ==
The major festival is Maha Shivarathri (മഹാ ശിവരാത്രി), which takes place during Kumbham (കു൦ഭ൦).

Sapthaha Yajnam (സപ്താഹ യജ്ഞം) is celebrated for 7 days.

Navaha Yajnam (നവാഹ യജ്ഞം) is celebrated for 9 days.

Parayeduppu (പറയെടുപ്പ്) happens in the festival season, before Maha Shivarathri. Mahadeva visits the homes of the people in Pandanad area.

== Sub-deities ==
Like other Hindu temples, Anandeshwaram Mahadeva also has shrines of other deities. These deities include shrines of Maha Vishnu (മഹാവിഷ്ണു), Parvati (പാർവ്വതി) as Bhuvaneshwary (ഭുവനേശ്വരി), Ganapathy(ഗണപതി), Sasthavu (ശാസ്താവ്), Yakshiamma (യക്ഷിയമ്മ), Nagarajav (നാഗരാജാവ്), Nagayakshi (നാഗയക്ഷി), Brahmarakshas (ബ്രഹ്മരക്ഷസ്).

== See also ==
- Maha Shivaratri
- Pandanad
- Temples of Kerala
- Temple festivals of Kerala
