= Adichikkavu Sree Durga Devi Kshetram =

Hindu temple in Kerala, India

Adichikkavu Devi Kshetram
- Location in Kerala

Religion
- Affiliation: Hinduism
- District: Alappuzha
- Deity: Durga
- Festival: Pathamudayam
- Governing body: Pandanad Karayogam

Location
- Location: Chengannur
- State: Kerala
- Country: India
- Interactive map of Adichikkavu Devi Kshetram
- Coordinates: 9.33246°N 76.563879°E

Architecture
- Type: Traditional Kerala style

Adichikkavu Sree Durga Devi Kshetram, also known as the Adichikavu (Adichicavu) Devi Temple (Malayalam: അടിചിക്കാവ് ശ്രീ ദുര്‍ഗ ദേവി ക്ഷേത്രം) is one of the oldest temple in Pandanad village, Alapuzha. The temple is located at Pandanad in Chengannur taluk of Alappuzha district in the south Indian state of Kerala. The temple is situated about 6 km west of Chengannur, and 4 km east of Mannar.

== About Temple ==
Adichikkavu Sree Durga Devi Kshetram, is a Hindu temple, dedicated to goddess Sree Vana Durga (ശ്രി വന ദുര്‍ഗ).

The major attraction of the temple is its top opened Sreekovil (ശ്രീകോവില്‍), specially made for Vana Durga (വന ദുര്‍ഗ).

The temple complex also includes Anakottil (ആനകൊട്ടില്‍) & Sapthaha Mandapam (സപ്താഹ മണ്ഡപം) which is built on the west-north side of the temple.

== Festivals ==
Pathamudayam (പത്താമുദയം) - The major festival is Pathamudayam which takes place in the temple during the month of Medam (April). The ten-day celebrations starts on Vishu (വിഷു), and ends on 23 April with night long celebrations.

Sapthaha Yajnam (സപ്താഹ യജ്ഞം) - Each year Sapthaham celebrates for 7 days with worships and food for devotees.

Pongala (പൊങ്കാല) - Women gather every year in this temple and prepare Pongala (rice cooked with jaggery, ghee, coconut as well as other ingredients) in small pots to please the Goddess Durga.

Parayeduppu (പറയെടുപ്പ്) -

The Parayeduppu is happening in the festival season, before to the Pathamudayam. Devi is visiting to the homes of the people in Pandanad area.

Navaha Yajnam (നവാഹ യജ്ഞം) - Each year 'Navaha Yajnam' celebrates for 9 days with worships and food for devotees.

== Sub-Deities ==
Like other Hindu temples, temple also has shrines of other deities. These deities include shrines of Yakshiamma (യക്ഷിയമ്മ), Nagarajav (നാഗരാജാവ്), Nagayakshi (നാഗയക്ഷി), Brahmarakshas (ബ്രഹ്മരക്ഷസ്).

== See also ==
- List of Hindu temples in India
- Pandanad
- Temples of Kerala
- Temple festivals of Kerala
