= Trinity Episcopal Cathedral (Miami) =

Historic church in Florida, United States

- U.S. National Register of Historic Places
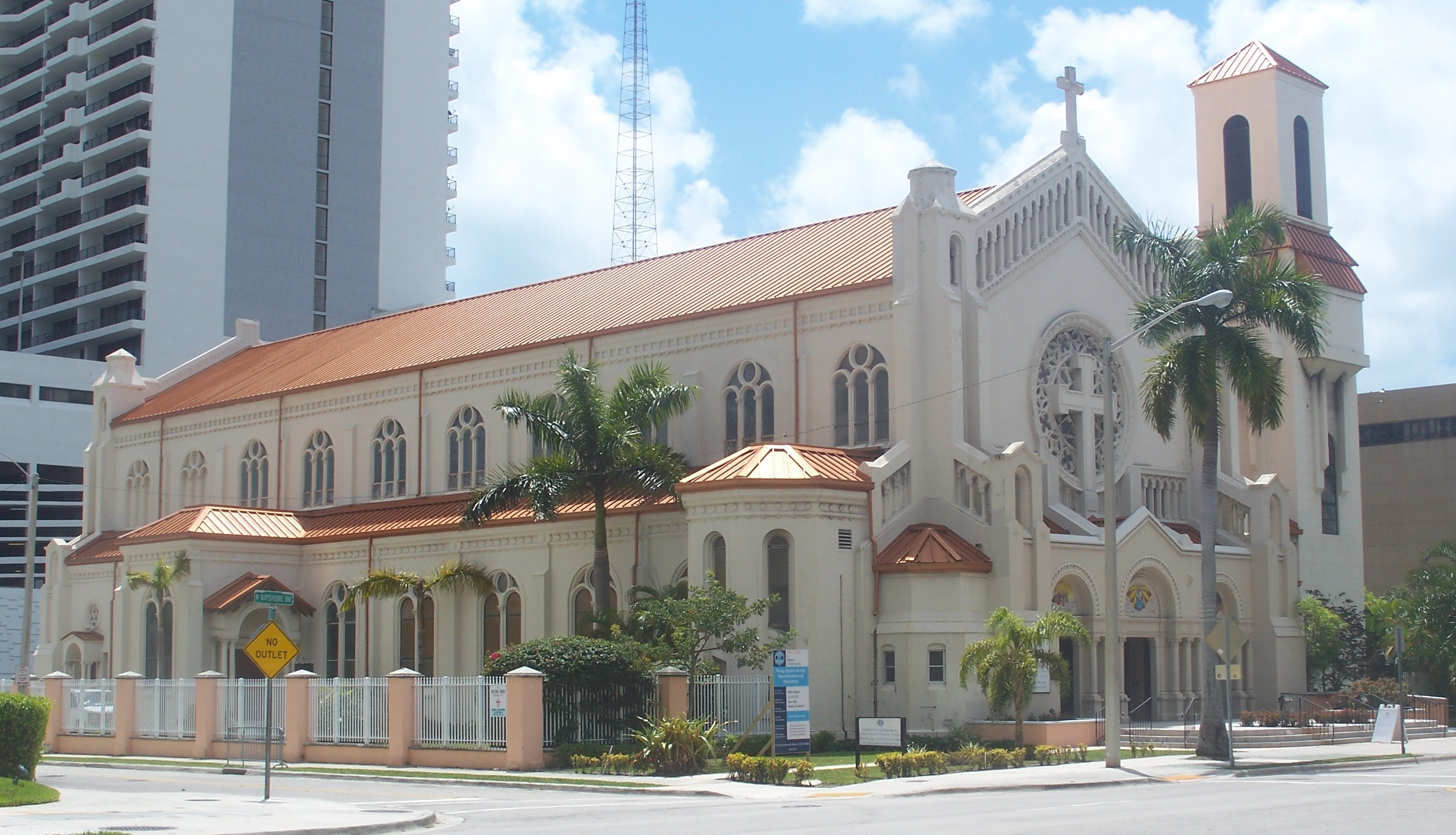
- Trinity Episcopal Cathedral

- Location within Miami Location within Florida Location within the United States
- Location: Miami, Florida
- Coordinates: 25°47′24″N 80°11′12″W
- Built: 1925
- NRHP reference No.: 80000945
- Added to NRHP: October 10, 1980

Trinity Episcopal Cathedral in Miami, Florida is the cathedral church of the Episcopal Diocese of Southeast Florida. It is located at North Bayshore Drive a short distance north of the Venetian Causeway, near the Carnival Center in Miami (464 NE 16th Street, 33132). On October 10, 1980, it was added to the U.S. National Register of Historic Places.

In 2015, the church reported 1,054 members; in 2023, it reported 1,133 members. No membership statistics were reported in 2024 national parochial reports. Plate and pledge financial support reported by the church in 2024 was $643,598. Average Sunday Attendance (ASA) reported in 2024 was 198 persons. This was a relative decrease from ASA of 267 persons reported in 2016.

== National Register listing ==
- Trinity Episcopal Cathedral
- (added 1980 - Building - #80000945)
- 464 NE 16th St., Miami
- Historic Significance: Architecture/Engineering
- Architect, builder, or engineer: Mundy, Harold Hastings
- Architectural Style: Romanesque
- Area of Significance: Architecture
- Period of Significance: 1900–1924
- Owner: Private
- Historic Function: Religion
- Historic Sub-function: Religious Structure
- Current Function: Religion
- Current Sub-function: Religious Structure

== History ==
Trinity Cathedral is the oldest church in the original city limits of Miami, having been organized by the Rt. Rev. William Crane Gray on June 12, 1896, more than a month before the city was incorporated. In 1904, the Trinity Mission became self-supporting and thus achieved parish status. The wooden church building was replaced in 1912 by an imposing, two-story stone church, similar in design to St. Paul's Episcopal Church in Key West.

In 1923, as the great Miami and Florida real estate boom of the roaring twenties neared its peak, the congregation bought land at the corner of NE Bayshore Drive and 15th Street for the site of a church large enough to seat eleven hundred worshipers. Miami architect Harold Hastings Mundy designed the new church, whose construction was finished in July, 1925. The proportions of the building and its general idea were inspired by the Roman Catholic Church of St. Giles, near Nîmes in southern France. Muncy combined Romanesque, Byzantine, and Italianate elements of architecture to give the building a distinctive Mediterranean appearance. When the boom collapsed in 1927, Trinity Church was saddled with a large mortgage debt, which was not paid until 1946, after almost twenty years of sacrifice and struggle.

The interior of the Cathedral contains a profusion of finely wrought mosaics which depict the six days of creation, the hosts of heaven, and the Stations of the Cross. In addition, stained glass windows illustrate events in the life of Jesus with corresponding scenes from the Old Testament, the miracles of Jesus, the Song of the Three Young Men (the Benedictus es), the seven sacraments of the church, and many of the saints and scholars of the British Isles before the Protestant Reformation. The Cathedral interior has a sound reverberation of more than four seconds, a feature which greatly enhances the musical effectiveness of the cathedral's E. M. Skinner/Æolian Skinner pipe organ of fifty-six ranks. and makes it one of the "warmest" rooms for music.

In 1970, the delegates to the first convention of the new Episcopal Diocese of Southeast Florida voted to make Trinity Church the cathedral for the diocese, the location of the bishop's throne, the cathedra. In 1980, the cathedral was judged to be of such architectural and historical significance that it was placed on the U. S. Department of the Interior's Register of National Historic Places.

== See also ==
- List of the Episcopal cathedrals of the United States
- List of cathedrals in Florida
