= Maramon Convention =

Annual religious meeting in Kerala, India

Coordinates: 9°20′02″N 76°42′04″E

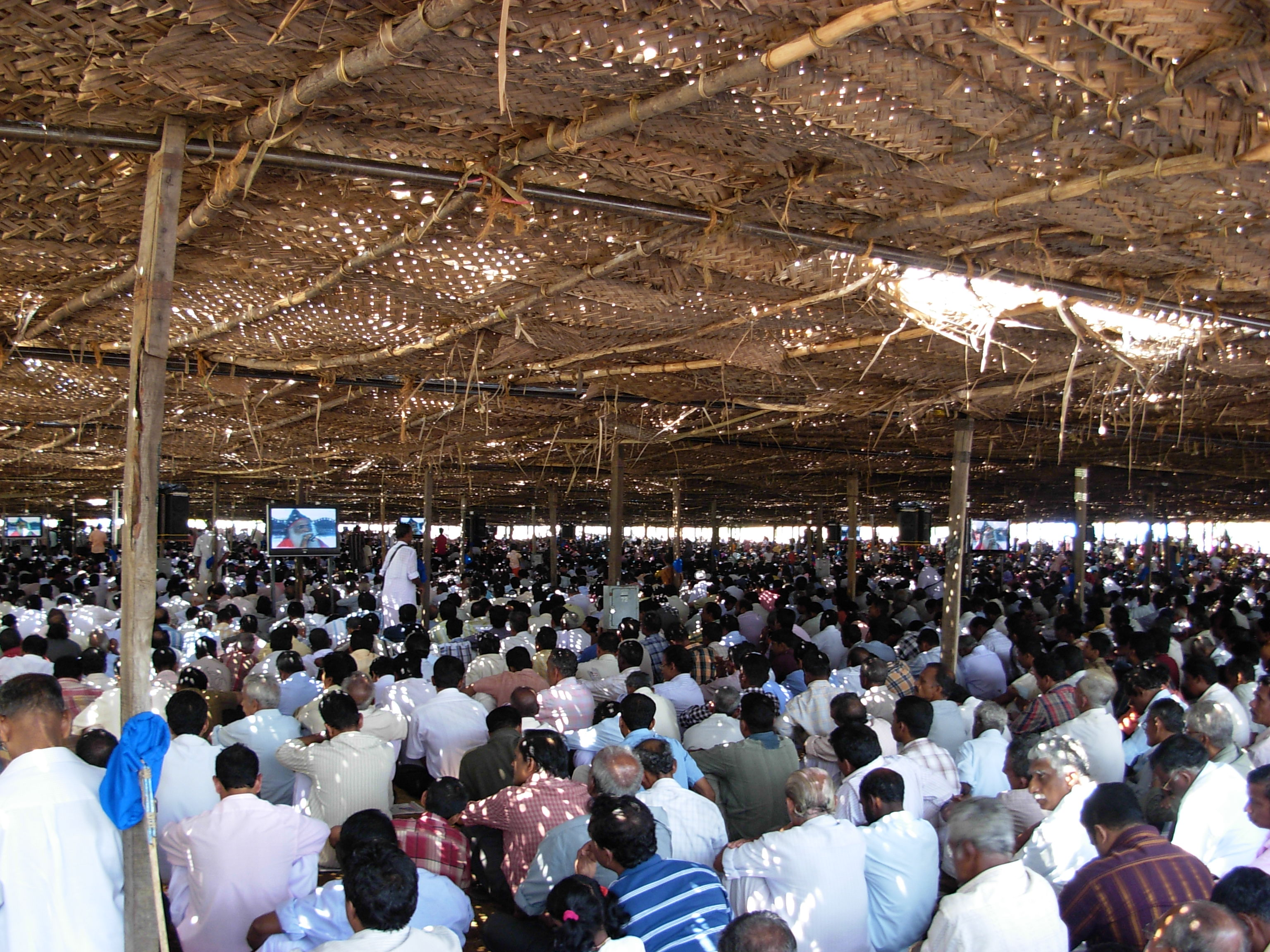
- Genre: Christian conferences
- Dates: Second week of February
- Frequency: Annually
- Locations: Maramon, Kozhencherry, Pathanamthitta, Kerala, India
- Founded: 1895
- Organiser: Malankara Mar Thoma Syrian Church - through Mar Thoma Evangelistic Association (MTEA)
- Website: https://mtconvention.com/

The Maramon Convention, is the largest Christian convention in Asia, held at Maramon, Kozhencherry, Pathanamthitta, Kerala, India annually in February on the vast sand-bed of the Pampa River next to the Kozhencherry Bridge. It is organised by Mar Thoma Evangelistic Association, the missionary wing of the Malankara Mar Thoma Syrian Church.

The origin and growth of this annual get-together for one week at a stretch can be traced to the great revival movement which gathered momentum during the reformation period in the Syrian Churches of Kerala under the pioneering leadership of Abraham Malpan in the latter part of the 19th century. This brought about the transformation in resurgence of the ancient apostolic Churches in Kerala founded by St. Thomas the Apostle approximately in AD 52.

== Cultural identity of Saint Thomas Christians ==
Saint Thomas in the Syriac-speaking culture of upper Mesopotamia and Syria the apostle was called Judas Thomas. Thomas (Tau'ma) means twin in Syriac.

Jawaharlal Nehru in his Glimpses of World History, 1934 wrote about Christianity in India:

"You may be surprised to learn that Christianity came to India long before it went to England or Western Europe, and when even in Rome it was a despised and proscribed sect. Within 100 years or so of the death of Jesus, Christian Missionaries came to South India by sea. They were received courteously and permitted to preach their new faith. They converted a large number of people, and their descendants have lived there, with varying fortune, to this day. Most of them belong to old Christian sects which have ceased to exist in Europe".

St. Ephraem, a Christian deacon and scholar, in AD 363 composed a poem that honors St. Thomas in that era's understanding:

"Blessed art thou, like a solar ray, India’s darkness doth dispel. Thou the great lamp, one among the Twelve, with oil from the cross replenished India’s night flooded with light. Oh Blessed Apostle, valiant Mar Thoma whom violent threats did not affright, Blessed apostle be thou praised, whom the Great King has sent that India to his one begotten thou shouldest espouse."

An ancient Indian non-Christian work Nagargarandhavaryola mentions St. Thomas:

In AD 52 "the foreigner Thomas Sanyasi came to our village, preached there causing pollution. We therefore came away from that village."

== Mar Thoma Evangelistic Association ==
By 1877, there were two factions in the Malankara church, known as Bishop faction (Methran Kakshi) and Patriarch faction (Bava Kakshi). By a court verdict on 12 July 1889, Bishop faction lost all the properties. In this turbulent period, on 5 September 1888, 12 members of the Bishop faction formed a missionary group called "Mar Thoma Evangelistic Association". These 12 members are considered the founding fathers of the Maramon convention. The names of these 12 members are:-

Kadavil Malika

1. Kottarathil Thomas Kasseessa, Chengannur
2. Edavamvelil Mathai, Eraviperoor.
3. Kottooreth Yohannan, Chengannur
4. Chempakasseril Kadavil Abraham, Kallissery
5. Chakkalayil Cherian Upadesi, Puthencavu
6. Chempakasseril Kadavil Mathuchen, Kallissery
7. Azhakinal Thommi, Kallooppara
8. Nathaniel Upadesi, Chengannur
9. Kurichiath (Vattadiyil) Ittiyavara, Niranam
10. Arangat Philipose, Maramon
11. Ottaplammoottil Kunju Mathew, Kallissery
12. Kochumannil Skariah, Edayaranmula

They met at the Kadavil Malika belonging to Chempakasseril Kadavil Abraham and Chempakasseril Kadavil Mathuchen (1860 - 1897). This house at Kallissery near Chengannur was built by their grandfather Unnittan Kathanar (1767 - 1852) and his son Abraham Kathanar (1822 - 1884) also known as Kadavil Achen, in the early 19th century. (The Kadavil Malika was reclaimed by the Malankara Marthoma Syrian Church church and renovated on 10 September 2005.)

== Beginning ==
By 1894, a number of small supportive prayer group communions emerged and this paved a way for revival. They had regular meetings in various parishes. Because the number of people attending these meetings was growing; the need was addressed by deciding to have a meeting of these groups in a wider level at a central accessible place. This was a venue for dimensional spiritual edification that is applicable, biblically sound, ideal and value based for striving with the realities of the world and never a place for signs, wonders and miracles. During the 19th century, people began to occupy hilly places which resulted in felling of forests in and around the catchment area of Pampa river and started intensive cultivation of annual crops like tapioca, yams ... etc. This unplanned encroachment resulted in large scale soil erosion. Deep river with mud was filled with white sand, which turned to be congenial place to assemble for a gathering of masses. No need for any seating arrangement as people can sit on the neat white sand bed under roofs made by knitted coconut leaves. The duty of organising this meeting was given to the Mar Thoma Evangelistic Association and the first convention was held in 1895 at Maramon. Today the changing habitat and lesser focus on agriculture with rise of rubber plantation, the surfaced roads minimised soil erosion and a large scale sand mining for construction activities decreased the size of the sand bed to a great extent.

By 1900 reformers adopted the name Malankara Marthoma Suriyani Sabha also known as the Malankara Mar Thoma Syrian Church to encase its ancient lineage.

== Pictures ==
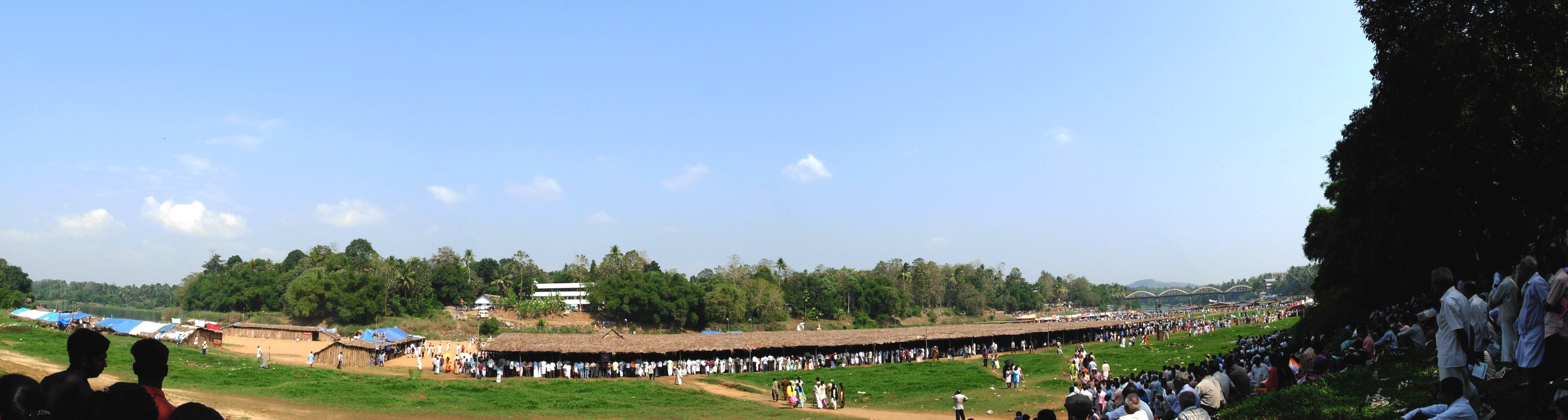
Maramon Convention – 2008

This view of the 2008 convention is from Kozhencherry side. The Kozhencherry bridge is on the right. There are usually no empty spaces inside the Panthal (tent) so people stand outside and group around the shade to listen to the songs and messages.

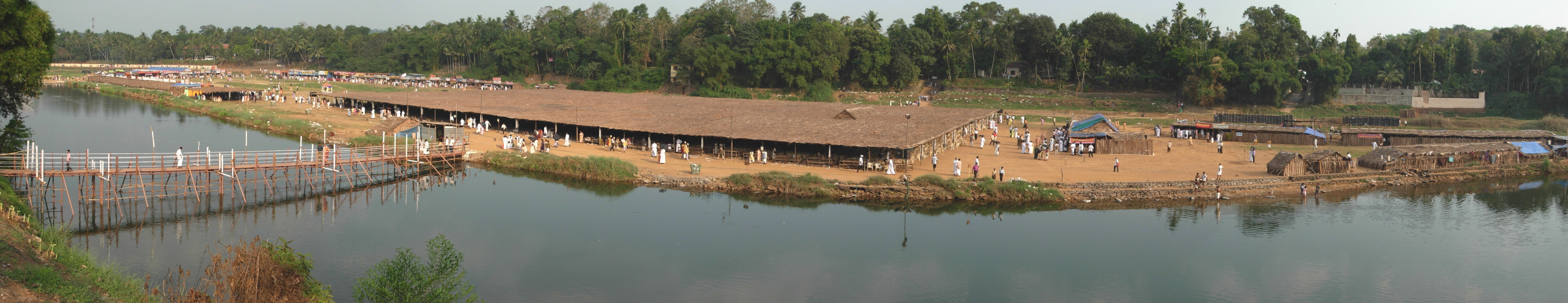
Maramon Convention – 2009

This view of the 2009 convention is from Maramon side. The Kozhencherry bridge is on the left.

== The first convention ==
The first convention was held for 10 days from 8 to 17 March 1895. The venue was the vast sand-bed of the Pampa River next to the Maramon church. The parishes in and around Maramon – Kozhencherry helped in making a very large panthal (tent) to accommodate about 10,000 people. The main speakers were David and Wordsworth. On an average 10,000 to 15,000 people attended these meetings. On the last day almost 25,000 attended. There were no proper roads during those days. So nearby houses accommodated the people from far away places. Some of them came in boats and used them as their shelter.

== The convention at present ==
Maramon Convention is held for eight days during the first week of the Great Lent that usually falls in February. The tent has a seating capacity in excess of 160,000 people. They are seated on the dry sand bed. Old and weak are given sponsored-paid chairs to sit on. There is also a smaller tent erected next to the larger one for people with infants and with children below 5. All around the temporary tent there are prayer and rest sheds and other tents for various purposes related to the Church. Stalls for the sale of religious literature and other items, church mission advertisement and funding offices and restaurants are allowed to operate in the vicinity of the tent under the control of the Church authorities.

== Programme ==
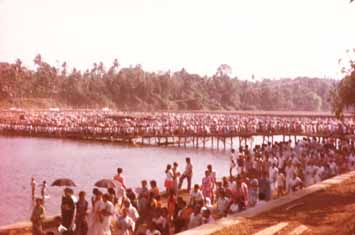
A view of the Convention Nagar, people returning after a session in 1994.

The Maramon Convention is pre-eminently an assembly of Christians who once a year come here for listening to the Word of God as read and expounded by Christian leaders from all over India as well as abroad. Introduction and promotion of Church activities and Preaching occupy the major part of the convention programme. In the morning there will be separate Bible study classes for Men, women, youth and children conducted by specially invited leaders. The mornings and afternoons are public meetings and in the evening, meetings are for men only. Four of the afternoon public meetings are for 'Facing the challenges of Social evils as Christians'. The choir leads the singing and the introduction of voguish songs and the whole gathering joins in singing. A hymn book with 101 hymns including 16 new ones are printed every year for the convention use. Everyday half an hour is spent for intercessory prayer. Also there are family gatherings, youth meetings and special gatherings after the afternoon session.

== Leaders ==
In addition to the Metropolitan and Episcopas of the church, distinguished world-renowned speakers addressed this convention. The Revd Thomas Walker, England (1900–1912), Sadhu Sunder Singh, Punjab (1918), Dr. G. Sherwood Eddy (1919), Dr. E. Stanley Jones, USA (1920–1968), Dr. Toyohiko Kagawa, Japan (1938), John R. Mott, Nobel Peace Prize winner (1946) and President of World Alliance of YMCAs, Dr. Bob Pierce, founder and president of World Vision (1964 & 66), Astronaut Colonel James Irwin, who spent a few hours on the moon (1985), Dr. John Haggai, founder president of Haggai Institute (1973), Bishop Donald Jacobs, Mennonite church (1974), the Most Revd Dr. Robert Runcie, Archbishop of Canterbury (1986), the Most Revd Dr. George Carey, Archbishop of Canterbury (1995), Mrs. Ann Lotts

( D/o Late Billy Graham), Rev. Dr. Theodore Williams, Dr. Samuel Kobia, WCC General Secretary (2007), Dr. Paul S. Rees (Ministry statesman), Revd Dr. A. B. Masilamani, Rev. Dr. Samuel Kamaleson (Veterinarian & Evangelist), and a host of others. Rev. Prof. Valson Thampu (author, preacher, and educationist)

== History ==
=== 2023 ===
The head of the Malankara Mar Thoma Syrian Church, The Most Rev Dr Theodosius Mar Thomas Metropolitan spoke against the government for their handling of the cost-of-living crisis and failure to look after the citizens of Kerala.

=== 2022 ===
The Kerala government allowed up to 1500 adults to attend the convention, if they could show a negative test for Covid 19. The convention ran from 13–20 February.

=== 2021 ===
Kerala High Court ordered that the convention could go ahead on 14–21 February, but that Covid 19 protocol should be strictly followed; numbers were limited to 100 persons for indoor venues, and 200 persons for outdoor venues.

=== 2020 ===
The convention took a stance against the Citizenship (Amendment) Act (CAA) and the National Population Register; this was due to a belief that such laws would lead to religious and caste divide.

=== 2019 ===
From 2019 onward, women were allowed to attend the evening events. In the same year, the evening conventions were to be moved from Pampa river sand bed to the Mar Thoma Church Kozhenchery.

=== 2018 ===
The 123rd Maramon Convention, was scheduled from 11 to 17 February. The main speakers for the convention were Rt. Rev. Peter D. Eaton (Episcopalian Bishop, Southeast Florida Diocese); Rt. Rev. Dr. Soritua Nababan (Bishop Emeritus of Batak Christian Protestant Church, Indonesia and ex-officio of World Council of Churches) - cancelled; Bishop Robert Barron, Auxiliary Bishop of the Archdiocese of Los Angeles - cancelled; Rev. Dr. Francis Sunderaraj, (Methodist minister, Chennai-Malaysia); Rev. Dr. Vinod Victor (CSI Church, Melbourne Diocese) and Evg. Dr.h.c. Ramachandran Rajkumar (Independent Evangelist, Logos Ministries, Delhi).

=== 2017 ===
The main speakers for the 122nd Maramon Convention were theologians, Cleophus J. LaRue Jr. (Professor at Princeton Theological Seminary and NBCA minister); Leslie Griffiths (Methodist minister and Life peer), Edward-Mukondeleli Ramulondi (UPCSA Minister and Regional Director, Council for World Mission - Congregational Federation) and John Stephen Sadananda (CSI, Bishop Emeritus and Head of Serampore University College).

=== 2016 ===
The 121st Maramon Convention, is scheduled from 14 to 21 February. The theme of the convention is about living as Symbols of Christian Values in society and growing towards ecologically sustainable development, enhancing it with age-old practice of backyard farming and sustainable agriculture. Noted speakers that will deliver discourses at the convention are Bishop Daniel Thyagaraja, CSI Church, Sri Lanka; Rev Malcom T H Tan, Methodist Church, Singapore (Mission Society Trainer); Dr Leonard Sweet, Methodist Church, United States (Pastor & Theologian), Rev Francis Sundaraj, EFI, Chennai (Ecumenist) and Rev. D. Ratnakara Sadananda, CSI Church, Chennai (Gen. Secretary & Theologian).

Bishops attached to the Malankara Mar Thoma Syrian Church and other Churches will address various sessions of the meet. Heads of various Churches will address in the ecumenical sessions and various personalities attached to social welfare and empowerment like P. J. Kurien, D. Babu Paul...etc. will handle relevant topics.

=== 2015 ===
The 120th Maramon Convention was scheduled from 8 to 15 February. Main Speakers of the meeting are Bishop Ziphozihle D. Siwa, Methodist Church, S.A. (President of the South African Council of Churches and Revivalist); Rev. Dr. Leonard Sweet, USA (Semiotician & Best-selling Author) - cancelled - substituted by Rev. Fr. Dushantha Rodrigo, Church of Ceylon, Sri Lanka (Youth Ministry) and Pr. Dr. Sam T. Kamaleson, Tamil Nadu-USA (Evangelist, Mission Director, Musician, Lecturer, Ministry Mentor/Annan:-Elder brother)
Bishops of the Malankara Mar Thoma Syrian Church and various other Churches would address different sessions of the meet, including various personalities attached to Ecumenism.
Special Guest: Patriarch Moran Mor Ignatius Aphrem II, Patriarch of Antioch.

=== 2014 ===
The 119th Maramon Convention was from 9 to 16 February on the vast sand bed of the Pampa River near Kozhencherry. Main speakers, in addition to the bishops of the Mar Thoma Church were Bishop Dulip D Chikera (Sri Lanka), Rev. Peter Maiden (England) and Rev. Vyani Naibola (South Africa)

=== 2013 ===
The 118th Maramon Convention was from 10 to 17 February on the vast sand bed of the Pampa River. Main speakers, in addition to the bishops of the Mar Thoma Church were Rev. Canon Philip Mounstephen (U.K), Rev. Dr Walter Altmann (IECL, Brazil) and Rev. Andile Madodomzi Mbete (South Africa)

=== 2012 ===
The 117th Maramon Convention was held from 12 to 19 February on the vast sand-bed of the Pampa River next to the Kozhencherry Bridge. at Maramon.

The main speakers were Bishop Malusi Mpumlwana (South Africa), Dr. Kang San Tan (Professor and Mission Director) and Dr. Martin Alphonse (Pastor and Professor, Methodist Church)

=== 2011 ===
The 116th Maramon Convention was held from 13 to 20 February. Main speakers were the bishops of the Malankara Mar Thoma Syrian Church; Most Rev. Roger Herft, Anglican Archbishop of Perth; Australia; Prof. Nyameko Barney Pityana, a human rights lawyer, theologian in South Africa and an exponent of Black theology; Dr. R. Rajkumar; Rev. Peter Maiden; Dr. Ulf Ekman.

=== 2010 ===
The 115th Maramon Convention was held from 14 to 21 February. On the opening day and on the last three days, the pandal (flat roof thatched by woven coconut leaves) that could accommodate almost 80,000 people overflowed and an equal number found accommodation under the tree shades on both sides of the river.

The speakers included the Bishops of the Malankara Mar Thoma Syrian Church; Bishop Robert M Solomon, (Methodist Church, Singapore); Reverend Canon Tim Dakin, (General Secretary of Church Missionary Society, England), Pr. Dr. Martin Alphonse (Tamil Nadu-USA) and Rev. Vinod Victor, (Youth Evangelist, Trivandrum, Kerala, India). Bishop Yoohanon Mar Chrysostom, Metropolitan of the Marthandom Diocese of Syro-Malankara Catholic Church addressed the Ecumenical Meeting and Bishop Sebastian Thekethecheril of the Latin Catholic Diocese of Vijayapuram addressed the Social Evils Awareness Meeting. Most Rev. Joris Vercammen, Archbishop of Utrecht, president of the Union of Utrecht (of Old Catholic Church), bishops from the Malabar Independent Syrian Church and bishops of Church of South India attended the meetings.

== Famous guest visit Maramon Convention ==
Famous guest Name	Visit year
Sundar Singh (missionary)	February, 1917
E. Stanley Jones	1921
Moran Mor Ignatius Aphrem II	February, 2015

== Special programmes ==
=== Social activities ===
The MTEA attaches greater importance to a crusade against social evils like violence and domestic abuse, inequality and awareness of equity, displaced morale, extreme consumerism, frantic celebrity culture, chronic alcoholism and substance abuse with an Indo-centric perspective and globalist outlook. In fact an afternoon session in the convention is exclusively devoted for programmes against such evils to help people to stand against such evils, to support those who are in such states and to take up initiative to raise voice and root out such evils. Besides there are special sessions and programs for focus groups in ecumenical concerns, and promotion of organic and sustainable farming zest, dalit integration activities, transgender empowerment, women and children upliftment.

=== Missionary responsibilities ===
The Church is constantly stepping up through these conventions to fulfill the missionary responsibilities and It has spread as service activities from Tibetan Border and in the northern end of Uttar Pradesh, to Kanya Kumari (Cape Comerin) in the South. Several social service and income generating institutions of the Church owe their origin to this annual get together at Maramon. Destitute homes, Ashrams, mission centres, hospitals, leprosy clinics, schools, and colleges have been started in and outside Kerala. The messages of the Maramon Convention provides a revived ideological and experiential faith in accordance to the need of the laity and period of time.

== Law and order ==
Police contingent is not required in the convention premises to maintain law and order, a vigilant committee of priests and elders circle around maintaining peace. Any changes in the convention program apart from the published daily program schedule through website is alerted through mobile messaging services for those who register, and important notices about lost items, wandered away children, bus timings, etc. are also alerted through this service from 2015.

== Financial matter ==
The panthal (tent), and the sheds are the voluntary contributions of the parishes nearby. Early on, offerings were collected in every meeting. Now it is collected in four of the 21 general meetings and a special collection from parishes in foreign lands. The collection is distributed to various organisations and missions of the church and also for the Bible society and CSSM.

== Conclusion ==
Some that attend the convention claim that they experience peace, the spiritual liveliness that is spread around the panthal (tent) & the mobility of the masses with tends to create a sense of equality. The unbroken prayer of the Laity is considered the grace behind the spiritual backbone of the convention. The Maramon Convention displays co-operation and union between different sections of Church in Kerala. It fosters an ecumenical outlook. It is also a source of spiritual inspiration and enlightenment for thousands.

== See also ==
- Malankara Marthoma Syrian Church
- Kadavil Malika
- Pathanamthitta
