= Episcopal Charities of Southeast Florida =

Charity of Episcopal Diocese of Southeast Florida, US

Episcopal Charities of Southeast Florida is the philanthropic and charitable outreach arm of the Episcopal Diocese of Southeast Florida. Originally the Southeast Florida Episcopal Foundation, the organization was founded in 1998 to assist parishes in developing planned giving programs. Its role expanded in 2000 with a $3 million bequest from Blair and Agnes Smith to be used to provide food, health care, shelter and clothing for the needy elderly and youth in the diocese. In 2006 the Foundation was renamed Episcopal Charities to reflect its broader role, and the following year it assumed responsibility for the Human Needs Fund of the diocese. So far, outreach programs sponsored by parishes in the diocese have received more than $1.4 million in grants to support human-needs services. Episcopal Charities of Southeast Florida now accepts donations directly and develops original programs that may involve multiple parishes. It also participates in disaster relief and assisted living care for seniors.
