= Episcopal Diocese of Honduras =

Diocese of the Episcopal Church in Honduras

Coordinates: 14°N 87°W

The Episcopal Diocese of Honduras is an Anglican diocese in Honduras. It forms part of Province IX of the Episcopal Church. The third and current bishop is Lloyd Emmanuel Allen. In 2024, the diocese reported average Sunday attendance (ASA) of 3,459 persons.

== Bishops ==
1. Hugo Pina-Lopez (1978–1980)
2. Leo Frade (1984–2000)
3. Lloyd Emmanuel Allen (2001–Present)
