= Calvin Schofield Jr. =

American Episcopalian bishop (1933–2026)

The Right Reverend Calvin Onderdonk Schofield Jr.
- Bishop of Southeast Florida
- Church: Episcopal Church
- Diocese: Southeast Florida
- Elected: November 4, 1978
- In office: 1980–2000
- Predecessor: James L. Duncan
- Successor: Leopold Frade
- Previous post: Coadjutor bishop of Southeast Florida (1979–80)

Orders
- Ordination: December 31, 1962 by Henry I. Louttit Sr.
- Consecration: March 23, 1979 by John Allin

Personal details
- Born: January 6, 1933 Delhi, New York, U.S.
- Died: October 5, 2026 (aged 93) Denver, Colorado, U.S.
- Denomination: Anglican
- Parents: Calvin Onderdonk Schofield Sr. & Mabel Lenton
- Spouse: Elaine Marie Fullerton (m. 1963)
- Children: 2
- Education: Hobart College, Berkeley Divinity School

Calvin Onderdonk Schofield Jr. (January 6, 1933 – October 5, 2026) was an American Episcopalian bishop. He was the second bishop of the Episcopal Diocese of Southeast Florida from 1980 to 2000, where he presided over the growth of Episcopal Church ministries to Latinos and Haitians, the ordination of the first female priest in the diocese and the recovery from Hurricane Andrew.

== Early life and education ==
Schofield was born in Delhi, New York, on January 6, 1933, the son of Calvin O. Schofield Sr. and his wife, Mabel Ellen Schofield. He is a member of the Onderdonk family of New York which produced two 19th-century bishops, Henry Ustick Onderdonk in the Episcopal Diocese of Pennsylvania and Benjamin Treadwell Onderdonk in the Episcopal Diocese of New York.

He attended Hobart College and received a B.A. in 1959. He studied theology at the Berkeley Divinity School at Yale University and received an M.Div. in 1962.

== Ministry ==
Schofield was ordained to the diaconate June 30, 1962, and to the priesthood December 31, 1962. He served as curate of St. Peter's Episcopal Church in St. Petersburg, Florida, from 1962 to 1964, when he left to become vicar of St. Andrew's Episcopal Church in Miami, Florida, where he stayed until he was elected bishop coadjutor of the Episcopal Diocese of South Florida and was consecrated on March 23, 1979. On January 1, 1980, he became the second bishop of Southeast Florida and served until his retirement in 2000. He also served as a chaplain in the United States Navy Reserve 1962–1985. As bishop of Southeast Florida, he established the Episcopal Church's first commission for Hispanic ministry, produced Sunday school materials in Spanish and introduced Spanish-language Cursillo. He ordained the first female priest in the diocese, the Rev. Winnie Bolle, in 1982, and after Hurricane Andrew caused $32 billion in damage to southern Florida, he presided over local parishes' reconstruction and recovery.

He received honorary degrees from his alma maters, Berkeley Divinity School and Hobart College, as well as an honorary doctorate from the University of the South, Sewanee, Tennessee.

== Personal life and death ==
Schofield married Elaine Fullerton on August 3, 1963, and they had two children. After his retirement in 2000, Schofield continued to assist with episcopal functions before relocating permanently to Colorado. He died in Denver on October 5, 2026, at the age of 93.

Episcopal Church (USA) titles
Preceded by James L. Duncan	2nd Bishop of Southeast Florida; 1980–2000	Succeeded by Leopold Frade
