= James Duncan (bishop) =

American bishop

The Right Reverend James Loughlin Duncan
- Bishop of Southeast Florida
- Church: Episcopal Church
- Diocese: Southeast Florida
- Elected: May 28, 1969
- In office: 1969–1980
- Successor: Calvin O. Schofield, Jr.
- Previous post: Suffragan Bishop of South Florida (1961-1969)

Orders
- Ordination: July 1939 by Henry J. Mikell
- Consecration: December 20, 1961 by Arthur C. Lichtenberger

Personal details
- Born: James Loughlin Duncan; September 11, 1913 Greensboro, North Carolina, United States
- Died: July 20, 2000 (aged 86) Miami, Florida, United States
- Denomination: Anglican
- Parents: Robert Duncan & Mary O'Loughlin
- Spouse: Evelyn Burgess (m. 1943, d. 1967); Elaine Gaither (m. 1967)
- Children: 3

James Loughlin Duncan (September 11, 1913 – July 20, 2000), the first Bishop of Southeast Florida, was born in Greensboro, North Carolina, the son of Scottish and Irish immigrants Robert Duncan and his wife, Mary (O'Loughlin) Duncan. He died in 2000, a resident of Coral Gables, Florida.

== Education ==
James Loughlin Duncan attended Emory University and received a Bachelor of Arts (BA) in 1935 and a Master of Arts (MA) in 1936. He studied theology at the University of the South, in Sewanee, Tennessee and received a Bachelor of Divinity (BD) in 1939, and an honorary Doctor of Divinity in 1962. He was an initiate of the Kappa chapter of the Kappa Alpha Order, later transferring to the Epsilon chapter, and finally to the Alpha Alpha chapter. From 1955-1957 he served as the Knight Commander of the Order.

== Ministry ==
James L. Duncan was ordained to the diaconate in July 1938 and to the priesthood in July 1939, both by Bishop Henry J. Mikell of Atlanta. He served as curate of All Saints Episcopal Church, Atlanta, Georgia, from 1939 to 1940, when he left to become rector of St. Peter's Episcopal Church, in Rome, Georgia, where he stayed until 1945. From 1945 to 1950, he was rector of All Saints Episcopal Church, in Winter Park, Florida, His last rectorship at St. Peter's Episcopal Church, in St. Petersburg, Florida began in 1950 and ended in 1961 when he was elected suffragan bishop of the Episcopal Diocese of South Florida. In 1969, he was elected the first bishop of the newly formed Episcopal Diocese of Southeast Florida and served until he retired in 1980.

After retirement, Duncan remained active in the diocese. He served on the board of Trinity Episcopal School (now Palmer Trinity School) and taught seventh grade religion there from 1983 to 1985.

The Duncan Center in Delray Beach, Florida, is named in his honor.

== Family ==
James L. Duncan married Evelyn Burgess on July 27, 1943. They had three children, and eight grand-children. She died in January 1967, and Duncan married Elaine Lucille Beisler Gaither on October 7, 1967 (Elaine is the maternal grandmother of actor Billy Crudup).

== See also ==
- Succession of Bishops of the Episcopal Church in the United States

Episcopal Church (USA) titles
New title	Bishop of Southeast Florida; 1969–1980	Succeeded by Calvin O. Schofield, Jr.
