= Radio Peace =

English radio station

Coordinates: 25.8517°N 80.2007°W

Radio Peace is the English radio station of the Catholic Archdiocese of Miami. It is the sister station of the Spanish language Radio Paz. Radio Peace was founded in 1993.

Radio Peace is broadcast over South Florida & as well as over the Internet 24 hours per day.
