= Kadavil Malika =

Coordinates: 9.335443°N 76.608104°E

- Kadavil Malika, associated with the origin of Maramon Convention
- Interactive map of Kadavil Malika
- Location: Kallissery, Chengannur, Alappuzha district, Kerala, India

History
- Built: early 19th century

Site notes
- Restored: 10 September 2005
- Restored by: Malankara Mar Thoma Syrian Church
- Governing body: Malankara Mar Thoma Syrian Church

Kadavil Malika is a historic place in India, associated with the origin of the Maramon Convention. It is a house in Kallissery on the banks of River Pamba and was built by Unnittan Kathanar (1767–1852) and his son Abraham Kathanar (1822–1884) also known as Kadavil Achen, in the early 19th century.

By 1877, there were two factions in the Malankara Church, known as Methran Kakshi and Bava Kakshi. By a court verdict on 12 July 1889, Methran Kakshi lost all the properties. Just before the verdict was given, on 5 September 1888, 12 members of the Methran Kakshi formed a missionary group called "Mar Thoma Evangelistic Association." This Missionary Movement was started in the wake of the Reformation Movement pioneered by Abraham Malpan, often known as "the Martin Luther of the East". It marked the resurgence of the Ancient Church in Kerala and has given new life and inspiration for the total renewal and mission of the Malankara Mar Thoma Syrian Church.

The 12 founding members met at Kadavil Malika, the house of Chempakassseril Kadavil Mathuchen (1860–1897) and Chempakasseril Kadavil Abraham (sons of Abraham Kathanar and grandsons of Unnithan Kathanar).

These 12 members are considered to be the founding fathers of the Maramon convention. The names of these 12 members are:-

1. Kottarathil Thomas Kasseessa, Chengannur
2. Edavamvelil Mathai, Eraviperoor.
3. Kottooreth Yohannan, Chengannur
4. Chempakasseril Kadavil Abraham, Kallissery
5. Chakkalayil Cherian Upadesi, Puthencavu
6. Chempakasseril Kadavil Mathuchen, Kallissery.
7. Azhakinal Thommi, Kallooppara
8. Nathaniel Upadesi, Chengannur
9. Kurichiath (Vattadiyil) Ittiyavara, Niranam
10. Arangat Philipose, Maramon
11. Ottaplammoottil Kunju Mathew, Kallissery
12. Kochumannil Skariah, Edayaranmula

This historic Kadavil Malika was reclaimed by the Mar Thoma Church and was renovated and recommissioned on Saturday, 10 September 2005.

== See also ==
- Malankara Marthoma Syrian Church
- Maramon Convention
