= Thiruvanvandoor =

- Town
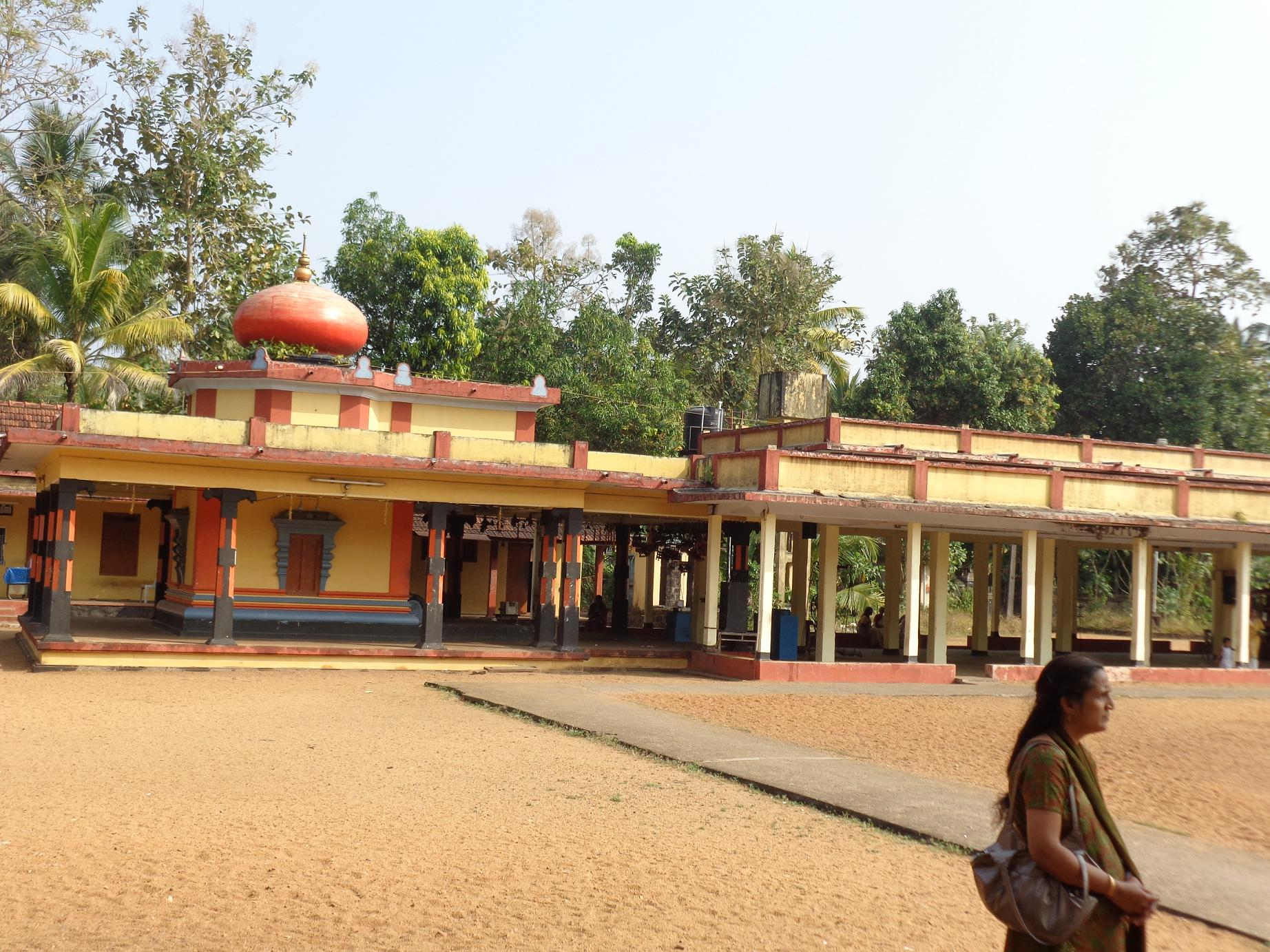
- Thiruvan Gosalakri
- Interactive map of Thiruvanvandoor
- Coordinates: 9°20′35.56″N 76°34′43.47″E
- Country: India
- State: Kerala
- District: Chengannur

Government
  - Type: Panchayat

Area
  - Total: 4.01 sq mi (10.39 km^{2})

Population (2011)
  - Total: 12,712
  - Density: 3,447.7/sq mi (1,331.18/km^{2})
- Time zone: UTC+5.30 (IST)
- Post code: 689109
- Area code: 0479
- Vehicle Code: (KL-30)
- Website: alappuzha.gov.in

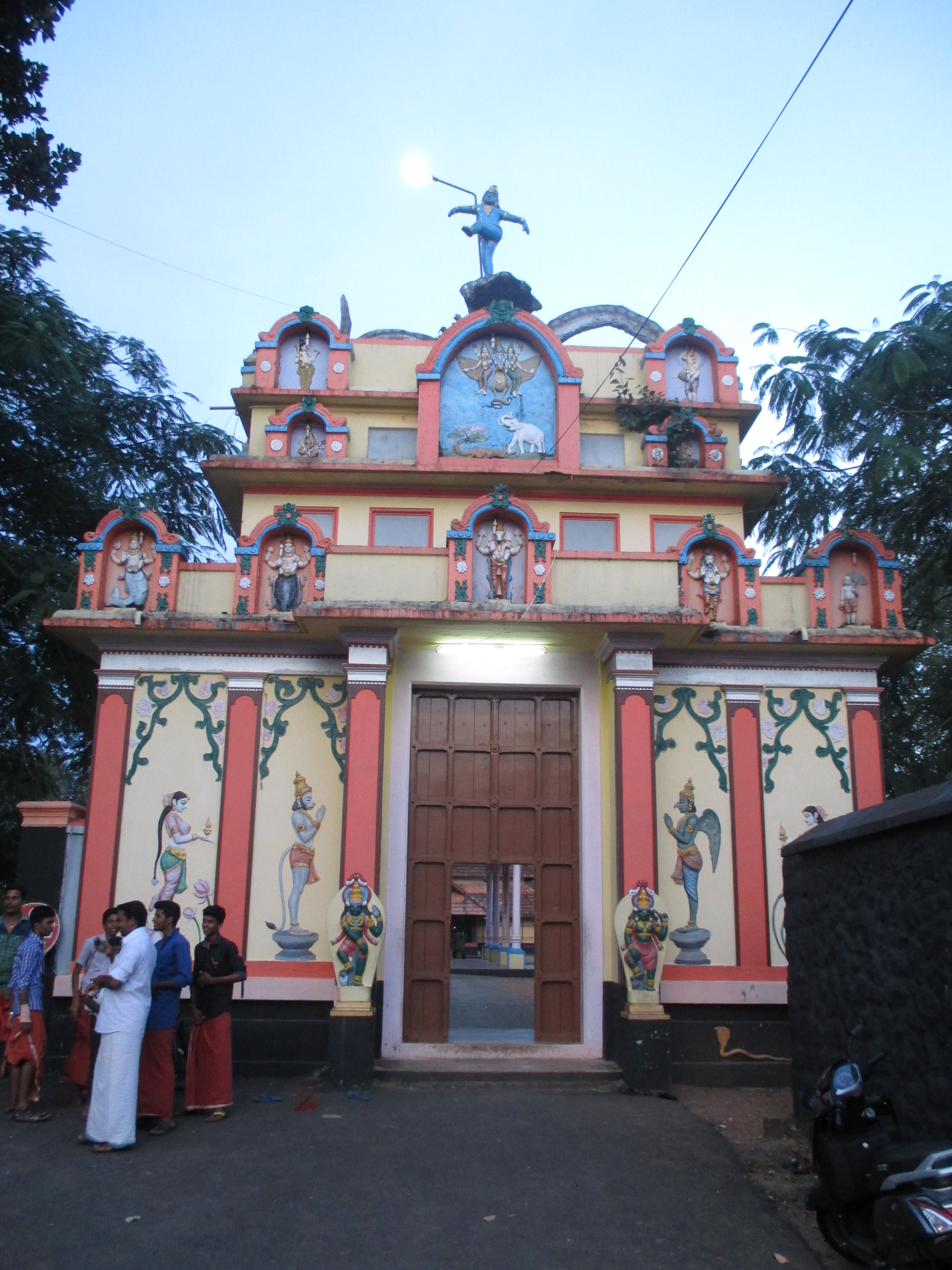
Thiruvanvandoor Temple

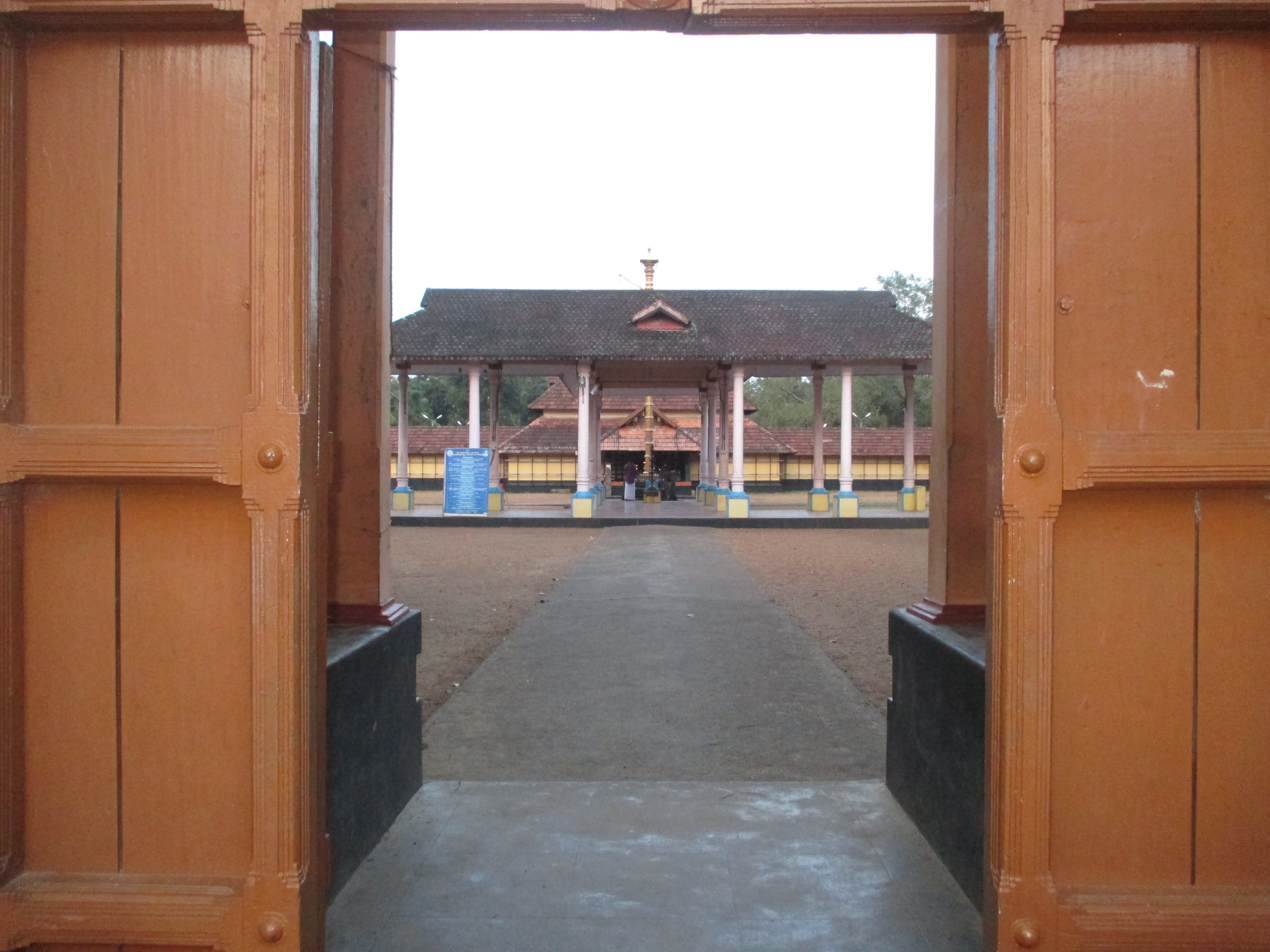
Pambanaiappan Temple

Thiruvanvandoor (pronounced [ðeːruʋan̪-ʋaɳɖuːr]) is a village near Thiruvalla, in Chengannur Taluk in Alappuzha district, in Kerala, India.

== Region ==
The village of Thiruvanvandoor is connected with Main Central Road at two junctions on the road. One is at Kallissery and other is at Pravin Coodu. Kallissery is the major town in Thiruvanvandoor.

== Religion ==
=== Hinduism ===
Thiruvanvandoor lies near Pandanad, Kerala which is believed to be founded by the Pandavas during their exile period. The region of Pandanad and neighboring villages have many Hindu temples Vanavathukkara that bear historic and architectural value. A popular temples in the Thiruvanvandoor region are Thiruvanvandoor Mahashetram and Sree Gosalakrishna Temple.

==== Thiruvanvandoor Mahashetram and Sree Gosalakrishna Temple ====
sree gosalakrishna temple is the famous temple nearer to the ancient temple Thiruvanvandoor Mahashetram build by pandava (nakula), these two temples are in the same compound, nakula worshipped lord vishnu at the time of vanavasam . gosalakrishna temple was built about 50 years ago by the devotees of different kara (villages). A major event is the annual festival where temple elephants are used. The temple is administered by Travancore Devaswom Board of the Government of Kerala. Every year on 19 May Gajamela is conducted on the last day of the temple festival.

=== Christianity ===
The St. George Orthodox Syrian Church (commonly known as Kochupally), established in 1956, is a prominent parish in Thiruvanvandoor. It belongs to the Chengannur Diocese of the Malankara Orthodox Syrian Church. The parish serves as a spiritual, social, and charitable hub for the local Christian community in the region.

== Demographics ==
As of 2011 India census, Thiruvanvandoor had a population of 12712 with 5972 males and 6740 females.
