= Kallissery =

Kallissery Umayattukara
- Town
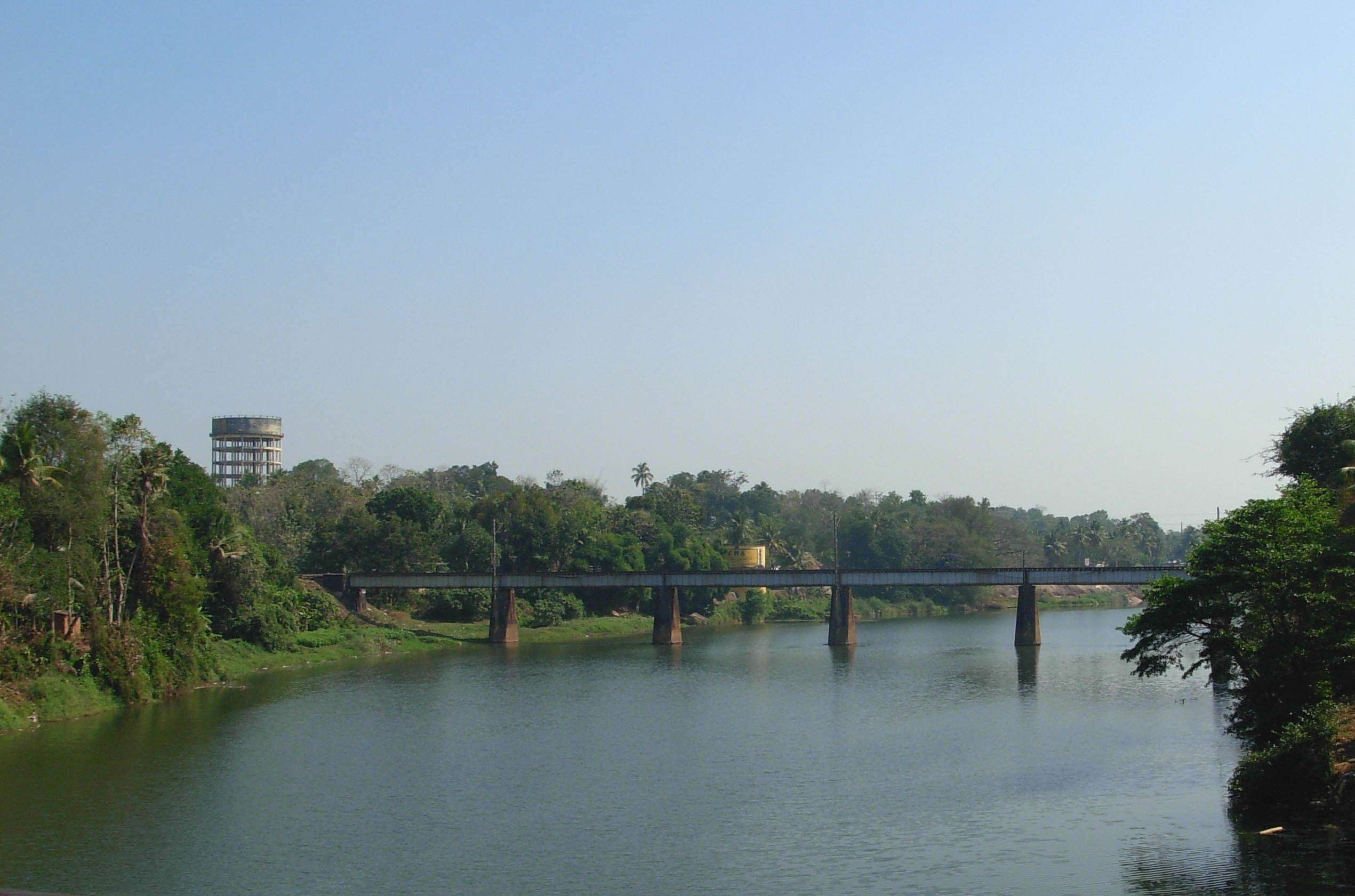
- River Pampa at Kallissery
- Interactive map of Kallissery
- Coordinates: 9°20′16.36″N 76°36′6.51″E
- Country: India
- State: Kerala
- District: Alappuzha

Government
  - Type: Alappuzha District , Thiruvanvandoor
- Time zone: UTC+5.30 (IST)
- Post code: 689124
- Area code: 0479
- Vehicle Code: (KL-30)
- Website: http://alappuzha.gov.in/

Kallissery (English: /kælɪˈsɛri/; IPA: [kalliɕeːɾi]) is a small town in Chengannur Taluk of Alappuzha district of Kerala, India.

== Location ==
Kallissery is a town on the MC ROAD part of the Thiruvanvandoor village in the district of Alleppey and is a prominent area of local business. Kallissery is in the Thiruvanvandoor Panchayatu. It is part of the Chengannur legislative assembly constituency. It was famous for its local markets. The old bridge was built during the British period across the river pampa was recently closed and a new wider bridge was built for traffic along MC Road. Saji Cherian -Communist Party of India (Marxist) is the current MLA. In Lok Sabha, Kallissery is represented by the sitting MP from Mavelikkara, Mr Kodikunnil Suresh (Indian National Congress).

== Economy ==
Kallissery is one of the wealthiest rural settlements in India. Remittance from NRIs is the primary source of income. Kallissery holds importance in the local community as it serves both as a village marketplace and an upcoming development. It connects Chengannur to Thiruvalla via the Main Central Road. Kallissery was an important trading center for timber, coconut, hill produce, copra, coconut oil and other crops. A large amount of trade happened in late the 1980s and early 1990s, with Alleppey port and later with Kochi through the Pamba River.

== Religious History and Tourism ==
Kallissery is known for religious tourism. The famous chathayam vallamkali is being celebrated in kallissery in the month of chingam every year. There are number of chundan vallam (famous as palliyodam) owned by Karayogams which are taking part in the aranmula uthrattadi vallamkali at aranmula every year as a ritual w.r.t Aranmula Temple. The famous Anjilimoottil Itty Thommen Kathanar (priest), one of the most noteworthy leaders of the Malankara church who bravely resisted the Portuguese persecutions in the 17th century, was buried in Kallissery pally.

The area is also famous for Kadavil Malika, which was historic in starting the Maramon Convention. The citizens of Kallissery played an important role in the early social struggles in Kerala. The citizens of Kallissery played in the Travancore Legislature like Travancore Sri Mulam Assembly, the Sri Chithra Travancore State Legislative Council, Travancore Sri Mulam Assembly and later after independence, there were representatives in Rajya Sabha and Kerala Legislative. Kallissery is also the native place of Dr. Justice T. Kochu Thommen Thamarappallil (former Judge, Supreme Court of India and Indian human rights commissioner).

== Places of worship ==
- Umayattukavu Devi Temple
- Sri Mutharamman Devi Temple
- Sri Narayana Guru Mandiram
- St. Mary's Knanaya Valiyapally Kallissery
- St. Thomas Malankara Syrian Catholic Church, Umayattukara, Kallissery
- Azhakiya Kavu Temple
- Mazhukeermel Vishnu Kshetram
- Umayattukara St Thomas Orthodox Valiyapally Kallissery
- Indian Pentecostal Church Of God (IPC) Ebenezer, Kallissery
- Umayattukara Marthoma Church, Kallissery
- Kallissery Brethren Assembly
- Christian Brethren Church, Umayattukara, Kallissery
- Umayattukara Brethren Assembly, Kallissery
- Mazhukeer Brethren Church
- Brethren Assembly Kallissary East

== Hospital ==
K.M. Cheriyan Hospital, Umayattukara, Kallissery

== Educational organizations ==
- Kallissery Vocational Higher Secondary School
- Brethren Theological College, Kallissery
- Ebenezer English Medium High School
- ST.Marys School Kallissery
- Government U.P.S Kallissery

== Area ==
Kallissery held an importance in the common economy of the village folk from Prayar, Thiruvanvandoor and neighbouring villages as it was a local market. As Kallissery is located along the M.C. Road, it serves as an important KSRTC bus stop and landmark for various businesses in the area.

== Towns ==
The nearest municipal towns are Chengannur (2 km from Kallissery) and Thiruvalla (6.5 km from Kallissery)

== Boat racing ==
Kallissery has 5 Palliyodams (snake boats) owned by different "Karas" (locality): Umayattukara, Mazhukeer, Keezhuvanmazhy, Vanmazhy, Muthavazhy and Prayar. Among those, Umayattukara has the biggest one.

== Rail ==
The nearest Railway Station is Chengannur Railway station, which is only 2 kilometers from Kallissery.

== Air ==
The nearest airport is Trivandrum International airport, which is about 118 kilometres (73 mi) from Kallissery. Another nearby airport is Cochin International Airport (CIAL), which is about 124 km (77 mi) from Kallissery.
