= Peter Eaton =

American Episcopal bishop (born 1958)

The Right Reverend Peter David Eaton
- Bishop of Southeast Florida
- Church: Episcopal Church
- Diocese: Southeast Florida
- Elected: January 31, 2015
- In office: 2016–present
- Predecessor: Leo Frade
- Previous post: Coadjutor Bishop of Southeast Florida (2015-2016)

Orders
- Ordination: June 29, 1987 by Robert Runcie
- Consecration: May 9, 2015 by Katharine Jefferts Schori

Personal details
- Born: Peter David Eaton; August 28, 1958 (age 68) Washington, D.C., United States
- Denomination: Anglican
- Parents: Wade Eaton & Judith Morse Goldman
- Spouse: Kate Gleason

Peter David Eaton (born August 28, 1958) is the fourth and current bishop of the Episcopal Diocese of Southeast Florida.

== Early life ==
The son of Wade Eaton, an Episcopal priest in the Episcopal Diocese of Puerto Rico, and the late Judith Morse Goldman, Eaton was born in Washington, D.C., on August 28, 1958. He was raised in Barbados, in the United States, including San Juan, Puerto Rico, and the United Kingdom. He is the grandson of Wayne Morse, who served as a United States Senator from Oregon from 1944 to 1969, and the nephew of Francisco Reus-Froylán, who was the first native-born Puerto Rican Episcopal Bishop of Puerto Rico from 1964 to 1989. In addition to English, Eaton has a working knowledge of Spanish and French, as well as other classical and ancient languages.

He obtained a Bachelor of Arts degree in 1982 in the Classics from King's College London, and was elected an Associate of King's College (AKC). In 1985 he obtained a Bachelor of Arts in Theology from Queens' College, Cambridge.

== Career ==
Eaton was trained for the priesthood and obtained a Certificate in Theology at Westcott House, Cambridge, and was ordained deacon on June 29, 1986, by his uncle, Reus-Froylán, at St John's Episcopal Cathedral, San Juan. On June 29, 1987 he was ordained priest at Canterbury Cathedral by Robert Runcie, Archbishop of Canterbury. After a curacy at All Saints, Maidstone, Kent, he served as Fellow's Chaplain at Magdalen College, Oxford, from 1989 to 1991, where he also did graduate research in Early Christian history and literature. Before being elected on the fourth ballot among 6 candidates and being consecrated as Bishop Coadjutor, he served as Associate Rector of St Paul's Episcopal Church in Salt Lake City, Utah from 1991 to 1995, and Honorary Canon Theologian to the Bishop of Utah from 1991 to 2001. In 1995 he became the 20th Rector of St James Church, Lancaster, Pennsylvania, before serving as Dean of St John's Cathedral, Denver, Colorado since 2002. He was also an adjunct professor at Illiff School of Theology in Denver and a Fellow-in-Residence at the School of Theology in Sewanee, Tennessee in 1995 and 2014. In September 2004, he married Kate Gleason, a singer, songwriter, and fundraiser, as well as President and founder of Mishkhah, an organization committed to helping churches establish new worshipping communities.

Eaton's consecration was held on May 9, 2015, the Feast of St. Gregory the Theologian, at Trinity Episcopal Cathedral, Miami, Florida. The Chief Consecrator was Katharine Jefferts Schori, Presiding Bishop of the Episcopal Church, and the principal co-consecrators were Leopold Frade, the outgoing bishop of the diocese, and Robert J. O'Neill, Bishop of Colorado. Thirty-nine other bishops served as co-consecrators, including four from churches in full communion with the Episcopal Church: Bishop Hans Gerny of the Old Catholic Union of Utrecht, Bishop Geevarghese Mar Theodosius of the Mar Thoma Syrian Church of Malabar, Bishop Robert G. Schaefer of the Evangelical Lutheran Church in America and Bishop Graham H. Rights of the Moravian Church in North America. This was an historic liturgy, being the first time that bishops of these four churches have joined Episcopal bishops in the ordination of an Episcopal bishop. This ordination also united the ancient historic successions of the Old Catholic Church, the Mar Thoma Syrian Church and the Anglican Communion.

Bishops from the Church of England, Spain, the Province of the West Indies, Haiti, the Dominican Republic and Puerto Rico (both Provisional Bishop Wilfrido Ramos-Orench as well as retired Bishop David A. Alvarez-Velázquez), jurisdictions with large populations in Southeast Florida, were present and served as co-consecrators.

Eaton succeeded Frade as IV Diocesan Bishop on January 9, 2016. Eaton was seated in a three-hour service that was ecumenical and interfaith in nature on January 30, 2016, at Trinity Cathedral in Miami. Rowan Williams, the 104th Archbishop of Canterbury preached. Bishops from throughout The Episcopal Church, the Anglican Communion and churches in communion with Anglicans attended; some coming from as far as Africa. Bishop Eaton invited all the priests of the diocese to concelebrate the Eucharist. Eaton was escorted in and out of the service by the youth from throughout the diocese. The service ended with a Blessing of the City and a full peal of the change ringing bells; which took three hours to complete. Both Tomás Regalado and Congresswoman Frederica Wilson greeted Eaton. Regalado presented a proclamation declaring January 30 "Peter David Eaton Day" in Miami. During his tenure as Bishop Coadjutor, he began to familiarize himself with his upcoming duties as Diocesan Bishop, including meetings with members of Florida's Congressional delegation in Washington.

As has been customary for over half a century, Bishop Eaton's diocese gave the current Presiding Bishop, Michael Curry, a Primatial Cross which Eaton had designed and crafted in the town of Bethlehem in the Holy Land.

== See also ==
- List of Episcopal bishops of the United States
- Historical list of the Episcopal bishops of the United States
