= Episcopal Diocese of Southeast Florida =

Episcopal Church diocese in the US

Coordinates: 25.789907°N 80.186480°W

Diocese of Southeast Florida

Location
- Country: United States
- Ecclesiastical province: Province IV

Statistics
- Congregations: 74 (2024)
- Members: 25,810 (2023)

Information
- Denomination: Episcopal Church
- Established: October 8, 1969
- Cathedral: Trinity Episcopal Cathedral, Miami

Current leadership
- Bishop: Peter Eaton

Map
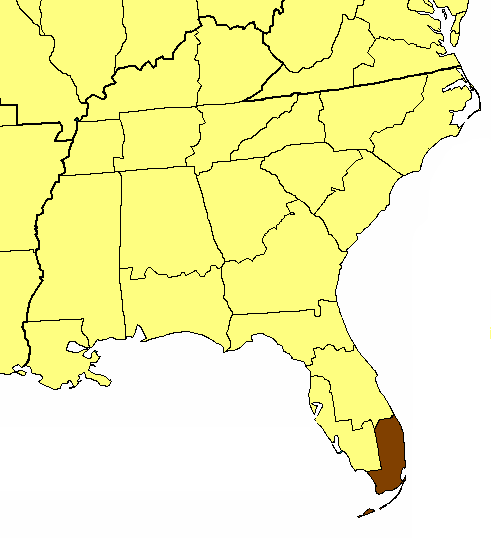
- Location of the Diocese of Southeast Florida

Website
- www.diosef.org

The Episcopal Church in Southeast Florida is a diocese of the Episcopal Church in the United States of America (ECUSA) which extends from Key West, Florida on the south, to Jensen Beach on the north and inland to Clewiston on the west. Major cities in the diocese are Miami, Fort Lauderdale and West Palm Beach. The diocese takes in all of Miami-Dade County, Broward County, Palm Beach County, and Martin County, along with the Florida Keys portion of Monroe County and the eastern part of Hendry County. The diocese is a part of Province IV of the Episcopal Church.

The current diocesan bishop of Southeast Florida is Peter Eaton. The cathedral church of the diocese is Trinity Episcopal Cathedral, Miami. The philanthropic outreach arm of the Episcopal Church in Southeast Florida is Episcopal Charities of Southeast Florida.

The diocese reported 32,883 members in 2015 and 25,810 members in 2023; no membership statistics were reported in 2024 national parochial reports. Plate and pledge income for the 74 filing congregations of the diocese in 2024 was $22,314,604. Average Sunday attendance (ASA) in 2024 was 7,094 persons, a relative decrease from the reported 11,900 in 2015.

== History ==
The Diocese of Southeast Florida was created in 1969 when the Diocese of South Florida was split to form the dioceses of Central Florida, Southwest Florida and Southeast Florida.

== Bishops of the Diocese ==
The bishops of the Diocese of Southeast Florida are:

- 1970-1980 James L. Duncan; was Suffragan Bishop of Episcopal Diocese of South Florida 1961-1969
- 1980-2000 Calvin Schofield Jr.
- 2000-2016 Leo Frade
- 2016 - to date Peter Eaton; was coadjutor 2015–2016

NOTE: For earlier bishops, see the Episcopal Diocese of South Florida

== Deaneries ==
The diocese is divided into six deaneries each headed by a dean and named as follows:

1. The Keys (the Florida Keys portion of Monroe County);
2. South Dade (southern Miami-Dade County);
3. North Dade (northern Miami-Dade County);
4. Broward (Broward County);
5. South Palm Beach (southern Palm Beach County); and
6. North Palm Beach (northern Palm Beach County, a portion of eastern Hendry County and all of Martin County).

== See also ==
- Christianity
- Anglican Communion

== Bibliography ==
- Cushman, Joseph D., Jr., A Goodly Heritage: The Episcopal Church in Florida, 1821-1892, Gainesville: University of Florida Press (1965)
