= Francisco Reus-Froylan =

Religious leader

The Right Reverend Francisco Reus-Froylan S.T.D.
- Bishop of Puerto Rico
- Church: Episcopal Church
- Diocese: Puerto Rico
- Elected: November 1, 1964
- In office: 1965–1989
- Predecessor: A. Ervine Swift
- Successor: David Álvarez
- Previous post: Coadjutor Bishop of Puerto Rico (1964-1965)

Orders
- Ordination: August 15, 1943 by Charles B. Colmore
- Consecration: November 30, 1964 by Arthur C. Lichtenberger

Personal details
- Born: April 14, 1919 Santurce, Puerto Rico
- Died: November 19, 2008 (aged 89) Largo, Florida
- Buried: Quebrada Limón
- Denomination: Anglican
- Spouse: Doreen Brewer
- Children: 3

Ordination history of Francisco Reus-Froylan
History
Episcopal consecration
- Consecrated by: Arthur C. Lichtenberger, A. Ervine Swift and Charles F. Boynton
- Date: 1964
Episcopal succession
Bishops consecrated by Francisco Reus-Froylan as principal consecrator
- William Frey: 1967
- G. Edward Haynsworth: 1969
- José Antonio Ramos: 1969
- Robert O. Miller: 1986
- David Andres Alvarez: 1987

Francisco Reus-Froylan (April 14, 1919 – November 19, 2008) was the fifth Bishop of Puerto Rico from 1965 to 1989.

== Early life and education ==
Reus-Froylan was born on April 14, 1919, in Santurce, Puerto Rico, the son of the Reverend Esteban Reus-Garcia. He was educated at the Pence High School and later at the University of Puerto Rico. he studied theology at the Dubois Church Training School in Tennessee and then continued at the Philadelphia Divinity School and the Episcopal Theological Seminary of the Caribbean.

== Service as deacon and priest ==
He was ordained deacon on November 15, 1942, by Bishop Charles B. Colmore of Puerto Rico and became curate at the Cathedral of St John the Baptist in San Juan, Puerto Rico.

He was ordained priest on August 15, 1943, by Charles B. Colmore and became assistant priest at St Andrew's Church in Mayagüez, Puerto Rico. In 1944 he became a missionary in charge of St Mark's Church in Ponce, Puerto Rico and in 1945 transferred to rector of the Church of the Atonement in Ponce, Puerto Rico.

From 1948 till 1954 he served as priest in charge of the Church of the Holy Family and teacher and chaplain at the Colegio San José in San Juan, Puerto Rico. He also spent some time as rector of St Hilda's Church in Trujillo Alto, Puerto Rico. In 1959 he became Dean of St John's Cathedral and rector of the Spanish speaking congregation. He also became director of the Episcopal Cathedral School and later rector of the English speaking congregation as well.

== Bishop ==
He was the last appointed bishop in Puerto Rico and the first native Puerto Rican to hold the post. Consecrated by Missouri Episcopal Bishop Arthur C. Lichtenberger, Bishops Charles F. Boynton and A. Ervine Swift, the third and fourth Diocesan Bishops of Puerto Rico, he served as Diocesan Bishop from 1964 to 1989. He was consecrated on November 30, 1964. During his 25-year rule, he presided over the process that led to the Diocese's separation from ECUSA in the late 1970s. His successor, the Right Rev. David Andres Alvarez subsequently presided over the process to reunite the "Iglesia Episcopal Puertorriqueña" that Bishop Reus had created, as a diocese of the U.S. national church.

== Death ==
He died on November 19, 2008, at the age of 89 after a bout with pneumonia. He was buried at the Episcopal cemetery at Barrio Limón in Ponce, Puerto Rico.

== See also ==
- List of Puerto Ricans - Religion

Episcopal Church (USA) titles
Preceded by A. Ervine Swift	Diocesan Bishop of Puerto Rico; 1965-1989	Succeeded by David Andres Alvarez
