= Episcopal Diocese of the Virgin Islands =

Anglican diocese in the Virgin Islands

Episcopal Diocese of the Virgin Islands Dioecesis Virginum Insularum EDVI
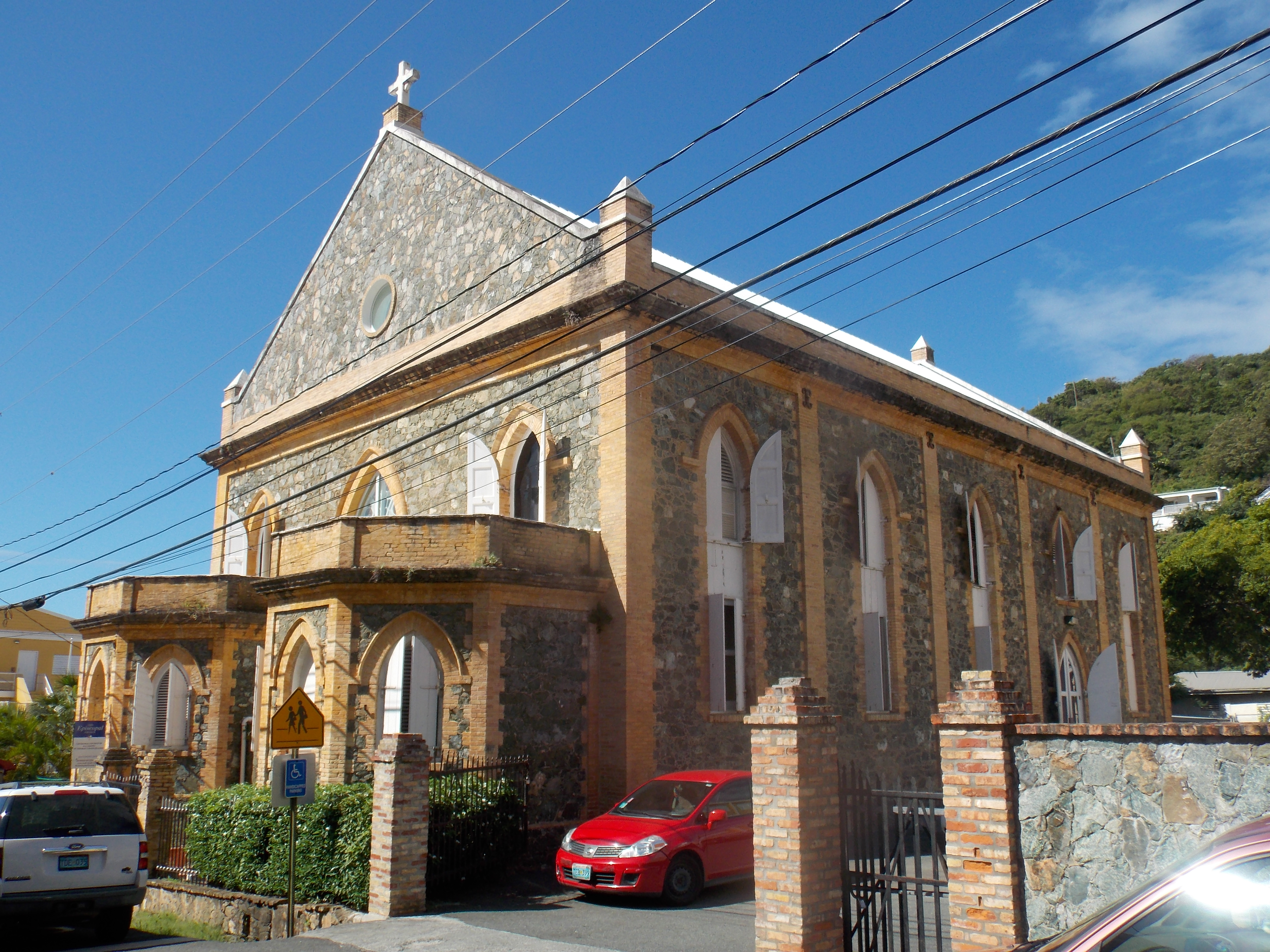
- Cathedral Church of All Saints in Charlotte Amalie

Location
- Country: United States; United Kingdom
- Territory: U.S. Virgin Islands; British Virgin Islands
- Ecclesiastical province: Province II
- Deaneries: 3
- Headquarters: 2313 Commandant Gade (Garden Street) Charlotte Amalie, St. Thomas USVI

Statistics
- Congregations: 13 (2022)
- Schools: 4
- Members: 1,989 (2022)

Information
- Denomination: Episcopal Church
- Established: 1919
- Cathedral: Cathedral Church of All Saints
- Language: English, Virgin Islands Creole, Spanish(minority)

Current leadership
- Bishop Advisor to the Virgin Islands Diocese: Rafael Morales Maldonado

Website
- edotvi.org

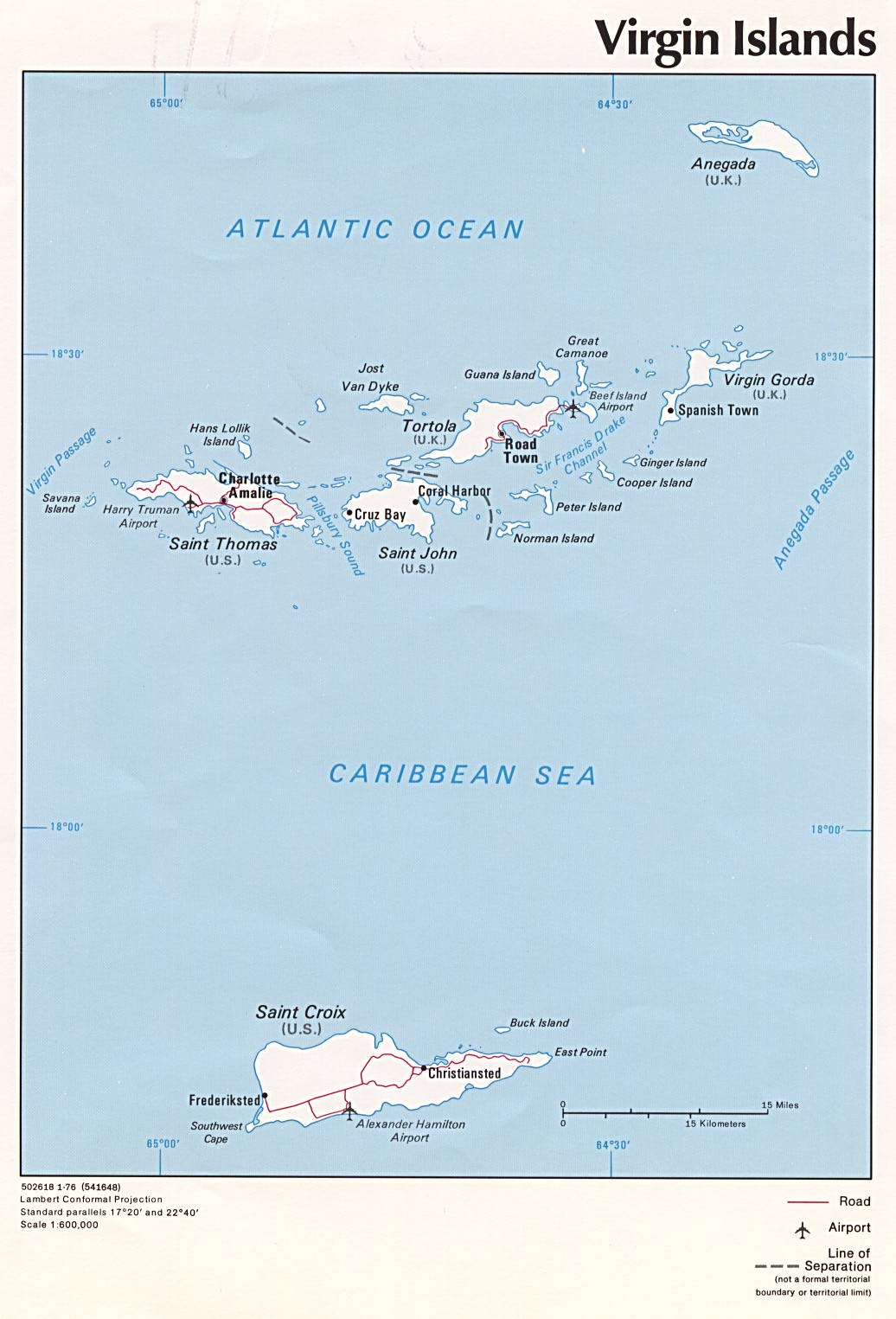

The Episcopal Diocese of the Virgin Islands is a diocese of the Episcopal Church in the United States of America (ECUSA/T.E.C) which includes both the United States Virgin Islands and the British Virgin Islands. The diocese is a part of Province II of the Episcopal Church. The previous Diocesan Bishop of the Virgin Islands was Edward Ambrose Gumbs; the seat is currently vacant but Rafael Morales from the Episcopal Diocese of Puerto Rico serves as Bishop Advisor. The cathedral church of the diocese is the Cathedral Church of All Saints, Charlotte Amalie. The diocese currently comprises 14 churches. No membership statistics were reported in 2024 Episcopal Church parochial reports.

== History ==
In 1917 when the United States bought the Danish West Indies from Denmark, the three Anglican parishes and one mission on the islands were under the Anglican Bishop of Antigua who was part of the Diocese of Barbados. As a result, the Bishop of Antigua, on 30 April 1919, transferred the ecclesiastical jurisdiction of the Churches of the Anglican Communion in those islands to the Protestant Episcopal Church in the United States of America. On 7 November 1947, the House of Bishops, assembled at Winston-Salem, North Carolina, gave jurisdiction over these churches to a Missionary District, called the Missionary District of the Virgin Islands. The Presiding Bishop appointed the Bishop of Puerto Rico as bishop-in-charge of the new mission district. By a Deed of Relinquishment the Archbishop of the West Indies on 24 November 1963 transferred ecclesiastical jurisdiction of the Anglican Churches in the British Virgin Islands to the Protestant Episcopal Church of the United States of America. In 1962 Cedric Mills was appointed Bishop of the Virgin Islands by the House of Bishops. He arrived in 1963 and assumed jurisdiction over all Anglican and Episcopal churches in the wider Virgin Islands. In November 1971 the diocese elected its own bishop for the first time, selecting Edward Mason Turner, rector of St. Paul's in Frederiksted. He was consecrated bishop in May 1972.

== Bishops of the Diocese ==
The Bishops of the Diocese are:

- 1. Cedric E. Mills (1962–1972);
- 2. Edward M. Turner (1972–1985);
  - Interim Bishop: Richard M. Martin (1985–1986);
- 3 E. Don Taylor, elected by the Bishops of Province II, (1986–1994)
  - Interim Bishop: Telésforo A. Isaac (1994–1997);
- 4. Theodore A. Daniels (1997–2003);
  - Interim Bishop: Telésforo A. Isaac (2004–2005); and
- 5. Edward Ambrose Gumbs (2005–2021).
- 6. Rafael Morales (2022-) Bishop Advisor

== Deaneries ==
The diocese is divided into three deaneries each headed by a regional dean and named as follows:

- 1. St. Thomas-St. John Deanery;
- 2. St. Croix Deanery; and
- 3. Virgin Islands (British) Deanery.

== Schools ==
All Saints Cathedral School is operated as a parish school on St. Thomas.

== See also ==
- Episcopal Church (United States)
- Anglican Communion
- All Saints Cathedral School
