= Onell Soto =

The Right Reverend Onell Asiselo Soto D.D.
- Bishop of Venezuela
- Church: Episcopal Church
- Diocese: Venezuela
- In office: 1987–1995
- Predecessor: Haydn Jones
- Successor: Orlando Guerrero Torres
- Other posts: Assistant Bishop of Atlanta (1995-2002); Assistant Bishop of Alabama (1999-2002)

Orders
- Ordination: August 18, 1965 by David Reed
- Consecration: July 11, 1987 by James Ottley

Personal details
- Born: November 17, 1932 Omaja, Cuba
- Died: August 5, 2015 (aged 82) Chicago, Illinois, United States
- Denomination: Anglican
- Parents: Juan Aurelio Soto Vega & María de Los Angeles Almaguer Mayo
- Spouse: Nina Ulloa
- Children: 4

Onell Asiselo Soto (November 17, 1932 – August 5, 2015) was an Episcopal bishop residing in Miami, Florida. Prior to his retirement in 2002 he was appointed by Henry N. Parsley to serve as Assistant Bishop of the Episcopal Diocese of Alabama, beginning on August 1.

He served in a similar position for four years in Atlanta. In 1987, he was elected bishop of the Anglican Church in Venezuela.

He died on August 5, 2015, in Chicago.

== Biography ==
Soto was born in 1932 in Omaja, a small town founded by American immigrants in the province of Oriente, Cuba. The son of Juan Aurelio Soto Vega and María de Los Angeles Almaguer Mayo, Soto spent his childhood in his hometown until 1938 when he moved with his family to a small town named San Agustín, where his father was head of the Army post.

He received his primary education in San Agustín's public school. In 1945 he won a scholarship to study in a rural training school in Victoria de las Tunas, a city 30 miles from home. After a year of study there, Soto entered the Methodist mission school in Omaja. He graduated with honors in 1947 and received a scholarship to study secondary education at Irene Toland School in Matanzas, 100 miles from Havana. Soto graduated with honors in 1952, and enrolled three months later at the University of Havana's School of Medicine where he completed four years of medical training.

In 1956 the university was closed for political reasons and was not opened until 1960, after the triumph of Fidel Castro's revolution.

In 1957, he left Cuba for the United States and enrolled in Boston University's College of Liberal Arts. In 1959, he returned to Cuba, and worked for two years as a chemistry technician at a flour mill in Havana.

On July 4, 1960, he married Nina Ulloa, director of Christian Education of the Episcopal Church in Cuba. In November of the same year, they left Cuba for the United States and settled in Sanatorium, Mississippi, where Soto worked as a medical assistant at the Mississippi State Sanatorium, a TB hospital. In August 1961, he entered the School of Theology of the University of the South at Sewanee, Tennessee. Soto paid part of his studies by teaching Spanish in two Episcopal High Schools while studying at Sewanee.

He received his Bachelor of Divinity degree in 1964 (later upgraded to Master's), and went to Austin, Texas, where he worked on a Master's degree at the Episcopal Theological Seminary of the Southwest.

He and his wife, Nina, became U.S. citizens on September 8, 1966 in San Antonio, Texas.

On St. Peter's Day, June 29, 1964, he was ordained deacon in Gadsden, Alabama, by George M. Murray, then Bishop of Alabama. On August 18, 1965 he was ordained priest in Bogotá, Colombia, by David B. Reed then Bishop of Colombia.

The Sotos arrived in Quito, Ecuador, as appointed missionaries of the Episcopal Church on September 15, 1965 where he became Vicar of St. Nicholas' Episcopal Church. He established the first Spanish-speaking congregation and organized a strong ecumenical movement in the city.

After serving for six years in Ecuador, he was appointed Executive Secretary of Province IX of the Episcopal Church in 1971. At that time the province consisted of the dioceses of Mexico, Central America, Ecuador, Colombia, the Dominican Republic and Puerto Rico. While in El Salvador, he organized the provincial office and set up a wide communication system throughout the province and the rest of Latin America. During this time he traveled widely and helped to foster better inter-Anglican and ecumenical relations through personal visits and communication.

He remained in El Salvador until December 18, 1977 when he was then appointed Mission Information and Education Officer of the World Mission Unit at the Episcopal Church Center in New York City. In that post, he had the opportunity to travel around the world as a mission reporter and interpreter.

In 1978, he was appointed mission information and education officer at the Episcopal Church Center in New York. During his 10-year tenure he visited almost every province of the Anglican Communion and produced World Mission News, a newsletter about Anglican affairs and the worldwide missionary work of the Church. He also founded Anglicanos, a similar publication in Spanish in 1984.

On March 11, 1987, he was elected bishop of the Diocese of Venezuela. His consecration took place on July 11, 1987 at St. Mary's Cathedral, Caracas. James Ottley, Bishop of Panama and President of Province IX, presided at the ceremony. The co-consecrators were Orland U. Lindsay, primate of the West Indies; Olavo V. Luiz, primate of Brazil; and Haydn Jones, retired bishop of Venezuela.

In October 1988, the University of the South awarded him a doctor of divinity degree honoris causa.

During his episcopate in Venezuela, he led the Church in that country from a chaplaincy church to a national church under Venezuelan leadership. His dreams were realized on April 8, 1995, when a special convention of the Church in Venezuela elected Orlando Guerrero, a 50-year-old priest, ordained in 1980, as the first Venezuelan national to be elected to the Anglican episcopate.

Before his departure from Caracas, the President of Venezuela, Rafael Caldera, granted him the Order of the Liberator Simón Bolívar for his contribution to "the moral and spiritual welfare" of the country.

As Assistant Bishop of Atlanta he worked closely with the diocesan, Frank Allan. Besides the normal pastoral work of the diocese, he helped in deployment, higher education, and ecumenical relations, Hispanic ministry and relations with the companion diocese of Ecuador.

In 1999 he accepted the invitation of the Diocese of Alabama to do the same ministry as assistant bishop after his retirement in Miami in 2002. He attended, in several capacities, all the General Conventions of the Episcopal Church since 1969.

Soto and his wife, Nina, a Christian educator also a native of Cuba, have four grown children and six grandchildren who live in the Chicago, Washington, San Diego and Sacramento. Nina is the editor of Día a Día, the Spanish version of Forward's Day by Day in Spanish.

From May 1, 1995 until his retirement in 2002, he was Assistant Bishop of Atlanta sharing the pastoral ministry with the diocesan, Frank Allan. The Diocese of Atlanta has 90 congregations and nearly 300 clergy. As Assistant Bishop, he helped in the episcopal ministry and served in deployment, higher education, ecumenical relations, Hispanic ministry and relations with the companion diocese of Ecuador.

Soto died on August 5, 2015, in Northwestern Memorial Hospital in Chicago IL. He was eighty-two years old.
