= Telésforo Isaac =

Dominican Episcopal bishop (1929–2025)

The Right Reverend Telésforo Alexander Isaac
- Bishop of the Episcopal Diocese of the Dominican Republic
- Church: The Episcopal Church
- Province: Province IX
- Installed: 1972
- Term ended: 1991
- Predecessor: Paul Axtell Kellogg
- Successor: Julio César Holguín

Orders
- Consecration: March 9, 1972

Personal details
- Born: January 5, 1929
- Died: July 4, 2025 (aged 96)

Telésforo Alexander Isaac (January 5, 1929 – July 4, 2025) was a bishop of the Diocese of the Dominican Republic in The Episcopal Church, serving from 1972 to 1991. He was ordained and consecrated on March 9, 1972 and was the first Dominican bishop in the Anglican Communion.

== Biography ==
Isaac was born on January 5, 1929. He established the Centro de Estudios Teológicos (Center for Theological Studies) in Santo Domingo in 1978. In 1985, along with the Dominican Association for Rehabilitation, he led the diocese in a polio vaccination campaign for children from birth to five years old. He was also the author of Consejería Pastoral Noutética, an anthology of articles in Spanish on spiritual counseling.

Isaac died on July 4, 2025, at the age of 96.
