= Edward M. Turner =

The Right Reverend Edward Mason Turner D.D.
- Bishop of the Virgin Islands
- Church: Episcopal Church
- Diocese: Virgin Islands
- Elected: November 19, 1971
- In office: 1972–1985
- Predecessor: Cedric E. Mills
- Successor: E. Don Taylor

Orders
- Ordination: July 2, 1944 by John Boyd Bentley
- Consecration: April 20, 1972 by John E. Hines

Personal details
- Born: November 13, 1918 Chicago, Illinois, United States
- Died: October 21, 1996 (aged 77) Las Vegas, Nevada, United States
- Denomination: Anglican
- Parents: Allen Bowden Turner & Frances Marjory Miller
- Spouse: Anne Josephine Pfeiler (m. May 29, 1944); Shirley Louise Dittmer (m. May 1, 1958)
- Children: 2

Edward Mason Turner (November 13, 1918 – October 21, 1996) was an American Episcopal prelate who served as the 2nd Bishop of the Virgin Islands from 1972 till 1985.

== Biography ==
Turner was born on November 13, 1918, in Chicago, Illinois, but grew up in Anchorage, Alaska. He graduated from Carroll College in Waukesha, Wisconsin, with a Bachelor of Arts. Turner attended Nashotah House to study for the priesthood. He was ordained deacon by the Bishop of Milwaukee Benjamin F. P. Ivins who acted on behalf of the Bishop of Alaska, on May 26, 1943, in St Mary the Virgin Church at Nashotah House.

After graduation he returned to Alaska and was ordained priest on July 2, 1944, by the Bishop of Alaska John Boyd Bentley in All Saints Mission in Anchorage, Alaska. After ordination he was assigned as priest-in-charge of St Peter's Mission in Seward, Alaska. In 1949 he went to New York to serve as an assistant to the Director of the Overseas Department of the National Council. In 1950 and 1951 he served as a reserve chaplain with the U.S. Navy during the Korean War. In 1953 he was made canon of St John's Cathedral in San Juan, Puerto Rico, and was rector of the English-speaking congregation. He left for the Virgin Islands in 1959 and served as rector of St Paul's Church in Frederiksted, U.S. Virgin Islands. He was elected bishop on November 19, 1971. He was consecrated in Saint Croix on April 20, 1972, by the Presiding Bishop John E. Hines and co-consecrated by Cedric E. Mills and A. Ervine Swift. He retired in 1985 and died on October 21, 1996, in Las Vegas, Nevada.
