= Diocese of Panama =

Diocese of Panama may refer to:

- Roman Catholic Archdiocese of Panamá
- Anglican Diocese of Panama
