= Martín Barahona =

El Salvadoran Anglican bishop (1943–2019)

The Most Reverend Martín Barahona
- Church: Anglican Church in Central America; Episcopal Church (before 1998)
- Diocese: El Salvador
- In office: 1992–2015
- Predecessor: James Ottley
- Successor: Juan David Alvarado

Orders
- Consecration: September 15, 1978

Personal details
- Born: 1943
- Died: March 23, 2019 (aged 76)

Martín De Jesus Barahona (1943 – March 23, 2019) was an El Salvador Anglican bishop. He served as bishop of the Diocese of El Salvador; in April 2002, he was elected primate of the Anglican Church in Central America.

A man shot at Barahona on March 17, 2010, missing Barahona but hitting his driver, Francis Martínez.

He eventually was succeeded as bishop of El Salvador by Juan David Alvarado, who took office in 2015.

Barahona died from cancer on March 23, 2019, at Hospital Divina Providencia in San Salvador.

Anglican Communion titles
Preceded by Cornelius Wilson	Archbishop of the Anglican Church in Central America; 2002–2011	Succeeded by Armando Guerra
Preceded by James Ottley	Anglican Bishop of El Salvador; 1992–2015	Succeeded by Juan David Alvarado
