= Paul Kellogg =

Paul Kellogg may refer to:

- Paul U. Kellogg (1879–1958), American journalist and social reformer
- Paul Axtell Kellogg (1910–1999), Episcopal bishop
