= Julio Murray =

Panamanian Anglican bishop

The Most Reverend Julio Murray
- Archbishop of Central America; Bishop of Panama
- Church: Episcopal Church (before 1998); Anglican Church in Central America
- Diocese: Panama
- In office: 2018–2022
- Predecessor: Sturdie Downs
- Successor: Juan David Alvarado
- Other post: Bishop of Panama (2000–2025)

Orders
- Ordination: 1990
- Consecration: August 19, 2000

Personal details
- Denomination: Anglican
- Education: American Biblical University, Costa Rica
- Alma mater: National University of Heredia

Julio Ernesto Murray is a Panamanian Anglican bishop. He was the primate of Iglesia Anglicana de la Region Central de America (IARCA), an Anglican Province and a transnational church in the Central America Region, which in turn belongs to the worldwide the Anglican Communion, from 2018 to 2022. He also served as diocesan bishop of Panama from 2000 until his retirement in November 2025. Murray studied theology in three institutions: the Latin American Biblical Seminary Costa Rica, the National University of Heredia, and the American Biblical University Costa Rica. He also attended the Bossey Institute in Switzerland.

Anglican Communion titles
Preceded by Sturdie Downs	Archbishop of the Anglican Church in Central America; 2018–2022	Succeeded by Juan David Alvarado
Preceded by Clarence W. Hayes	Anglican Bishop of Panama; 2000–2025	Succeeded by Ramón Ovalle (interim)
