= Lemuel B. Shirley =

The Right Reverend Lemuel B. Shirley
- Panama
- Church: Anglican
- Diocese: Panama

Orders
- Consecration: February 19, 1972

Lemuel Barnett Shirley (1916–1999) was the fourth bishop of Panama. At the time Shirley was bishop, Panama was a diocese in Province 9 of the Episcopal Church in the United States of America. Panama is now part of the Anglican Church in Central America.
