= David Álvarez (bishop) =

Bishop of the Diocese of Puerto Rico of the Episcopal Church of the U.S. (born 1941)

The Right Reverend David Andrés Álvarez-Velázquez
- Bishop of Puerto Rico
- Church: Episcopal Church
- Diocese: Puerto Rico
- In office: 1989–2013
- Predecessor: Francisco Reus-Froylan
- Successor: Rafael Morales
- Previous post: Coadjutor Bishop of Puerto Rico (1987-1989)

Orders
- Consecration: November 28, 1987 by James Ottley

Personal details
- Born: 17 August 1941 (age 84) Ponce, Puerto Rico
- Denomination: Anglican

David Andrés Álvarez-Velázquez (born 17 August 1941) served as bishop of the Diocese of Puerto Rico of the Episcopal Church of the United States (TEC), or "Iglesia Episcopal Puertorriqueña", succeeding the late Francisco Reus-Froylan, the first Puerto Rican to serve as diocesan bishop. He also served as acting bishop in Cuba and was also a member of the Executive Committee of the Episcopal Church of the United States.

He was elected coadjutor bishop of Puerto Rico on September 20, 1987 and was consecrated in St Theresa's Church in San Juan, Puerto Rico on November 28, 1987 by James Ottley, Bishop of Panama. He succeeded as diocesan bishop on December 3, 1989.

He retired as diocesan bishop in 2013, upon attaining the mandatory retirement age of 72. In 2014 Bishop Wilfrido Ramos-Orench was appointed Bishop Provisional of Puerto Rico until a new process is begun and completed to select Bishop Alvarez' formal successor as the VII diocesan Episcopal bishop of Puerto Rico.

Bishop Alvarez and his wife, Maryleen, live in Puerto Rico, where they are members of St. Stephen's Episcopal Church. He remains active in committees of the Episcopal Church of the United States and participated in the consecration of Peter Eaton as bishop coadjutor of the Episcopal Diocese of Southeastern Florida and of his successor as Bishop of the Episcopal Diocese of Puerto Rico Rafael Morales on July 22, 2017.

== See also ==
- List of Puerto Ricans

Episcopal Church (USA) titles
Preceded by Francisco Reus-Froylan	Diocesan Bishop of Puerto Rico; 1989-2015	Succeeded by Wilfrido Ramos-Orench (provisional 2015-2017) and Rafael Morales (Diocesan Bishop)
