= Philip Locke (priest) =

Irish priest in the Anglican Church

The Very Reverend Philip Locke
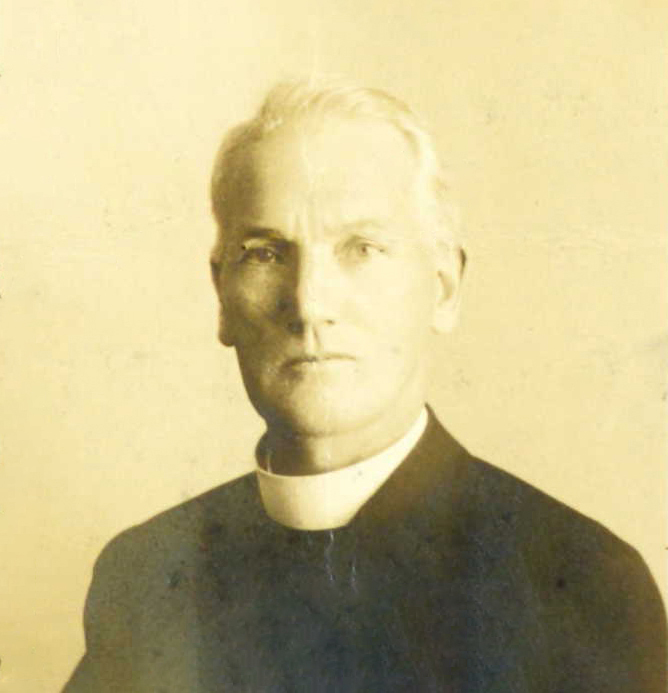
- 1933 portrait of Locke
- Born: Philip Dottin Locke; 11 March 1883; Dublin, Ireland
- Died: 19 July 1953 (aged 70); Pétion-Ville, Port-au-Prince, Haiti
- Education: Montreal Diocesan Theological College
- Spouse: Constance Locke

Philip Dottin Locke (11 March 1883 – 19 July 1953) was an Irish priest in the Anglican Church whose ministry was located predominantly in the Caribbean. He served as rector of Ponce from 1924 to 1931, San Juan from 1931 to 1939, and Santo Domingo from 1939 to 1947.

== Early life and education ==
Locke was born in Dublin, Ireland on 11 March 1883. After receiving his education in Dublin, he studied for ordination in London, where he was ordained in the Church of England. He later won a scholarship to Montreal Diocesan Theological College in Canada, where he volunteered for missionary work under the Society for the Propagation of the Gospel in 1910.

== Career ==
After spending several years with the Society for the Propagation of the Gospel, Locke resigned to accept a position as an appointee of the Board of Missions. From 1913 to 1916, he was the clergyman of All Saint's Church in Graysville, Manitoba.

In 1924, he joined the congregation of the Iglesia de la Santísima Trinidad as the Anglican rector of Ponce in Puerto Rico. There being no church building for his congregation, he organised the funding and construction of a new church building completed in 1926. He left Ponce in 1931 to take up post as rector of the Puerto Rican capital San Juan from 1931 to 1939, with a ministry located in Pinaglabanan Church.

In 1933, Locke, along with other clergy of the Anglican Communion, signed a statement to the House of Bishops expressing that he could not participate in celebrations of the Eucharist by ministers who had not had been ordained in the Anglican church. In it, the clergy also threatened to break away from the Anglican Communion if celebrations by unordained ministers were allowed to happen.

In 1939, he moved to the Dominican Republic to serve as rector of the Dominican capital Santo Domingo at the Episcopal Cathedral of the Epiphany-Union Church of Santo Domingo.

On 1 August 1947, he was appointed rector and dean of the Theological Seminary in Montrouis, Haiti, which he held until his death.

== Death ==
Locke left Port-au-Prince on 15 June 1953 for a regular three month furlough, but with health failing was forced to return on 14 July. He died on 19 July at his home in the Port-au-Prince suburb of Pétion-Ville and was buried at Holy Trinity Cathedral. He was survived by his wife Constance and two sons.
