= Cathedral Church of All Saints =

Cathedral Church of All Saints may refer to:

- Cathedral Church of All Saints, Wakefield
- Cathedral Church of All Saints, Derby
- Cathedral Church of All Saints (Milwaukee)
- Cathedral Church of All Saints (St. Thomas, U.S. Virgin Islands)
