= Wilfrido Ramos-Orench =

Puerto Rican Episcopalian bishop

The Right Reverend Wilfrido Ramos-Orench
- Provisional Bishop
- Church: Episcopal Church
- Province: Province IX
- Diocese: Puerto Rico
- Appointed: January 25, 2014
- Other posts: Suffragan Bishop in the Diocese of Connecticut (2000–2006); Provisional Bishop of the Diocese of Central Ecuador (2006–2009)

Orders
- Consecration: October 14, 2000 by Douglas E. Theuner

Personal details
- Born: May 4, 1940 (age 86) Yauco, Puerto Rico

Wilfrido Ramos-Orench (born May 4, 1940) is an Episcopal bishop. From 2014 to 2017 he served as the Provisional Bishop of the Diocese of Puerto Rico. He was a suffragan bishop in the Diocese of Connecticut from 2000 to 2006, and the provisional bishop of the Diocese of Central Ecuador from 2006 to 2009.

== Early life and education ==
Ramos was born on May 4, 1940, and is a native of Yauco, Puerto Rico. He is one of three siblings to join the priesthood and one of two to become bishops.

== Ordained ministry ==
He was consecrated on October 14, 2000 as the 960th bishop in order of consecration of the Episcopal Church of the United States and served as suffragan bishop in the Diocese of Connecticut. He was installed as Provisional Bishop in Ecuador on September 13, 2006.

On January 25, 2014, Ramos was appointed the provisional bishop of the Diocese of Puerto Rico. He continued as such until the successor of Bishop David Álvarez, who retired on October 31, 2013, as Diocesan Bishop, was selected and installed. The Episcopal Church's Presiding Bishop Katharine Jefferts-Schori presided at a special ceremony on March 28, 2014, in San Juan commemorating Bishop Ramos' new designation, with the attendance of eight other bishops. One of them, his brother José Antonio Ramos-Orench, delivered the homily. On January 25, 2014, his appointment as provisional bishop of Puerto Rico was ratified by a large majority of the Diocesan Assembly. On July 22, 2017 Rafael Luis Morales Maldonado was consecrated as successor in the see, and Bishop Ramos was appointed emeritus.

Episcopal Church (USA) titles
Preceded by David Andres Alvarez-Velazquez as Bishop of Puerto Rico	Provisional Bishop of Puerto Rico; January 25, 2014 – Present	Current holder
Preceded by Neptalí Larrea Moreno as Bishop of Central Ecuador	Provisional Bishop of Central Ecuador; 2006–2009	Succeeded by Luis Fernando Ruiz as Bishop of Central Ecuador
Preceded by Andrew Smith	Suffragan Bishop of Connecticut; October 14, 2000 – 2006; With: James E. Curry	Succeeded by James E. Curry; Laura J. Ahrens
