= Diocese of Puerto Rico =

Diocese of Puerto Rico may refer to:

- Archdiocese of San Juan de Puerto Rico (Roman Catholic)
- Episcopal Diocese of Puerto Rico (Anglican)
