= Protestantism in Puerto Rico =

Officially introduced in 1872

Protestantism in Puerto Rico officially was introduced in 1872 when the first Protestant church in the Anglican tradition was established on the island. Before the islands of Puerto Rico came under United States sovereignty in 1898, Protestantism was suppressed under Roman Catholic Spanish rule.

== History ==
In Montaña, Aguadilla, a group called "Los Bíblicos" met clandestinely under the direction of Antonio Badillo. Many freethinkers and Protestants belonged to Masonic lodges, as many in the older generation still do. In 1872, the first Protestant church was established in Puerto Rico, when Bishop William Walrond Jackson, from the Anglican Diocese of Antigua provided for the creation of the Holy Trinity Anglican Church in Ponce, followed several years later by All Saints Anglican Church in Vieques.

Soon after the change of sovereignty, United States Protestant denominations agreed to divide the island in order to facilitate missionary penetration. The two existing Anglican churches in Ponce and Vieques served as the basis for a new diocese of the Episcopal Church of the United States which has since had seven diocesan bishops. Presbyterians, Methodists, Baptists, Congregationalists and Disciples of Christ started the missionary work. While the President appointed the governors, these denominations were influential in government policies. After the 1940s this changed; nevertheless Protestantism kept growing, particularly Pentecostalism, which grew mostly among the poor and the rural.

== Institutions ==
Mainline Protestants started educational and health institutions. Presbyterians founded in 1912 the InterAmerican University, with 11 campuses and 40,000 students, and established in 1904 the Ashford Presbyterian Hospital in San Juan. Seventh-day Adventists founded Adventist University in 1961 and Bella Vista Hospital in 1954 near Mayagüez. In 1907, the Episcopal Church established St. Luke's Hospital in Ponce, the centerpiece of a multi-hospital health services organization today. An interdenominational Seminary, Seminario Evangélico de Puerto Rico was begun in 1919. There is a Council of Churches, founded by the cooperating denominations of the original community agreement.

In 1940, Juanita Garcia Peraza and her followers founded the "Mita" congregation, the only Protestant religion of Puerto Rican origin.

== Present situation ==
Estimates of the Protestant population vary greatly. The CIA World Factbook estimates that 85% of the population is Roman Catholic while the remaining 15% are Protestants and other religions. Pollster Pablo Ramos stated in 1998 that the population was 38% Roman Catholic, 28% Pentecostal, and 18% were members of independent churches, which would give a Protestant percentage of 46% if the last two populations are combined. Protestants collectively added up to almost two million people. "The conclusion is that Puerto Rico is no longer predominantly Catholic."

Another researcher gave a more conservative assessment of the proportion of Protestants: "Puerto Rico, by virtue of its long political association with the United States, is the most Protestant of Latin American countries, with a Protestant population of approximately 33 to 38 percent, the majority of whom are Pentecostal. David Stoll calculates that if we extrapolate the growth rates of evangelical churches from 1960-1985 for another twenty-five years Puerto Rico will become 75 percent evangelical." Guatemala and Honduras have similar proportions of Protestants, with Guatemala probably being the highest.

== Bibliography ==
- Cardona, José A. Breve historia de la Iglesia Presbiteriana en Puerto Rico. Río Piedras, 1976.
- Rodríguez, Daniel R. La primera evangelización norteamericana en Puerto Rico, 1898-1930. México, D.F.: Ediciones Borinquen, 1986.
- Silva Gotay, Samuel. Protestantismo y Política en Puerto Rico. San Juan: Editorial Universidad de Puerto Rico, 1997.
