= Armando Guerra =

Guatemalan Anglican bishop

The Most Reverend Armando Guerra Soria
- Archbishop of Central America; Bishop of Guatemala
- Church: Episcopal Church; Anglican Church in Central America
- Diocese: Guatemala
- In office: 2010–2015
- Predecessor: Martín Barahona
- Successor: Sturdie Downs
- Other post: Bishop of Guatemala (1982–2018)

Orders
- Ordination: 1974 (priesthood) by Anselmo Carral
- Consecration: 1982 by Lemuel B. Shirley

Personal details
- Born: 1948 or 1949 (age 76–77)
- Spouse: Norma Romero

Armando Guerra Soria is a Guatemalan Anglican bishop. He was the first native Guatemalan bishop of the Diocese of Guatemala in what was then the Episcopal Church—and later became part of the Anglican Church in Central America, or IARCA—from 1982 to 2018. From 2010 to 2015 he served as primate and archbishop of IARCA.

== Biography ==
Guerra was born in Guatemala into a poor Roman Catholic family. He qualified as a certified public accountant, married and had two children. Meanwhile, he also entered the Episcopal Seminary of Guatemala in 1971 and studied for a year at the Seminary of the Southwest. He was ordained a priest in 1974.

Guerra was made bishop of Guatemala in 1982. He was the first native Guatemalan to serve as bishop there, previous bishops having been sent as missionaries from the United States. At 32, he was also the youngest bishop in the Episcopal Church. Guerra built partnerships with U.S.-based Episcopal dioceses.

He was elected primate of IARCA in April 2010 and installed on June 12 of that year. In 2013, Guerra hosted a visit to Guatemala by Archbishop of Canterbury Justin Welby. He visited the U.S.-Mexico border in 2013 amid a sharp rise in Guatemalans crossing the border and said he hoped to communicate the dangerous conditions to his fellow Guatemalans. He stepped down as primate in 2015 and retired as diocesan bishop in 2018.

Anglican Communion titles
Preceded by Martín Barahona	Archbishop of the Anglican Church in Central America; 2010–2015	Succeeded by Sturdie Downs
Preceded by Anselmo Carral-Solar	Anglican Bishop of Guatemala; 1982–2018	Succeeded by Silvestre Romero
