= Moisés Quezada Mota =

Dominican Bishop Coadjutor

Moisés Quezada Mota (born December 3, 1956) is bishop coadjutor of the Episcopal Diocese of the Dominican Republic. He was elected on July 25, 2015 and consecrated on February 13, 2016. He was ordained to the diaconate on August 15, 1982, and to the priesthood on May 22, 1983.
