= Louis Weil =

American Episcopal priest (1935–2022)

Louis Weil (May 10, 1935 – March 9, 2022) was an American Episcopal priest, liturgical scholar, and seminary professor. He was a member of the committee that drafted and proposed the 1979 Book of Common Prayer of the Episcopal Church.

A graduate of Southern Methodist University (1956) and Harvard (MA 1958), he was ordained to the priesthood on January 1, 1962, for the Episcopal Diocese of California by the Right Reverend Joseph Harte of the Episcopal Diocese of Arizona following studies at the General Theological Seminary in New York. He completed doctoral studies on the history of the Episcopal Diocese of Connecticut at the Institut Catholique de Paris.

Weil taught at the former Episcopal Theological Seminary of the Caribbean from 1961 to 1971, Nashotah House Theological Seminary from 1971 to 1988, and the Church Divinity School of the Pacific from 1988 until his retirement in 2009. Weil also lectured at the School of Theology at The University of the South, Sewanee, Tennessee and the General Theological Seminary. He was a member of the Lutheran-Episcopal Dialogue from 1976 to 1980. Weil was a widely published author who was a member of the Latin American Theological Education Commission, Societas Liturgica, the North American Academy of Liturgy, and the Episcopal Church Standing Commission on Liturgy and Music (1985–1991). He died in Oakland, California, on March 9, 2022, at the age of 86.

== Bibliography ==
- (Donald L. Garfield, editor) Towards a Living Liturgy: The Liturgy of the Lord's Supper Examined in Essays (1969, contributor)
- La liturgia Anglicana y su adaptación en Hispanoamérica (Salamanca: Centro Ecuménico Juan XXIII, 1969)
- Worship and Sacraments in the Teaching of Samuel Johnson of Connecticut: A Study of the Sources and Development of the High Church Tradition in America, 1722–1789 (doctoral dissertation, 1972)
- Christian Initiation: A Theological and Pastoral Commentary on the Proposed Rites (Associated Parishes, 1977)
- Exsultet: The Paschal Proclamation (Nashotah, 1977)
- Objective/ecclesial View of Sacraments (Episcopal Theological Seminary of the Southwest, 1977)
- Sacraments and Liturgy, the Outward Signs: A Study in Liturgical Mentality (Blackwell, 1983) ISBN 9780631131922
- The Musical Implications of the Book of Common Prayer (Standing Liturgical Commission, 1984)
- Food for the Journey: A Study on Eucharistic Sharing (Episcopal Diocesan Ecumenical Officers, 1985)
- Gathered to Pray: Understanding Liturgical Prayer (Cowley, 1986) ISBN 9780936384351
- Worship, Pastoral Care and Community (Ecumenical Liturgical Centre, 1987)
- (editor) The Ministry of Bishops: A Study Document (Trinity Institute, 1991)
- (with Charles Price), Liturgy for Living (Morehouse, 2000) ISBN 9780819218629
- A Theology of Worship (Cowley, 2002) ISBN 9781561011940
- Liturgical Sense: The Logic of Rite (Church Publishing, 2013) ISBN 9781596272439
- Confronting Anti-Judaism in the Liturgy (2013)
- Iniciación cristiana: un comentario teológico y pastoral sobre dicho rito (no date)
