= Cristobal Olmedo Leon Lozano =

Ecuadorian Episcopal Bishop

The Right Reverend Cristóbal Olemdo León Lozano
- III Bishop of Litoral Ecuador
- Church: Episcopal Church
- Diocese: Episcopal Diocese of Litoral Ecuador
- Elected: August 4, 2018
- In office: 2019–
- Predecessor: Alfredo Terencio Morante España
- Previous post: Archdeacon of Manabí

Orders
- Ordination: 1998
- Consecration: March 30, 2019 by Michaal B. Curry
- Rank: Bishop

Cristóbal Olemdo León Lozano is the third bishop of the Episcopal Diocese of Litoral Ecuador. He was elected on August 4, 2018, to succeed Alfredo Morante España. He was consecrated by Presiding Bishop Michael Curry on March 30, 2019, at the Philanthropic Society in Guayaquil and installed the next day at Cathedral Church of Christ the King in Guayaquil.

He was ordained to the priesthood on March 22, 1998, and served as archdeacon of Manabí prior to being elected bishop.

== See also ==
- Historical list of the Episcopal bishops of the United States
