= Victor Scantlebury =

Anglican bishop in Central Ecuador (1945–2020)

The Right Reverend Victor Alfonso Scantlebury
- Church: Episcopal Church

Orders
- Consecration: March 15, 1991

Victor Alfonso Scantlebury (March 31, 1945 – December 4, 2020) was an Anglican bishop. He was an alumnus of the Episcopal Theological Seminary of the Caribbean.

A native of Colón, Panama, he was ordained in 1991 as suffragan bishop for the Anglican Church in Central America. In 1994, he was named the acting bishop of the Diocese of Mississippi in The Episcopal Church. He later served as an assistant bishop in the Episcopal Diocese of Chicago. He served as an interim bishop for the Episcopal Diocese of Central Ecuador from 2011 until his death.
