= Juan David Alvarado =

El Salvador Anglican bishop

The Most Reverend Juan David Alvarado Melgar
- Archbishop of Central America
- Church: Anglican Church in Central America
- Diocese: El Salvador
- In office: 2022–2026
- Predecessor: Julio Murray
- Successor: Ramón Ovalle
- Other post: Bishop of El Salvador (2015–present)

Juan David Alvarado Melgar is a Salvadoran Anglican bishop. He became bishop of El Salvador in 2015, succeeding Martín Barahona. In 2022, he was elected and installed to a four-year term to succeed Julio Murray as primate of the Anglican Church in Central America. He was succeeded as primate in 2026 by Bishop of Guatemala Ramón Ovalle.

Anglican Communion titles
Preceded by Julio Murray	Archbishop of the Anglican Church in Central America; 2022–2026	Succeeded by Ramón Ovalle
Preceded by Martín Barahona	Anglican Bishop of El Salvador; 2015–present	Incumbent
