= Cornelius Wilson =

Costa Rican bishop

The Most Reverend Cornelius Wilson
- Archbishop of Central America; Bishop of Costa Rica
- Church: Anglican Church in Central America; Episcopal Church (before 1977)
- Diocese: Costa Rica
- In office: 1978–2002
- Predecessor: Jose Antonio Ramos
- Successor: Hector Monterroso

Orders
- Ordination: 1965 (diaconate); 1967 (priesthood) by David E. Richards
- Consecration: September 15, 1978

Personal details
- Born: Cornelius Joshua Wilson; November 2, 1932
- Died: August 12, 2002 (aged 69)

Cornelius Joshua Wilson (November 2, 1932 – August 12, 2002) served as Anglican Bishop of Costa Rica from 1978 to 2001.

== Life ==
Born in Siquirres, Limón, on November 2, 1932, he was the fourth of eight children born to parents Eliazar Mclean and Teresa Wilson of Afro-Caribbean origin. He started primary school in Escuela Justo Facio of Siquirres and concluded it in the Escuela General Tomas Guardia School of Limon. His high school studies were in the Colegio de Limón.

Wilson married Eulalia Cole on April 19, 1952; they had five children. He studied for ordination and was ordained a deacon in 1965 and then a priest in 1967 in the Episcopal Church. He later received an M.Div. from the Interdenominational Theological Center in Atlanta.

In 1978, Wilson was elected as the third bishop―and the first native Costa Rican bishop—of the newly autonomous Diocese of Costa Rica. He was consecrated on September 15, 1978. Two decades later, in 1998, he was elected and installed as the first primate of the Anglican Church in Central America after its recognition as an autonomous province of the Anglican Communion.

== Notes ==
Anglican Communion titles
New title	Archbishop of the Anglican Church in Central America; 1998–2002	Succeeded by Martín Barahona
Preceded by Jose Antonio Ramos	Anglican Bishop of Costa Rica; 1978–2002	Succeeded by Hector Monterroso
