= Orlando Guerrero Torres =

Venezuelan Episcopal bishop

Orlando Guerrero Torres is the third and current bishop of the Episcopal Diocese of Venezuela. He was consecrated in 1995, replacing Onell Soto.
