= Tiphanie Yanique =

American writer (born 1978)

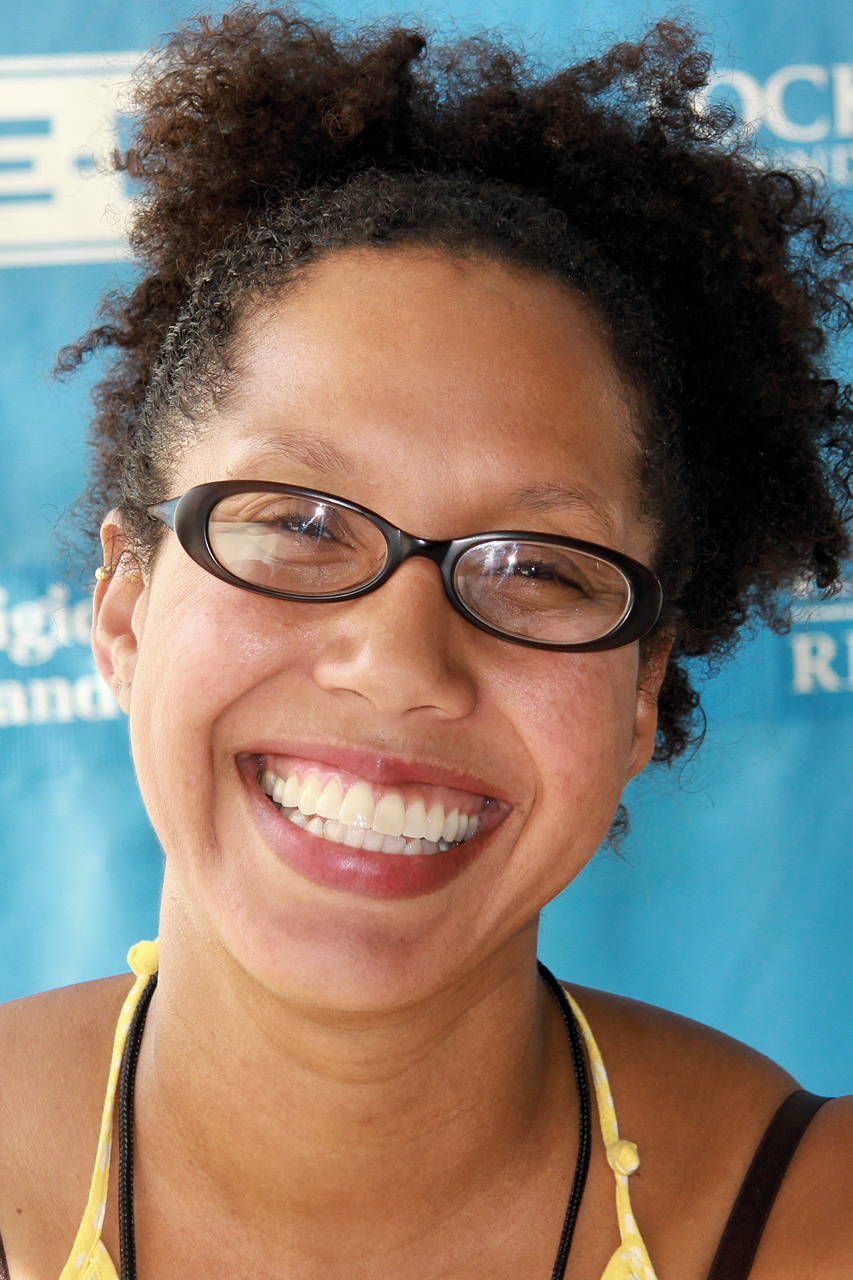
- Yanique at the 2014 Texas Book Festival
- Born: September 20, 1978 (age 47); Saint Thomas, U.S. Virgin Islands
- Education: All Saints Cathedral School; Tufts University; University of the West Indies; University of Houston
- Occupations: Fiction writer, poet and essayist
- Employer: Emory University
- Children: 3
- Writing career
- Notable awards: National Book Foundation "5 Under 35" honoree; 2011 OCM Bocas Prize for Caribbean Literature (fiction); 2014 Center for Fiction First Novel Prize; 2016 Felix Dennis Prize for Best First Collection

Tiphanie Yanique (born September 20, 1978) from Saint Thomas, U.S. Virgin Islands, is a Caribbean American fiction writer, poet and essayist who lives in New York. In 2010, the National Book Foundation named her a "5 Under 35" honoree. She also teaches creative writing, currently based at Emory University.

== Early life ==
Yanique's maternal roots are in the Virgin Islands. She is a member of the Smith (of St. Thomas and Tortola) and Galiber (of St. Thomas and St. Croix) families. Paternally, she is also a member of the Giraud family originally of Dominica. She was raised in the Hospital Ground neighborhood of St. Thomas by her grandparents, Beulah Smith Harrigan (former children's librarian of the St. Thomas Enid Baa Library and youngest child of Captain Smith of the Fancy Me) and Delvin Harrigan (former fireman and taxi dispatcher). Her biological grandfather was Dr. Andre Galiber of St. Croix.

Yanique attended Saints Peter and Paul Catholic Elementary School and graduated from All Saints Cathedral School in 1996. In 2000, she earned her undergraduate degree from Tufts University in Massachusetts. Shortly after graduating, she was awarded a Fulbright Scholarship in Literatures in English and Creative Writing at The University of the West Indies, for which she conducted research on Caribbean women writers, such as Merle Hodge and Erna Brodber in Trinidad and Tobago. Yanique went on to receive her MFA degree in creative writing in 2006 at the University of Houston, where she held a Cambor Fellowship.

== Career ==
=== Teaching ===
In 2006, after receiving her Cambor Fellowship, Yanique served as the 2006–07 Writer-in-Residence/Parks Fellow at Rice University, teaching creative writing, fiction and nonfiction, and working as the faculty editor of The Rice Review literary magazine.

From 2007 to 2011, she taught undergraduate and graduate writing and teaching courses as an assistant professor of creative writing and Caribbean literature at Drew University. During this time she also worked as an assistant editor at Narrative Magazine (2007–08), an associate editor of Post No Ills Magazine (2008–11), and the director of writing and curriculum at the Virgin Islands Summer Writers Program (2008–11).

She was an assistant professor of writing at The New School, where she taught undergraduate and graduate students, and won the 2015 Distinguished Teaching Award. She received tenure there before heading to Wesleyan University, where she was the director of the Creative Writing program. She is now associate professor at Emory University.

=== Writing ===
Yanique's debut book, How to Escape from a Leper Colony: A Novella and Stories, was published by Graywolf Press in 2010, and has received praise from journals including the Caribbean Review of Books, The Boston Globe, and O, The Oprah Magazine.

In December 2012, Yanique's children's picture book I am the Virgin Islands was published by Little Bell Caribbean/Campanita Books, and was commissioned by the First Lady of the Virgin Islands as a gift to the children of the Virgin Islands.

Her short fiction, essays and poetry have appeared in journals and anthologies including Pleiades: A Journal of New Writing, Best African American Fiction, Transition Magazine, American Short Fiction, The London Magazine, Prism International, Callaloo, Boston Review, and New Daughters of Africa.

Her first novel, Land of Love and Drowning, was published by Riverhead Books in 2014, and was described by Publishers Weekly as "an affecting narrative of the Virgin Islands that pulses with life, vitality, and a haunting evocation of place", and the reviewer for BookPage wrote: "Yanique's vivid writing, echoing Toni Morrison and Gabriel García Márquez, builds a whole world within its language and cadence. Exhilarating, fierce and effortless, Land of Love and Drowning is the imaginative tale of a family’s fight to endure."

== Awards and accolades ==
She received the Academy of American Poets Prize in 2000, and has had residencies with Bread Loaf, Callaloo, Squaw Valley and the Cropper Foundation for Caribbean Writers.

She won the 2006 Boston Review Fiction Prize for her short story "How to Escape from a Leper Colony", the 2007 Kore Press Short Fiction Award for her short story "The Saving Work", and she was also the winner of a 2008 Pushcart Prize for her short story "The Bridge Stories".

In 2011, Yanique won the Bocas Fiction Prize for Caribbean Literature with her collection How to Escape from a Leper Colony: A Novella and Stories, and the National Book Foundation named her as one of their "5 Under 35" honorees, an award that celebrates five young fiction writers selected by past National Book Award winners and finalists. She was one of three writers given the 2010 Rona Jaffe Foundation Writers' Award for fiction, along with Helen Phillips and Lori Ostlund.

She won the 2014 Center for Fiction First Novel Prize (formerly the Flaherty-Dunnan Center for Fiction Prize) for her debut novel Land of Love and Drowning, and the monthly book review publication BookPage listed her as one of the "14 Women to Watch Out for in 2014". Land of Love and Drowning also won the Phillis Wheatley Award for Pan-African Literature, and the American Academy of Arts and Letters Rosenthal Family Foundation Award, and was listed by NPR as one of the Best Books of 2014, as well as being a finalist for the Orion Award in Environmental Literature and the Hurston-Wright Legacy Award.

At the 2016 Forward Prizes for Poetry, Yanique won the Felix Dennis Prize for Best First Collection for her 2015 collection Wife, which the chair of judges Malika Booker described as: "a generous and witty book, an agile exploration of the many relationships within marriage. She has written a delightful exploration of the tensions and complexity of matrimony, in language that's deceptively simple." Yanique won the 2016 Bocas Prize in Caribbean Poetry for her collection Wife.

== Personal life ==
Yanique has three children and currently lives in Atlanta with her family.

== Bibliography ==
- How to Escape from a Leper Colony: A Novella and Stories. Graywolf Press. 2010. ISBN 978-1-55597-053-6.
- I am the Virgin Islands. Little Bell Caribbean, 2012, ISBN 9781934370308
- Land of Love and Drowning: A Novel. Penguin Group US. July 10, 2014. ISBN 978-0-698-16880-0.
- Wife, Peepal Tree Press, 2015, ISBN 9781845232948
- Monster in the Middle. Riverhead Books, 2021, ISBN 9781594633607

=== See also ===
- Caribbean literature
- Caribbean poetry
