= Cedric E. Mills =

American Episcopal bishop (1903–1992)

The Right Reverend Cedric Earl Mills D.D., LL.D.
- Bishop of the Virgin Islands
- Church: Episcopal Church
- Diocese: Virgin Islands
- Elected: 1962
- In office: 1963–1972
- Successor: Edward M. Turner

Orders
- Ordination: December 1929 by Francis M. Taitt
- Consecration: April 9, 1963 by Noble C. Powell

Personal details
- Born: December 17, 1903 Hartford, Connecticut, United States
- Died: July 3, 1992 (aged 88) San Pedro, California, United States
- Denomination: Anglican
- Parents: Patrick Henry Mills & Sophannia Blount
- Spouse: Rebecca Esther Taylor
- Children: 1

Cedric Earl Mills (December 17, 1903 - July 3, 1992) was first bishop of the Episcopal Diocese of the Virgin Islands, serving from 1963 to 1972.

== Biography ==
Mills was born in Hartford, Connecticut on December 17, 1903, the son of Patrick Henry Mills and Sophannia Blount. He graduated from Lincoln University with a Bachelor of Arts in 1926. On June 20 of the same year he married Rebecca Esther Taylor. In 1929 he received his Master of Arts from the University of Pennsylvania and his Bachelor of Sacred Theology from the Philadelphia Divinity School.

Mills was ordained deacon in May 1929 by Bishop Thomas J. Garland of Pennsylvania and priest in December of the same year by Francis M. Taitt, Coadjutor of Pennsylvania. He was immediately appointed Priest-in-charge of Ascension Chapel in West Chester, Pennsylvania, where he remained till 1937. Simultaneously he also served at St Cyril's Mission in Coatesville, Pennsylvania and St Mary's Church in Chester, Pennsylvania. He was also the Chaplain for the Episcopal students at Lincoln University, Dovington Industrial School and Cheyney State Teachers' College. Between 1935 and 1937 he was also an educator and taught science and mathematics at Dovington. In 1937 he became Priest-in-charge of St Mark's Church in Plainfield, New Jersey. He remained there till 1940 when he became rector of St James' Church in Baltimore.

In 1962, Mills was elected Missionary Bishop of the Virgin Islands by the House of Bishops. He was consecrated on April 9, 1963 by Noble C. Powell, Bishop of Maryland. He was the first Bishop in charge of the US and the British Virgin Islands after the Anglican jurisdiction of the British Virgin Islands was transferred to the Episcopal Church from the Church of England. He retired from his post in 1972 and became Assistant Bishop of Los Angeles. He died in San Pedro, California on July 3, 1992.
