= A. Ervine Swift =

Episcopalian bishop in the United States

The Right Reverend Albert Ervine Swift S.T.D.
- Bishop of Puerto Rico
- Church: Episcopal Church
- Diocese: Puerto Rico
- In office: 1951–1965
- Predecessor: Charles F. Boynton
- Successor: Francisco Reus-Froylan

Orders
- Consecration: May 3, 1951 by Henry Knox Sherrill

Personal details
- Born: July 1, 1913 Claremore, Oklahoma, United States
- Died: June 21, 2003 (aged 89)
- Denomination: Anglican
- Parents: Albert Aaron Swift & Margarette Anna Clarkson
- Spouse: Elizabeth Ann "Libby" Slusser (1915-2013)
- Children: 2

Albert Ervine Swift (July 1, 1915 - June 21, 2003) was a bishop of the Episcopal Church in the United States of America.

== Biography ==
Swift was born on July 1, 1915, in Claremore, Oklahoma, the son of Albert Aaron Swift (1886-1979) and Margarette Anna Clarkson (1888-1947). He studied at the University of Oklahoma and later at the Episcopal Divinity School. After ordination, he became assistant secretary and acting executive of the Oversees department of the National Council. Later he also served as a faculty member of the St. John's University, Shanghai. He was also assistant priest at St Hilda's Refugee Camp in the Wuchang District. In 1948 he became rector of Trinity Church in Manila in the Philippines and subsequently chaplain of St Luke's Hospital. He also served as acting dean of St Andrew's Theological Seminary in Quezon City.

In 1950 he was elected Bishop of Puerto Rico and was consecrated on May 3, 1951, with Presiding Bishop Henry Knox Sherrill as chief consecrator in Grace Episcopal Cathedral (Topeka, Kansas). He retained the post until his resignation on August 1, 1965, to give way for a native bishop to take charge. Bishop Swift assisted with the confirmations and ordinations in Puerto Rico until January 1967. He was also responsible, for a time, of the missionary district of Honduras. He also served as Assistant Bishop of Southeast Florida and rector of St Gregory's Church in Boca Raton, Florida. In 1974 he was appointed Bishop-in-Charge of the Convocation of American Churches in Europe, which post he commenced on July 1 of the same year.
