= Episcopal Theological Seminary of the Caribbean =

The Episcopal Theological Seminary of the Caribbean (ESTC) was a seminary of the American Episcopal Church in San Juan, Puerto Rico. It was founded in 1961 and dedicated by Presiding Bishop Arthur C. Lichtenberger. It closed in 1976.

== Notable faculty ==
- Louis Weil

== Notable alumni ==
- Francisco Reus-Froylan
- James Ottley
- Victor Scantlebury
