= Sturdie Downs =

Anglican bishop

The Most Reverend Sturdie Downs
- Archbishop of Central America; Bishop of Nicaragua
- Church: Anglican Church in Central America; Episcopal Church (before 1998)
- Diocese: Nicaragua
- In office: 1985–2019
- Predecessor: New title
- Successor: Harold Dixon

Orders
- Consecration: 1985 by Leonardo Romero

Personal details
- Born: 1947 (age 78–79)

Sturdie Wayman Downs (born 1947) was consecrated as an Anglican bishop on 9 February 1985. He is Bishop of Nicaragua and served from 2015 to 2019 as Archbishop of the Anglican Church in Central America (Iglesia Anglicana de la Región Central de America/IARCA).

Anglican Communion titles
Preceded by Armando Guerra	Archbishop of the Anglican Church in Central America; 2015–2018	Succeeded by Julio Murray
New title	Anglican Bishop of Nicaragua; 1985–2019	Succeeded by Harold Dixon
