= Guy Marshall =

British Anglican bishop

- Assistant Bishop of Peterborough
- Diocese: Diocese of Peterborough
- In office: 1974–1978
- Other posts: Bishop in Venezuela (1972–1974) suffragan bishop for Venezuela (1967–1972)

Orders
- Ordination: 1936 (deacon); 1937 (priest) by Arthur Winnington-Ingram
- Consecration: 1967

Personal details
- Born: 5 November 1909
- Died: 3 August 1978 (aged 68)
- Denomination: Anglican
- Parents: Edgar & Marion
- Spouse: 1. Dorothy; 2. Harriet
- Children: four
- Education: University College, Durham

Guy Marshall (5 November 1909 – 3 August 1978) was a British Anglican bishop who served as suffragan bishop for Venezuela (then in the Diocese of Trinidad and Tobago).

== Early life and education ==
Marshall was the son of Edgar Breedon Marshall and Marion (née Worsley), and was educated at Prince Henry's Grammar School, Otley and University College, Durham. He then trained for the ministry at King's College London, graduating with a Theological AKC (Associateship of King's College). He married Dorothy Gladys Whiting in 1936, and they had three sons and one daughter. Dorothy died in 1975 and Marshall remarried in 1977, to Harriet Ethel (daughter of J. J. Moore, priest).

== Ministry ==
He was ordained in the Church of England: made a deacon at Michaelmas 1936 (4 October) and ordained a priest the Michaelmas following (3 October 1937), by Arthur Winnington-Ingram, Bishop of London, at St Paul's Cathedral. He served his title (curacy) at St Andrew's, Stoke Newington until 1938, when he became an Assistant Chaplain at Missions to Seamen in Southampton.

=== Argentina ===
While based in Southampton, Marshall also served with Missions to Seamen in Buenos Aires and Rosario; in 1942, he moved to Rosario to become Chaplain to St Andrew's Seafarers' Chapel. He was made a Member of the Order of the British Empire in 1943. From 1944 until 1952, he was Rector, Canon and Sub-Dean of St John's Pro-Cathedral, Buenos Aires.

=== England and Canada ===
Returning to England, he served as Rector of Stoke Bruerne with Grafton Regis and Alderton (Diocese of Peterborough), 1953–1956. His next postings were in Canada: as Chaplain to Missions to Seamen in Toronto; and — additionally — as Rector of St Stephen's Church in the same city (from 1958).

=== Venezuela ===
In a joint initiative of the Canadian and West Indies Anglican churches, Marshall was elected in 1967 a bishop suffragan in the Diocese of Trinidad and Tobago, with responsibility for missionary activities in Venezuela. He was consecrated bishop that year, and became the first diocesan (Ordinary) Bishop in Venezuela when his area was erected into the Diocese of Venezuela in 1972.

=== Northants again ===
Marshall resigned his See in 1974, and was appointed Assistant Bishop of Peterborough and Vicar of Blakesley with Adstone. He died in post in 1978.

Anglican Communion titles
New title	Bishop in Venezuela; 1972–1974	Succeeded by Haydn Jones
