= Charles B. Colmore =

American bishop

The Right Reverend Charles B. Colmore D.D.
- Bishop of Puerto Rico
- Church: Episcopal Church
- Diocese: Puerto Rico
- In office: 1913–1947
- Predecessor: James H. Van Buren
- Successor: Charles F. Boynton

Orders
- Ordination: 1904
- Consecration: December 17, 1913 by Daniel S. Tuttle

Personal details
- Born: March 31, 1879 Victoria, Tennessee, United States
- Died: June 28, 1950 (aged 71)
- Buried: Palm Cemetery, Winter Park, Florida
- Denomination: Anglican
- Parents: Robert Lionel Colmore & Priscilla Diana Addenbrooke
- Spouse: Sarah Rogers Palmer
- Children: 6
- Education: Sewanee: The University of the South

Charles Blayney Colmore (March 31, 1879 - June 28, 1950) was second bishop of the Episcopal Diocese of Puerto Rico.

== Early life and education ==
Colmore was born on March 31, 1879, in Victoria, Tennessee, the son of Robert Lionel Colmore (1849-1922) and Priscilla Diana Addenbrooke (1852-1904). He graduated with a Bachelor of Arts from Sewanee: The University of the South in 1898. In 1900 he earned his Master of Arts and in 1903 his Bachelor of Divinity. He was awarded an honorary Doctor of Divinity in 1914.

== Ordained ministry ==
After studies at the University of the South, he was ordained deacon and priest in 1904. He served as rector of the Church of the Messiah in Pulaski, Tennessee till 1905 when he became Dean of the Cathedral of the Holy Trinity in Havana in Cuba, where he remained till 1913.

== Bishop ==
Colmore was elected Bishop of Puerto Rico in 1913 and was consecrated to the episcopate on December 17, 1913, with Presiding Bishop Daniel S. Tuttle as chief consecrator. He was also responsible for the Missionary district of the Dominican Republic for some time. He retired in 1947.

== Family ==
Colmore married Sarah Rogers Palmer (1881-1961) on November 18, 1903, and together they had six children.
