= Episcopal Diocese of Venezuela =

Anglican diocese in Venezuela

Diocese of Venezuela Diócesis de Venezuela
- Bishopric

Location
- Country: Venezuela
- Territory: Venezuela
- Ecclesiastical province: Province IX
- Headquarters: Caracas

Statistics
- Area: 916,445 km^{2} (353,841 sq mi)
- Churches: 10
- Members: 1,097 (2018)

Information
- Denomination: Episcopal Church
- Established: 1972
- Secular priests: 9

Current leadership
- Bishop: Orlando Guerrero Torres

The Episcopal Diocese of Venezuela is an Anglican diocese in Venezuela. It forms part of Province IX of the Episcopal Church. The current bishop is Orlando Guerrero Torres. The diocese became part of the Episcopal Church in August 2003.

== Bishops ==
1. Guy Marshall (1972–1974; previously suffragan bishop (of Trinidad and Tobago) for Venezuela since 1967)
2. Haydn Jones (1976-1986)
3. Onell Soto (1987-1995)
4. Orlando Guerrero Torres (1995-Present)
