= Episcopal Diocese of Litoral Ecuador =

Diocese of the Episcopal Church in Ecuador

The Episcopal Diocese of Litoral Ecuador (Spanish: Iglesia Episcopal del Ecuador - Diócesis Litoral) is a missionary church of the Anglican Communion for the coastal region of Ecuador with headquarters in Guayaquil. It forms part of Province IX of the Episcopal Church.

The third and current bishop is Cristobal Olmedo Leon Lozano.

== Bishops ==
1. Luis Caisapanta (1988–1991)
  * Martiniano García Montiel (1992–1994) (Administrator)
2. Alfredo Terencio Morante España (1994–2019)
3. Cristobal Leon Lozano (2019–Present)
