= James H. Van Buren =

Inaugural bishop of the Episcopal Diocese in Puerto Rico

The Right Reverend James Hartt Van Buren D.D.
- Bishop of Puerto Rico
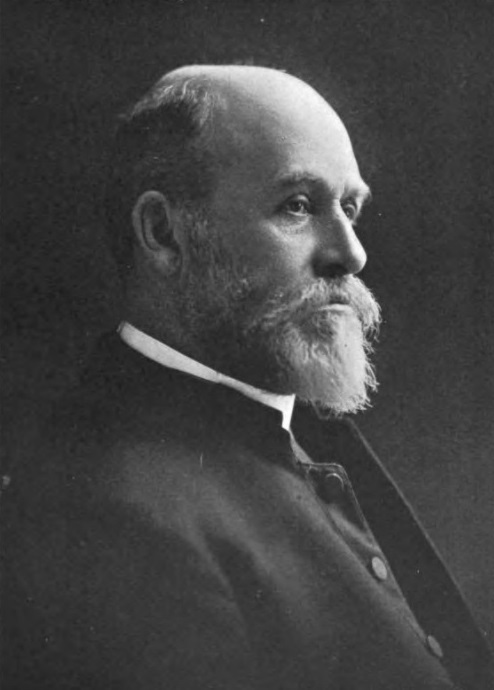
- Church: Episcopal Church
- Diocese: Puerto Rico
- In office: 1902–1913
- Successor: Charles B. Colmore

Orders
- Consecration: June 24, 1902 by George William Peterkin

Personal details
- Born: 1850 Watertown, New York, United States
- Died: 1917 (aged 66–67)
- Denomination: Anglican

James Hartt Van Buren (1850–1917) was the first bishop of the Episcopal Diocese of Puerto Rico, serving from 1902 to 1913.

== Biography ==
Van Buren was born in Watertown, New York in 1850. He studied at the Yale Divinity School from where he graduated in theology. After ordination to the priesthood he served as priest in St Peter's Church in Milford, Connecticut, Trinity Church in Seymour, Connecticut, St Paul's Church in Englewood, New Jersey and St Paul's Church in Newburyport, Massachusetts. In 1890 he became rector of St Stephen's Church in Lynn, Massachusetts. In 1902 he went to Puerto Rico as a missionary priest and was then elected Bishop of the missionary district. He was consecrated on June 24, 1902 in St Stephen's Church by the George William Peterkin of West Virginia. He remained in Puerto Rico until 1913. He died in 1917.

== Bibliography ==
- (editor and translator), Latin Hymns in English Verse, with Short Biographical Sketches of Their Authors (1904)
- Sermons That Have Helped (1908)
