= E. Don Taylor =

Jamaican-born Episcopal bishop (1937–2014)

The Right Reverend Egbert Don Taylor D.D.
- Bishop of the Virgin Islands
- Church: Episcopal Church
- Diocese: Virgin Islands
- Elected: 1986
- In office: 1987–1994
- Predecessor: Edward M. Turner
- Successor: Theodore A. Daniels
- Other post: Assistant Bishop of New York (1994-2009)

Orders
- Ordination: October 29, 1961 by Percival Gibson
- Consecration: February 24, 1987 by Edmond L. Browning

Personal details
- Born: September 2, 1937 Kingston, Colony of Jamaica, British Empire
- Died: May 24, 2014 (aged 76) Sleepy Hollow, New York, United States
- Denomination: Anglican
- Spouse: Rosalie Taylor
- Children: 1

Egbert Don Taylor (September 2, 1937 – May 24, 2014) was third bishop of the Episcopal Diocese of the Virgin Islands (1987–1994), and an assistant bishop in the Episcopal Diocese of New York (1994–2009).

== Biography ==
Born in Kingston, Jamaica, Taylor was educated at Kingston College. He studied broadcasting and went on to work for RJR Radio in Canada for 19 years, before being ordained to the diaconate and priesthood by Percival Gibson in 1961. After ordination he was appointed to St Mary the Virgin Church in Kingston, Jamaica. In 1970 he became Headmaster of Kingston College. In 1973 he left for the United States and became rector of Church of the Holy Cross in Decatur, Georgia, and served as Jamaican Honorary Consul to Atlanta. He was elected Bishop of the Virgin Islands in 1986 and was consecrated on February 24, 1987.
