= Episcopal Diocese of Central Ecuador =

Diocese of the Episcopal Church in Ecuador

The Episcopal Diocese of Central Ecuador (Spanish: Iglesia Episcopal del Ecuador - Diócesis Central) is a missionary church of the Anglican Communion for the interior region of Ecuador with headquarters in Quito. It forms part of Province IX of the Episcopal Church based in the United States. The current bishop is Juan Carlos Quiñonez Mera. He was consecrated on May 17, 2022 in the Catedra de El Senor in Quito. The Diocese participates in the General Convention of the Episcopal Church in the United States of America.

== Bishops ==
1. Adrián D. Caceres (1970–1990)
2. Neptalí Larrea Moreno (1990–2004)
3. Glauco Soarez di Lima (2004 - 2007
4. Wilfrido Ramos-Orench (2007–2009) (provisional)
5. Luis Fernando Ruiz (2009–2011)
6. Victor Scantlebury (2011–2020) (acting)
7. Juan Carlos Quiñonez (2023

–present)
