= Theodore A. Daniels =

The Right Reverend Theodore Athelbert Daniels
- Bishop of the Virgin Islands
- Church: Episcopal Church
- Diocese: Virgin Islands
- Elected: March 12, 1997
- In office: 1997–2003
- Predecessor: E. Don Taylor
- Successor: Edward Ambrose Gumbs
- Other post: Assistant Bishop of Texas (2003-2005)

Orders
- Consecration: June 30, 1997 by Walter Dennis

Personal details
- Born: 1944 (age 81–82) Ancon, Panama
- Denomination: Anglican
- Spouse: Christina
- Children: 2

Theodore Athelbert Daniels III (born 1944 in Ancon, Panama) is a Panamanian prelate who served as Bishop of the Virgin Islands from 1997 to 2003.

== Biography ==
Daniels graduated from Florida State University and the Episcopal Theological Seminary of the Caribbean in San Juan, Puerto Rico. He served as assistant of Christ Church in Colón, Panama, and St Christopher's Church in Panama City. He was also priest-in-charge of five missions. After arriving in the U.S. in 1980, he became rector of St Luke's Church in Columbia, South Carolina, while in 1986 he became rector of the Church of the Holy Redeemer in Landover Hills, Maryland. In 1992 he moved to Washington, D.C., and became rector of Calvary Church.

On March 12, 1997, Daniels was elected Bishop of the Virgin Islands and was consecrated on June 30, 1997, by Walter Dennis, Suffragan Bishop of New York. He retired in 2003, and served as Assistant Bishop of Texas until 2005.
