= Episcopal Diocese of the Dominican Republic =

Diocese of the Episcopal Church in the Dominican Republic

Coordinates: 18.4633°N 69.9027°W

Diocese of the Dominican Republic

Location
- Ecclesiastical province: Province IX

Statistics
- Congregations: 65 (2020)
- Members: 4,774

Information
- Rite: Episcopal
- Cathedral: Cathedral of the Epiphany

Current leadership
- Bishop: Moisés Quezada Mota

Map
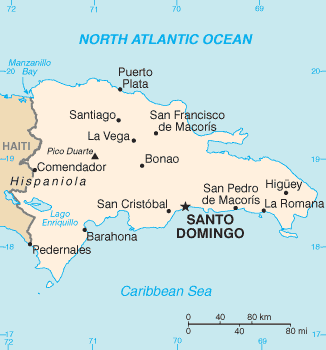
- The Diocese of the Dominican Republic includes the whole country.

Website
- www.iglepidom.org

The Episcopal Diocese of the Dominican Republic (Spanish: Iglesia Episcopal Dominicana) is the diocese of the Anglican Communion which covers all of the Dominican Republic. It is in Province IX of The Episcopal Church and includes about 60 parishes. Its cathedral is the Cathedral of the Epiphany in the see city of Santo Domingo. Moisés Quezada Mota is the current diocesan bishop.

== History ==
Benjamin Isaac Wilson, a teacher of the Christian faith, brought Anglicanism to the Dominican Republic in 1897 when he immigrated from the Virgin Islands. Wilson was ordained a priest the following year by James Theodore Holly, bishop of the Independent Haitian Episcopal Church. The American Episcopal Church began missionary work in the Dominican Republic when the country was occupied by the United States Marine Corps. William Wyllie, who arrived in 1918, and Archibald Beer, who arrived in 1920, were the first missionaries. The bishops of Puerto Rico and Haiti supervised the mission territory from 1918 to 1960. The Missionary District of the Dominican Republic was established by the General Convention in 1940. Paul Axtell Kellogg became the first resident Bishop of the Dominican Republic in 1960. The Dominican Republic became a missionary diocese in 1970, and it became the Diocese of the Dominican Republic on January 1, 1986.

== Bishops ==
1. Paul Axtell Kellogg (1960–1972)
2. Telésforo Isaac (1972–1991)
3. Julio César Holguín (1991–2017)
4. Moisés Quezada Mota (2017–Present)

== Companion Dioceses ==
The Diocese of the Dominican Republic maintains companion diocese relationships with several Episcopal dioceses in the United States:

- Central Gulf Coast
- East Carolina
- Eastern Michigan
- Georgia
- Michigan
- Nebraska
- Northwest Texas
- South Carolina
- Southeast Florida
- Southwest Florida
- Western Louisiana
- Western Michigan
