= Rafael Morales (bishop) =

Puerto Rican Episcopalian bishop

The Right Reverend Rafael Morales
- Bishop of Puerto Rico
- Native name: Rafael Morales Maldonado
- Church: Episcopal Church
- Province: Province 2 of the Episcopal Church
- Diocese: Puerto Rico
- See: Episcopal Cathedral of St. John the Baptist (San Juan, Puerto Rico)
- In office: 2017–present
- Predecessor: David Álvarez
- Other posts: Former Provisional Bishop of Cuba and Bishop Advisor of the Virgin Islands
- Previous posts: School Principal, Teacher, Vicar.

Orders
- Consecration: July 22, 2017 by Presiding Bishop Michael Curry, Bishop Wilfrido Ramos Orench (ret.), Bishop David Alvarez (ret.), Bishop Julio Holguin, Bishop Peter Eaton

Personal details
- Denomination: Anglican, formerly Roman Catholic
- Residence: Toa Alta

Rafael Luis Morales Maldonado is the seventh Bishop of Puerto Rico in The Episcopal Church.

== Biography ==
He was born in Toa Alta, Puerto Rico into the Roman Catholic Church, then Catholic Deacon Morales was received by Bishop David Andrés Alvarez-Velázquez into the Anglican faith, which would allow him, a married man, to be ordained into the priesthood.

Prior to being consecrated as a bishop, Morales' roles included serving as a parish priest in Toa Baja, a suburb of Puerto Rico's capital city of San Juan, and as head of the Episcopal Cathedral School.

He was chosen on December 10, 2016 among four candidates, including a female priest, by the Diocesan Assembly to succeed David Alvarez as the Diocesan Bishop and take over the reins of the church from Bishop Wilfrido Ramos-Orench, who served as provisional diocesan bishop for approximately 3 years after Alvarez' retirement upon reaching the mandatory retirement age of 72.

Bishop Morales served as Bishop advisor to the Episcopal Diocese of the Virgin Islands until 2026 and was also the provisional bishop for the Episcopal Diocese of Cuba until 2025.

== See also ==
- List of Episcopal bishops of the United States
- Historical list of the Episcopal bishops of the United States

Episcopal Church (USA) titles
Preceded by David Andrés Alvarez-Velázquez and Wilfrido Ramos-Orench (provisional 2015-2017)	Diocesan Bishop of Puerto Rico; 2017-present	Succeeded by Incumbent
