= Cathedral Church of All Saints (St. Thomas, U.S. Virgin Islands) =

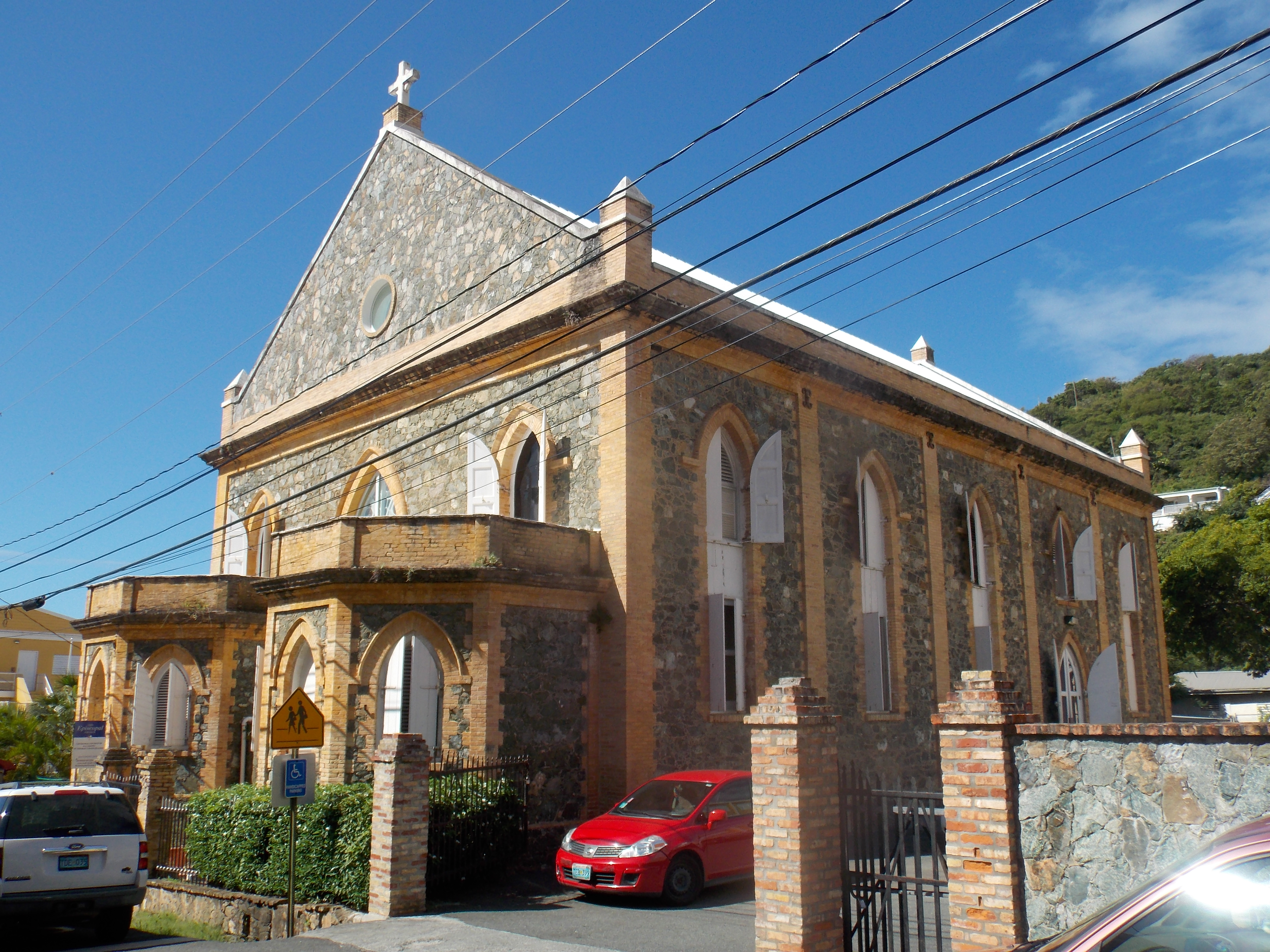
- Cathedral Church of All Saints
- 18°20′42.01″N 64°55′53.25″W
- Location: 3 Domini Gade; Charlotte Amalie, United States Virgin Islands
- Country: United States
- Denomination: Episcopal Church in the United States of America

History
- Status: Cathedral/Parish

Architecture
- Style: Gothic Revival
- Completed: 1848

Administration
- Diocese: Virgin Islands

Clergy
- Bishop: Rt. Rev. E. Ambrose Gumbs
- Dean: Very Rev. Sandye A. Wilson

The Cathedral Church of All Saints is an Episcopal cathedral in St. Thomas, U.S. Virgin Islands, United States. It is the seat of the Diocese of the Virgin Islands and it is located in the City of Charlotte Amalie. The church was built in 1848 in celebration of the end of slavery. The structure was constructed from stone that was quarried on the island. The gothic arched window frames are lined with yellow brick that was used as ballast aboard ships. The bricks were left by merchants on the waterfront to make room on their boats for molasses, sugar, mahogany and rum for their return voyage.

== See also ==
- List of the Episcopal cathedrals of the United States
- List of cathedrals in the United States
- All Saints Cathedral School
