= Edward Ambrose Gumbs =

The Right Reverend Edward Ambrose Gumbs
- Bishop of the Virgin Islands
- Church: Episcopal Church
- Diocese: Virgin Islands
- Elected: January 29, 2005
- In office: 2005–2022
- Predecessor: Theodore A. Daniels
- Successor: Rafael Morales as Bishop Advisor
- Previous post: Parish Priest

Orders
- Ordination: June 14, 1987 (deacon); June 12, 1988 (priest)
- Consecration: 11 June 2005 by Arthur Benjamin Williams, Jr.

Personal details
- Born: Anguilla
- Denomination: Anglican
- Parents: Edward Alfonso Gumbs & Drucilla Cynthia Hodge
- Spouse: Phillis Hodge
- Children: 2

Edward Ambrose Gumbs is the fifth bishop of the Episcopal Diocese of the Virgin Islands.

== Biography ==
Gumbs was born on the island of Anguilla to Edward Alfonso Gumbs and Drucilla (Cynthia) Hodge. In the late 1960’s, he migrated to St. Thomas, US Virgin Islands. He served in the US Navy from 1977 to 1981. After his tour of duty, he attended the College of the Virgin Islands, earning a Bachelor of Arts in Social Sciences in 1984.

After studies at Virginia Theological Seminary, he was ordained to the diaconate on June 14, 1987, and to the priesthood on June 12, 1988. His ministry as a priest was primarily at St. Andrew's Episcopal Church. He was consecrated as a bishop on June 11, 2005.

He is married to Phillis Hodge and they are the parents of two daughters.

== See also ==
- List of Episcopal bishops of the United States
- Historical list of the Episcopal bishops of the United States
