= Episcopal Diocese of Puerto Rico =

Anglican diocese in Puerto Rico

Episcopal Diocese of Puerto Rico Dioecesis Portoricensis Iglesia Episcopal, Diócesis de Puerto Rico
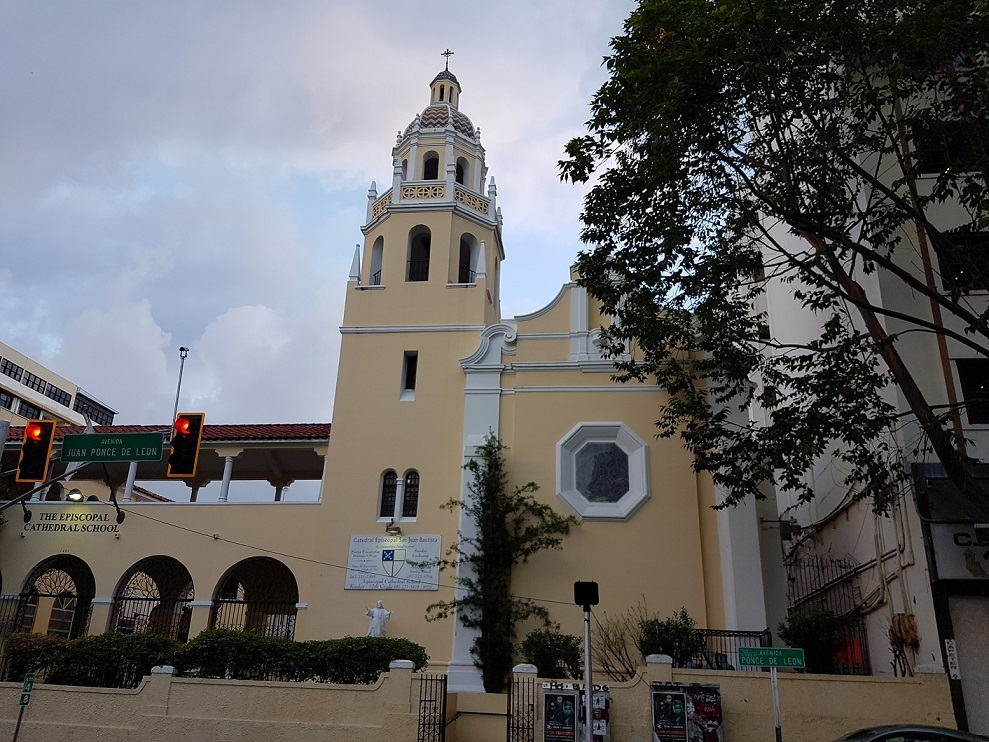
- Episcopal Cathedral of St. John the Baptist

- Coat of arms

Location
- Country: United States
- Territory: Puerto Rico
- Ecclesiastical province: Province II
- Headquarters: Santurce

Statistics
- Congregations: 57 (2024)
- Schools: 2
- Members: 3,199 (2023)

Information
- Denomination: Episcopal Church
- Rite: Anglican
- Established: 1872 by the Diocese of Antigua and the Leeward Islands, Church of England
- Cathedral: Cathedral of St. John the Baptist
- Patron saint: Our Lady of Divine Providence & Saint John the Baptist, also Our Lady of Walsingham and St Dominic.
- Secular priests: 50
- Language: Spanish, English

Current leadership
- Bishop: Rafael Morales
- Vicar General: Rev. Amelia Cintrón, Canon to the Ordinary
- Bishops emeritus: David Andres Alvarez, Wilfrido Ramos-Orench

Map
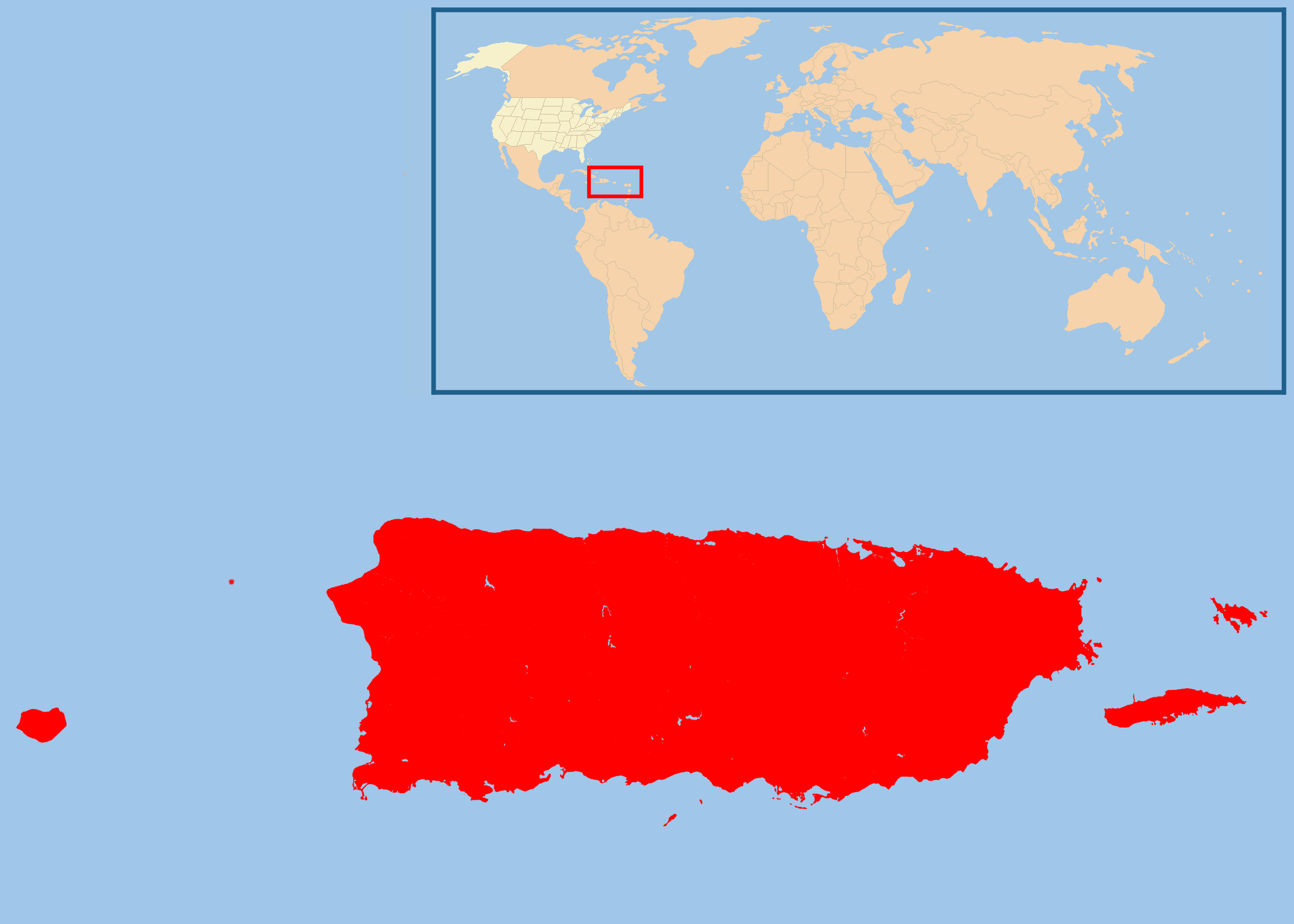

Website
- www.episcopalpr.org

The Episcopal Church Diocese of Puerto Rico (Spanish: Iglesia Episcopal, Diocesis de Puerto Rico) is a diocese of the Episcopal Church in Puerto Rico. In 2024, the diocese reported average Sunday attendance (ASA) of 1,683 persons, a relative decrease from 2,391 in 2015. Between 2015 and 2023, reported membership declined from 5,050 to 3,199. No membership statistics were reported in 2024 denominational parochial reports.

== History ==
Under Spanish rule, Puerto Rico was part of a Roman Catholic-affiliated monarchical Spanish government for over 400 years. Towards the end of that period, in the late 1870s, the Spanish government in Puerto Rico, at the behest of the Anglican bishop of Antigua, allowed the construction of the first Protestant church in Puerto Rico, the Anglican Holy Trinity Church in Ponce. This church was established to meet the spiritual needs of British merchant seamen calling at the port of Ponce. Severe restrictions were imposed on the church, such as not using its front door nor ringing the church bell which the British monarch, Queen Victoria provided each Anglican Church, so as to not attract local residents to the congregation. The second Protestant temple in Puerto Rico was established by the Anglican church in the village of Isabel Segunda on the island of Vieques.

The United States military forces that disembarked in the Guánica sector (then a part of the municipality of Yauco) in July, 1898, marched through Ponce during their long march to San Juan. While there, rang for the first time Holy Trinity's church bell. Since then, it has been known as the "Religious Freedom Bell", commemorating the fact that the First Amendment right to full religious freedom arrived in Puerto Rico in 1898.

Under United States rule, Protestantism flourished in Puerto Rico and the two Anglican congregations in Ponce and Vieques were transformed into the Episcopal Diocese of Puerto Rico with over 50 churches, three schools and multiple health facilities throughout two of the three inhabited islands of Puerto Rico.

Until 1987, Episcopalians in Puerto Rico were ruled by five successive diocesan bishops selected by the United States–based Episcopal Church, the last of which was a native-born Puerto Rican, the Rt. Rev. Francisco Reus-Froylan. In 1987, the diocese's assembly was allowed to elect retiring bishop Reus-Froylan's successor, resulting in the election of the Rt. Rev. David Alvarez as Puerto Rico's first elected Episcopal Bishop.

Under Bishop Reus-Froylan, the Episcopal Diocese of Puerto Rico separated from the Episcopal Church in the USA in 1978 but was reinstated in 2002 under Bishop Alvarez, and became part of Province IX.

In 2017 Bishop Rafael Morales succeeded bishop Wilfrido Ramos-Orench who served as provisional bishop of the diocese after David Andres Alvarez-Velazquez retired on 31 October 2013.

Subsequently, on December 10, 2016, the Diocesan Assembly, after considering four candidates, including a female member of the clergy, elected the Rev. Canon Rafael Morales to serve as the VII Bishop of the Diocese of Puerto Rico. Presiding Bishop Michael Curry as well as four other bishops, David Alvarez, Wilfrido Ramos-Orench, the then recently consecrated bishop of South Florida and a nephew of Bishop Reus-Froylan, the Rt. Rev. Peter Eaton, and the retiring bishop of the Dominican Republic consecrated Morales on July 22, 2017, at a service held at the Pedro Rosselló Convention Center in San Juan. The next day, in a service at the Catedral de San Juan Bautista he was enthroned by the Rev. Canon Dr. Mario H. Rodríguez.

The 80th General Convention of the Episcopal Church voted Yes on whether the Diocese of Puerto Rico should move from Province IX to Province II. The Diocese of Puerto Rico used to be in Province IX, which comprises seven Episcopal dioceses in Latin America and the Caribbean including Colombia, Dominican Republic, Central Ecuador, Litoral Ecuador, Honduras, and Venezuela. Province II of The Episcopal Church consists of the dioceses in the states of New York and New Jersey, Haiti, Cuba, the Virgin Islands and the Convocation of Episcopal Churches in Europe and since 2022 the Diocese of Puerto Rico.

Congregations in the diocese vary from conservative to moderate liberal and from low church to high church, but the diocese itself is generally considered moderate and is mostly supportive of the Episcopal Church and is one of its most relatively conservative dioceses, the diocese lacks LGBTQ groups like most mainland diocese and shares usual local social dialog with Roman Catholics and ministry with the Evangelical Lutheran Church in America Caribbean Synod. It shares strong ties with Colombia, Venezuela, Cuba, Ecuador, Panama, Virgin Islands and New York's respective Episcopal dioceses.

The diocese is home to the motherhouse of the House of Initia Nova, a Benedictine community in the Anglican Communion. The House of Initia Nova has vowed members, conversi, and oblates all over the United States including Puerto Rico, and in the United Kingdom, Cuba, Australia, and China. There are also local Franciscan (Orden Franciscana Diocesana) and Dominican (Anglican Order of Preachers) communities that have seen growth within the diocese for the last decade.

== Bishops ==
1. James H. Van Buren, 1902–1913
2. Charles B. Colmore, 1913–1947
3. Charles F. Boynton, 1947–1951
4. Albert Ervine Swift, 1951–1965
5. Francisco Reus-Froylan, 1965–1989
6. David Álvarez, 1989–2013
  Wilfrido Ramos-Orench (Provisional Bishop) (2014–2017)
7. Rafael Morales, since 2017
