= James Ottley =

Panamanian bishop

The Right Reverend James "Jim" Ottley
- The Episcopal Diocese of Long Island
- Church: Anglican

Orders
- Consecration: June 24, 1984

Personal details
- Born: Panama

James Hamilton "Jim" Ottley is a Panamanian bishop in The Episcopal Church.

== Life ==
Ottley was born in Colon, Panama. He received his bachelor's and master's degrees from the Episcopal Theological Seminary of the Caribbean, in Puerto Rico, and was ordained to the priesthood in 1964. He returned to Panama as a priest and on January 21, 1984, was consecrated bishop and was the fifth bishop of the Episcopal Diocese of Panama until 1995.

Bishop Ottley has a master's degree in science with a specialization in clinical psychology. He has three Doctorate Degrees Honoris Causa from the Theological Seminary of the Southwest, Austin, TX, The University of the South and Berkeley Divinity School at Yale. He has co-authored many books and wrote First Time You Say hello! Next Time We Will Be Friends.

He served simultaneously as bishop of the Anglican Diocese of El Salvador from 1985-1992. At the time Ottley was the bishop, Panama was a diocese in Province 9 of the Episcopal Church in the United States of America. Panama is part of the Anglican Church in Central America. He was subsequently appointed Anglican Observer at the United Nations by the Anglican Consultative Council and the Archbishop of Canterbury. In 2000, he became interim bishop of the Diocese of Honduras, serving until the consecration of Lloyd Allen. He also served as Interim Bishop of the Diocese of Cuernavaca of the Anglican Church of Mexico.

Until the end of May 2007, Ottley was the assistant bishop of the Episcopal Diocese of Southeast Florida. In June of that year he became the assistant bishop of Long Island. He has a wife and 4 children and 8 grandchildren.
