= Episcopal Cathedral of the Epiphany-Union Church of Santo Domingo =

Cathedral of the Epiphany Catedral Episcopal de la Epifanía
- Location within the Dominican Republic
- 18°27′47.74″N 69°54′9.86″W
- Location: Av. Independencia #253, Gazcue, Santo Domingo
- Country: Dominican Republic
- Denomination: Anglican
- Website: www.epiphany-union.com

Architecture
- Completed: 1930

Administration
- Diocese: Dominican Republic

Clergy
- Bishop: Rt. Rev. Moisés Quezada Mota
- Dean: Rev. Bladimir Pedraza

The Cathedral of the Epiphany-Union Church of Santo Domingo (Spanish: Catedral Episcopal de la Epifanía-Union Church de Santo Domingo) is a Protestant church located in Santo Domingo, Dominican Republic. It is both the seat of the Episcopal Diocese of the Dominican Republic and the home of an Interdenominational church.

== History ==
The first Anglican church in the Dominican Republic was Holy Trinity, which was established in San Pedro de Macorís in 1897. The present church building was completed in 1930 and largely destroyed by Hurricane San Zenón before it could be used. Insurance money was used to rebuild the structure. The Episcopal Church was diminished in the Dominican Republic during the dictatorship of Rafael Trujillo. Epiphany's vicar, the Rev. Charles Raymond Barnes, was murdered for describing in letters the massacre of Haitians at the border.

The charter of the Community Church of Santo Domingo is signed on May 22, 1955. They met in the chapel of the International Hospital under the pastoral care of the Rev. Maurice Daily. There was an attempt at the time to work with Epiphany. By the early 1960s the English speaking community in Santo Domingo continued to decrease in numbers and the Community Church was no longer self-supporting. The decision was made in 1968 for the Community Church to share the Epiphany Church building and its vicar, but to hold separate worship services.

The Dominican Republic became a missionary diocese in the Episcopal Church in 1970. The Rt. Rev. Telésforo Isaac becomes the first Dominican bishop of the Dominican Episcopal diocese in 1972. In 1974 the English speaking congregations are joined, and each congregation's services are held on alternating Sundays. Spanish language Episcopal services were restarted the same year. Four years later in 1978 the Community Church is renamed the Union Church of Santo Domingo, as it is a more common name used in interdenominational churches associated with the National Council of Churches in the United States.
