= Ramón Ovalle =

Guatemalan Anglican bishop

The Most Reverend Ramón Ovalle Leiva
- Archbishop of Central America
- Church: Anglican Church in Central America
- Diocese: Guatemala
- In office: 2026–present
- Predecessor: Juan David Alvarado
- Other posts: Bishop of Guatemala (2024–present); Secretary general of IARCA (2019–2026)

Orders
- Ordination: 2008 (diaconate); 2009 (priesthood)
- Consecration: 24 November 2024 by Juan David Alvarado

Ramón Ovalle Leiva is a Guatemalan Anglican bishop. He has been diocesan bishop of Guatamala in the Anglican Church in Central America (IARCA) since 2024, and since 2026 he has been primate and archbishop of IARCA.

== Biography ==
Ovalle was ordained to the diaconate in 2008 and the priesthood in 2009. He was named secretary general of IARCA in 2019. Ovalle was consecrated and installed as bishop of Guatemala at the Catedral Episcopal Santiago Apóstol on 24 November 2024. In April 2026, Ovalle was elected to succeed Juan David Alvarado for a four-year term as primate of IARCA. Ovalle was installed as primate on August 29, 2026, at the Catedral Episcopal Santiago Apóstol in Guatemala City.

Anglican Communion titles
Preceded by Juan David Alvarado	Archbishop of the Anglican Church in Central America; 2026–present	Incumbent
Preceded by Silvestre Romero	Anglican Bishop of Guatemala; 2024–present	Incumbent
