= Charles F. Boynton =

American bishop (1906–1999)

The Right Reverend Charles F. Boynton D.D.
- Church: Anglican Catholic Church; Previously Episcopal Church
- Previous posts: Coadjutor Bishop of Puerto Rico (1944-1947); Bishop of Puerto Rico (1947-1951); Suffragan Bishop of New York (1951-1969)

Orders
- Ordination: 1933
- Consecration: January 2, 1944 by Charles B. Colmore

Personal details
- Born: April 19, 1906 Geneseo, New York, United States
- Died: July 3, 1999 (aged 93) Spartanburg, South Carolina, United States
- Denomination: Anglican
- Spouse: Helen Beecher Fowler, Dori Watson
- Children: 2 by first wife

Charles Francis Boynton (April 19, 1906 – July 3, 1999) was bishop of the Episcopal Diocese of Puerto Rico, serving from 1947 to 1951. He served later as a suffragan bishop of the Episcopal Diocese of New York from 1951 to 1969. In 1990 he joined the Anglican Catholic Church.

== Biography ==
Boynton was born on April 19, 1906, in Geneseo, New York. the son of the Reverend Charles Homer Boynton and Frances Cogswell Boynton. He studied at the Williams College from where he graduated with a Bachelor of Arts. Later he received a Bachelor of Sacred Theology from the General Theological Seminary.

He was ordained deacon in 1932 and priest in 1933. He served on the faculty of Christ School in Arden, North Carolina. In 1939 he became chaplain at St Francis House at the University of Wisconsin, while in 1941 he was appointed priest-in-charge of St Andrew's Church in Mayagüez, Puerto Rico, where he remained till 1943.

In October 1943 he was elected Coadjutor Bishop of Puerto Rico and was consecrated on January 2, 1944, with Charles B. Colmore as chief consecrator in St John's Cathedral. He succeeded as diocesan bishop in 1947.

In 1951 he was elected Suffragan Bishop of New York, a post he retained till his resignation in 1969. He was noted for his ability as a jazz pianist. In 1978 he resigned his episcopacy from the Episcopal Church. He joined the conservative and breakaway Anglican Catholic Church in 1990. He died on July 3, 1999. He was married to Helen Beecher Fowler. They had two children, Carol Boynton and Frederick Boynton. After the death of his first wife, he married Dori Watson.
