= All Saints Cathedral School =

Coordinates: 18°20′42″N 64°55′53″W

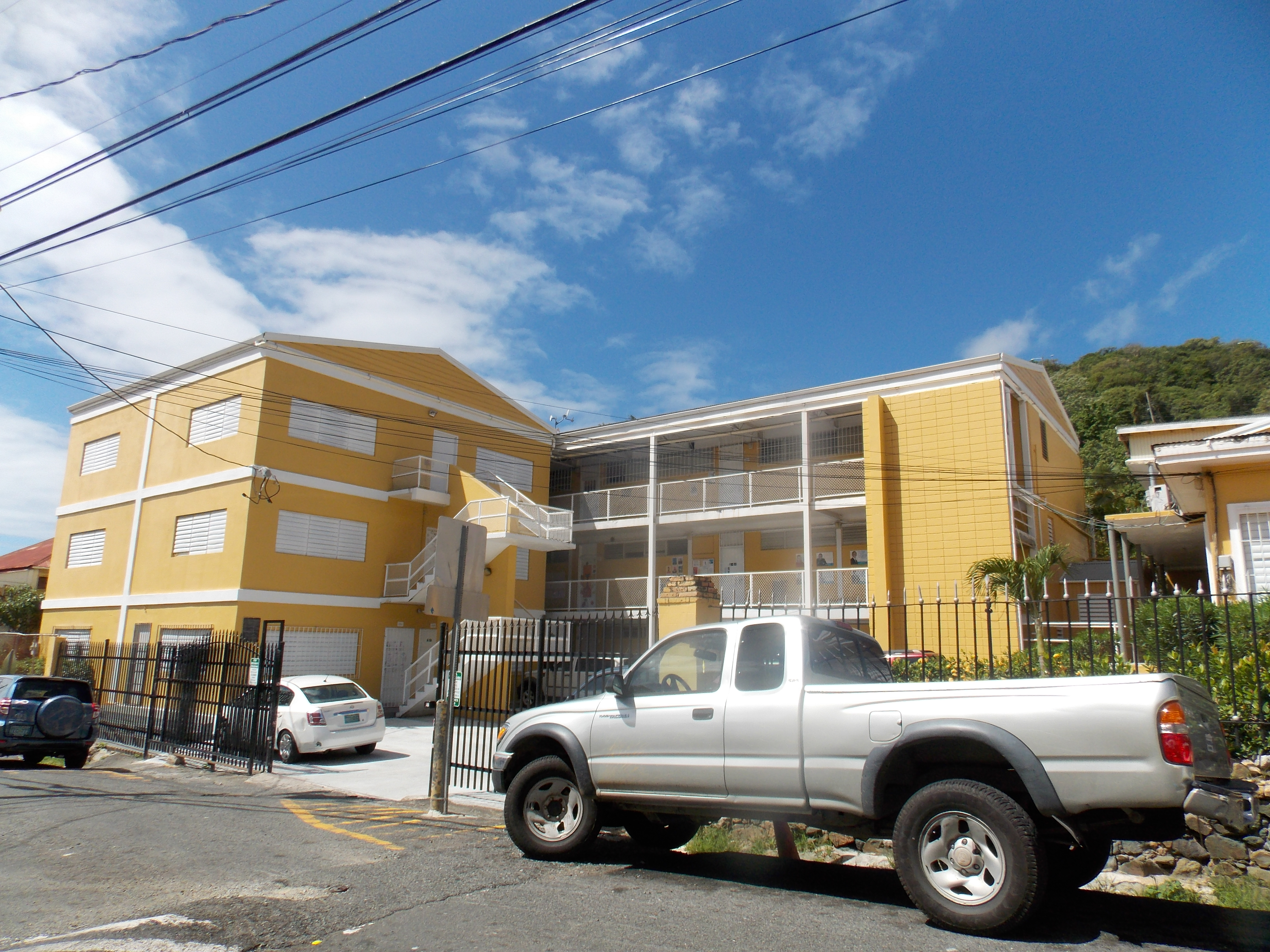

Location
- 2353 Commandant Gade 12; St. Thomas, United States Virgin Islands; United States

Information
- Type: College Preparatory
- Established: 1928 (98 years ago)
- School district: St. Thomas-St. John School District
- CEEB code: 550040
- Principal: Carla Sarauw
- Grades: Jr. K - 12
- Enrollment: Approx. 300
- Mascot: Viking
- Website: www.allsaintsvi.org

The All Saints Cathedral School, founded in 1928, is a private Episcopal college preparatory day school located on the island of St. Thomas in the United States Virgin Islands on Commandant Gade, or Garden Street. It serves students from all over the island.

== Student body ==
All Saints Cathedral School enrolls nearly 300 boys and girls in Junior Kindergarten through Grade 12, divided fairly evenly between boys and girls. The ethnic makeup is highly diverse. The number of students at each grade level is normally between 20 and 30; each grade with more than 25-30 students (as of 2025) is divided into A and B sections. The enrollment is stable since there is no room for expansion of the physical facilities. Students walk to school or come by car. The school year begins in early September and ends in early June. Classes are held five days a week from 8:15 A.M. to 3:10 P.M., and the School is insistent on punctuality at all grade levels. Ninety-five percent of the graduates go on to higher education, and over the years, several students have qualified as Presidential Scholars and National Merit Finalists.

== Student activities ==
Students from All Saints Cathedral School acquit themselves well in a variety of interscholastic competitions. All Saints teams have been champions in Virgin Islands Territorial Quiz Bowl and Science Bowl. In 2003, All Saints ninth graders won the first ever Virgin Islands History, Geography, Civics and Juvenile Rights Bowl. They have also been leaders in the Moot Court competition for some time. All Saints students also compete in Virgin Island competitions such as Carnival King and Queen and Starfest. Younger students also compete in the Spelling Bee, Math Counts and the JV Quiz Bowl. Other organized activities include Student Council, National Honor Society, Spanish Clubs, Agriculture Club, and varsity and junior varsity cheerleaders. School teams compete in flag football, baseball, soccer, boys' and girls' volleyball they are involved in basketball, and girls' softball. Parents are welcome to attend student performances and are encouraged to join in School activities through the Parent Teacher Student Association.

== Campus ==
The school is located on Commandant Gade where the Cathedral Church of All Saints stands boldly in the midst of the academic buildings. The facilities are compact and fully utilized. A cafeteria provides hot lunches; students may also bring their lunches from home.

== Academic program and courses ==
The school year begins in early September and ends in early June. Classes are held five days a week from 8:15 A.M. to 3:10 P.M. The courses offered in the high school include:

Mathematics: Pre-Algebra, Algebra I & II, Pre-Calculus, Geometry,

English & Grammar: English 9 through 12 (includes Honors courses), AP English, Grammar 9, Writing Tech I & II

History: Caribbean History, U.S. History, World History

Sciences: Physical Science, Physics, Chemistry, Biology, Advanced Biology, Human Physiology

Languages: Spanish I - III

Electives: Music, Art, Gym & Health, Computer Science I & II, Graphic Arts, Psychology, Speech, Government, Economics, Speech/ Public Speaking

== Notable people ==
- Marcella Nunez-Smith, (class of 1992), C.N.H Long Professor of medicine and epidemiology at the Yale School of Medicine
- Tiphanie Yanique (class of 1996), Pushcart Prize-winning author, poet
- Tobias S. Buckell (class of 1996), NYT Bestselling author
- Jelani Nelson (class of 2001), Professor and Former Department Chair of Electrical Engineering and Computer Sciences at the University of California, Berkeley

== School uniforms ==
Students are required to wear school uniforms consisting of a white shirt/blouse, and forest green trousers (for boys only) and a green plaid or solid forest green skirt. Students are allowed to only wear all brown or all black shoes. Seniors are to wear green ties or green plaid ties (girls only).
