= Iglesia de la Santísima Trinidad =

Historic church in Ponce, Puerto Rico

- U.S. National Register of Historic Places
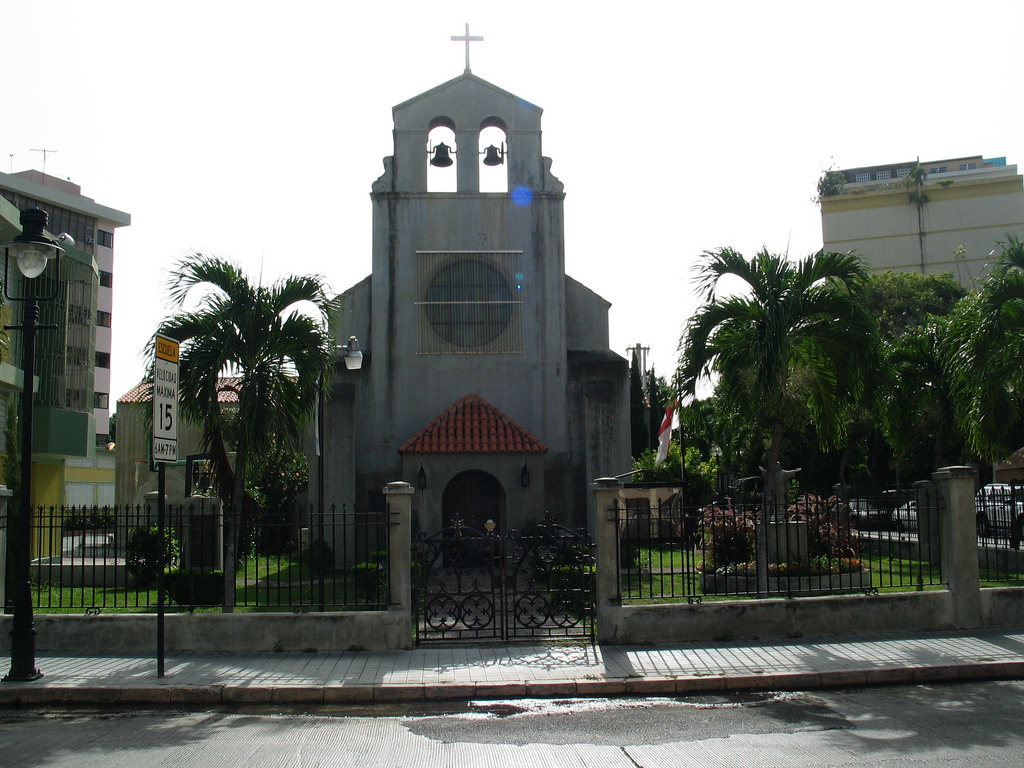
- Iglesia de la Santísima Trinidad In Barrio Cuarto in August 2010

- Location within Puerto Rico
- Location: Intersection of Marina, Mayor, and Abolicion streets, Ponce, Puerto Rico
- Coordinates: 18°00′25″N 66°36′46″W
- Built: 1873
- Architectural style: Late Gothic Revival, Mission/Spanish Revival church from a Bungalow/Craftsman, Neo Gothic
- NRHP reference No.: 86002766
- Added to NRHP: 29 September 1986

The Iglesia de la Santísima Trinidad (Holy Trinity Church) was organized by British residents in Ponce, Puerto Rico, as an Anglican congregation in 1869. They built their first church of wood and metal at this site in 1873, aided by materials sent by Queen Victoria's government, including a bell cast in England in 1870. Located at the intersection of Marina, Mayor, and Abolicion streets, it was the first Anglican church built on the island. Holy Trinity was still the only Protestant church in Puerto Rico at the time of the United States invasion in 1898.

Because the old church had deteriorated, it was taken down; and a new church building was constructed on the same site in 1926 under supervision from the Rev. Philip Locke. It has a synthesis of English neo-Gothic and Spanish-colonial styles. The 1870 bell was installed in the new church. The architect or designer is unknown. The church was listed on the U.S. National Register of Historic Places on 29 September 1986.

== Physical appearance ==
Most Holy Trinity Episcopal Church
- Most Holy Trinity-aided Parish
- Trinity Church Ponce, Iglesia de la Trinidad de Ponce, La Trinidad, The Trinity
- Parroquia Ayudada Santisima Trinidad
- Most Holy Trinity Episcopal Church
- Language(s): Spanish & English
- Denomination: Anglicanism
- Tradition: Broad church to Low church

History
- Founder: Queen Victoria by request of local Englishmen

Administration
- Province: Province II of the Episcopal Church
- Diocese: Puerto Rico Episcopal Diocese

Clergy
- Rector: Francisco J. Morales Colon

The Holy Trinity Church (1926) is a free-standing structure located on the east side of "calle Marina" at the intersection of "calle Mayor" and "calle Abolición", a public area formed by the merging of "calle Marina" and "calle Mayor".

The building follows the typical cruciform plan, created by a double-height nave with a crossing situated just west of the semi-circular apse. The nave incorporates an interior balcony addition above the main entrance. Concrete pilaster masses along the side walls support a concrete plate which, in turn, supports the wooden king trusses of the exposed roof construction. The side walls are divided into five bays of equal width by the pilaster masses. Bays 1 through 4 are punctured by attenuated, circular-arch, glazed windows of Gothic proportions, and the transept is located at bay 5. All interior walls are free of ornamentation.

The exterior is characterized by the combined use of neo-Gothic and Spanish-Colonial elements. The body of the church is buttressed between the window opening along the north and south facades. The transept rises only one story in height and its gables are oriented along a north–south axis. The exterior walls are void of any ornamentation as well, and the composition is capped by a ceramic tile roof typical of mission-style churches.

The primary facade is particularly exemplary of the combination of North-American and Hispanic influences. This facade consists of a vertical rectangular frontispiece, surmounted by a bell gable with a bell in each of its two slender Roman arches, and a cross at the ridge, resulting in a composition similar to that of many of the colonial churches found on the island. Nonetheless, the frontispiece is flanked by buttresses and is punctured by a circular window at a second-floor height, reminiscent of the neo-Gothic church architecture common throughout the United States.

A projecting, one-story, cubical reception section provides access to the nave through a semi-circular arch with iron grillework. This foyer area is sheltered by a hipped Spanish tile roof. In addition, its walls are whitewashed, in contrast to the unpainted appearance of the main body of the church, strengthening the impression of a mission-style addition to a Gothic structure.

A small garden surrounds the building, fenced from the sidewalk by iron railings with concrete posts at equal intervals.

== Significance ==
Spain permitted only Catholics to settle in its colonies in the New World: both Jews and Protestants were excluded. By the late 18th and early 19th century, they relaxed their rules to permit non-Roman Catholics to settle in various Spanish colonies, as part of trying to develop the colonies economically by attracting new immigrants.

With the fall of the Spanish monarchy in 1868, the first Spanish republic was formed and the Tolerance of Worship Act was approved the following year. In 1869 the first organized Protestant services in Puerto Rico were held in the city of Ponce, organized by British and other Protestant residents. During that same year, a representative group from this congregation met to plan the establishment of an Anglican church, to be known as the Holy Trinity Church.

Materials were received from Britain, as a present from Queen Victoria to her British subjects abroad. These materials included a bell cast in England, which bears the date 1870. In 1873 the church building began construction.

After the Spanish Republic fell in 1874, the monarchy was reinstated. Religious intolerance returned, and colonial authorities ordered Holy Trinity Church to close. At the intervention of Queen Victoria and the British Consulate, the Spanish crown allowed the Church to function under certain conditions: the front doors were to remain closed, the bell would not be allowed to ring, and no services could be held in Spanish. These measures remained in effect until 25 July 1898, when United States troops entered Ponce. On that day, parishioners rang the bell to greet the soldiers and celebrate the restoration of religious liberty. This bell is still known as the 'Freedom Bell' by the residents of Ponce.

By 1923 the old wood and metal church had deteriorated beyond repair. Funds were raised by public subscription to build a new, more permanent structure on the same site. The new church was completed in 1926 under supervision from the Rev. Philip Locke, who was the rector of Ponce from 1924 to 1931.

It combined the use of neo-Gothic and Spanish colonial elements which synthesize the building's tradition and function: the neo-Gothic represents the British religious heritage while the Spanish colonial symbolizes the community it would serve. The combination of these architectural styles, not common in Puerto Rico, makes this structure a unique example of its kind in the city of Ponce. The 1870 bell from England was installed in the new church.

While other churches of Anglican faith have since combined characteristics of both styles, the Holy Trinity Church appears to represent the clearest convergence, resulting in hybrid forms and elements rather than Spanish applique on a Gothic church. In addition, the church is a good example of construction in a period of cultural and architectural transition in Puerto Rico, using concrete as a main building material, but keeping with the centuries-old tradition of exposed wooden rafters and Spanish-tile roofing.

The synthesis of styles, technologies, and cultures represented in this building, along with the history of the congregation it serves, have been admired and respected by the people of Ponce. It was listed on the National Register of Historic Places.
