= Paul Axtell Kellogg =

Episcopal bishop

Paul Axtell Kellogg (April 11, 1910 – May 28, 1999) was a diocesan bishop in the Episcopal Church who served in the Dominican Republic from 1960 until his retirement in 1972.
