= Episcopal Cathedral of St. John the Baptist (San Juan, Puerto Rico) =

Catedral San Juan Bautista
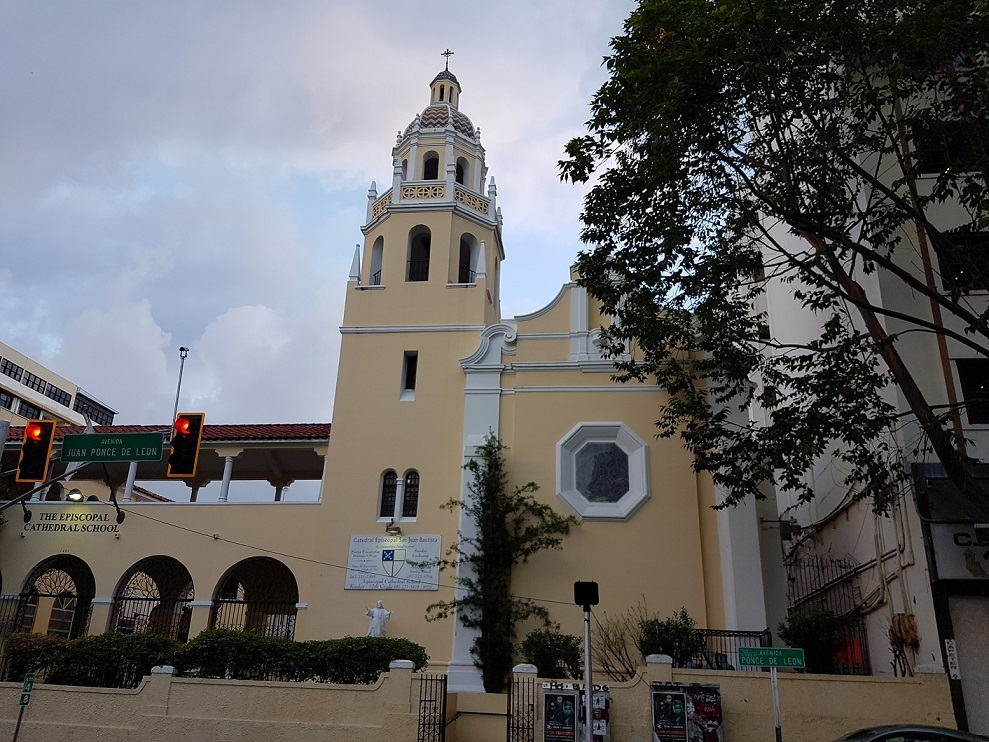
- Catedral San Juan Bautista

- Location within Puerto Rico
- 18°26′54.32″N 66°04′15.53″W
- Location: 1401 Avenida Ponce de Leon; San Juan, Puerto Rico
- Language(s): English & Spanish
- Denomination: Episcopal Church
- Tradition: Broad church & Low church
- Churchmanship: Central churchmanship

History
- Former name: St John the Baptist Church
- Founded: 1899
- Events: David Alvarez

Architecture
- Groundbreaking: February 22, 1929
- Completed: February 1930

Administration
- Diocese: Puerto Rico

Clergy
- Bishop: Rt. Rev. Rafael Morales
- Rector: Very Rev. Mario H. Rodríguez
- Dean: Very Rev. Mario H. Rodríguez Rev. D. Víctor González

The Cathedral of Saint John the Baptist (Spanish: Catedral San Juan Bautista) is an Episcopal cathedral in San Juan, Puerto Rico. It is the seat of the Diocese of Puerto Rico and it is located in the Santurce district of San Juan.

== History ==
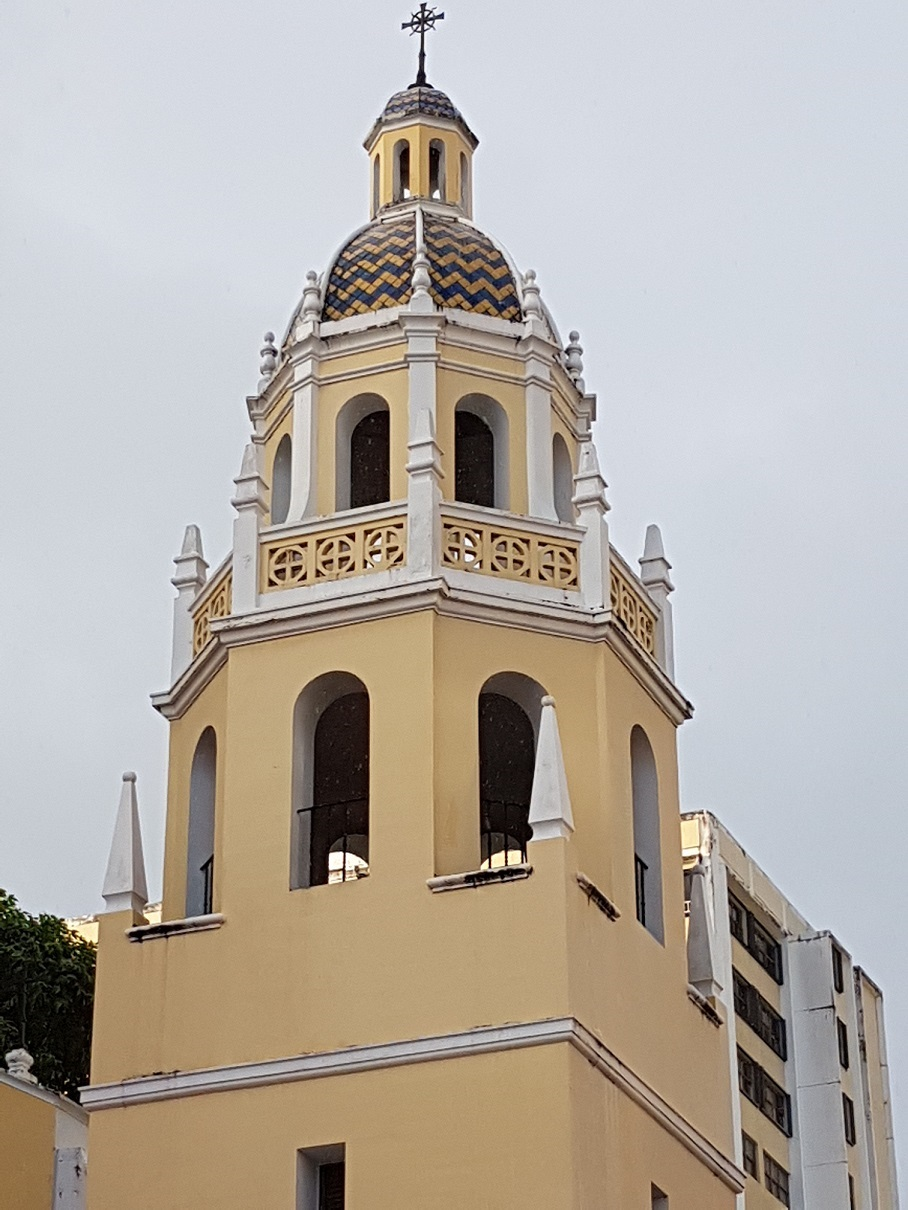
The cathedral's tower

The first service of the Mission of St. John the Baptist was held on March 12, 1899, in a hall on the plaza in Old San Juan. The Rev. James Van Buren came to Puerto Rico in February 1901 and on Christmas Eve of that year St. John's became a parish with Van Buren as the first rector. The cornerstone for the congregation's first church was laid on December 26, 1902. Old San Juan increasingly became a commercial center and its residents moved elsewhere. In 1928 Bishop Charles Colmore proposed relocating St. John's and St. Luke's Church in new locations. The following year the bishop spoke of St. John's and St. Catherine's Training School for Women relocating at Santurce with the hope that St. John's Day School and the rectory would join them. The groundbreaking for the present church took place on February 22, 1929, and it was completed the following February.

== See also ==
- List of the Episcopal cathedrals of the United States
- List of cathedrals in the United States
