= Anglican Church in Central America =

Church organization of Central America

Iglesia Anglicana de la Región Central de América
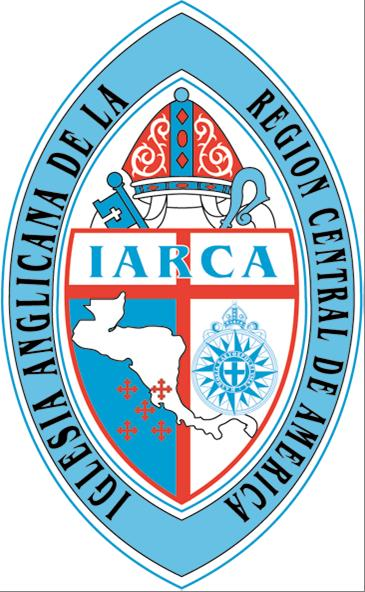
- Classification: Protestant
- Orientation: Anglican
- Scripture: Holy Bible
- Theology: Anglican doctrine
- Polity: Episcopal
- Primate: Ramón Ovalle
- Territory: Costa Rica, El Salvador, Guatemala, Nicaragua, and Panama
- Members: 126,000 (2010)

The Anglican Church in Central America (Spanish: Iglesia Anglicana de la Región Central de América, or IARCA) is a province of the Anglican Communion, covering five sees in Central America. In 2017, Growth and Decline in the Anglican Communion: 1980 to the Present, published by Routledge, collected research reporting there were 126,000 Anglicans in Central America.

== History ==
Four of the five dioceses of the Iglesia Anglicana de la Región Central de America (IARCA) were founded by the Episcopal Church in the United States of America. Anglicanism was also introduced by the Society for the Propagation of the Gospel when the United Kingdom administered two colonies in Central America, British Honduras and Miskitia. In later years, immigrants brought the Anglican Church with them. This first period is often called the time of the chaplaincies. Bishop William C. Frey was consecrated as the first missionary bishop of the Diocese of Guatemala in 1967.

In 1977, the Episcopal Church recognized the Diocese of Costa Rica as autonomous, and in 1978 the newly autonomous diocese elected Costa Rican native Cornelius Wilson as its third bishop. In 1998, the dioceses of El Salvador, Guatemala, Nicaragua and Panama were also granted autonomy from the Episcopal Church, and they combined with the Diocese of Costa Rica to form IARCA. Bishop Wilson was chosen as the first primate of the newly recognized Anglican province.

By 2008, the Anglican Church in Central America had voted to consecrate women bishops although none had yet been consecrated. By 2013, the Diocese of El Salvador offered ministries on behalf of and in support of LGBT members.

=== List of primates ===
1. Cornelius Wilson (1998–2002)
2. Martín Barahona (2002–2010)
3. Armando Guerra (2010–2015)
4. Sturdie Downs (2015–2018)
5. Julio Murray (2018–2022)
6. Juan David Alvarado (2022–2026)
7. Ramón Ovalle (2026–present)

== Membership ==
Today, there are over 35,000 Anglicans out of an estimated population of 30.1 million.

== Structure ==
The polity of the Iglesia Anglicana de la Región Central de América is episcopal, which is the same as other Anglican churches. The church maintains a system of geographical parishes organized into dioceses. There are five dioceses, each headed by a bishop:

- The Diocese of Costa Rica
- The Diocese of El Salvador
- The Diocese of Guatemala
- The Diocese of Nicaragua
- The Diocese of Panamá

Some countries of Central America are part of other Anglican churches:

- The Anglican Diocese of Belize is part of the Church in the Province of the West Indies
- The Episcopal Diocese of Honduras is part of Province 9 of the Episcopal Church in the United States of America

== Worship and liturgy ==
The Iglesia Anglicana de la Región Central de América embraces three orders of ordained ministry: deacon, priest, and bishop. The Spanish-language version of the Episcopal Church (USA)'s 1979 Book of Common Prayer is used.

== Doctrine and practice ==
The center of the Iglesia Anglicana de la Región Central de América's teaching is the life and resurrection of Jesus Christ. The basic teachings of the church, or catechism, includes:

- Jesus Christ is fully human and fully God. He died and was resurrected from the dead.
- Jesus provides the way of eternal life for those who believe.
- The Old and New Testaments of the Bible were written by people "under the inspiration of the Holy Spirit". The Apocrypha are additional books that are used in Christian worship, but not for the formation of doctrine.
- The two great and necessary sacraments are Holy Baptism and Holy Eucharist
- Other sacramental rites are confirmation, ordination, marriage, reconciliation of a penitent, and unction.
- Belief in heaven, hell, and Jesus' return in glory.

=== Ecumenical relations ===
Unlike many other Anglican churches, the Iglesia Anglicana de la Región Central de América is not a member of the ecumenical World Council of Churches.

=== Ordination of women ===
Within the province, there is a diversity of opinions on social issues. Regarding gender equality, the province has dioceses, including the Episcopal Church of Costa Rica, that recognize women in ordained ministry. In 2012, the Episcopal Church in Nicaragua ordained two women as priests.

=== Human sexuality ===
In 2003, the Primate, or Presiding Bishop, of the Anglican Church in Central America attended the consecration of Bishop Gene Robinson, the first openly gay and partnered bishop in the Anglican Communion. The Diocese of El Salvador formed a ministry for LGBT people in the country. In 2014, the Episcopal Church of Costa Rica, a diocese of the province, has taken steps to welcome LGBT members. Also in 2014, the diocese in El Salvador continued to offer a space for LGBT members to "freely express themselves." The Diocese of Guatemala elected Silvestre Enrique Romero as bishop coadjutor in 2017. Romero, prior to being elected bishop, served in the US Episcopal Church and offered to bless same-sex unions as priest-in-charge.

== See also ==
- Cornelius Wilson, Bishop of Costa Rica
