= Province 9 of the Episcopal Church =

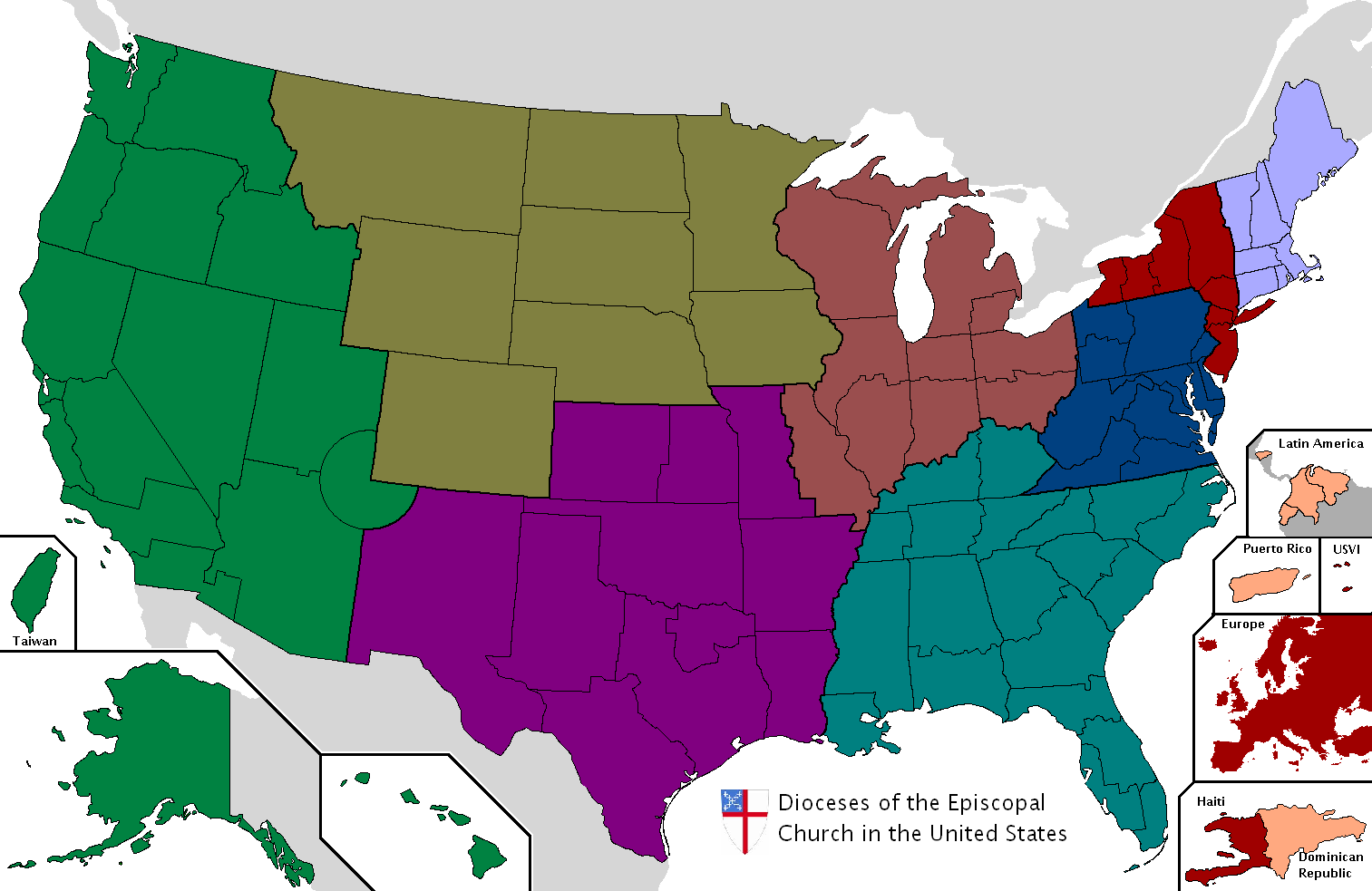
Province IX of the ECUSA

Province 9 (IX) is one of nine ecclesiastical provinces making up the Episcopal Church in the United States of America. It comprises seven dioceses in Latin America and the Caribbean. Julio Cesar Holguin Khoury of the Diocese of the Dominican Republic serves as president and Victor Scantlebury (1945-2020) of the Diocese of Central Ecuador was a vice president.

== Dioceses of Province IX ==
- Colombia (Bogotá)
- Dominican Republic
- Central Ecuador
- Litoral Ecuador (Guayaquil)
- Honduras (San Pedro Sula)
- Venezuela (Caracas)

== References and external links ==
- "Browse By Province". The Episcopal Church. The Domestic and Foreign Missionary Society.
- "IX Provincia de la Iglesia Episcopal" (in Spanish).
