= J. Warren Hutchens =

American bishop

The Right Reverend Joseph Warren Hutchens
- Bishop of Connecticut
- Church: Episcopal Church
- Diocese: Connecticut
- Elected: January 14, 1971
- In office: 1971–1977
- Predecessor: John H. Esquirol
- Successor: Morgan Porteus
- Previous post: Suffragan Bishop of Connecticut (1961-1971)

Orders
- Ordination: December 1937 by George Craig Stewart
- Consecration: November 14, 1961 by Walter H. Gray

Personal details
- Born: January 20, 1910 Elnora, Indiana, United States
- Died: August 4, 1979 (aged 69) Litchfield, Connecticut, United States
- Denomination: Anglican
- Parents: Lewis Hutchens & Hallie Mable Wyeth
- Spouse: Carolyn Hilton
- Children: 2

Joseph Warren Hutchens (January 20, 1910 – August 4, 1979) was diocesan bishop of the Episcopal Diocese of Connecticut from 1971 to 1977. He had served previously as suffragan from 1961.

== Early life and education ==
Hutchens was born on January 20, 1910, in Elnora, Indiana, the son of the Reverend Dr Lewis Hutchens and Hallie Mable Wyeth. He was raised as a Methodist. In 1927 he studied at the Indiana University and at Evansville College, from where he graduated with a Bachelor of Arts. He received his master's degree from Northwestern University and the Garrett Biblical Institute. He joined the Episcopal Church and was received as a candidate for the priesthood by the Bishop of Chicago George Craig Stewart. He studied at the General Theological Seminary from where he graduated with a Bachelor of Sacred Theology in 1937. In 1961 he received a number of honorary doctorates by General Theological Seminary, Trinity College in Hartford, and Berkeley Divinity School in New Haven, and by Evansville College in 1965.

== Priest ==
Hutchens was ordained a deacon in June 1937 and priest that same December, on both occasions by Bishop George Craig Stewart of Chicago. He served as curate of St Luke's Pro-Cathedral in Evanston, Illinois till 1939. He then became the assistant priest of St John's Church in Bridgeport, Connecticut, and in 1940, rector of the same church. From 1949, he also served as a board member of the Board for examining chaplains of the Diocese of Connecticut. In 1955 he became a member of the standing committee. He served as deputy to the 1958 and 1961 General Conventions.

== Bishop ==
Hutchens was elected Suffragan Bishop of Connecticut on September 12, 1961, during a special convention of the diocese. He was elected on the second ballot, among six other candidates. He was consecrated on November 14, 1961, by Bishop Walter H. Gray of Connecticut in Christ Church Cathedral in Hartford, Connecticut. He was elected to serve as diocesan bishop of Connecticut, ten years later on January 14, 1971. His main achievements as bishop concerned the reorganization of the diocese to enhance the participation of the laity. He was also instrumental in establishing a historical research aspect in the diocese, notably concerning the preparation and writing of parish histories. Hutchens retired in 1977 and was given the title of Bishop Emeritus of Connecticut in 1978 by the General Convention. He died in Litchfield, Connecticut following a lengthy illness on August 4, 1979.

== Family ==
Hutchens and Carolyn Hilton married on November 19, 1940, and together they had two daughters.

Episcopal Church (USA) titles
Preceded by John H. Esquirol	10th Bishop of Connecticut; 1971–1977	Succeeded by Morgan Porteus
Vacant Title last held by John H. Esquirol	Suffragan Bishop of Connecticut; 1961–1971	Succeeded by Morgan Porteus
