= Chauncey B. Brewster =

American bishop (1848–1941)

The Right Reverend Chauncey Bunce Brewster
- Bishop of Connecticut
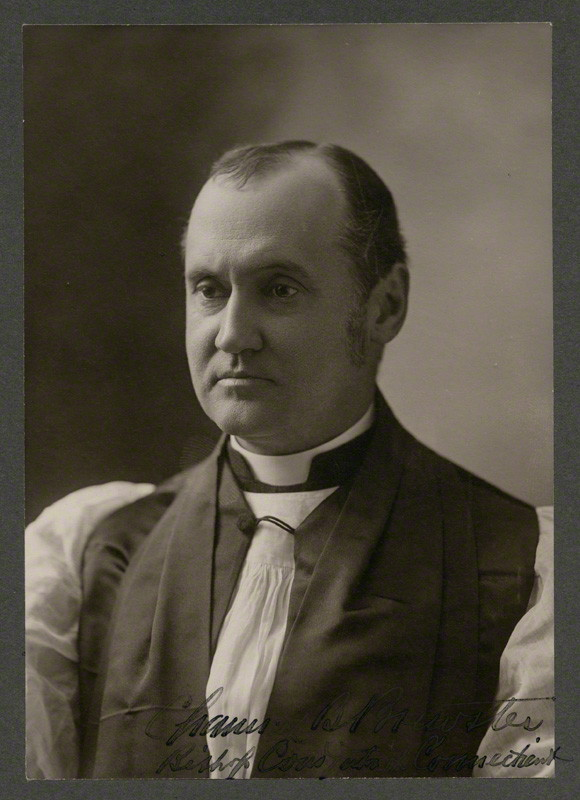
- Church: Episcopal Church
- Diocese: Connecticut
- Elected: June 8, 1896
- In office: 1899–1928
- Predecessor: John Williams
- Successor: Edward Campion Acheson
- Previous post: Coadjutor Bishop of Connecticut (1897-1899)

Orders
- Ordination: May 30, 1873 by John Williams
- Consecration: October 28, 1897 by Abram Newkirk Littlejohn

Personal details
- Born: September 5, 1848 Windham, Connecticut, United States
- Died: April 9, 1941 (aged 92) Hartford, Connecticut, United States
- Buried: Evergreen Cemetery (New Haven, Connecticut)
- Denomination: Anglican
- Parents: Joseph Brewster & Sarah Jane Bunce
- Spouse: Susan Huntington Whitney (m. October 15, 1873); Alice Tucker Stephenson (m. June 20, 1893)

The Rt. Rev. Dr. Chauncey Bunce Brewster (September 5, 1848 – April 9, 1941) was the fifth Bishop of the Episcopal Diocese of Connecticut.

== Early life and education ==
Coat of arms of William Brewster

Brewster was born in Windham, Connecticut, to the Rev. Joseph Brewster and Sarah Jane Bunce. His father was rector of St Paul's Church in Windham, New York, and later became rector of Christ Church in New Haven, Connecticut. His younger brother was Benjamin Brewster, later Bishop of Western Colorado. The family were descendants of the Mayflower passenger William Brewster.

Brewster attended Hopkins Grammar School before studying at Yale College, where he was elected Phi Beta Kappa and was a member of the Skull and Bones society. He graduated from Yale in 1868 and attended Berkeley Divinity School the following year, graduating from there in 1872.

He was later awarded a Doctor of Divinity (DD) degree by Trinity College (1897), Yale (1898) and Wesleyan University (1903).

== Career ==
Brewster was a tutor in Latin and Greek at Yale from 1870 to 1871 before being ordained deacon in 1872 and priest in 1873.

He then served as curate of St Andrew's Church in Meriden, Connecticut (1872−1873), rector of Christ's Church in Rye, New York (1873−1882), rector of Christ Church in Detroit, Michigan (1882−1885), rector of Grace Church in Baltimore, Maryland (1885−1888) and rector of Grace Church in Brooklyn Heights, New York (1888−1897).

Brewster was consecrated as a bishop on October 28, 1897, and was a coadjutor bishop before serving as diocesan bishop from 1899 to 1928.

He was the author of The Key of Life (1894), Aspects of Revelation (1901), The Catholic Ideal of the Church (1905) and The Kingdom of God and American Life (1912).

Brewster Hall at Berkeley Divinity School was named in his honor in 1940. He died the following year and is buried in the Evergreen Cemetery in New Haven, Connecticut.

== Family ==
Brewster married his first wife, Susan Huntington Whitney, daughter of Eli Whitney, in 1873 and had one son. Both his wife and his son died in May 1885, and in 1893 he married Alice Tucker Stephenson, with whom he had one daughter.

Episcopal Church (USA) titles
Preceded by John Williams	5th Bishop of Connecticut; 1899–1928	Succeeded by Edward Campion Acheson
