= Bradford Hastings =

The Right Reverend William Bradford Turner Hastings D.D.
- Suffragan Bishop of Connecticut
- Church: Episcopal Church
- Diocese: Connecticut
- Elected: May 16, 1981
- In office: 1981–1986

Orders
- Ordination: May 1944 by William Scarlett
- Consecration: October 23, 1981 by John Allin

Personal details
- Born: December 13, 1919 Garden City, New York, United States
- Died: December 2, 1992 (aged 72) Little Compton, Rhode Island, United States
- Denomination: Anglican
- Parents: Alfred Abbott Hastings & Dorothy Quincy Turner
- Spouse: Virginia Floyd
- Children: 4

William Bradford Turner Hastings (December 13, 1919 - December 2, 1992) was suffragan bishop of the Episcopal Diocese of Connecticut from his election in 1981 until his retirement in 1986.

== Early life and education ==
Hastings was born on December 13, 1919, in Garden City, New York, the son of the Reverend Alfred Abbott Hastings and Dorothy Quincy Turner. He was educated at the Trinity-Pawling School, before studying at the Union College from where he graduated with a Bachelor of Arts in 1941. On July 31, 1942, he married Virginia Floyd and together had four children. He then enrolled at the Virginia Theological Seminary from where he earned his Bachelor of Divinity in 1943.

== Ordained ministry ==
Hastings was ordained deacon on September 26, 1943, in St Paul's Church in Troy, New York, by Bishop G. Ashton Oldham of Albany. He was then ordained priest in March 1944 by Bishop William Scarlett of Missouri. Between 1943 and 1946 he served as rector of St Paul's Church in Overland, Missouri. In 1946 he became rector of Trinity Church in Concord, Massachusetts. He then moved to Minnesota to become rector of Christ Church in Saint Paul, Minnesota and in 1954, he became rector of St Luke's Church in Minneapolis, Minnesota. In 1959 he became rector of All Saints Church in Worcester, Massachusetts. Between 1965 and 1981, he served as rector of Christ Church in Greenwich, Connecticut.

== Episcopacy ==
On May 16, 1981, Hastings was elected Suffragan Bishop of Connecticut during a special convention at Christ Church in Hartford, Connecticut. He was consecrated on October 23, 1981, in Roman Catholic Cathedral of St Joseph by Presiding Bishop John Allin. He retired in 1986.

Episcopal Church (USA) titles
Vacant Title last held by Morgan Porteus	Suffragan Bishop of Connecticut; 1981–1986	Succeeded by Clarence Coleridge
