= Episcopal Diocese of Connecticut =

Episcopal Church diocese in the US

Diocese of Connecticut

Location
- Country: United States
- Territory: Connecticut
- Ecclesiastical province: Province I

Statistics
- Congregations: 151 (2024)
- Members: 36,743 (2023)

Information
- Denomination: Episcopal Church
- Established: August 3, 1785
- Cathedral: Christ Church Cathedral
- Language: English, Spanish

Current leadership
- Bishop: Jeffrey Mello
- Suffragans: Laura J. Ahrens

Map
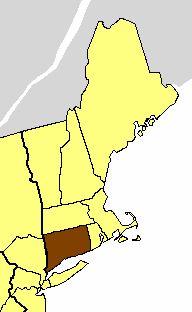
- The Episcopal Church in Connecticut

Website
- www.episcopalct.org

The Episcopal Diocese of Connecticut (also known as The Episcopal Church in Connecticut) is a diocese of the Episcopal Church in the United States of America, encompassing the entire state of Connecticut. It is one of the nine original dioceses of the Episcopal Church and one of seven New England dioceses that make up Province 1.

== Overview ==
Anglican services have been conducted in Connecticut since 1702. The diocese was established on 22 June 1785 following the American Revolution, and is one of the nine original dioceses of the Episcopal Church. The inaugural diocesan bishop was the Rt. Rev. Samuel Seabury, the first Anglican bishop with a see outside the British Isles; he also served as Presiding Bishop of the Church.

Later bishops included the Rt. Rev. Walter H. Gray, who was also the first chair of the Civil Rights Commission in Connecticut and played a leading role in two meetings of the Lambeth Conference. The Most Rev. Desmond Tutu, Archbishop Emeritus of Cape Town, preached at the consecration of the 15th Bishop of Connecticut, the Rt. Rev. Ian Douglas, in 2010. Douglas was assisted by the Rt. Rev. Laura J. Ahrens as suffragan, the first woman to be elected bishop in Connecticut. The Rt. Rev. Jeffrey Mello succeeded Douglas as the 16th Bishop of Connecticut in 2022.

The bishop's cathedra is situated at Christ Church Cathedral in Hartford, and the diocesan offices are located in Meriden.

As of 2023 the diocese had a reported membership of 36,743, down from 68,000 in 2003. In 2024, the diocese reported average Sunday attendance (ASA) of 8,085 persons and plate and pledge financial support of $31,763,735. No membership statistics were reported in 2024 national parochial reports.

== List of bishops ==
Bishops of Connecticut
From	Until	Incumbent	Notes
1784	1796	Samuel Seabury	Also Presiding Bishop 1789–1792 and Bishop of Rhode Island 1790−1796; died in office.
1797	1813	Abraham Jarvis	Died in office.
1819	1865	Thomas Church Brownell	Also Presiding Bishop 1852−1865; died in office.
1865	1899	John Williams	Previously coadjutor since 1851; also Presiding Bishop 1887−1899; also provisional bishop of Mexico; died in office.
1899	1928	Chauncey Bunce Brewster	Previously coadjutor since 1897.
1928	1934	Edward Campion Acheson	Previously suffragan 1915–1926 and coadjutor since 1926.
1934	1950	Frederick Grandy Budlong	Previously coadjutor since 1931.
1951	1969	Walter Henry Gray	Previously suffragan 1940–1945 and coadjutor since 1945.
1951	1957	Robert McConnell Hatch, suffragan bishop	Later Bishop of Western Massachusetts.
1969	1970	John Henry Esquirol	Previously suffragan since 1958.
1971	1977	Joseph Warren Hutchens	Previously suffragan since 1961.
1977	1981	Morgan Porteus	Previously suffragan 1971–1976 and coadjutor since 1976.
1981	1993	Arthur Edward Walmsley	Previously coadjutor since 1979.
1981	1986	William Bradford Turner Hastings, suffragan bishop	
1993	1999	Clarence Nicholas Coleridge	Previously suffragan since 1981; later assisting bishop in Pennsylvania; first African-American bishop in Connecticut and third in the United States.
1987	1993	Jeffrey William Rowthorn, suffragan bishop	Later bishop-in-charge in Europe.
1999	2010	Andrew Donnan Smith	Previously suffragan since 1996.
2000	2014	James Elliot Curry, suffragan bishop	
2000	2005	Wilfrido Ramos-Orench, suffragan bishop	Later provisional bishop in Central Ecuador.
2007	present	Laura Jean Ahrens, suffragan bishop	
2010	2022	Ian Theodore Douglas	
2022	present	Jeffrey William Mello	

== Churches ==
The diocese is divided into six geographical areas known as regions. As of 2022, the there were approximately 190 places of worship in the diocese.

=== Northwest region ===
- All Saints with Christ, Oakville
- All Saints' Church, Wolcott
- Christ Church, Bethlehem
- Christ Church, Roxbury
- Christ Church, Sharon
- Christ Church, Waterbury
- Church of the Epiphany, Southbury
- St. Andrew's Church, Kent
- St. Andrew's Church, Dale
- St. Andrew's Church, Washington
- St. George's Church, Middlebury
- St. James's Church, Winsted
- St. John's Church, New Milford
- St. John's Church, Pine Meadow
- St. John's Church, Salisbury
- St. John's Church, Washington
- St. John's Church, Waterbury
- St. Mark's Church, Bridgewater
- St. Michael's Church, Litchfield
- St. Paul's Church, Bantam
- St. Paul's Church, Brookfield
- St. Paul's Church, Woodbury
- St. Peter's-Trinity Church, Thomaston
- Trinity Church, Lime Rock
- Trinity Church, Litchfield
- Trinity Church, Torrington

=== North central region ===
- Christ Church, Middle Haddam
- Church of the Good Shepherd, Bristol
- Church of the Good Shepherd, Hartford
- Church of the Epiphany, Durham
- Emmanuel Church, Killingworth
- Grace Church, Hartford
- Grace Church, Newington
- Grace Church, Windsor
- Holy Trinity Church, Middletown
- Old St. Andrew's Church, Bloomfield
- St. Alban's Church, Simsbury
- St. Andrew the Apostle Church, Rocky Hill
- St. Andrew's Church, Meriden
- St. Gabriel's Church, Berlin
- St. James's Church, Farmington
- St. James's Church, Higganum
- St. James's Church, West Hartford
- St. John's Church, East Hartford
- St. John's Church, West Hartford
- St. Luke's Church, South Glastonbury
- St. Mark's Church, New Britain
- St. Martin's Church, Hartford
- St. Monica's Church, Hartford
- St. Paul's Church, Southington
- St. Stephen's Church, Bloomfield
- Todos los Santos Church, Meriden
- Trinity Church, Collinsville
- Trinity Church, Hartford
- Trinity Church, Portland
- Trinity Church, Tariffville
- Trinity Church, Wethersfield

=== Northeast region ===
- All Saints' Church, Hartford
- Christ Church, Pomfret
- Grace Church, Stafford
- Holy Trinity Church, Enfield
- St. George's Church, Bolton
- St. James's Church, Glastonbury
- St. John's Church, East Windsor
- St. John's Church, Vernon
- St. Mark's Church, Storrs
- St. Mary's Church, Manchester
- St. Paul's Church, Plainfield
- St. Paul's Church, Willimantic
- St. Paul's Church, Windham
- St. Peter's Church, Hebron
- St. Peter's Church, South Windsor
- Trinity Church, Brooklyn

=== Southwest region ===
- Calvary-St. George's Church, Bridgeport
- Christ and Holy Trinity Church, Easton
- Christ Church, Greenwich
- Christ Church, Norwalk
- Christ Church, Reading
- Christ Church, Stratford
- Christ Church, Tashua
- Église de l'Épiphanie, Stamford
- Emmanuel Church, Weston
- Grace Church, Trumbull
- Iglesia Betania, Stamford
- San Lucas y San Pablo Church, Bridgeport
- St. Andrew's Church, Stamford
- St. Barnabas Church, Greenwich
- St. Francis Church, Stamford
- St. James's Church, Danbury
- St. John's Church, Bridgeport
- St. John's Church, Stamford
- St. Luke's Church, Darien
- St. Mark's Church, Bridgeport
- St. Mark's Church, New Canaan
- St. Matthew's Church, Wilton
- St. Paul's on the Green, Norwalk
- St. Paul's Church, Darien
- St. Paul's Church, Fairfield
- St. Paul's Church, Riverside
- St. Paul's Church, Shelton
- St. Peter's on the Green, Monroe
- St. Peter's, Milford
- St. Saviour's Church, Old Greenwich
- St. Stephen's Church, Ridgefield
- St. Thomas Church, Bethel
- Trinity-St. Michael's Church, Fairfield
- Trinity Church, Newtown
- Trinity Church, Southport
- Trinity Church, Trumbull

=== South central region ===
- Christ Church, Ansonia
- Christ Church, Bethany
- Christ Church, Guilford
- Christ Church, New Haven
- Christ Church, Oxford
- Church of Christ and the Epiphany, East Haven
- Church of Immanuel and St. James, Derby
- Church of the Good Shepherd, Orange
- Church of the Good Shepherd, Shelton
- Church of the Holy Spirit, West Haven
- Grace and St. John's Church, Hamden
- St. Andrew's Church, Northford
- St. Andrew's Church, Milford
- St. James's Church, New Haven
- St. John the Evangelist Church, Yalesville
- St. John's Church, Guilford
- St. John's Church, New Haven
- St. Luke's Church, New Haven
- St. Michael's Church, Naugatuck
- St. Paul and St. James's Church, New Haven
- St. Paul's Church, Wallingford
- St. Peter's Church, Cheshire
- St. Peter's Church, Oxford
- St. Thomas Church, New Haven
- Trinity Church on the Green, New Haven
- Trinity Church, Branford
- Trinity Church, Seymour
- Zion Church, North Branford

=== Southeast region ===
- All Saints' Church, Ivoryton
- Calvary Church, Stonington
- Grace Church, Old Saybrook
- Grace Church, Yantic
- Holy Advent Church, Clinton
- St. Andrew's Church, Madison
- St. Ann's Church, Old Lyme
- St. David's Church, Gales Ferry
- St. James's Church, New London
- St. James's Church, Preston
- St. John's Church, Essex
- St. John's Church, Niantic
- St. Mark's Church, Mystic
- St. Paul's Church, Westbrook
- St. Stephen's Church, East Haddam

== See also ==
- List of Episcopal bishops
