= Morgan Porteus =

American Episcopal clergyman (1917–2019)

The Right Reverend Morgan Porteus
- Bishop of Connecticut
- Church: Episcopal Church
- Diocese: Connecticut
- In office: 1977–1981
- Predecessor: J. Warren Hutchens
- Successor: Arthur E. Walmsley
- Previous posts: Suffragan Bishop of Connecticut (1971-1975); Coadjutor Bishop of Connecticut (1975-1977)

Orders
- Ordination: June 1, 1944 by Frederick G. Budlong
- Consecration: October 13, 1971 by John E. Hines

Personal details
- Born: August 10, 1917 Hartford, Connecticut, U.S.
- Died: December 15, 2019 (aged 102) Wellfleet, Massachusetts, U.S.
- Denomination: Anglican
- Parents: Robert William Porteus & Ruth Morgo
- Spouse: Martha A. Walsh (1919-2002)
- Children: 3

Morgan Porteus (August 10, 1917 – December 15, 2019) was an Episcopal clergyman in Connecticut who served as the eleventh bishop of that diocese.

== Early life and education ==
Porteus was born on August 10, 1917, in Hartford, Connecticut. In 1941 he graduated with a B.A. in History and Government from Bates College. Later he studied theology at the Episcopal Theological School where he graduated with a Bachelor of Sacred Theology in 1943.

== Ordination ==
Porteus was ordained to the diaconate on September 29, 1943, and to the priesthood on June 1, 1944. He served as rector of St Peter's Church in Cheshire, Connecticut from 1944 to 1971.

== Bishop ==
Porteus was elected Suffragan Bishop of Connecticut in 1971 and was consecrated on October 13, 1971, by Presiding Bishop John E. Hines, a consecration which was recorded live by radio and television, something rare for that time. In 1975 he was elected as bishop coadjutor of Connecticut; on September 1, 1977, succeeded as diocesan bishop and was installed on November 19, 1977. He retired in 1981. Porteus died in Wellfleet, Massachusetts in December 2019 at the age of 102.

Episcopal Church (USA) titles
Preceded by J. Warren Hutchens	Bishop of Connecticut; 1977–1981	Succeeded by Arthur E. Walmsley
Preceded by J. Warren Hutchens	Suffragan Bishop of Connecticut; October 13, 1971 – 1976	Vacant Title next held by Bradford Hastings
Vacant Title last held by Walter H. Gray	Bishop Coadjutor of Connecticut; 1976–1977	Vacant Title next held by Arthur E. Walmsley
