= Esquirol =

Esquirol means scab (strikebreaker) in Spanish, and squirrel in Catalan and Occitan. It is also a surname and may refer to:

- Jean-Étienne Dominique Esquirol (1772–1840), French psychiatrist
- John H. Esquirol (1900–1970), American Episcopal bishop
- Joseph A. Esquirol (1898–1981), New York politician

== See also ==
- Charenton (asylum), commonly referred to as the "Esquirol Hospital"
- L'Esquirol, a municipality in Catalonia
