= St. Thomas's Episcopal Church (New Haven, Connecticut) =

- St. Thomas's Episcopal Church
- 41°19′55″N 72°54′48″W
- Location: New Haven, Connecticut
- Denomination: Episcopal Church
- Website: www.stthomasnewhaven.org

History
- Founded: 1848
- Consecrated: October 8, 1939

Administration
- Diocese: Diocese of Connecticut

St. Thomas's Episcopal Church is a parish church of the Episcopal Church located in New Haven, Connecticut. Founded in 1848, the original English Gothic church was completed in 1855 on Elm Street, on the site of a temporary chapel the parish built in 1849. St. Thomas moved to its present site on Whitney Avenue in 1939.

The church reported 219 members in 2017 and 103 members in 2023; no membership statistics were reported in 2024 parochial reports. Plate and pledge income for the congregation in 2024 was $94,377 with average Sunday attendance (ASA) of 39. This was a relative decrease from ASA of 113 persons reported in 2015.

== History ==
=== Early years ===
On February 24, 1848, a meeting was held by sixteen lay Episcopalians in New Haven, Connecticut, to discuss the opening of a third Episcopal church in the city. The first services were held in a room that belonged to Center Church (Congregationalist) on April 23, 1848, where they remained until 1849.

=== Elm Street 1849–1939 ===
The rector purchased a lot on Elm Street that year, and began construction of a temporary chapel. Five months later, the first services were held in the chapel on August 12, 1849. The congregation decided that a new, larger church would be built on the site of the existing chapel, and the last services in the chapel were held on March 12, 1854. One month later, the cornerstone of the new church was laid, with Bishop John Williams in attendance. In the meantime, services were held in Brewster Hall. The completed church was consecrated on April 19, 1855. It was constructed in the English Gothic Revival style out of Portland brownstone. A parish house was not built until 1888. The cornerstone was laid on May 21, and the building was dedicated on February 3, 1889.

In 1893, the composer Charles Ives served as an organist at the church.

=== Relocation to Whitney Avenue ===
In 1923, the rector proposed that the church relocate to another part of New Haven, as Elm Street had become commercialized since the founding of the church. The congregation purchased a lot on Whitney Avenue, between Ogden and Cliff Streets in 1923. There, a new parish house was constructed in 1931. A new church was constructed there, and consecrated on October 8, 1939. The new buildings were designed by Allen, Collens & Willis in the English Gothic style.

=== Founding of St. Thomas's Day School ===
In 1956, the Rev. William R. Robbins and Dr. Dorothy Asch established St. Thomas's Day School, a private elementary school on the grounds of the church. In 1992, the church added a new wing to the parish hall to accommodate the growth of the school.

=== Leadership on same-sex marriage in the Episcopal Church ===
In 2005, during the rectorship of the Rev. Michael F. Ray, the vestry of St. Thomas's adopted a resolution calling for the church to treat all couples equally in administering the sacrament of marriage. Because Connecticut's Episcopal bishop Andrew Smith prohibited churches in the state to perform same-sex marriages at that time, the parish imposed a moratorium on all marriage ceremonies. The moratorium lasted for two years, ending when the Episcopal Diocese of Connecticut permitted churches to bless same-sex unions.

== Rectors ==
Start	End	Name
1848	1891	The Rev. Eben Edwards Beardsley, DD
1892	1934	The Rev. William A. Beardsley, DD
1934	1949	The Rev. Robert S. Flockhart, DD
1949	1984	The Rev. William R. Robbins, S.T.D.
1985	2015	The Rev. Michael F. Ray
2015	2023	The Rev. Keri T. Aubert
2024	present	The Rev. Alan C. Murchie
