= Robert McConnell Hatch =

American bishop

The Right Reverend Robert McConnell Hatch
- Bishop of Western Massachusetts
- Church: Episcopal Church
- Diocese: Western Massachusetts
- In office: 1957–1970
- Predecessor: William Appleton Lawrence
- Successor: Alexander Doig Stewart
- Previous post: Suffragan Bishop of Connecticut (1951-1957)

Orders
- Ordination: May 1940 by Henry Knox Sherrill
- Consecration: April 17, 1951 by Henry Knox Sherrill

Personal details
- Born: July 6, 1910 Brooklyn, New York City, New York, United States
- Died: July 16, 2009 (aged 99) Louisville, Colorado, United States
- Denomination: Anglican
- Parents: William Henry Paine Hatch & Marion Louise Townsend
- Spouse: Helen Crocker Addison
- Children: 2

Robert McConnell Hatch (July 6, 1910 – July 16, 2009) was a suffragan bishop of the Episcopal Diocese of Connecticut (1951-1957) and fourth bishop of the Episcopal Diocese of Western Massachusetts (1957–1970).

== Education ==
Hatch was born in Brooklyn, New York City on July 6, 1910, the son of the Reverend William Henry Paine Hatch (1875-1972) and Marion Louise Townsend (1881-1960). He was educated at St Mark's School in Southboro, Massachusetts and Harvard University. He also studied at Columbia University where he graduated with a master's in history in 1935. He also studied at the Episcopal Theological Seminary from which he earned his Bachelor of Divinity in 1939.

== Priest ==
Hatch was ordained deacon in 1939 and a priest in May 1940 by Bishop Henry Knox Sherrill of Massachusetts. He was appointed curate of Trinity Church, Boston where he remained until 1941 when he became rector of St John's Church in Arlington, Massachusetts. He transferred to Wilmington, Delaware where he became Dean of the Cathedral of St John in 1945. In 1946 he was also deputy of the General Convention and between 1947 and 1948 he served as president of the standing committee of the Diocese of Delaware. In 1948 he became rector of St John's Church in Waterbury, Connecticut.

== Bishop ==
For seven years, Hatch served as Suffragan Bishop of Connecticut. He was elected on January 30, 1951, at a special diocesan convention which took place in Hartford, Connecticut. He was consecrated by the Presiding Bishop Henry Knox Sherrill on April 17, 1951, in St John's Church in Waterbury, Connecticut. In 1957 he was elected Bishop of Western Massachusetts where he remained until 1970. After retirement he served as an Interim in Berlin, New Hampshire.

== Writings ==
Hatch is known for his writings on 'What is meant by Christian Marriage' and 'What is meant by Christian Burial'. He also wrote two books related to the American War for Independence.

== Personal life ==
Hatch married Helen Crocker Addison in 1940 and together had two children.

== Bibliography ==
- Major John André: A Gallant in Spy's Clothing. Boston: Houghton Mifflin. 1986. ISBN 0-395-35324-6.

== See also ==
- List of bishops of the Episcopal Church in the United States of America

Episcopal Church (USA) titles
| Preceded by William Appleton Lawrence | 4th Bishop of Western Massachusetts; 1957–1970 | Succeeded by Alexander Doig Stewart |
| Vacant Title last held by Walter H. Gray | Suffragan Bishop of Connecticut; 1951–1957 | Succeeded by John H. Esquirol |
