= Laura J. Ahrens =

American prelate (born 1962)

The Right Reverend Laura Ahrens
- Suffragan Bishop of Connecticut
- Church: Episcopal Church
- Diocese: Connecticut
- Elected: March 10, 2007
- In office: 2007–present
- Predecessor: Wilfrido Ramos-Orench

Orders
- Ordination: 1991 (deacon); 1992 (priest)
- Consecration: June 30, 2007 by Katharine Jefferts Schori

Personal details
- Born: August 9, 1962 (age 64)
- Denomination: Anglican
- Parents: Herbert and Joan Ahrens

Laura Jean Ahrens (born August 9, 1962) is an American prelate who currently serves as the Suffragan Bishop of Connecticut in the Episcopal Church.

== Education ==
Ahrens studied at Princeton University and graduated with a Bachelor of Arts in geology and geophysics in 1984. She then studied at the Berkeley Divinity School, where she earned her Master of Divinity in 1991. She also holds a Doctor of Ministry from Hartford Seminary, which she was awarded in 2000. She graduated with her doctoral thesis titled Engaging a Generation, Adult Education for Baby Boomers.

== Ordained ministry ==
Ahrens was ordained deacon in 1991 and priest in 1992. She spent her diaconate and the first year of her priesthood as curate of St Peter's Church in Osterville, Massachusetts. In 1992, she became associate rector of Trinity Church in Concord, Massachusetts, while in 1995 she then became associate rector of St Luke's Church in Darien, Connecticut. Between 2000 and 2007, she served as rector of St James' Church in Danbury, Connecticut.

== Bishop ==
On March 10, 2007, Ahrens was elected on the fifth ballot as Suffragan Bishop of Connecticut at a special convention held in Christ Church Cathedral, Hartford. She was consecrated on June 30, 2007, in the Woolsey Hall of Yale University, with Presiding Bishop Katharine Jefferts Schori as chief consecrator.

== See also ==
- List of Episcopal bishops of the United States
- Historical list of the Episcopal bishops of the United States

Episcopal Church (USA) titles
Preceded by Wilfrido Ramos-Orench; James Elliot Curry	Suffragan Bishop of Connecticut; June 30, 2007 – Present; With: James Elliot Curry	Current holder
