= Bishop Curry =

Bishop Curry may refer to:

- James E. Curry (b. 1948), suffragan bishop of the Episcopal Diocese of Connecticut
- L. F. P. Curry (1887–1977), presiding bishop of the Reorganized Church of Jesus Christ of Latter Day Saints
- Michael Curry (bishop) (b. 1953), presiding bishop of the Episcopal Church
- Thomas John Curry (b. 1943), auxiliary bishop of the Catholic Archdiocese of Los Angeles
