= Ian Douglas =

Ian Douglas may refer to:

- Ian Douglas (author), pseudonym of American author William H. Keith, Jr.
- Ian Douglas (bishop), American bishop
- Ian Douglas (politician), Dominican politician

== See also ==
- Iain Douglas-Hamilton (born 1942), zoologist
- Ian Akers-Douglas (1909–1952), English cricketer
