= St. John's Episcopal Church (Hartford, Connecticut) =

Coordinates: 41.7630°N 72.6739°W

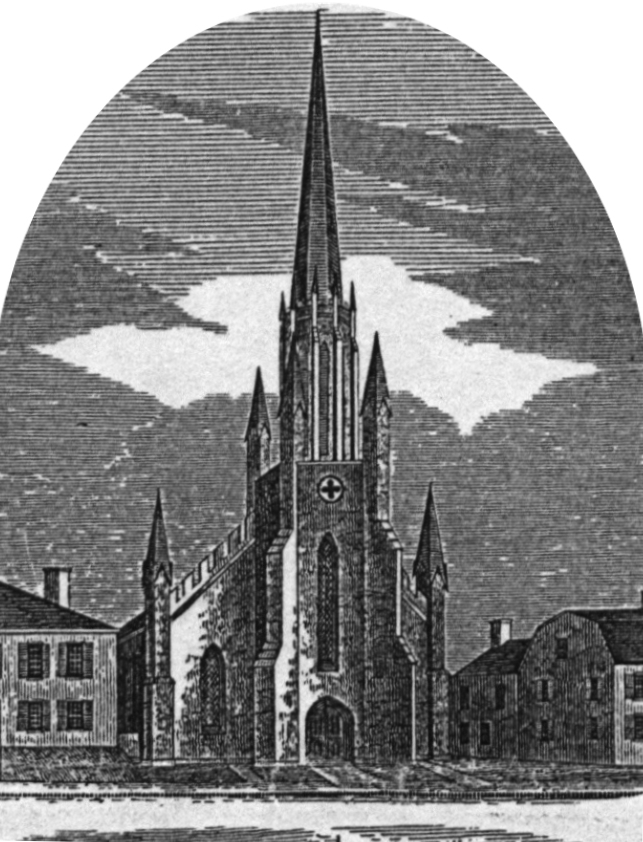
St. John's Episcopal Church (1842-1907), Hartford, CT

The parish of St. John's Episcopal Church, Hartford, Connecticut, was formed in 1841. Its first building, designed by Henry Austin (architect), was constructed on Main Street just south of the Wadsworth Atheneum in 1842. The parish left Hartford in 1907 and is now St. John's Episcopal Church (West Hartford, Connecticut).

== Congregation History ==
St. John's was founded in 1841 in downtown Hartford, Connecticut in response to overcrowding at nearby Christ Church (Hartford, Connecticut). An activist organization, St. John's was instrumental in the development of other prominent Hartford area churches including the Church of the Good Shepherd and Parish House (Hartford, Connecticut), St. John's Episcopal Church (East Hartford, Connecticut), and St. Monica's, the second Episcopal congregation in the state for Black Americans. As the nineteenth century progressed, the western suburbs became increasingly popular as a place for city dwellers to live with the result that the number of St. John's worshipers was in decline. In 1907, financier J. P. Morgan purchased the church building and its property for the construction of a memorial gallery to be added to Hartford's Wadsworth Atheneum. The parish then moved to suburban West Hartford, Connecticut, which was undergoing steady growth.

== Hartford Church Building ==
Designed by Henry Austin (architect), St. John's (Hartford) was the first church building attributed to that prolific artisan. Having assisted with design work for the nearby Wadsworth Atheneum, Austin created plans for a church building with a seating capacity of 850. At the time of its construction, St. John's reputedly had one of the tallest spires in New England. The Hartford Courant, quoting Chronicle of the Church, described the building as "a chaste and beautiful structure in the early pointed Gothic style, built of Chatham free stone..." and its interior as having a "chancel, with a massive rail, supported by mullions finished on either side." Additionally, "there are side galleries, with a convenient choir over the vestibule, in which is placed an organ of superior finish and tone." That first organ was Opus 47, consisting of two manuals and twenty-two stops, by E. and G. G. Hook Organ of Boston. In 1861, the first Hook organ was replaced by Opus 295 of two manuals and thirty stops by the same manufacturer.

As the years wore on, the church building began to show its age. The spire was eventually removed as the result of structural decay, the boiler became increasingly noisy, and finding space for the parish's many activities was becoming difficult. These, and other factors, figured into the parish's ultimate decision to build a new church in suburban West Hartford, Connecticut. The last services were held in the Austin edifice in 1907 and it was subsequently demolished. Many of the original St. John's furnishings, including its bell and, at first, its altar rail, pulpit and lectern would be utilized in the new St. John's Episcopal Church (West Hartford, Connecticut) building, designed by noted architect Bertram Grosvenor Goodhue.

== Notable people ==
Prominent parishioners of the church's Hartford years included Harriet Beecher Stowe, the author of Uncle Tom's Cabin, who purchased a pew at St. John's in 1864 and regularly attended Sunday services with her twin daughters Hattie and Eliza. At about the same time Mrs. Stowe became a member, Elizabeth Jarvis Colt, the wife of Colonel Samuel Colt, also joined. At the time, she was running Colt Firearms following her husband's recent death. Gideon Welles, President Abraham Lincoln's Secretary of the Navy, was also a congregant in the years following the American Civil War.

While in Hartford, St. John's had many notable clergy including Arthur Cleveland Coxe, St. John's first Rector (1842-1854), who later served as the second Bishop of the Episcopal Diocese of Western New York. During his tenure at St. John's, Coxe penned "Saviour, Sprinkle Many Nations", a hymn text later set to music by Arthur Sullivan. William Croswell Doane, who served as Rector from 1863 to 1867, eventually became the first Bishop of the Episcopal Diocese of Albany, New York. Doane, who is known to have later visited the Hartford area at least once during Mark Twain's years there, is the subject of a Twain anecdote set in that city. As reported in The Independent, after hearing one of Bishop Doane's sermons Twain informed him he had "a book at home which contains every word of it." Following Doane's protests, Twain "showed the clergyman an unabridged dictionary and said he 'stood ready to prove it'".

A number of talented musicians were affiliated with St. John's (Hartford) including organists and composers such as Dudley Buck and Henry Wellington Greatorex.
