= James E. Curry =

American bishop

The Right Reverend James Elliot Curry
- Suffragan Bishop of Connecticut
- Church: Episcopal Church
- Diocese: Connecticut
- Elected: 2000
- In office: 2000–2014

Orders
- Ordination: 1985
- Consecration: October 14, 2000 by Douglas E. Theuner

Personal details
- Born: July 15, 1948 (age 77)
- Denomination: Anglican
- Spouse: Kathleen McIntosh
- Children: 3

James Elliot Curry (born July 15, 1948) served as a suffragan bishop of the Episcopal Diocese of Connecticut from 2000 till 2014.

== Biography ==
Curry attended Amherst College from where he graduated with a Bachelor of Arts in religion in 1970. He then served as a consultant for Issues of Institutional Racism in Education and for Sex and Racial Equity in Education. Between 1972 and 1982 he also worked as an elementary school teacher at the Gateway Regional Schools in Huntington, Massachusetts. He also studied at the University of Massachusetts from where he earned a Master of Education in counseling in 1979. In 1985 he graduated with a Master of Divinity from Berkeley Divinity School at Yale University. He was ordained to the priesthood in 1985, and consecrated in October 2000. In 2006, he was awarded a Doctor of Divinity by Berkeley Divinity School.

Curry was ordained as a deacon and priest in 1985. He then became curate of Trinity Church in Torrington, Connecticut, while in 1988 he became rector of Trinity Church in Portland, Connecticut. In 1998, he was appointed as Canon to the Ordinary in the Diocese of Connecticut, a post he retained till 2000.

Curry was elected Suffragan Bishop of Connecticut in 2000 and was consecrated on October 14, 2000, by Bishop Douglas E. Theuner of New Hampshire. He retired in October 2014.

Episcopal Church (USA) titles
Preceded by Andrew Smith	Suffragan Bishop of Connecticut; October 14, 2000 – October 2014; With: Wilfrido Ramos-Orench; Laura J. Ahrens	Succeeded by Laura J. Ahrens
