= Eben Edwards Beardsley =

American Episcopal priest (1818–1892)

Eben Edwards Beardsley (January 8, 1818 – December 21, 1892) was a historian, writer and clergyman of the Episcopal Church in the United States of America.

== Biography ==
Born in Stepney, Connecticut, he graduated from Trinity College, Hartford and was ordained to the diaconate and priesthood by Thomas Church Brownell in 1835 and 1836 respectively. Beardsley served as rector of St. Thomas's Episcopal Church in New Haven from 1848 until his death, during which time he initiated extensive building programs and oversaw significant parochial growth. He was also the head of the Episcopal Academy of Connecticut.

Beardsley married poet Jane Margaret Matthews and they had one daughter, Elisabeth; Beardsley also had a nephew named William, who became rector of St. Thomas's after Beardsley's death.

Beardsley died in New Haven.

== Published works ==
- The Temple in Building: The Sermon at the Closing Services in St. Thomas' Chapel, New Haven, Sunday, March 12, 1854 (1854)
- Church and the Builders: A Sermon, Preached before the Seventy-sixth Annual Convention of the Diocese of Connecticut, in St. James' Church, New London, June 12th, 1860 (1860)
- A Commemorative Discourse, Delivered in St. Thomas Church, New Haven, the Sunday Following the Death of Bishop Brownell and Repeated in Trinity Church, by Request of the Rector, Sunday Evening, January 22d, 1865 (1865)
- Rubrics in the English and American Liturgies Compared: An Essay, Read before the Clergy of New Haven County, at Waterbury, Conn., November 3d, 1869 (1869)
- Life and Times of William Samuel Johnson, LL.D., first senator in Congress from Connecticut, and President of Columbia College, New York (1876)
- Privilege and Duty: The Sermon at the Re-consecration of St. Peter's Church, Cheshire, on the Feast of St. Matthias, 1876 (1876)
- History of the Episcopal Church in Connecticut from the Settlement of the Colony to the Death of Bishop Seabury.
- Life and Correspondence of Samuel Johnson, D.D. Missionary of the Church of England in Connecticut and First President of King's College, New York.
- The Rev. Jeremiah Leaming, D.D., His Life and Services (1885).
- Loving the Habitation of God's House: A Sermon Delivered at the Re-opening of St. Peter's Church, Cheshire, January 16, 1890 (1890)
- Foundation in the holy mountains: a sermon preached at the opening of Trinity Church, Newtown, Thursday, February 3, 1870
- Addresses and Discourses, Historical and Religious with A Paper on Bishop Berkeley.
- A Sketch of William Beardsley One of the Original settlers of Stratford, Conn. and a Record of His Descendants to the Third Generation and of Some Who Bear His Name to the Present Time.
