= Saint Paul's Rectory =

Historic house in Massachusetts, United States

- U.S. National Register of Historic Places
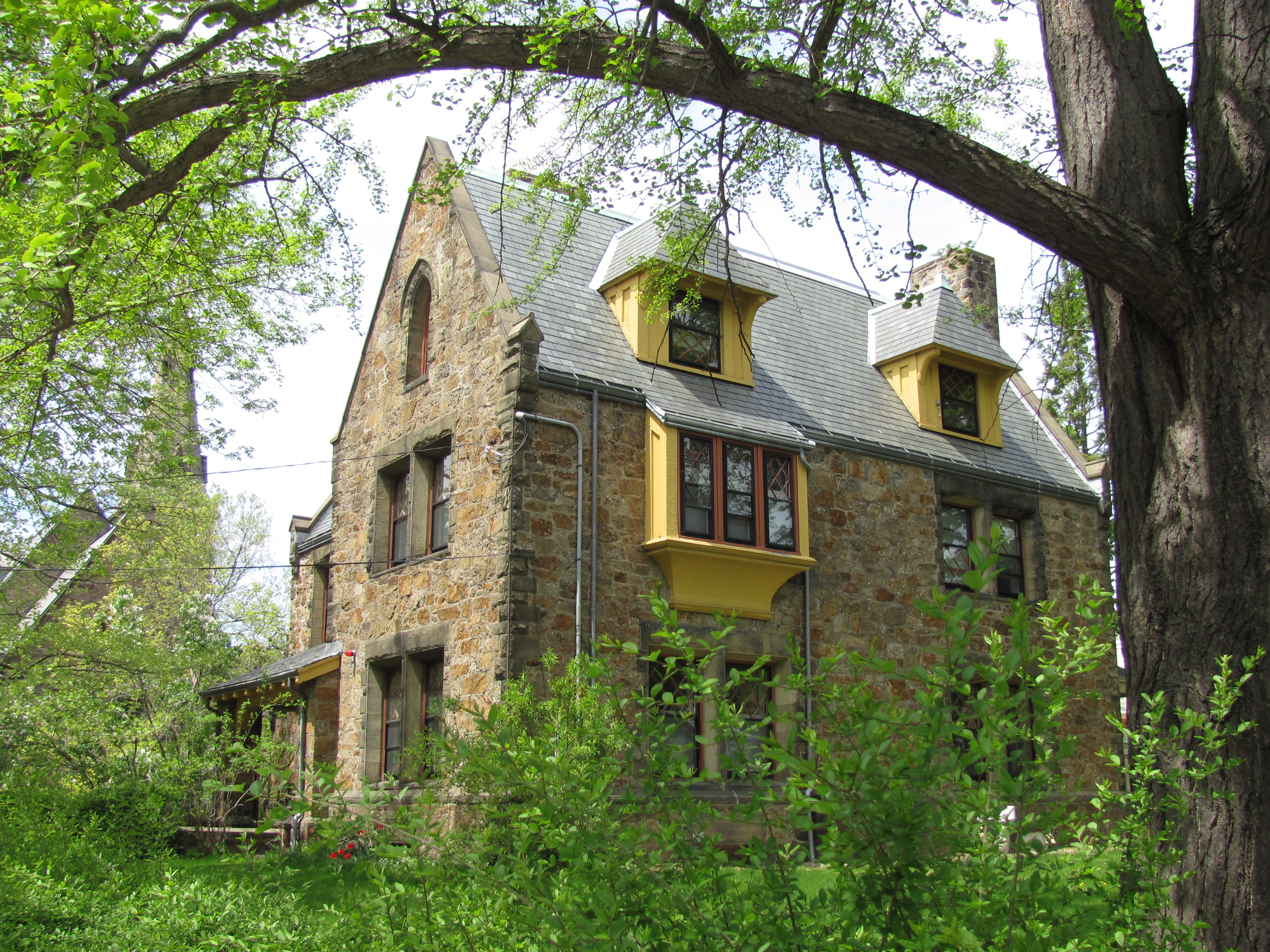
- Saint Paul's Rectory

- Location within Massachusetts Location within the United States
- Location: 130 Aspinwall Ave., Brookline, Massachusetts
- Coordinates: 42°20′46″N 71°7′6″W
- Built: 1886
- Architect: Peabody and Stearns
- Architectural style: Tudor Revival, Jacobethan Revival
- MPS: Brookline MRA
- NRHP reference No.: 85003313
- Added to NRHP: October 17, 1985

Saint Paul's Rectory is a historic church rectory at 130 Aspinwall Avenue in Brookline, Massachusetts. The 2 1/2-story Jacobethan stone house was built in 1886 to a design by Peabody and Stearns. It was designed to complement the Gothic Revival style of Saint Paul's Episcopal Church, for whose rector it was built. Construction funds were given in memory of Henry Savage Chase by his children. The exterior is finished in Brighton puddingstone and Nova Scotia freestone; its gable ends have elbows on the parapet walls, and the upper-level windows have diamond panes.

The house was listed on the National Register of Historic Places in 1985.

== See also ==
- National Register of Historic Places listings in Brookline, Massachusetts
