= Arthur E. Walmsley =

American Episcopal bishop (1928–2017)

The Right Reverend Arthur E. Walmsley
- Bishop of Connecticut
- Diocese: Connecticut
- In office: 1981–1993
- Predecessor: Morgan Porteus
- Successor: Clarence Coleridge

Orders
- Ordination: May 9, 1952 by Arthur C. Lichtenberger
- Consecration: October 27, 1979 by John Allin

Personal details
- Born: Arthur Edward Walmsley; May 4, 1928 New Bedford, Massachusetts, U.S.
- Died: October 5, 2017 (aged 89) Deering, New Hampshire, U.S.
- Denomination: Episcopalian
- Parents: Harry Barlow Walmsley & Elizabeth Doria Clegg
- Spouse: Roberta Walmsley
- Children: 2

Arthur Edward Walmsley (May 4, 1928 – October 5, 2017) was an Episcopal bishop, who served as diocesan bishop of Connecticut.

== Early life ==
Walmsley was born in New Bedford, Massachusetts. He was the son of Mr. and Mrs. Harry Barlow Walmsley of Ayer, Massachusetts.

He attended Trinity College in Hartford where he graduated with honors. There, he was a member of St. Anthony Hall and Phi Beta Kappa. He graduated cum laude from the Episcopal Theological School in 1951. He was made a deacon in 1951 and ordained priest in 1952 by the Rt. Rev. Arthur Lichtenberger, then of Missouri.

== Career ==
Following his ordination, Walmsley worked in St. Louis with inner city churches for seven years, including Trinity Episcopal Church and Church of the Ascension. In 1958, he began working as staff for three Presiding Bishops. He had various positions that dealt with social justice and racial reconciliation, including serving the executive secretary of the Division of Christina Citizenship of the Department of Social Relations for ten years. In the 1960s, he marched in Selma and Washington. He was also worked with the Episcopal Church Center in New York City. He was an architect of the Episcopal Society for Cultural and Racial Unity and the National Conference on Religion and Race.

Next, he served as the priest-in-charge at Grace Church, Amherst. Then, he was director of the Massachusetts Council of Churches. In 1972, he was named deputy to the rector of Trinity Parish in New York City. After just eighteen months, he became rector of St. Paul's Church in New Haven, Connecticut where he also served as president of the Downtown Cooperative Ministry.

Walmsley was elected Bishop Coadjutor of the Episcopal Church of Connecticut in 1979 and became the 12th Bishop Diocesan from 1981 to 1993. In this capacity, he helped advance the church's stance on race, immigrants, refugees, social ministry, and caring for people living with HIV/AIDS. He helped raise money for the diocesan summer camp, Camp Washington and conceived of converting the Church Home of Hartford into Seabury Retirement Community in Bloomfield. In 1984, he served on the Council of Advisors for the Order of Ascension.

After resigning, Walmsley co-founded Episcopalians for Global Reconciliation in 2005.

== Publications ==
He edited The Church in a Society of Abundance (Seabury Press, 1963) and the daily General Convention newspaper, Issues, in 1970, 1973, and 1976. He coordinated the Anglican Symposium on Mission Theology in 1984.

== Personal life ==
Walmsley married Roberta Brownell Chapin on December 29, 1959, in the Episcopal Church of the Ascension in St. Louis, Missouri. They had two children, Elizabeth and John. In 1961, the Walmselys purchased North Farm, a fourteen-acre farm in Deering, New Hampshire. Initially, the farm was their summer home, becoming a permanent residence when he retired in 1993. in 2007, the placed North Farm under a conservation easement with the Piscataquog Land Conservancy.

He served on the boards of the Deering Conservation Commission, Trinity College, Berkeley Divinity School at Yale, and Piscataquog Land Conservancy.

In 2017, he died at his home in Deering at the age of 89 years.

== See also ==
- List of bishops of the Episcopal Church in the United States of America

Episcopal Church (USA) titles
Preceded by Morgan Porteus	12th Bishop of Connecticut; 1981–1993	Succeeded by Clarence Coleridge
