= Emory F. Dyckman =

American politician

Emory F. Dyckman (December 19, 1877 – June 8, 1930) was an American lawyer and politician from New York.

== Life ==
Dyckman was born on December 19, 1877 in Davenport, New York.

Dyckman attended the Groton Academy and Union College. He then went to Albany Law School, graduating from there in 1902. He was admitted to the bar that year. He initially practiced law in Jefferson, but after his marriage he moved to Brooklyn and practiced law there. He also became prominent in Republican politics.

Dyckman lived in Flatbush. In 1925, he was elected to the New York State Assembly as a Republican, representing the Kings County 21st District. He served in the Assembly in 1926 and 1927. He lost the 1927 re-election to Democrat Joseph A. Esquirol. He again ran for the Assembly in 1928, only to again lose the election to Esquirol.

Dyckman was a vice chairman of the Brooklyn Bar Association, a vice president of the Kings Highway Savings Bank, and a member of the Brooklyn and Flatbush Chambers of Commerce, the Union League Club, the Flatbush Republican Club, and the Freemasons. He was married to Rhaylein Dalzell. They had two daughters, Elizabeth and Rhaylein.

Dyckman died from apoplexy in Cobleskill, where he was a guest of New York Supreme Court Justice Charles E. Nichols, on June 8, 1930. He was on his way to Saratoga Springs, where his daughter Rhaylein was to graduate from Skidmore College later that week, when he died. His funeral took place in the Flatbush Congregational Church and was led by the church's pastor Rev. Dr. William E. Dudley and its former pastor Rev. Dr. Lewis T. Reed. A number of city officials and representatives from various organizations attended the funeral. He was buried in Catskill.

New York State Assembly
Preceded by Walter F. Clayton	New York State Assembly; Kings County, 21st District; 1926–1927	Succeeded by Joseph A. Esquirol
