= Oak Lawn Cemetery =

Cemetery in Fairfield, Connecticut

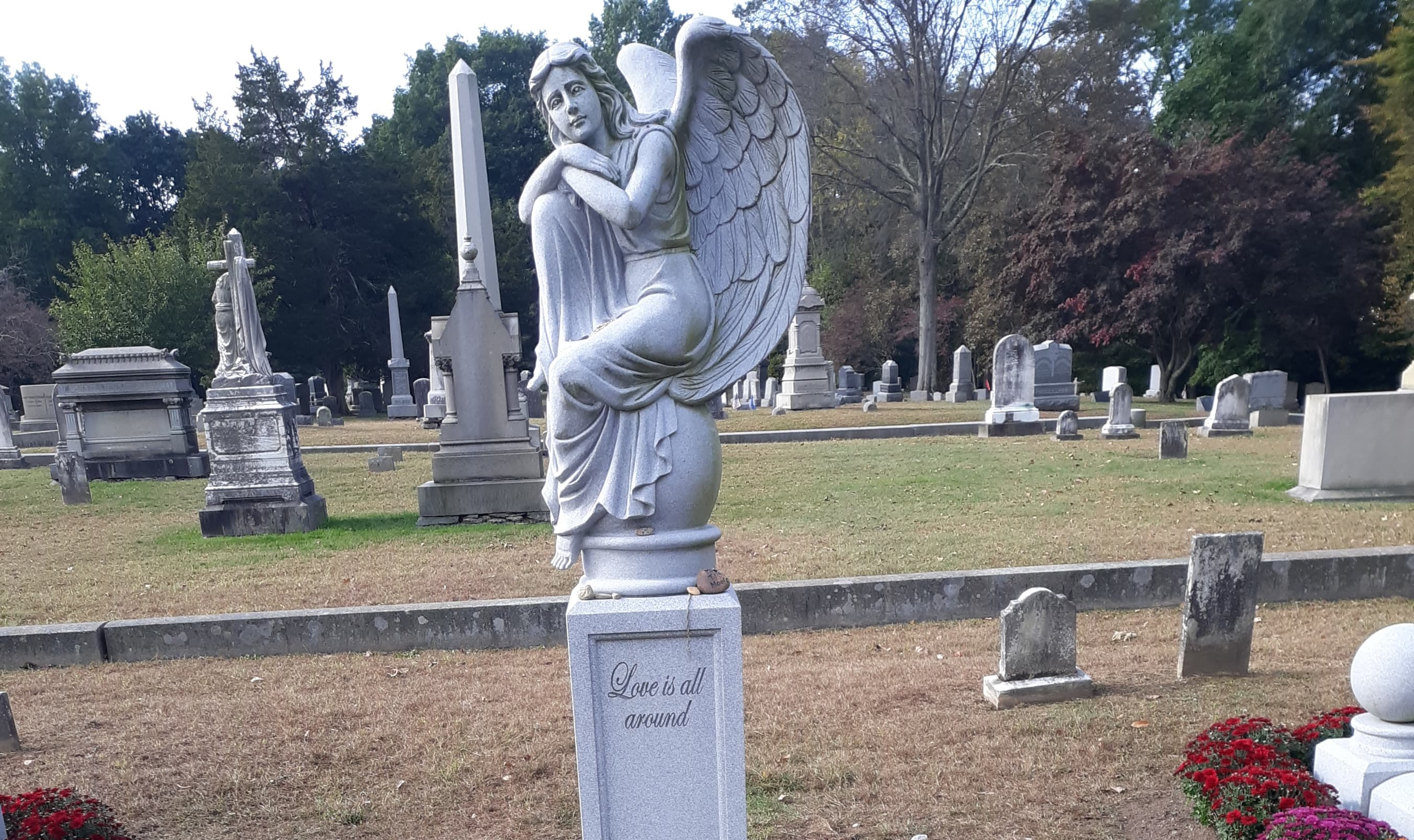
- Oak Lawn Cemetery, from Mary Tyler Moore's grave.

Details
- Established: 1865
- Location: 1530 Bronson Road, Fairfield, Connecticut
- Country: United States
- Coordinates: 41°09′50″N 73°16′26″W
- Size: <100 acres
- No. of interments: <10,000
- Website: https://www.oaklawnct.com/
- Find a Grave: Oak Lawn Cemetery

Oak Lawn Cemetery is a cemetery in Fairfield, Connecticut.

== History ==
In 1864, the Connecticut General Assembly authorized Captain Jonathan Godfrey to purchase twelve acres near Bronson Road for "no more than $12,000". On December 29, 1865, the Oak Lawn Cemetery Association was incorporated. The oak was regarded as a symbol of immortality in the 19th century and there was a white oak tree across the street from the parcel at Bronson Street. Captain Edwn Sherwood served as the first president of the Oak Lawn Cemetery Association from 1865 to September 1886.

Sturges Ogden was charged with the care of the white oak in 1818. The David Ogden House was renovated in 1935 and opened to visitors to the cemetery.

In 1866, sixteen people were buried at Oak Lawn. In 1867, 46 people were buried. More than half of the first 170 burials were transferred from the West Burying Ground. As of 1881, there were 435 burials at Oak Lawn.

As of May 2006, Oak Lawn Cemetery includes the remains of "nearly 10,000 people" and was "almost one hundred acres". As of 2015, the cemetery had over 1,200 veterans remains.

In 2021, a memorial of two granite towers on top of a pentagon granite structure was built in honor of 9/11 victims.

== Notable burials ==
- Hugh D. Auchincloss Sr. (1858–1913), merchant and businessman
- Frederic Bronson (1851–1900), lawyer
- Mario Dal Fabbro (1913–1990), sculptor, furniture designer, and author
- Michael J. Daly (1924–2008), U.S. Army officer and Medal of Honor recipient
- Charles I. DeBevoise (1872–1958), U.S. Army officer and Distinguished Service Medal recipient
- John H. Esquirol (1900–1970), bishop of Episcopal Diocese of Connecticut
- Mary Tyler Moore (1936–2017), American actress
- Jason Robards (1922–2000), American actor
- James C. Shannon (1896–1980), judge and governor of Connecticut
- Franco Ventriglia (1922–2012), opera singer
- Mabel Osgood Wright (1859–1934), American author

== See also ==
- List of cemeteries in Connecticut
