= Charles I. DeBevoise =

United States Army general (1872–1958)

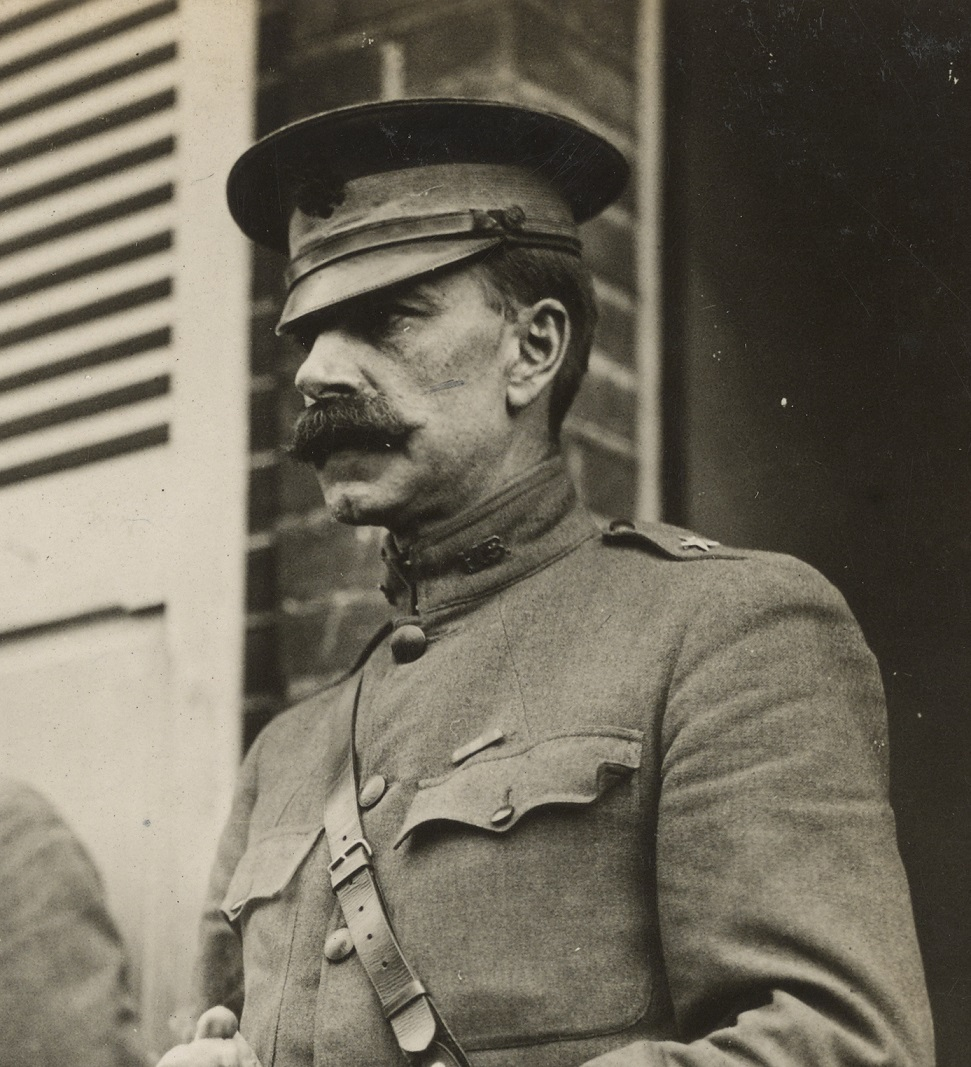
- DeBevoise as commander of 53rd Brigade, 27th Division in France in 1918
- Born: October 17, 1872; Brooklyn, New York City
- Died: December 10, 1958 (aged 86); Glen Cove, New York
- Burial place: Oak Lawn Cemetery; Fairfield, Connecticut, U.S.
- Spouse(s): Sarah Fiske Pilcher (1899–1916, her death); Florens Hutchins (1926–1951, her death)
- Children: 2
- Military career
- Allegiance: United States
- Branch: United States Army
- Rank: Brigadier General
- Wars: World War I
- Awards: Distinguished Service Medal

Charles I. DeBevoise (October 17, 1872 – December 10, 1958) was a United States Army officer in the early 20th century, who was awarded the Distinguished Service Medal.

== Early life and education ==
DeBevoise was born in Brooklyn on October 17, 1872, the son of Isaac C. Debevoise and Caroline A. (Schenck) Debevoise. He attended the schools of Brooklyn and Brooklyn Polytechnic Preparatory School, then began attendance at Yale College. He graduated in 1894 and began a career as a stockbroker, first with the firm of Dudley Brothers, and later with Foster and Lounsberry.

== Military career ==
He served in several military positions, including in the New York Army National Guard commanding the trains, as well as the commander the 107th Infantry Regiment. Between 1918 and 1919, DeBevoise commanded the 53rd Infantry Brigade of the 27th Division, and he received the Army Distinguished Service Medal. The citation for his medal reads:

The President of the United States of America, authorized by Act of Congress, July 9, 1918, takes pleasure in presenting the Army Distinguished Service Medal to Brigadier General Charles I. De Bevoise, United States Army, for exceptionally meritorious and distinguished services to the Government of the United States, in a duty of great responsibility during World War I. General De Bevoise served with credit as Commander of Trains and Military Police of the 27th Division. Later, in Command of the 107th Infantry, 27th Division, he proved himself to be an energetic and resourceful leader during the operations against the Hindenburg line and those on the Le Selle River. After being promoted to Brigadier General he continued to render valuable services to the American Expeditionary Forces as Commander of the 53d Infantry Brigade, rendering conspicuous services to the American Expeditionary Forces.

He received a promotion to brigadier general after service on the Hindenburg Line.

Between 1954 and 1958, DeBevoise was a member of the National Horse Show Foundation.

== Death and burial ==
He died on December 10, 1958. DeBevoise is buried in Section M Lot 221 of Oak Lawn Cemetery in Fairfield, Connecticut.

== Family ==
Debevoise married Sarah Fiske Pilcher in Brooklyn on November 1, 1899. They were the parents of two daughters, Carol (b. 1901) and Martha (b. 1903). Sarah Pilcher Debevoise died on February 2, 1916. In 1926, Debevoise married Florens Hutchins (1886–1951), who had previously been married to Frederic Elliott Lewis, the owner of the ranch where the city of Diamond Bar, California is now located.

== Bibliography ==
=== Books ===
- Davis, Henry Blaine Jr. (1998). Generals in Khaki. Raleigh, North Carolina: Pentland Press. ISBN 1571970886. OCLC 40298151.
- Dwight, Frederick, ed. (1922). Quarter-century Record, Class of 1894 Yale College. New Haven, CT: Yale College – via Google Books.
- O'Ryan, John F. (1921). The Story of the 27th Division. New York: Wynkoop Hallenbeck Crawford co. OCLC 2354198.

=== Internet ===
- Oak Lawn Cemetery Association (October 7, 2017). "Oak Lawn Cemetery, Fairfield, Fairfield County, Connecticut: Surnames C–E". Interment.net. Dripping Springs, TX: Clear Digital Media.
