= Saint Paul's Church, Chapel, and Parish House =

Historic church in Massachusetts, United States

- U.S. National Register of Historic Places
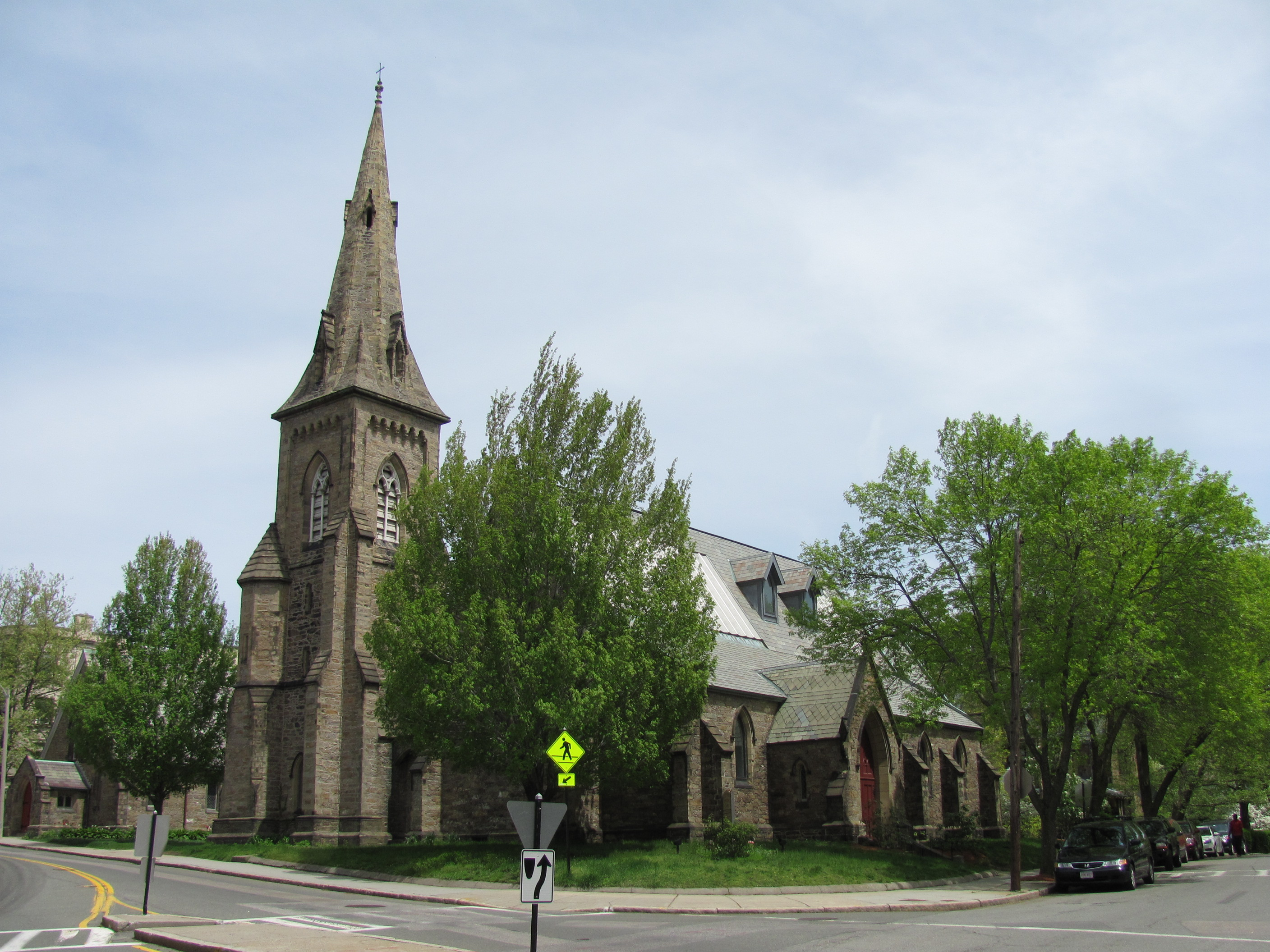
- Saint Paul's Church

- Location within Massachusetts Location within the United States
- Location: 15 and 27 Saint Paul St. and 104 Aspinwall Ave., Brookline, Massachusetts
- Coordinates: 42°20′46″N 71°7′8″W
- Area: less than one acre
- Built: 1851
- Architect: Upjohn, Richard; Schweinfurth, Julius
- Architectural style: Gothic
- MPS: Brookline MRA
- NRHP reference No.: 85003312
- Added to NRHP: October 17, 1985

Saint Paul's Church, Chapel, and Parish House are a historic Episcopal Church complex at 15 and 27 Saint Paul Street and 104 Aspinwall Avenue in Brookline, Massachusetts. The Gothic Revival church building was designed by Richard Upjohn and built in 1851-52, and is the oldest surviving religious building in the town. The complex was listed on the National Register of Historic Places in 1985.

== Description and history ==
The Saint Paul's Church complex stands at the junction of Saint Paul Street and Aspinwall Avenue in eastern Brookline, roughly halfway between the commercial centers of Coolidge Corner and Brookline Village. The church is a basically rectangular structure, oriented with its long access east-west, with a tower projecting from the northwest corner. Its main entrance is on the long southern facade, near the western end, set in a Gothic-arched opening in a projecting section with a steep gabled roof. The building's walls are puddingstone, and the main roof, also gabled, is made of polychrome slate. The building exhibits classic elements of the Gothic Revival, including lancet-arched windows, tripartite windows with tracery, and elaborate stonework in the tower.

The Episcopalian congregation for which it was built was established in 1849 by William and Augustus Aspinwall (the latter donating the land on which the church was built). Richard Upjohn was retained in 1850 to design the building, which was completed two years later. The chapel, also an Upjohn design, was built in 1858 and enlarged in 1880 to a design by Peabody and Stearns. The parish house was designed by Julius Schweinfurth and built in 1895. The church was gutted by fire in 1976 and was rebuilt in 1979-80. The church is the oldest religious building in Brookline.

== Current status ==
St. Paul's Episcopal Church serves Brookline, nearby Boston, Massachusetts and surrounding areas and is an active parish in the Episcopal Diocese of Massachusetts. It holds two regular services on Sunday mornings and is well-known for its ministry to children and young adults, strong choral music program, and multiple ministry initiatives outside the parish. Its current rector is the Reverend Doctor Won-Jae Hur, who followed the Reverend Doctor Paul Kolbet, who succeeded the Right Reverend Jeffrey Mello.

== See also ==
- Saint Paul's Rectory
- National Register of Historic Places listings in Brookline, Massachusetts
