= Franco Ventriglia =

American opera singer (1922–2012)

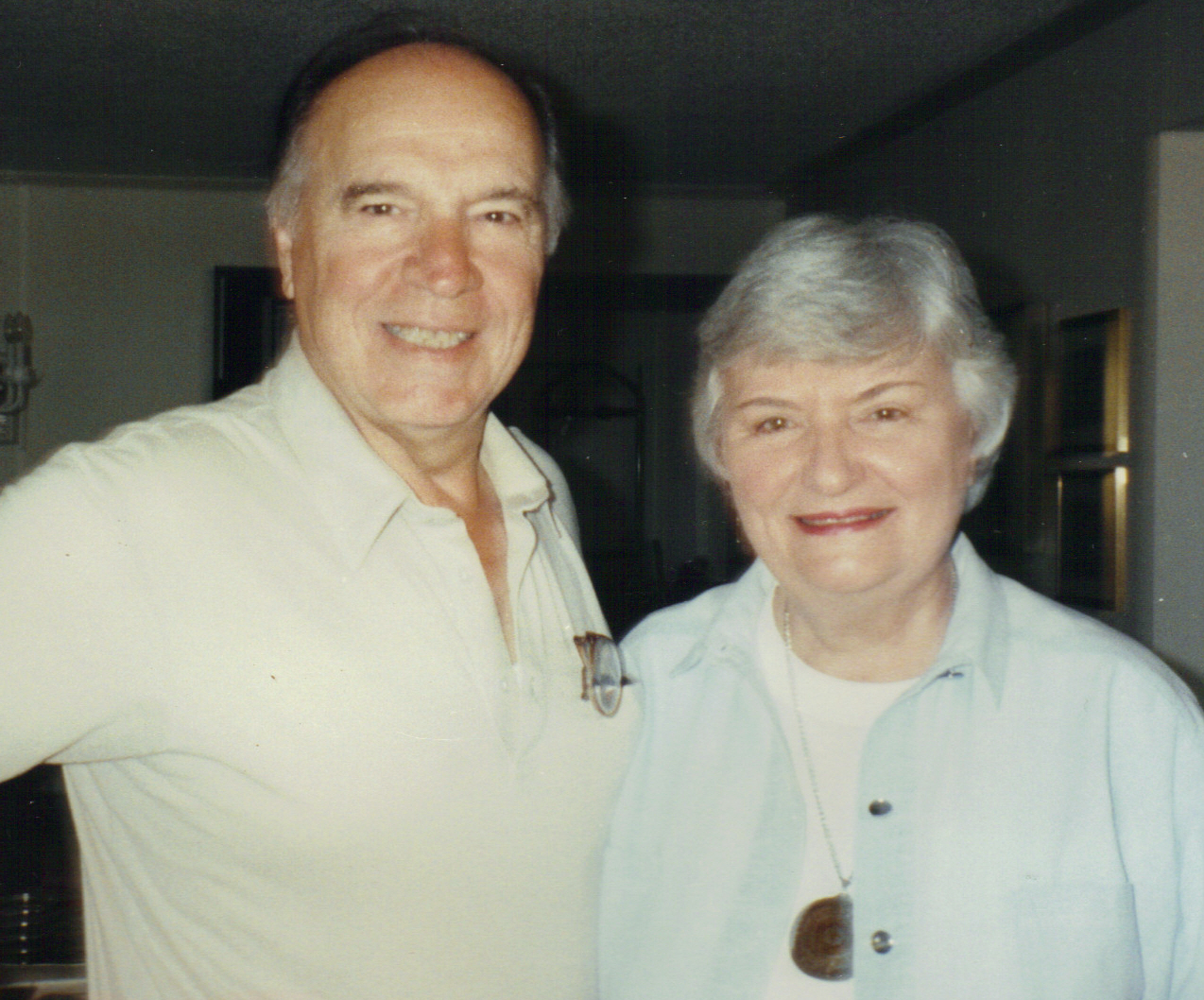
- Franco and Jean Ventriglia in 2007
- Born: Francis Ventriglia; October 20, 1922; Fairfield, Connecticut, U.S.
- Died: November 28, 2012 (aged 90); Wallingford, Connecticut, U.S.
- Resting place: Oak Lawn Cemetery; Fairfield, Connecticut, U.S.
- Education: ATW's Professional School
- Occupation: Opera singer (bass)
- Years active: 1954–2001
- Spouse: Jean Armstrong Ventriglia

Franco Ventriglia (October 20, 1922 – November 28, 2012) was an opera singer who sang bass in every major European opera house during the 1950s, 1960s, and 1970s. He returned to the U.S. in 1978, where he continued to perform at venues including Carnegie Hall, and traveled to perform in southeast Asia, until his retirement in 2001 at age 79.

== Biography ==
Franco Ventriglia was born on October 20, 1922, in Fairfield, Connecticut, to Rosa and Salvatore Ventriglia. He grew up on a vegetable farm and graduated from Roger Ludlowe High School in Fairfield in 1941. He enlisted in the Marine Corps, serving in the 1st Marine Aircraft Wing in the South Pacific during World War II. After returning from the war, he was working at his brother's filling station in Easton, Connecticut, when Mario Pagano, a maestro de Canto at the American Theatre Wing Professional School heard from one of Ventriglia's coworkers about his singing talent. Ventriglia passed an audition and went on to attend the school on the G.I. Bill, crossing paths with classmate Marlon Brando, among others.

== Singing career ==
Ventriglia worked as an inspector at Sikorsky Aircraft in Stratford, Connecticut, and sang in local concerts. After attending a few of Ventriglia's concerts in Bridgeport, Connecticut, Igor Sikorsky, a music lover, granted Ventriglia permission to take one day off from work each week to continue his voice studies in New York City.

After Pagano's death, Ventriglia and his wife Jean boarded the ocean liner SS Constitution for Italy. On board, after singing Ol' Man River for a group in first class, he met a businessman who asked him to contact Toti Dal Monte, a great coloratura soprano who also taught voice in Rome. Ventriglia took singing lessons from Dal Monte and eventually made his operatic debut in Palermo, singing in the Die Meistersinger von Nürnberg. He later sang with Luciano Pavarotti in La bohème and Rigoletto. He performed in Samson and Delilah at La Scala, a performance he considered the highlight of his career.

== Later life and death ==
Ventriglia's last concert was at the age of 79.

Ventriglia died on November 28, 2012. He was buried at Oak Lawn Cemetery in Fairfield.

== External links and sources ==
- Media related to Franco Ventriglia at Wikimedia Commons
- Record-Journal.com interview with Franco Ventriglia
- Successful opera career was destiny, a December 2004 article from a Connecticut newspaper
- Recordings by Franco Ventriglia from Amazon.com
- "Franco Ventriglia Obituary". Connecticut Post via Legacy.com. November 30 – December 5, 2012.
