= Edward Campion Acheson =

English bishop

The Right Reverend Edward Campion Acheson
- Bishop of Connecticut
- Church: Episcopal Church
- Diocese: Connecticut
- In office: 1928–1934
- Predecessor: Chauncey B. Brewster
- Successor: Frederick G. Budlong
- Previous posts: Suffragan Bishop of Connecticut (1915-1926); Coadjutor Bishop of Connecticut (1926-1928)

Orders
- Ordination: July 14, 1889 by Arthur Sweatman
- Consecration: November 4, 1915 by Chauncey B. Brewster

Personal details
- Born: April 7, 1858 Woolwich, Kent, England
- Died: January 28, 1934 (aged 75) Middletown, Connecticut, United States
- Buried: Pine Grove Cemetery, Middletown
- Denomination: Anglican
- Parents: Alexander Acheson & Mary Campion
- Spouse: Eleanor G. Gooderham
- Children: 3

Edward Campion Acheson (April 7, 1858 – January 28, 1934) was sixth bishop of the Episcopal Diocese of Connecticut, serving as suffragan from 1915 to 1926; and coadjutor from 1926 to 1928. He was diocesan bishop from 1928 to 1934. Bishop Acheson became a naturalized citizen of the United States in 1894.

Acheson was a member of St. John's Lodge, Free and Accepted Masons, of Middletown, and served as Chaplain of the Grand Lodge of Connecticut. He was also a trustee of the Berkeley Divinity School and the Ridgefield School of Ridgefield, Connecticut.

== Early life and education ==
Acheson was born on April 7, 1858, in Woolwich, Kent in England, the son of Alexander Acheson and Mary Campion. He moved to Canada in 1881 settling in Toronto where he served with The Queen's Own Rifles of Canada and served in the North-West Rebellion in 1885. He studied for the priesthood at Wycliffe College and graduated in 1889, after which he moved to the United States. He also received a Master of Arts from New York University in 1892 and earned a Doctor of Sacred Theology from Trinity College in 1916. He was also granted a Doctor of Divinity from Wesleyan University and Berkeley Divinity School in 1916 and from Wycliffe College in 1917, respectively.

== Ordination ==
Acheson was ordained deacon on June 10, 1888, and priest on July 14, 1889, in the Anglican Church of Canada. He served his diaconate as curate at All Saints Church in Toronto. After ordination to the priesthood and after settling in the United States, he became assistant minister at St. George's Church in New York City. In 1892 he became rector of Holy Trinity Church in Middletown, Connecticut.

== Bishop ==
In 1915, Acheson was elected Suffragan Bishop of Connecticut. He was consecrated on November 4, 1915, by the Bishop of Connecticut Chauncey B. Brewster in the Church of the Holy Trinity in Middletown, Connecticut. In 1926, he was elected Coadjutor Bishop of Connecticut and succeeded as diocesan bishop on November 16, 1928.

During the First World War, Acheson served with the Red Cross and later as a Chaplain in the Twenty-Sixth Division. In 1933, he served as Chaplain of the Constitutional Convention at which Connecticut ratified the Twenty-first Amendment to the United States Constitution.

== Family ==
Acheson married Eleanor G. Gooderham, granddaughter of William Gooderham Sr., on June 8, 1892, in Toronto, and together had three children: Dean, Margaret, and Edward Jr. Dean Acheson became a lawyer and politician, eventually serving as the Secretary of State from 1949 to 1953.

== See also ==
- List of bishops of the Episcopal Church in the United States of America

Episcopal Church (USA) titles
Preceded by Chauncey B. Brewster	6th Bishop of Connecticut; 1928–1934	Succeeded by Frederick G. Budlong
