= Joseph A. Esquirol =

American politician

Joseph Alfred Esquirol (January 22, 1898 – September 1981) was an American lawyer and politician from New York.

== Life ==
He was born on January 22, 1898, in Brooklyn, New York City, the son of Assemblyman Joseph H. Esquirol (c.1867–1944) and Grace Ella (Alfred) Esquirol (died 1926). He graduated from New York University in 1917. During World War I, Esquirol was a Student Officer in the U.S. Naval Aviation. He married Louise E. Downs.

Esquirol was a member of the New York State Assembly (Kings Co., 21st D.) in 1928, 1929, 1930, 1931 and 1932.

He was a member of the New York State Senate (8th D.) from 1933 to 1942, sitting in the 156th, 157th, 158th, 159th, 160th, 161st, 162nd and 163rd New York State Legislatures.

On June 16, 1942, a special grand jury recommended the disbarment of Esquirol for connections with the pinball racket, getting money for legislative appointments and misusing clients' funds. His trial began on December 4, 1942, before Official Referee Leander B. Faber. On September 20, 1943, Faber recommended disbarment, but on December 29, 1943, the Appellate Division decided on a five-year suspension of Esquirol's law license.

On December 31, 1954, Esquirol was disbarred by the Appellate Division for professional misconduct.

He died in September 1981.

Bishop John H. Esquirol (1900–1970) was his brother.

== Sources ==
New York State Assembly
Preceded by Emory F. Dyckman	New York State Assembly; Kings County, 21st District; 1928–1932	Succeeded by Charles H. Breitbart
New York State Senate
Preceded by William L. Love	New York State Senate; 8th District; 1933–1942	Succeeded by Samuel L. Greenberg
