= Ian Douglas (bishop) =

The Right Reverend Ian Douglas
- Bishop of Connecticut
- Church: Episcopal Church
- Diocese: Connecticut
- Elected: October 24, 2009
- In office: 2010–2022
- Predecessor: Andrew Smith
- Successor: Jeffrey Mello

Orders
- Ordination: June 24, 1989
- Consecration: April 17, 2010 by Katharine Jefferts Schori

Personal details
- Born: May 20, 1958 (age 68) Fitchburg, Massachusetts, United States
- Denomination: Anglican
- Spouse: Kristin Harris
- Children: 3

Ian Theodore Douglas (born May 20, 1958) is the former bishop of the Episcopal Church in Connecticut.

== Biography ==
He was ordained to the diaconate on June 11, 1988, and to the priesthood on June 24, 1989. He was elected fifteenth Bishop of the Episcopal Church in Connecticut on October 24, 2009. His election marked the first time in the diocese's 224-year history that a priest from outside the diocese was elected bishop. He was consecrated on April 17, 2010. He was previously Angus Dun Professor of Mission and World Christianity at Episcopal Divinity School in Cambridge, Massachusetts. He also served as priest associate at St. James's Episcopal Church in Cambridge, Massachusetts from 1989 to 2010. Douglas earned degrees from Middlebury College (B.A.), Harvard University Graduate School of Education (Ed.M.), Harvard Divinity School (M.Div.) and Boston University (Ph.D.). Douglas is married to Kristin Harris. They are the parents of Luke, Timothy, and Johanna.

Douglas is a member of the Standing Committee of the Anglican Communion. He is also Vice-Chair of Episcopalians for Global Reconciliation.

In 2015, Douglas was one of the candidates for election as the 27th Presiding Bishop of The Episcopal Church.

In April 2021, Douglas announced his plan to retire in fall 2022. Effective February 1, 2026, he was an assisting bishop in the Episcopal Diocese of Massachusetts.

== Bibliography ==
- Fling Out the Banner: The National Church Ideal and the Foreign Mission of the Episcopal Church (Church Hymnal, 1996) ISBN 9780898692457
- editor, Beyond Colonial Anglicanism: The Anglican Communion in the Twenty-First Century (New York: Church Publishing, 2000) ISBN 9780898693577
- with Paul Zahl, Understanding the Windsor Report: Two Leaders in the American Church Speak Across the Divide (New York: Church Publishing, 2005) ISBN 9780898694871
- contributor, I Have Called You Friends: Reflections on Reconciliation in Honor of Frank T. Griswold (Cowley Publications, 2006) ISBN 9781561012480
- contributor, What We Shall Become: The Future and Structure of the Episcopal Church (New York: Church Publishing, 2013) ISBN 9780898698954
- editor, Living Postcolonial Anglicanism: Prospects for a Polycentric Anglican Communion, Postcolonial and Decolonial Studies in Religion and Theology (T&T Clark, 2025) ISBN 9781666979978

== See also ==
- List of Episcopal bishops of the United States
- Historical list of the Episcopal bishops of the United States

Episcopal Church (USA) titles
Preceded by Andrew Smith	15th Bishop of Connecticut; 2010−2022	Succeeded by Jeffrey Mello
