= Jeffrey Mello =

XVI Bishop of Connecticut

Bishop Mello in 2026

The Rt. Rev. Jeffrey William Mello is an American Episcopal clergyman who has served as 16th Bishop of Connecticut since 2022.

== Early life and education ==
Born and raised in Cranston, Rhode Island, Mello obtained a Bachelor's degree from Rhode Island College in 1991 and a Master's degree in social work from Simmons University in Boston, Massachusetts, in 2000. After working as a clinical social worker in the addiction psychiatry unit of Massachusetts General Hospital for several years, he studied for a master's degree in divinity at Episcopal Divinity School in Cambridge, Massachusetts, which he was awarded in 2007.

== Career ==
Mello was ordained a deacon on June 2, 2007, and a priest on January 12, 2008. After serving as associate rector of Christ Church, Cambridge, for two years, he was appointed rector of St. Paul's Church in Brookline, Massachusetts, in 2009. From 2008 to 2017 he was also an adjunct professor at Episcopal Divinity School.

In May 2022 Mello was elected Bishop of Connecticut and consecrated on 15 October 2022.

== Controversies ==
=== St. Paul's Church disciplinary dispute ===
Mello faced criticism over his handling of clergy disciplinary proceedings at St. Paul's Episcopal Church in Shelton, Connecticut, which culminated in the congregation's declaration that it was leaving the diocese. The dispute involved allegations of racial discrimination, prolonged disciplinary proceedings, and financial hardship for the parish. In January 2024, following several years of unresolved complaints against the rector, the Rev. Amjad Samuel, parishioners voted to disassociate themselves from the Episcopal Church in Connecticut. In a letter to Mello, the congregation accused diocesan authorities of mistreatment and expressed a complete loss of confidence in their leadership. Samuel denied the disciplinary allegations against him, describing them as false and attributing them to racism. Mello responded that the resignation of the parish vestry and depletion of its funds had made it impossible for the congregation to continue employing a priest.

In May 2024, Mello affirmed a determination by the diocesan Standing Committee that Samuel had abandoned the Episcopal Church. On July 10, Mello formally deposed Samuel from ordained ministry, stating that Samuel had failed to retract or deny the acts constituting abandonment within the prescribed 60-day period. The deposition ended the earlier disciplinary proceedings against Samuel without their reaching a final determination. Mello acknowledged the difficulties experienced by the parish and called for further examination of the diocese's implementation of clergy disciplinary procedures.

=== Political involvement ===
Mello has taken public positions on politically and theologically divisive issues, including same-sex relationships, immigration enforcement, and the Israeli–Palestinian conflict. In June 2025, he and suffragan bishop Laura Ahrens issued a joint statement entitled "Because Silence = Death", condemning Israeli military operations in Gaza and United States immigration enforcement policies while advocating support for gay and transsexual people. The statement characterized public opposition to these policies as a Christian obligation, arguing that remaining silent in the face of injustice was incompatible with the church's baptismal commitments.

=== Alleged mistreatment of traditionalist clergy ===
Mello has faced allegations that his administration used ecclesiastical disciplinary procedures to marginalize theologically conservative clergy within the Episcopal Church in Connecticut. In June 2024, the diocese suspended the Rev. Ian Montgomery, a traditionalist Anglican priest who had served as priest-in-charge of St. Saviour's Church in Old Greenwich. The suspension, effective June 1, was recorded in the diocese's official journal. The 2026 documentary All Are Not Welcome: The Downfall of the Episcopal Church and How to Reform Her, alleges that under Mello, traditionalist clergy had experienced informal blacklisting, interference with parish appointments, and misuse of Title IV disciplinary proceedings. The documentary presented these allegations as part of a broader critique of the Episcopal Church's treatment of clergy who uphold traditional Anglican doctrine.

== Family ==
Mello's husband, Paul, is the founder and artistic director of a theater company in Boston and teaches at the Boston Conservatory at Berklee College of Music. They have one son.

Episcopal Church (USA) titles
Preceded by Ian Douglas	16th Bishop of Connecticut; 2022−present	Succeeded by Incumbent
