= Walter H. Gray =

American bishop

The Right Reverend Walter Henry Gray
- Bishop of Connecticut
- Church: Episcopal Church
- Diocese: Connecticut
- In office: 1951–1969
- Predecessor: Frederick G. Budlong
- Successor: John H. Esquirol
- Previous posts: Suffragan Bishop of Connecticut (1940-1945); Coadjutor Bishop of Connecticut (1945-1951)

Orders
- Ordination: February 17, 1929
- Consecration: November 12, 1940 by Henry St. George Tucker

Personal details
- Born: August 20, 1898 Richmond, Virginia, United States
- Died: December 4, 1973 (aged 75) Hartford, Connecticut, United States
- Denomination: Anglican
- Parents: William Cole Gray & Irena Hanswood Talley
- Spouse: Virginia Stuart Hutchinson

Walter Henry Gray (August 20, 1898 – December 4, 1973) was bishop of the Episcopal Diocese of Connecticut from 1951 to 1969. He had served previously as suffragan from 1940 to 1945 and coadjutor from 1945 to 1951.

== Early life and education ==
Gray was born on August 20, 1898, in Richmond, Virginia, the son of William Cole Gray and Irena Hanswood Talley. He served in the US Army during World War I. After the war he studied at the College of William & Mary and the Law School of the University of Richmond, after which he was admitted to the Virginia State Bar in 1925. In 1928 he graduated with a Bachelor of Divinity from the Virginia Theological Seminary.

== Career ==
=== Priest ===
Gray was made deacon on June 8, 1928, and ordained priest on February 17, 1929. He served as assistant rector of St John's Church in West Hartford, Connecticut, from 1928 till 1932. Later, in 1932, he became Dean of the Pro-Cathedral of the Nativity in Bethlehem, Pennsylvania. In 1937, he transferred to Hartford, Connecticut, to become Dean of Christ Church Cathedral.

=== Bishop ===
Gray was elected Suffragan Bishop of Connecticut in 1940. He was consecrated on November 12, 1940, by Presiding Bishop Henry St. George Tucker. He was elected Bishop Coadjutor on October 2, 1945, and became succeeded as Bishop of Connecticut on January 15, 1951. As Bishop of Connecticut he was involved in the Interracial Commission and Interfaith Housing. He was also a prominent leader of the 1948, 1958, and 1968 Lambeth Conferences. He is the author of the "Gray Report" on overseas missions. Gray retired on August 30, 1969. He died a few years later on December 4, 1973, in Hartford, Connecticut.

== See also ==
- List of bishops of the Episcopal Church in the United States of America

Episcopal Church (USA) titles
Preceded by Frederick G. Budlong	8th Bishop of Connecticut; 1951–1969	Succeeded by John H. Esquirol
