= Eli Whitney (disambiguation) =

Eli Whitney (1765–1825) was an American inventor and entrepreneur, best known for his cotton gin and his advocacy for interchangeable parts in manufacturing.

Eli Whitney may also refer to:

- Eli Whitney III (1820–1825, known as Eli Whitney Jr.), son of the inventor, maker of the Colt Walker revolver
- The Eli Whitney Museum in Connecticut, U.S.
- Eli Whitney, North Carolina, U.S., an unincorporated community
- Eli Whitney Technical High School, a technical high school located in Hamden, Connecticut

== See also ==
- Eli Whitney Blake (1795–1886), inventor, nephew of Eli Whitney
- Eli Whitney Blake, Jr., (1836–1895), scientist, grand-nephew of Eli Whitney
- Eli Whitney Debevoise (1899–1990), American lawyer
- Eli Whitney Debevoise II (born 1953), American former executive director
- The Eli Whitney Students Program at Yale College
- Elisha J. Whitney, a character in the Cole Porter musical Anything Goes
