= Frederick G. Budlong =

American bishop (1881–1953)

The Right Reverend Frederick Grandy Budlong
- Bishop of Connecticut
- Church: Episcopal Church
- Diocese: Connecticut
- In office: 1934–1951
- Predecessor: Edward Campion Acheson
- Successor: Walter H. Gray
- Previous post: Coadjutor Bishop of Connecticut (1931-1934)

Orders
- Ordination: December 1907 by Samuel Cook Edsall
- Consecration: December 16, 1931 by James De Wolf Perry

Personal details
- Born: July 10, 1881 Camden, New York, United States
- Died: September 25, 1953 (aged 72) West Hartford, Connecticut, United States
- Buried: Sunset Hill Cemetery, Clinton, New York
- Denomination: Anglican
- Parents: The Rev. Frank Dorr Budlong & Sarah Elizabeth Hale Grandy
- Spouse: Mary Elizabeth Corbett; Kathleen Faulconer Kelly

Frederick Grandy Budlong (July 10, 1881 – September 25, 1953) was bishop of the Episcopal Diocese of Connecticut from 1934 to 1951. Born in Camden, New York, he died in Hartford, Connecticut.

== Early life and education ==
Budlong was born on July 10, 1881, in Camden, New York, the son of the Rev. Frank Dorr Budlong and Sarah Elizabeth Hale Grandy. In 1900 he graduated from Shattuck-Saint Mary's, in Faribault, Minnesota. He also studied at the Hobart College from where he graduated with a Bachelor of Arts in 1904. He undertook theological studies at the General Theological Seminary and graduated in 1907. He was awarded a Doctor of Sacred Theology from Hobart in 1920 and from General Theological Seminary in 1932. he was also granted a Doctor of Divinity from the University of Pittsburgh in 1921 and another from Trinity College in 1932.

== Priesthood ==
Budlong was ordained deacon in June 1907 and priest in December of the same year, both by Bishop Samuel Cook Edsall of Minnesota. Between 1907 and 1909 he served as curate the Church of St John the Evangelist in Saint Paul, Minnesota. In 1909 he became rector of Christ Church in Saint Paul, Minnesota and in 1912, rector of Christ Church in Winnetka, Illinois. From 1916 till 1921 he was rector of St Peter's Church in Chicago. In 1915 he also became the first principal of the Diocesan School of Religious Instruction in Chicago. Later, in 1921, he became rector of the Church of the Ascension in Pittsburgh, Pennsylvania. He also served as rector of Christ Church in Greenwich, Connecticut between 1925 and 1931, a position described at the time as "a pleasantly middle-of-the-road-ish parish; a salary of $12,000 a year; a large residence; an automobile; an impressive socialite congregation."

== Bishop ==
Budlong was elected Coadjutor Bishop of Connecticut in 1931. He was consecrated on December 16, 1931, by Presiding Bishop James De Wolf Perry. He succeeded as diocesan bishop on January 28, 1934. He retired in 1951 and died suddenly of a stroke on September 25, 1953.

== Family ==
Budlong married Mary Elizabeth Corbett on April 30, 1910. After her death on June 12, 1946, he married Kathleen Faulconer Kelly (1880-1973) on November 18, 1947.

== See also ==
- List of bishops of the Episcopal Church in the United States of America

Episcopal Church (USA) titles
| Preceded by Edward Campion Acheson | 7th Bishop of Connecticut; 1934–1950 | Succeeded by Walter H. Gray |
