= Clarence Coleridge =

Guyanese-born American Episcopalian clergyman

The Right Reverend Clarence Nicholas Coleridge
- 13th Bishop of Connecticut
- Church: Episcopal Church
- Diocese: Connecticut
- In office: 1993–1999
- Predecessor: Arthur E. Walmsley
- Successor: Andrew Smith
- Other post: Assisting Bishop of Pennsylvania
- Previous post: Suffragan Bishop of Connecticut (1981-1993)

Orders
- Ordination: January 1, 1962
- Consecration: October 23, 1981 by John Allin

Personal details
- Born: November 27, 1930 Georgetown, Guyana
- Died: August 10, 2023 (aged 92)
- Denomination: Anglican
- Parents: Charles Coleridge & Ina DeWeever
- Spouse: Euna Jervis Coleridge
- Children: 2

Clarence Nicholas Coleridge (November 27, 1930 – August 10, 2023) was a Guyanese-born American Episcopalian clergyman who was the first black bishop of the Diocese of Connecticut, from 1993 to 1999. Prior to that he was the Suffragan Bishop of Connecticut from 1981 to 1993.

== Biography ==
Originally from Guyana, Coleridge obtained a Master of Social Work degree from the University of Connecticut and a Doctor of Ministry from the Andover Newton Theological School. He was ordained to the diaconate on January 27, 1961, and to the priesthood on January 1, 1962. He was ordained and consecrated to the episcopate on October 23, 1981. He received three honorary degrees, including one from Yale Divinity School. Habitat for Humanity built five houses in his name as the Coleridge Commons in Bridgeport, Connecticut.

In 1994, Coleridge started the Bishops' Fund for Children, which enhances awareness of the plight of children at risk throughout Connecticut. The fund supported social service programs that aid these children in urban, suburban, and rural neighborhoods. In its first two decades, the fund provided more than $1 million to more than 150 non-profits in the state. As of 2016, the Bishops' Fund for Children now supports at-risk children to attend Camp Washington, the diocesan camp and retreat center.

Bishop Coleridge was married for over 50 years to Euna Idris (Jervis) Coleridge (1934-2017), a high school science teacher who was awarded the Olmstead Award for Teacher of the Year from Williams College. They had two children, Cheryl and Carolyn. Clarence Coleridge died on August 10, 2023, at the age of 92.

== See also ==
- List of bishops of the Episcopal Church in the United States of America

Episcopal Church (USA) titles
Preceded by Arthur E. Walmsley	13th Bishop of Connecticut; 1993–1999	Succeeded by Andrew Smith
