= John H. Esquirol =

American religious leader (1900–1970)

The Right Reverend John Henry Esquirol
- Bishop of Connecticut
- Church: Episcopal Church
- Diocese: Connecticut
- In office: 1969–1970
- Predecessor: Walter H. Gray
- Successor: J. Warren Hutchens
- Previous posts: Suffragan Bishop of Connecticut (1958-1968); Coadjutor Bishop of Connecticut (1968-1969)

Orders
- Ordination: 1937 by Ernest M. Stires
- Consecration: April 9, 1958 by Henry Knox Sherrill

Personal details
- Born: May 18, 1900 Brooklyn, New York, U.S.
- Died: December 31, 1970 (aged 70) Hartford, Connecticut, U.S.
- Buried: Oak Lawn Cemetery; Fairfield, Connecticut, U.S.
- Denomination: Anglican
- Parents: Joseph Henry Esquirol & Grace Ella Alfred
- Spouse: Margaret Louise Joost
- Children: 2

John Henry Esquirol (May 18, 1900 – December 31, 1970) was the ninth bishop of the Episcopal Diocese of Connecticut.

== Early life and education ==
Esquirol was born in Brooklyn, New York on May 18, 1900, the son of Joseph Henry Esquirol and Grace Ella Alfred. He studied at New York University where he graduated with a Bachelor of Science in 1920. He furthered his studies in the Law School of the same university and earned the Doctor of Jurisprudence in 1923, after which he practiced law in Brooklyn for thirteen years. He then studied theology at the General Theological Seminary from where he graduated in 1936. He was awarded the degree of Doctor of Sacred Theology from Berkeley Divinity School.

== Priest ==
Esquirol was ordained deacon in 1936 and priest a year later, both times by the Bishop of Long Island, Ernest M. Stires. He served as curate at St Gabriel's Church in Hollis, Queens, New York from 1936 to 1937. He also was the assistant to the Dean of the Cathedral of the Incarnation in Garden City, New York from 1937 to 1939. In 1939 he became the rector of Trinity Church in Southport, Connecticut where he remained until 1956 when he was appointed Dean of Christ Church Cathedral in Hartford, Connecticut.

== Bishop ==
Esquirol was elected as Suffragan Bishop of Connecticut on January 10, 1958. He was consecrated on April 9, 1958 with Presiding Bishop Henry Knox Sherrill as chief consecrator in Christ Church Cathedral in Hartford, Connecticut. He was elected Coadjutor Bishop in May 1968. He succeeded as diocesan bishop in May 1969 upon the retirement of Bishop Walter H. Gray. During his episcopacy he was vocal in combating racism and advocating the need to listen to young people. Bishop Esquirol died shortly after his accession on December 31, 1970, after a long illness. He was buried at Oak Lawn Cemetery in Fairfield.

== Personal life ==
On April 28, 1927, he married Margaret Louise Joost and together they had two sons.

Episcopal Church (USA) titles
Preceded by Walter H. Gray	9th Bishop of Connecticut; 1970	Succeeded by J. Warren Hutchens
Preceded by Robert McConnell Hatch	Suffragan Bishop of Connecticut; 1958–1970	Vacant Title next held by J. Warren Hutchens
