= St. John's Episcopal Church (West Hartford, Connecticut) =

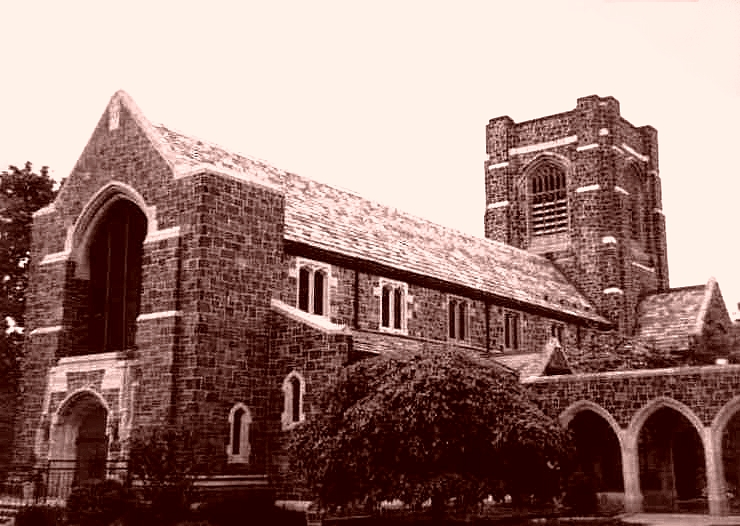
- The church building in 2011.

- Location within the United States Location within Connecticut
- 41.766502°N 72.717326°W
- Location: West Hartford, Connecticut
- Country: United States
- Denomination: Episcopal
- Website: www.sjparish.net

History
- Former name: St. John's Episcopal Church (Hartford, Connecticut)
- Status: Church
- Founded: 1841
- Dedication: John the Apostle
- Consecrated: June 9, 1909; April 28, 1996
- Events: Accidental fire on October 10, 1992

Architecture
- Functional status: Active
- Architect(s): Bertram Grosvenor Goodhue, A.I.A; Richard Scoville Krissinger, A.I.A
- Completed: June 9, 1909; April 16, 1995

Administration
- Diocese: Episcopal Diocese of Connecticut

Clergy
- Priest(s): The Reverend Todd FitzGerald, Priest-In-Charge; The Reverend Margie Baker, Assistant Rector

St. John's is an Episcopal Church located at 679 Farmington Avenue in West Hartford, Connecticut near the Hartford, Connecticut, city line. The parish was founded in 1841 as St. John's Episcopal Church in Hartford. The church's present building, designed by famed architect Bertram Grosvenor Goodhue, opened in 1909. It is noted for its reredos designed by Mr. Goodhue and executed by prominent sculptor Lee Lawrie; its organ, Opus 2761 by Austin Organs, Inc., with 64 ranks and 3721 pipes; and its thirty-six stained glass windows by designers/manufacturers such as the Harry Eldredge Goodhue Company of Cambridge, Massachusetts, Wilbur H. Burnham Studios of Boston, Massachusetts, and London, England's James Powell and Sons.

The church reported 862 members in 2017 and 921 members in 2023; no membership statistics were reported nationally in 2024 parochial reports. Plate and pledge income reported for the congregation in 2024 was $617,195. Average Sunday attendance (ASA) in 2024 was 139 persons, down from a reported 181 in 2020.

== Congregation history ==
St. John's Episcopal Church was founded in 1841, in downtown Hartford, Connecticut. Its first building was designed by Henry Austin (architect). An activist organization, St. John's was instrumental in the development of other prominent Hartford area churches including the Church of the Good Shepherd and Parish House, St. John's Episcopal Church in East Hartford, and St. Monica's, the second Episcopal congregation in the state for African Americans. As the nineteenth century progressed, the western suburbs became increasingly popular as a place for city dwellers to live with the result that the number of St. John's worshipers was in decline. In 1907, financier J. P. Morgan purchased the church building and its property for the construction of a memorial gallery to be added to Hartford's Wadsworth Atheneum. The congregation then moved to suburban West Hartford, Connecticut, which was undergoing steady growth.

== Present church building ==
The land for the current site, located adjacent to the main trolley line westbound from Hartford, was donated by longtime parishioners Dr. Thomas B. and John O. Enders. The firm of Cram, Goodhue and Ferguson was hired to design the new building with the assignment going to their New York Office headed by Mr. Goodhue. St. John's was the middle of three Episcopal churches designed by the New York Office in a relatively short period of time. The first was Christ Church in West Haven, Connecticut, and the last St. Mark's Episcopal Church (Mt. Kisco, New York) with each having a measure of similarity in the look of their exteriors and interiors. St. John's West Hartford held its first service in the new building on Easter Sunday, 1909.

As initially built, St. John's consisted of the church and a small office wing. Mr. Goodhue's plan for the site included a number of additional features which evolved during subsequent upgrades. In 1914-5 a small parish house with an auditorium was added to the structure and in 1922-3 a reredos and high altar designed by Mr. Goodhue and executed by sculptor Lee Lawrie were made part of a significant improvement to St. John's interior. A major facilities upgrade occurred in 1927 with the addition of two bays to the church to alleviate overcrowding, the construction of a large parish house with an adjacent cloister garden, and the installation of an outdoor pulpit built into a Peace Cross. 1955 brought the addition of a chapel, with its own pipe organ, to hold the burgeoning church school.

=== Fire ===
On the night of October 10, 1992, a fire caused by spontaneous combustion of oil-soaked rags left in a maintenance room caused about $7 million of damage to the church's interior and exterior including the complete destruction of the stained glass window over the reredos (which itself was lightly affected), the auditorium, the 1950 Austin Organ, and its antiphonal of 1978. Other smoke and fire damage occurred throughout the structure, including the roof over the chancel and parts of the parish house. Church leaders moved forward to restore Mr. Goodhue's original designs as much as possible and to rejuvenate the infrastructure of the 83-year-old building. It reopened with a new altar window and auditorium, along with a large number of replaced or refurbished windows and furnishings, for services on April 16, 1995. The new organ was dedicated in 1996.

== Notable people ==
Dr. John Franklin Enders (1897–1985), a member of an important St. John's family, won the Nobel Prize in Physiology or Medicine in 1954. He was Baptized at St. John's Episcopal in Hartford, and later became a confirmed member of the Episcopal Church at the parish's then new location in West Hartford. Following his death in 1985, St. John's arranged a graveside service at Fairview Cemetery in West Hartford, his birthplace.

Among St. John's many notable clergy have been two assistants who later became Bishops: Walter Henry Gray of the Episcopal Diocese of Connecticut and Kirk Stevan Smith of the Episcopal Diocese of Arizona.

Prominent musicians affiliated with St. John's include organist and choirmaster Clarence Watters, who was at St. John's from 1929 to 1932 and again from 1952 to 1976. One of Marcel Dupré's "first and most enduring disciples-exponents-friends", who had studied with Dupré in Paris, he was also head of the music department at Trinity College, Hartford. "One of [the 20th] century’s greatest organ virtuosos", Watters counted Charles-Marie Widor and other prominent organist/composers in his circle of friends and close associates.
