= Christ Church (New Haven) =

Historic church in Connecticut, United States

- Christ Church New Haven
- U.S. National Register of Historic Places
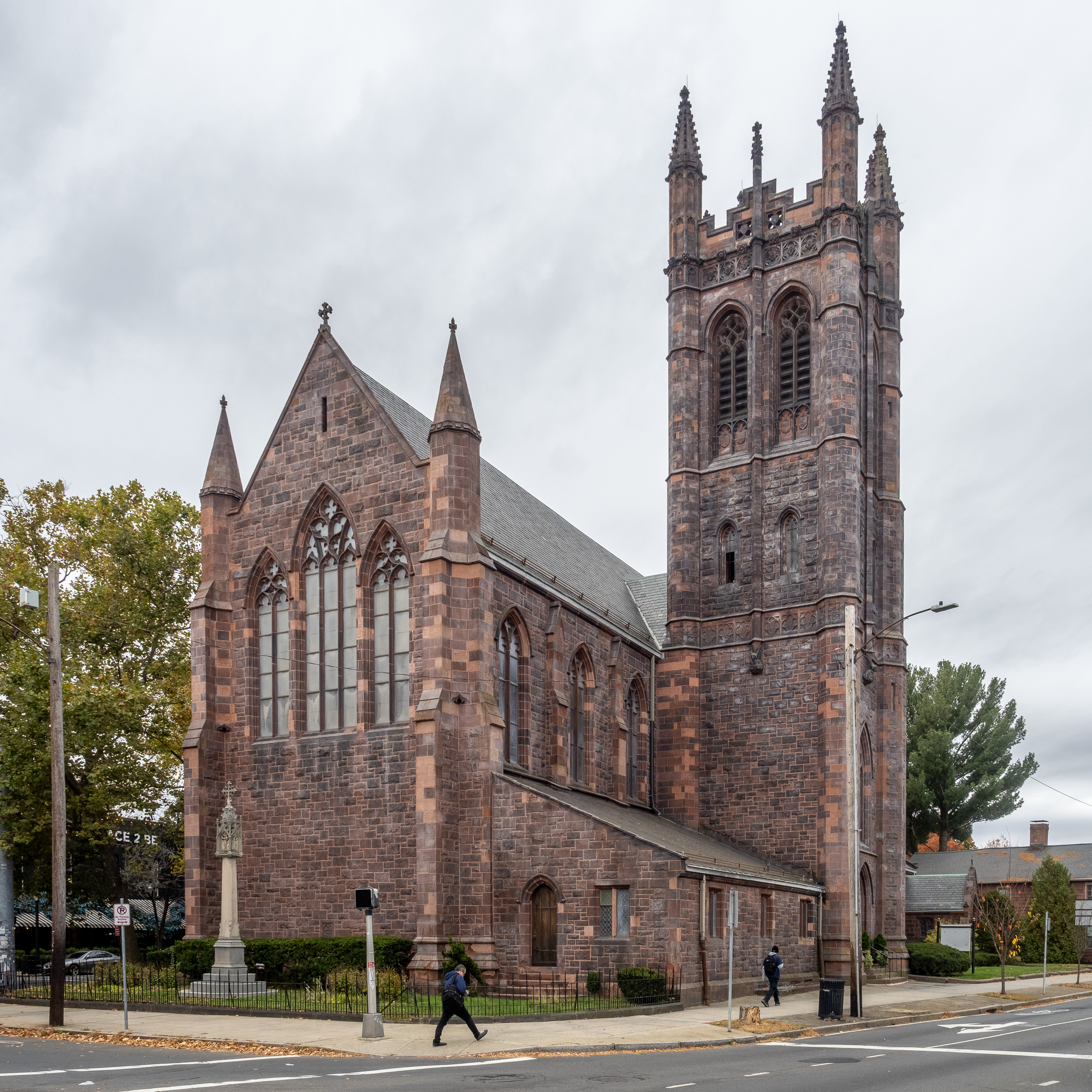
- (2024)

- Location within Connecticut Location within the United States
- Location: 70 Broadway, New Haven, Connecticut
- Coordinates: 41°18′42″N 72°55′55″W
- NRHP reference No.: 09000420
- Added to NRHP: June 19, 2009

Christ Church, also known as Christ Church New Haven, is an Episcopal parish church at 70 Broadway in New Haven, Connecticut. Christ Church follows an Anglo-Catholic style of worship and has a strong focus on urban ministry. The parish began as an offshoot from New Haven's Trinity Church, the central Episcopal church on New Haven's town green.

The church reported 207 members in 2015 and 240 members in 2025. Plate and pledge income reported for the congregation in 2024 was $284,835 with average Sunday attendance (ASA) of 106 persons; this is a decrease from 188 ASA in 2018.

The church building was listed on the National Register of Historic Places in 2009.

== History ==
The church building, completed in 1898, was designed by architect Henry Vaughan.

It is notable for its Gothic Revival architecture, and its central location near downtown New Haven makes it something of a landmark. Its stone tower is modeled on the tower of Magdalen College, Oxford. Vaughn personally chose the artists who created the beautiful interior. Bavarian-born Johannes Kirchmayer executed the intricate wood carving, notable in particular on the rood screen. The stained glass windows (including a large window at the back of the sanctuary above the baptismal font) were created by the noted firm of C.E. Kempe in London. The high altar also features monmunental stone figures and a carved Caen stone reredos inspired by examples in Winchester Cathedral and St. Alban's in England.

The church's Solemn High Mass (11:00am Sundays) is locally notable for its fine choral music and beautiful liturgy. Compline, sung at 9:00pm September–May, draws a large crowd of both young and old from the city of New Haven and surrounding communities as well as from nearby Yale University. Christ Church also houses the headquarters of the North American branch of the Society of Catholic Priests, a society of clergy in the mainstream of the Episcopal Church who practice the Anglo-Catholic tradition.

== Notable burials ==
- Bentley Layton (1941–2025) – Yale professor

== See also ==
- National Register of Historic Places listings in New Haven, Connecticut
