= St. John's Episcopal Church (Bridgeport, Connecticut) =

Historic church in Connecticut, United States

- U.S. National Register of Historic Places
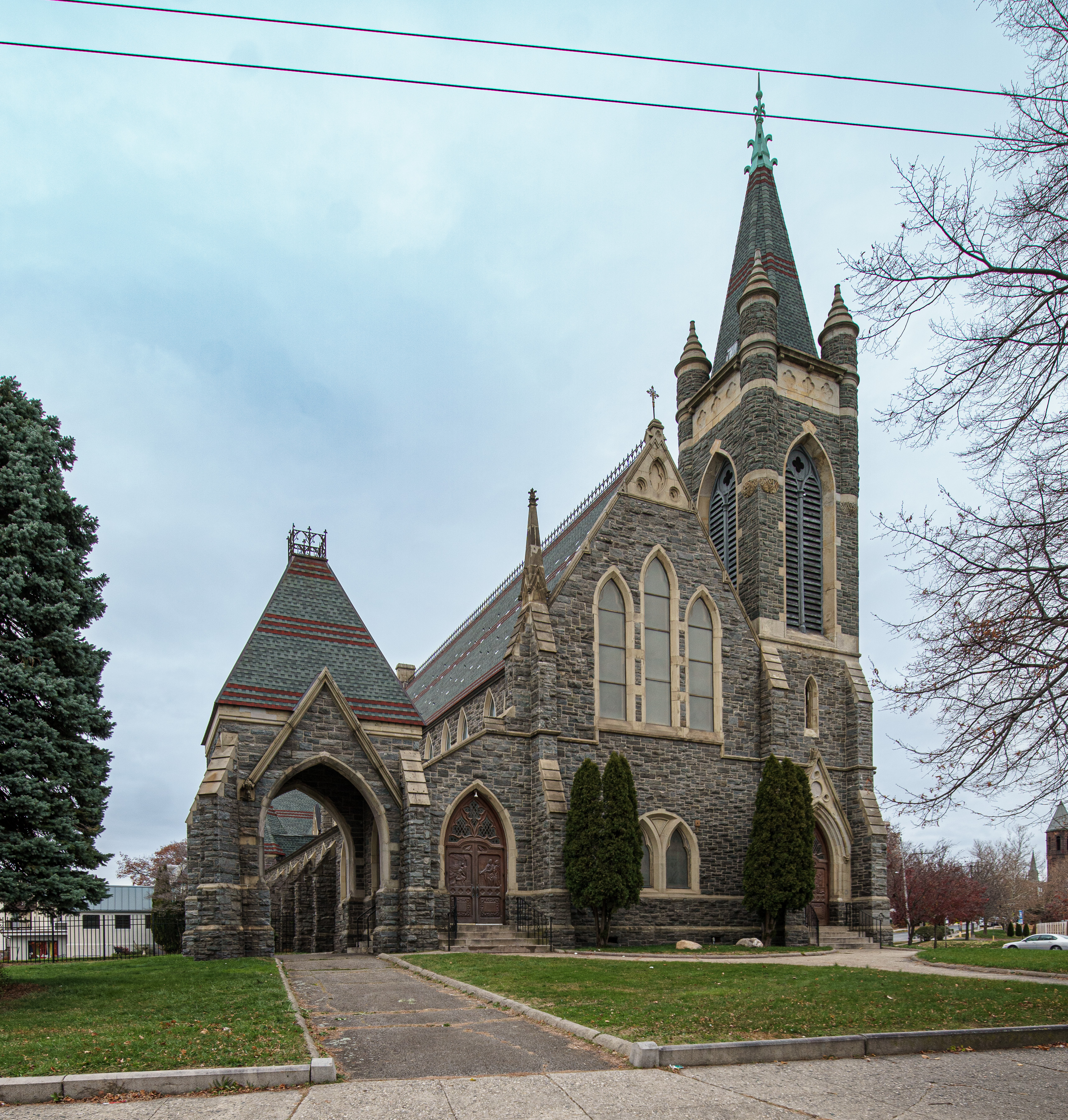

- Location within Connecticut Location within the United States
- Location: 768 Fairfield Avenue, Bridgeport, Connecticut
- Coordinates: 41°10′31″N 73°11′59″W
- Area: 1 acre (0.40 ha)
- Built: 1873
- Architect: James Renwick Jr. et al
- Architectural style: Gothic Revival
- NRHP reference No.: 84000820
- Added to NRHP: August 2, 1984

St. John's Episcopal Church is a historic church at 768 Fairfield Avenue in Bridgeport, Connecticut. Built in 1873 for a congregation founded in the mid-18th century, it is a well-preserved design of James Renwick Jr. and a good example of late 19th-century Gothic Revival architecture. It was listed on the National Register in 1984.

The church reported 356 members in 2015 and 396 members in 2023; no membership statistics were reported in 2024 parochial reports. Plate and pledge income for the congregation in 2024 was $31,100 with average Sunday attendance (ASA) of 58.

== Description and history ==
St. John's Episcopal Church is located west of downtown Bridgeport, its complex occupying part of a block bounded on the north by Laurel Avenue, the south by Fairfield Avenue, and the east by Park Avenue. The church building is arrayed with its long axis along Park Avenue, with its main facade facing south toward Fairfield Avenue. The church is a Gothic Revival structure, built out of granite quarried at Greenwich, Connecticut with lighter-colored trim from Ohio. It is roofed with dark slate tiles with bands of red slate. At the southeast corner stands a square tower, with stone buttresses at its lower level, a belfry at the second stage, and a pyramidal cap that has rounded turrets at the corners. Main entrances to the building are located in the base of the tower, with a matching entrance in a lower projection on the left side of the main block.

The congregation of St. John's was organized as an Anglican mission in 1738, and is one of the oldest Episcopal congregations in the state. It was formally recognized as a parish in 1784. The present building is its fourth sanctuary, the congregation having outgrown each of the first three to be built. The church was designed by James Renwick Jr., a leading practitioner of church design in the late 19th century best known for St. Patrick's Cathedral in Manhattan. The church was built in 1873-75, its chapel wing on the north side was added 1886-1888, and the rectory was built in 1903. The parish hall/guild hall complex was built in 1930. The church altar is adorned by a reredos created by sculptor Gutzon Borglum and installed in 1913.

== See also ==
- National Register of Historic Places listings in Bridgeport, Connecticut
