= Andrew Smith (bishop) =

Bishop in Connecticut

The Right Reverend Andrew Donnan Smith
- Bishop of Connecticut
- Church: Episcopal Church
- Diocese: Connecticut
- Elected: June 19, 1999
- In office: 1999–2010
- Predecessor: Clarence Coleridge
- Successor: Ian Douglas
- Previous post: Suffragan Bishop of Connecticut (1996-1999)

Orders
- Ordination: March 22, 1969
- Consecration: May 4, 1996 by Edmond L. Browning

Personal details
- Born: 1944 (age 81–82) Albany, New York, United States
- Denomination: Anglican
- Spouse: Kate Carroll Trafford
- Children: 2

Andrew Donnan Smith (born 1944) was a suffragan bishop of the Episcopal Diocese of Connecticut from 1996 to 1999, and diocesan bishop from 1999 to 2010.

== Biography ==
Smith was born in Albany, New York in 1944, and was educated at the public schools in North Plainfield, New Jersey. In 1965 he graduated with a Bachelor of Arts degree from Trinity College, Connecticut; he then earned his Master of Divinity (M.Div.) degree from Episcopal Theological School in 1968.

He was ordained to the diaconate on June 11, 1968, and to the priesthood on March 22, 1969. He served as curate of Trinity Church in Hartford from 1968 till 1971. Later he became the assistant priest of St John's Church in Waterbury, Connecticut where he remained until 1976 after which he became rector at St Michael's Church in Naugatuck, Connecticut. He also served as rector at St Mary's Church in Manchester, Connecticut from 1985 till 1996.

Smith was elected Suffragan Bishop of Connecticut on October 28, 1995. He was consecrated on May 4, 1996, with Presiding Bishop Edmond L. Browning as chief consecrator. He was elected Bishop of Connecticut in June 1999 and was installed on October 16 of the same year. He remained diocesan bishop until 2010, after which he served as assistant bishop in the Episcopal Diocese of New York for three years.

== See also ==
- Historical list of bishops of the Episcopal Church in the United States of America

== Footnotes ==
Episcopal Church (USA) titles
| Preceded by Clarence Coleridge | 14th Bishop of Connecticut; 1999–2010 | Succeeded by Ian Douglas |
