= Christ Church Cathedral (Hartford, Connecticut) =

Historic church in Connecticut, United States

Christ Church
- Christ Church Cathedral
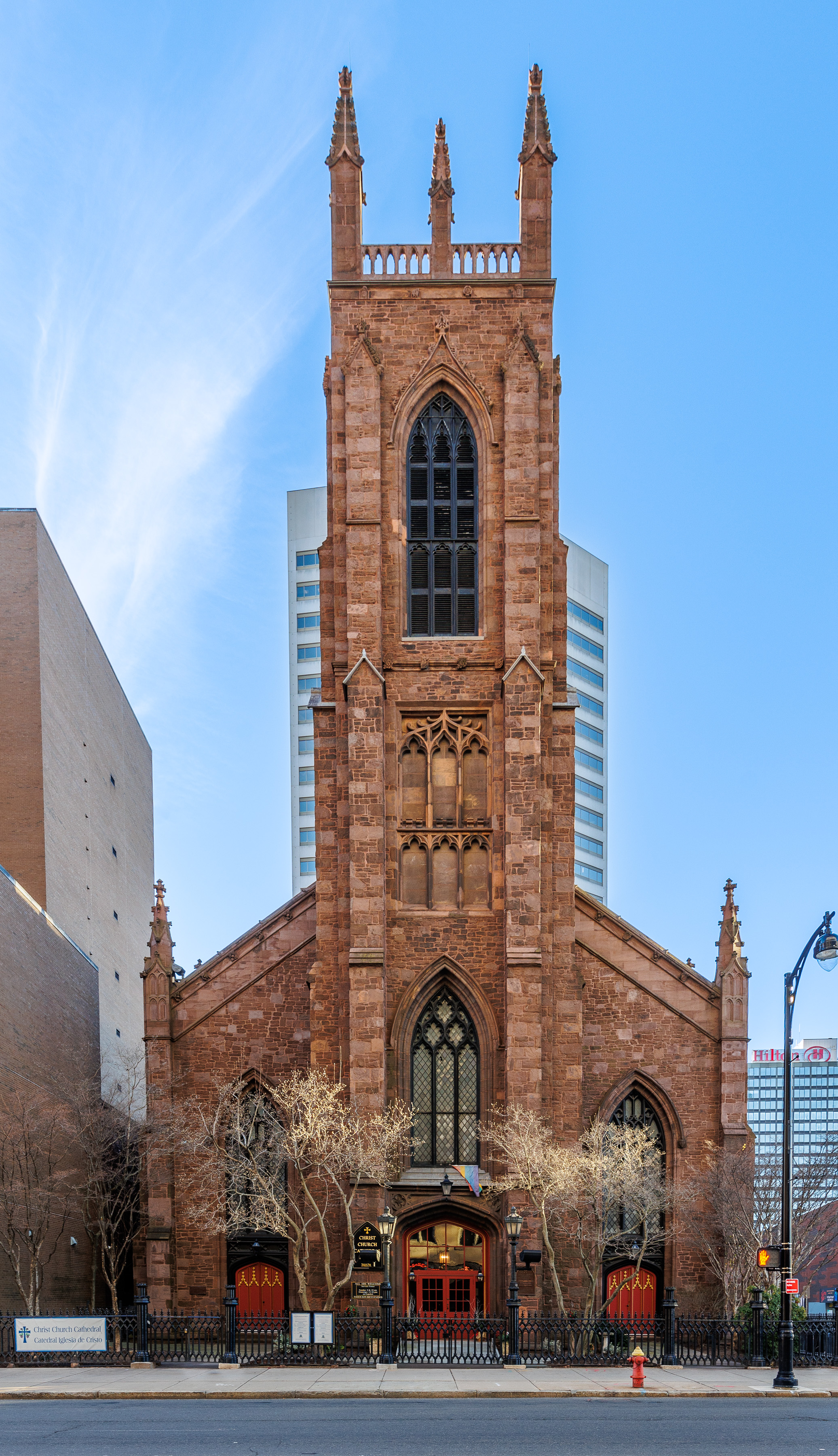
- Christ Church
- 41°46′6″N 72°40′27″W
- Location: 955 Main Street, Hartford, Connecticut
- Country: United States
- Denomination: Episcopal Church

History
- Founded: 1795
- Consecrated: December 23, 1829

Architecture
- Architect(s): Ithiel Town; Nathaniel Sheldon Wheaton (tower)
- Style: Gothic Revival
- Years built: 1827-1829
- Completed: 1939 (tower)

Administration
- District: North Central
- Province: New England
- Diocese: Connecticut

Clergy
- Bishop: Jeffrey W. Mello
- Priest: Jay Cooke
- Christ Church Cathedral
- U.S. National Register of Historic Places
- NRHP reference No.: 83003558
- Added to NRHP: December 29, 1983

Christ Church Cathedral is a historic church at 955 Main Street in Downtown Hartford, Connecticut. Built in the 1820s to a design by Ithiel Town, it is one of the earliest known examples of Gothic Revival architecture in the United States. It was listed on the National Register of Historic Places in 1983. It is the cathedral church of the Episcopal Diocese of Connecticut, whose offices are next door at 45 Church Street. The cathedral reported 469 members in 2015 and 143 members in 2025. Plate and pledge income for the congregation in 2025 was $135,671 with average Sunday attendance (ASA) of 93. This was a relative decrease from ASA of 154 in 2015.

== Architecture and history ==
Christ Church Cathedral stands in downtown Hartford at the southwest corner of Church and Main Streets, surrounded by large-scale commercial buildings. It is a basically rectangular brownstone structure, with a square tower centered at its eastern end. The main facade is divided into three sections by the tower, each of which has a doorway set in a two-story Gothic-arched recess, with a window above. The sides are five bays deep, with buttresses separating Gothic-arched windows, and brownstone finials at intervals along the roof line. The finial details are repeated at the top of the tower, which is surrounded by a low balustrade.

Anglican services have been held in Connecticut since 1702. The Episcopal Diocese of Connecticut was organized in 1785 by Samuel Seabury. This church was designed by New Haven architect Ithiel Town, who designed that city's Trinity Church. Primary construction of the edifice lasted from 1827 to 1829, with the tower (designed by Nathaniel Sheldon Wheaton, after traveling to see country churches in England) not completed until 1939. These two Town designs are the oldest known examples of Gothic Revival architecture in the United States. Later additions to the building include alterations designed by Henry Austin, George Keller, Frederick Withers, and Ralph Adams Cram. These were typically done with great care to enhance or complement Town's original design.

== See also ==
- List of the Episcopal cathedrals of the United States
- List of cathedrals in the United States
- Richard Thomas Nolan
- National Register of Historic Places listings in Hartford, Connecticut
