= Frederic C. Lawrence =

American suffragan bishop

The Right Reverend Frederic C. Lawrence
- Suffragan Bishop of Massachusetts
- Church: Episcopal Church
- Diocese: Massachusetts
- Elected: May 3, 1956
- In office: 1956–1968
- Predecessor: Raymond A. Heron
- Successor: Morris F. Arnold

Orders
- Ordination: May 1925 by William Lawrence
- Consecration: November 3, 1956 by Henry Knox Sherrill

Personal details
- Born: May 22, 1899 Cambridge, Massachusetts, United States
- Died: April 16, 1989 (aged 89) Brookline, Massachusetts, United States
- Buried: Mount Auburn Cemetery
- Denomination: Anglican
- Parents: William Lawrence, Julia Cunningham
- Spouse: Katharine Virginia Wylie (m. 1928)
- Children: 6

Frederic Cunningham Lawrence (May 22, 1899 – April 16, 1989) was a suffragan bishop of the Diocese of Massachusetts (1956–1968).

== Early life and education ==
Lawrence was born on May 22, 1899, in Cambridge, Massachusetts, the son of Bishop William Lawrence and Julia Cunningham. He was educated at the Milton Academy and then at Harvard College from where he graduated Bachelor of Arts in 1920. After that, he spent a year, between 1920 and 1921, studying at Corpus Christi College in Cambridge, England. He then studied at the Union Theological Seminary between 1921 and 1922, and then at the Episcopal Theological School in Cambridge, Massachusetts, from where he earned a Bachelor of Divinity in 1924. Lawrence earned his Doctor of Divinity degree from Harvard Divinity School in 1937.

== Ordained ministry ==
Lawrence was ordained deacon in May 1924 and priest in May 1925, on both occasions by his own father, Bishop William Lawrence. He served as curate at All Saints' Church in Worcester between 1924 and 1925 and then as chaplain at Harvard University and associate priest at St Paul's Cathedral in Boston between 1925 and 1927. In 1927, he became rector of St Peter's Church in Cambridge, Massachusetts, while in 1941, he was appointed rector of St Paul's Church in nearby Brookline, Massachusetts, where he remained till 1956.

=== Bishop ===
Lawrence was elected Suffragan Bishop of Massachusetts on May 3, 1956, in St Paul's Cathedral, Boston. He was consecrated on November 3, 1956, in Trinity Church, Boston, by Presiding Bishop Henry Knox Sherrill. He retained that position in the Episcopal Diocese of Massachusetts until his retirement in 1968. He was active with the Episcopal chaplaincy at Harvard and was a trustee of Milton Academy and the American University of Beirut. He died on April 16, 1989, at his home in Brookline, Massachusetts, after a lengthily illness.

== Family ==
His father, William Lawrence, was the seventh Bishop of Massachusetts (1893–1927). Lawrence was the grandson of the notable abolitionist Amos Adams Lawrence and a member of the influential Boston family, founded by his great-great-grandfather and American revolutionary Samuel Lawrence; his great-grandfather was the noted philanthropist Amos Lawrence.

Lawrence's brother, William Appleton Lawrence, was the third Bishop of Western Massachusetts (1925–1941).

William Lawrence married Katharine Virginia Wylie on April 10, 1928, and together had six children.
