= Norman Nash =

American bishop

The Right Reverend Norman Nash D.D.
- Bishop of Massachusetts
- Church: Episcopal Church
- Diocese: Massachusetts
- Elected: December 1946
- In office: 1947–1956
- Predecessor: Henry Knox Sherrill
- Successor: Anson Phelps Stokes
- Previous post: Coadjutor Bishop of Massachusetts (1947)

Orders
- Ordination: October 4, 1916 by William Lawrence
- Consecration: February 14, 1947 by Henry Knox Sherrill

Personal details
- Born: June 5, 1888 Bangor, Maine, United States
- Died: January 3, 1963 (aged 74) Cambridge, Massachusetts, United States
- Buried: Mount Auburn Cemetery, Cambridge, Massachusetts
- Denomination: Anglican
- Parents: Henry Sylvester Nash & Bessie Keefler Curtis
- Spouse: Mariane Noble
- Children: 3
- Education: Harvard University; Williams College

Norman Burdett Nash (June 5, 1888 – January 3, 1963) was the tenth bishop of Massachusetts in The Episcopal Church.

== Early life and education ==
Nash was born in Bangor, Maine, on June 5, 1888, the son of the Reverend Henry Sylvester Nash and Bessie Keefler Curtis. He was educated at the Cambridge Latin School of Harvard College and at Williams College. He graduated with a Bachelor of Divinity from Episcopal Theological Seminary in 1915. He was awarded a Doctor of Sacred Theology from Western Theological Seminary, Williams College and Trinity College, respectively.

== Ordination ==
Nash was ordained deacon on May 27, 1915 and priest on October 4, 1916 by the bishop of Massachusetts William Lawrence. After ordination he became professor of Christian social ethics at the Episcopal Theological Seminary and in 1939 became rector of St Paul's school in Concord, New Hampshire.

== Bishop ==
Nash was elected Coadjutor Bishop of Massachusetts on the first ballot during a special convention that took place in St Paul's Cathedral in Boston in December 1946. He was consecrated on February 14, 1947, by Presiding Bishop Henry Knox Sherrill in Trinity Church, Boston. He became diocesan that same year and remained in the post till 1956.
