= Anson Phelps Stokes (bishop) =

American bishop

The Right Reverend Anson Phelps Stokes III D.D.
- Bishop of Massachusetts
- Church: Episcopal Church
- See: Massachusetts
- In office: 1956–1970
- Predecessor: Norman Burdett Nash
- Successor: John Melville Burgess
- Previous post: Coadjutor Bishop of Massachusetts (1954-1956)

Orders
- Ordination: March 19, 1933 by James Craik Morris
- Consecration: December 4, 1954 by Henry Knox Sherrill

Personal details
- Born: January 11, 1905 New Haven, Connecticut, United States
- Died: November 7, 1986 (aged 81) Brookline, Massachusetts
- Denomination: Anglican
- Parents: Anson Phelps Stokes and Caroline Green Mitchell
- Spouse: Hope Procter
- Children: 2
- Education: Yale University; Episcopal Divinity School; Kenyon College

Anson Phelps Stokes III (January 11, 1905 - November 7, 1986) was the eleventh bishop of the Episcopal Diocese of Massachusetts in Boston, Massachusetts from 1956 to 1970.

== Biography ==
He was the son of Anson Phelps Stokes Jr. and grandson of Anson Phelps Stokes of Phelps Dodge. An alumnus of St. Paul's School (Concord, New Hampshire), he received a BA from Yale in 1927, a BD from the Episcopal Theological School (now the Episcopal Divinity School), a DD from Kenyon College and later degrees from Columbia, Berkeley Divinity School, and Suffolk University. He was ordained deacon in 1932 and priest on March 19, 1933, in St Mark's Church, Shreveport, Louisiana.

He was married to Hope Procter of the family which founded Procter & Gamble.

Episcopal Church (USA) titles
Preceded by Norman Burdett Nash	Bishop of Massachusetts; 1956–1970	Succeeded by John Melville Burgess
