= Samuel G. Babcock =

American bishop

The Right Reverend Samuel Gavitt Babcock D.D.
- Suffragan Bishop of Massachusetts
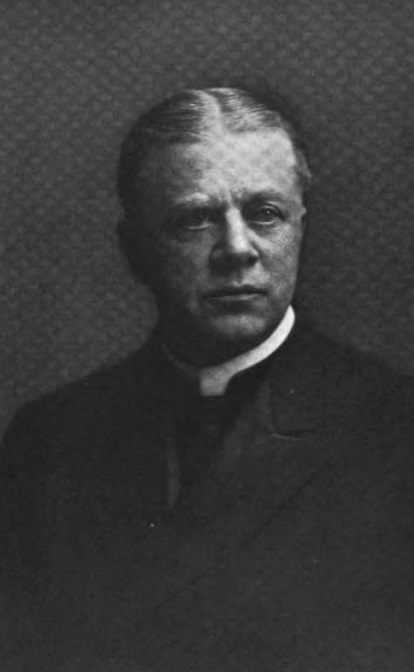
- Church: Episcopal Church
- Diocese: Massachusetts
- Elected: 1913
- In office: 1913–1938
- Successor: Raymond A. Heron

Orders
- Ordination: September 28, 1891 by Thomas M. Clark
- Consecration: June 17, 1913 by William Lawrence

Personal details
- Born: October 8, 1851 Newport, Rhode Island, United States
- Died: June 20, 1942 (aged 90)
- Buried: Mount Auburn Cemetery
- Denomination: Anglican
- Parents: Stanton Babcock & Sarah J. White
- Spouse: Abbie Green Miller (m. 1875; died 1922) Mary Kent Davey (m. 1923)

Samuel Gavitt Babcock (October 8, 1851 – June 20, 1942) was an American bishop in the Episcopal Church, serving as Suffragan Bishop of Massachusetts between 1913 and 1938.

== Early life and education ==
Babcock was born on October 8, 1851, in Newport, Rhode Island, the son of Stanton Babcock and Sarah J. White. He was educated at the public schools of Newport, Rhode Island and Salem, Massachusetts, before attending Harvard University to study at the Episcopal Theological School, from where he graduated in 1891 with a Bachelor of Divinity. He was awarded a Doctor of Divinity by Brown University in 1915.

== Ordained ministry ==
Babcock was ordained deacon on January 13, 1877, and priest on September 28, 1891, by Bishop Thomas M. Clark of Rhode Island. During his diaconate he was active in local missionary work and served as assistant at Christ Church in Westerly, Rhode Island. After ordination to the priesthood, he served as curate of Grace Church in Providence, Rhode Island between 1891 and 1892, rector of Christ Church in Hyde Park, Massachusetts between 1892 and 1903, Archdeacon of New Bedford between 1899 and 1903, and then Archdeacon of Massachusetts from 1903 to 1913.

== Bishop ==
Bobcock was elected suffragan bishop of Massachusetts in 1913, and was consecrated on June 17, 1913, by the Bishop of Massachusetts William Lawrence. He retained the post till his retirement in 1938. He was the first Suffragan Bishop of Massachusetts and one of the first in the Episcopal Church. He died on June 20, 1942. His funeral was held in St Paul's Cathedra, Boston, where Bishop Henry Knox Sherrill was celebrant.
