= Episcopal Diocese of Massachusetts =

Episcopal Church diocese in the US

Coordinates: 42°21′20.90″N 71°03′44.64″W

Diocese of Massachusetts Diœcesis Massachusettensis

Location
- Country: United States
- Ecclesiastical province: Province I
- Deaneries: 12

Statistics
- Congregations: 162 (2024)
- Members: 38,328 (2025)

Information
- Denomination: Episcopal Church
- Established: September 8, 1784
- Cathedral: St Paul's Cathedral
- Language: English, American Sign Language, Dinka, Spanish

Current leadership
- Bishop: The Right Rev. Julia Whitworth
- Assistant bishops: Ian T. Douglas, Mary D. Glasspool

Map
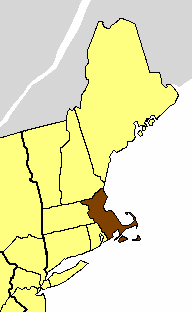
- Location of the Diocese of Massachusetts

Website
- diomass.org

The Episcopal Diocese of Massachusetts is one of the nine original dioceses of the Episcopal Church in the United States of America. The diocese reported 58,475 members in 2015 and 38,328 members in 2025. Plate and pledge income for the 162 filing congregations of the diocese in 2025 was $37,433,385. Average Sunday attendance (ASA) reported in 2025 was 9,709 persons, a relative decline from 15,185 in 2016.

== History ==
Massachusetts was founded by Puritans who did not accept such aspects of the Church of England as bishops and the Book of Common Prayer. The first Anglican parish in the Massachusetts Bay Colony was King's Chapel in Boston, founded in 1688, 58 years after the city. After the American Revolution, King's Chapel became the first Unitarian congregation in North America. The oldest remaining parishes in the diocese are Christ Church in Quincy, founded in 1704, St. Paul's in Newburyport, founded as Queen Anne's Chapel in 1711, St. Michael's Church in Marblehead, founded in 1714, Christ Church in Boston (Old North Church), founded in 1723, and St. Andrew's Church in South Scituate (now Hanover), founded in 1727.

The diocese was organized in 1784, five years before the Episcopal Church itself. The first bishop (for New England) was Samuel Seabury who was consecrated by the bishops of the Scottish Episcopal Church in 1784.

Today, it is one of the largest dioceses in the ECUSA in terms of membership. It encompasses the eastern part of Massachusetts, specifically, the nine counties east and southeast of Worcester County.

The diocese was the first in the Anglican Communion to consecrate a woman as a bishop. Barbara Harris became bishop suffragan of the diocese in 1989. It became the first diocese in the Episcopal Church to install an African American as diocesan bishop when John Melville Burgess was consecrated as the 12th bishop in 1970.

The current diocesan bishop is Julia Whitworth. She was consecrated bishop in October 2024 and succeeded Alan M. Gates. The current assistant bishop is Carol Gallagher, consecrated in January 2003.

Historically, the diocese has been considered Low Church; however, there are a number of Anglo-Catholic parishes, the most notable of which is the Church of the Advent in Boston. Its best-known Low Church parish is Trinity Church in Boston's Copley Square. However, Trinity and most other parishes in the diocese have become 'higher' in the last 25 years with the introduction of Mass vestments such as the chasuble. Earlier distinctions between Low and High Church have largely disappeared across every diocese.

- The see city is Boston.
- Episcopal Divinity School was located in the diocese from its formation in 1974 until moving to New York City in 2017. Many of the diocese's clergy are alumni of EDS.
- List of Bishops in the Episcopal Diocese of Massachusetts

The diocesan offices are located at 138 Tremont Street, adjacent to the Cathedral Church of St. Paul.

== Diocesan Bishops ==
1. Edward Bass (1797-1803)
2. Samuel Parker (1804)
3. Alexander Viets Griswold (1811-1843)
4. Manton Eastburn (1843-1872)
5. Benjamin Henry Paddock (1873-1891)
6. Phillips Brooks (1891-1893)
7. William Lawrence (1893-1927)
8. Charles Lewis Slattery (1927-1930)
9. Henry Knox Sherrill (1930-1947)
10. Norman Burdett Nash (1947-1956)
11. Anson Phelps Stokes (1956-1970)
12. John Burgess (1970-1975)
13. John Bowen Coburn (1976-1986)
14. David Johnson (1986-1995)
15. M. Thomas Shaw (1995-2014)
16. Alan McIntosh Gates (2014–2024)
17. Julia Whitworth (2024-present)

== Suffragan Bishops ==
1. Samuel G. Babcock (1913-1938)
2. Raymond A. Heron (1938-1954)
3. Frederic C. Lawrence (1956-1968)
4. John M. Burgess (1962-1969)
5. Morris F. Arnold (1972-1982)
6. Barbara C. Harris (1989-2003)
7. Roy F. Cederholm Jr. (2001-2011)
8. Gayle E. Harris (2003–2023)
9. Carol Joy W. T. Gallagher (2023–present, Assistant Bishop)
