= Province 1 =

Province 1 could refer to:

- Koshi Province, Nepal, formerly known as "Province 1"
- Province 1 of the Episcopal Church, covering the New England region of the United States
