= Raymond A. Heron =

American suffragan bishop

The Right Reverend Raymond Adams Heron D.D.
- Suffragan Bishop of Massachusetts
- Church: Episcopal Church
- Diocese: Massachusetts
- Elected: 1937
- In office: 1938–1954
- Predecessor: Samuel G. Babcock
- Successor: Frederic C. Lawrence

Orders
- Ordination: June 1917 by Charles P. Anderson
- Consecration: February 16, 1938 by Henry St. George Tucker

Personal details
- Born: December 17, 1886 Antrim, Pennsylvania, United States
- Died: January 22, 1960 (aged 73) Clinton, Massachusetts, United States
- Denomination: Anglican
- Parents: Samuel Heron & Virginia Doumaux
- Spouse: Grace Newhall Hale (m. 1950)
- Children: 3

Raymond Adams Heron (December 17, 1886 – January 22, 1960) was a suffragan bishop of the Episcopal Diocese of Massachusetts from 1938 to 1954.

== Early life and education ==
Heron was born in Antrim, Pennsylvania on December 17, 1886, the son of Samuel Heron (1855-1907) and Virginia Doumaux (1859-1938). He was educated at the Blossburg, Pennsylvania High School, and then at the State College, Pennsylvania, from where he graduated in 1904. He graduated with a Bachelor of Philosophy from Hobart College in 1908, and awarded a Doctor of Divinity in 1938. He worked as a teacher in numerous private schools between 1908 and 1913. In 1913, he enrolled at the Episcopal Theological School in Cambridge, Massachusetts, and graduated with a Bachelor of Divinity in 1916.

== Ordained ministry ==
Heron was made deacon on June 1, 1916 by Bishop William Lawrence of Massachusetts, and then ordained priest in June 1917 by Bishop Charles P. Anderson of Chicago. He served as curate at St Paul's Church in Chicago between 1916 and 1920, and then rector of St Thomas' Church in Menasha, Wisconsin between 1920 and 1925. In 1925, he became rector of Grace Church in Lawrence, Massachusetts, while in 1937, he became the Archdeacon of Boston and Superintendent of the City Mission.

== Bishop ==
In 1937, Heron was elected Suffragan Bishop of Massachusetts and was consecrated on February 16, 1938 with Presiding Bishop Henry St. George Tucker as chief consecrator, in Trinity Church. He retired in 1954, and served as rector of various churches, including Trinity Church in Marlborough, Massachusetts. Heron died suddenly in Clinton Hospital, Clinton, Massachusetts, on January 22, 1960.
