= Samuel Babcock =

Samuel Babcock may refer to:

- Samuel G. Babcock (1851–1942), American bishop in the Episcopal Church
- Samuel D. Babcock (1822–1902), American banker
- Sam Babcock (1901–1970), American football player
