= St. Andrew's Episcopal Church (Hanover, Massachusetts) =

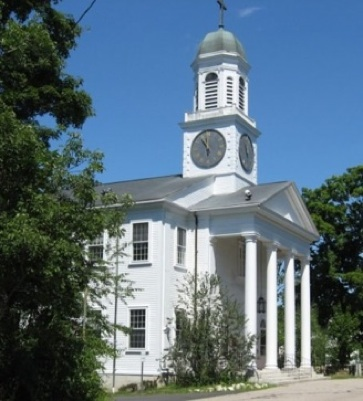

- Location within Massachusetts
- 42°6′48.5″N 70°48′54.1″W
- Location: Hanover, Massachusetts
- Country: United States
- Denomination: Episcopal
- Website: standrewshanover.org

History
- Status: Parish church
- Founded: July 28, 1725
- Founder: The Rev. Dr. Timothy Cutler
- Dedication: St. Andrew
- Consecrated: October 11, 1731 Scituate; June 11, 1811 Hanover
- Events: December 25, 1986 Church proper destroyed by fire. (Later restored.)

Architecture
- Functional status: Active

Administration
- Province: Province 1
- Diocese: Episcopal Diocese of Massachusetts
- Deanery: South Shore

Clergy
- Rector: The Rev. Kevin Holland Sparrow

St. Andrew's Episcopal Church is an historic church located in Hanover, Massachusetts. It was founded in 1725 in what is now known as Norwell, an area that was then part of Scituate). It is one of the oldest parishes in the Episcopal Diocese of Massachusetts.

The church reported 564 members in 2019 and 257 members in 2023; no membership statistics were reported in 2024 parochial reports. Plate and pledge income reported for the congregation in 2024 was $92,402 with average Sunday attendance (ASA) of 50 persons.

== History ==
The first meeting of the parish took place on July 28, 1725 at the North Meeting House in Scituate after a group of townspeople invited the Rev. Dr. Timothy Cutler of Christ Church, Boston, to lead a service and preach. Between 1727 and 1731 regular meetings of the parish took place in a private house in Scituate, led by the resident minister of Christ Church, Quincy, the Rev. Ebenezer Miller. On October 11, 1731, Miller led a service to open the first church building in front of a congregation of 150. That wooden building, located about 1 mile (1.6 km) from the present location, would serve as the parish's home until they moved to Hanover, which they did in 1811 after outgrowing the old church. Several notable figures, such as John Quincy Adams, Daniel Webster, Robert Rantoul, and Horace Mann, were at "a large all-day gathering in the cause of education" in September 1838.

The first resident minister for the parish, the Rev. Addington Davenport, was appointed in 1733. Addington remained only until 1737, but upon leaving for his next appointment made a gift of 7 acres (2.8 ha) of land "with dwelling house, barn, and other buildings thereon." Proceeds from this gift would help fund the purchase of land and building of a rectory in 1849.

On December 24, 1986, the church was destroyed by an electrical fire, but later rebuilt.

On November 6, 2011, the parish celebrated its bicentennial by displaying rare sermons and other artifacts, as well as a piano and organ concert and old church history stories. Today, the church sits on Church Street in the Four Corners village of Hanover, a scenic village that was the starting point of Hanover itself.
