= Carol Joy W. T. Gallagher =

The Right Reverend Carol Gallagher
- Canon for the Central Region
- Church: Episcopal Church
- Diocese: Massachusetts
- Appointed: September 5, 2018
- In office: 2018–present
- Previous posts: Suffragan Bishop of Southern Virginia (2002–2005); Assistant Bishop of Newark (2005–2007); Assistant Bishop of North Dakota (2008-2014); Assistant Bishop of Montana (2014-2018)

Orders
- Ordination: 1990
- Consecration: April 6, 2002 by Robert D. Rowley

Personal details
- Born: December 24, 1955 (age 70) San Diego, California, United States
- Denomination: Anglican
- Parents: Donald K. Theobald & Elizabeth Anne WalkingStick
- Spouse: Mark Gallagher
- Children: 3

Carol Joy Walkingstick Theobald Gallagher (born December 24, 1955) is an American author and a bishop in The Episcopal Church.

== Biography ==
Gallagher, born Theobald, was born on December 24, 1955, in San Diego, California, the daughter of the Rev. Donald K. Theobald and Elizabeth Anne WalkingStick. Her father served as the pastor of Huntingdon Valley Presbyterian Church from 1946 to 1952. She graduated with a Bachelor in Writing and Communication from Antioch College and in 1989 earned her Master of Divinity from the Episcopal Divinity School. She also earned a Master of Theology from Princeton Theological Seminary in 1998. In 2004 she also gained a Doctor of Philosophy in Urban Affairs and Public Policy from the University of Delaware.

Gallagher was ordained priest in 1990 and became an assistant priest at the Cathedral of the Incarnation in Baltimore and at St Martin's Church in Radnor, Pennsylvania. She was also a Priest-in-charge of Trinity Church in Collingdale, Pennsylvania. Between 1996 and 2002 she served as rector of St Anne's Church in Middletown, Delaware.

She was elected Suffragan Bishop of Southern Virginia in 2002 and was consecrated on April 6, 2002, by Robert D. Rowley, Bishop of Northwestern Pennsylvania. In 2005 she was elected Assistant Bishop of Newark while in 2007 was elected Assistant Bishop of North Dakota. In 2014 she became the Assistant Bishop of Montana while in 2018 she was appointed Canon for the Central Region in the Diocese of Massachusetts, she later became assistant bishop of the diocese. She intends to retire at the end of 2025.

== See also ==
- List of Episcopal bishops of the United States
- Historical list of the Episcopal bishops of the United States
