= Morris F. Arnold =

American bishop (1915–1992)

The Right Reverend Morris Fairchild Arnold D.D.
- Suffragan Bishop of Massachusetts
- Church: Episcopal Church
- Diocese: Massachusetts
- Elected: 1971
- In office: 1972–1982
- Predecessor: John M. Burgess
- Successor: Barbara C. Harris

Orders
- Ordination: December 1940 by Henry Knox Sherrill
- Consecration: January 29, 1972 by John E. Hines

Personal details
- Born: January 5, 1915 Minneapolis, Minnesota, United States
- Died: December 3, 1992 (aged 77) Cambridge, Massachusetts, United States
- Denomination: Anglican
- Parents: LeRoy Arnold & Kate Fairchild
- Spouse: Margaret Day Bradley (m. 1937) Harriet Borda Schmidgall (m. 1978)
- Children: 2
- Education: Williams College

Morris Fairchild "Ben" Arnold (January 5, 1915 – December 3, 1992) served as suffragan bishop of the Episcopal Diocese of Massachusetts from 1972 to 1982.

== Early life and education ==
Arnold was born on January 5, 1915, in Minneapolis, Minnesota, the son of LeRoy Arnold and Kate Fairchild. He graduated with a Bachelor of Arts magna cum laude from Williams College in 1936, and a Master of Divinity cum laude from the Episcopal Theological School in Cambridge, Massachusetts in 1940. He was awarded a Doctor of Divinity by Kenyon College in 1961 and another by Williams College in 1972.

== Family ==
Arnold married Margaret Day Bradley on June 14, 1937, and together had a son and a daughter. After their divorce, Arnold married Harriet Borda Schmidgall, in January 1978.

== Ordained ministry ==
Arnold was ordained deacon in June 1940, and priest in December 1940 by Bishop Henry Knox Sherrill of Massachusetts. He served as priest-in-charge of St John's Church in Saugus, Massachusetts between 1940 and 1943. He then served as chaplain in the United States Army and United States Army Air Forces during WWII, between 1943 and 1945, after which he became rector of Grace Church, Medford, Massachusetts. where he remained till 1950. Subsequently, he also served as chaplain at Tufts College in Boston between 1945 and 1950. He went on to become rector at Christ Church in Cincinnati, Ohio, in 1950, where he served until his election as bishop.

== Bishop ==
Arnold was initially elected as Suffragan Bishop of California on February 3, 1959, however, he declined the election. He was elected again, this time as Suffragan Bishop of Massachusetts in 1971, and accepted. He was consecrated a bishop on January 29, 1972, in Trinity Church by Presiding Bishop John E. Hines. His episcopacy was characterized with advocacy on housing, poverty and other social issues. He retired in 1982. Arnold died on December 3, 1992.

== See also ==
Succession of Bishops of The Episcopal Church (U.S.)

Episcopal Diocese of Massachusetts
