= Roy F. Cederholm Jr. =

The Right Reverend Roy Frederick Cederholm Jr. M.Div.
- Suffragan Bishop of Massachusetts
- Church: Episcopal Church
- Diocese: Massachusetts
- Elected: November 4, 2000
- In office: 2001–2011

Orders
- Ordination: May 20, 1972
- Consecration: March 24, 2001 by Douglas E. Theuner

Personal details
- Born: July 1, 1944 (age 81) Brockton, Massachusetts, United States
- Died: August 27, 2023 (aged 79) Franklin, Massachusetts, United States
- Denomination: Anglican
- Parents: Roy Frederick & Roberta L. Cederholm
- Spouse: Ruth Ann Lyon (m. 1966)
- Children: 2

Roy Frederick Cederholm Jr. (July 1, 1944 - August 27, 2023), commonly called Bud, was an American prelate of the Episcopal Church, who served as Suffragan Bishop of Massachusetts between 2001 and 2011.

== Biography ==
Cederholm was born on July 1, 1944, in Brockton, Massachusetts, the son of Roy Frederick Cederholm and his wife Roberta L. His paternal grandparents were Swedish immigrants to the United States. Cederholm was baptized at Trinity Church in Randolph, Massachusetts. He studied at Boston University and graduated with a Bachelor of Arts in mathematics. He then taught mathematics at Cohasset High School, before attending Bexley Hall in Rochester, New York, where he studied theology.

Cederholm was ordained priest on May 20, 1972, for the Diocese of Massachusetts, and served as associate rector of St Stephen's Church in Cohasset, Massachusetts, from 1971 to 1976 and then as rector of St Paul's Church in White River Junction, Vermont between 1976 and 1989. In 1989, he became rector of Christ Church in Needham, Massachusetts, where he remained till 2001. He also served as Christian education consultant in the dioceses of Massachusetts and Vermont, and was a religious education coordinator for Province 1 between 1988 and 1991. He was also elected as deputy to the General Conventions representing the Diocese of Vermont, in 1982 and 1988.

On November 4, 2000, Cederholm was elected Suffragan Bishop of Massachusetts on the sixth ballot, during a diocesan annual convention. He was consecrated at Trinity Church in Boston on March 24, 2001, by Bishop Douglas E. Theuner of New Hampshire.
