= Cathedral Church of St. Paul (Boston) =

Historic church in Boston, Massachusetts

St. Paul's Church
- Cathedral Church of St. Paul
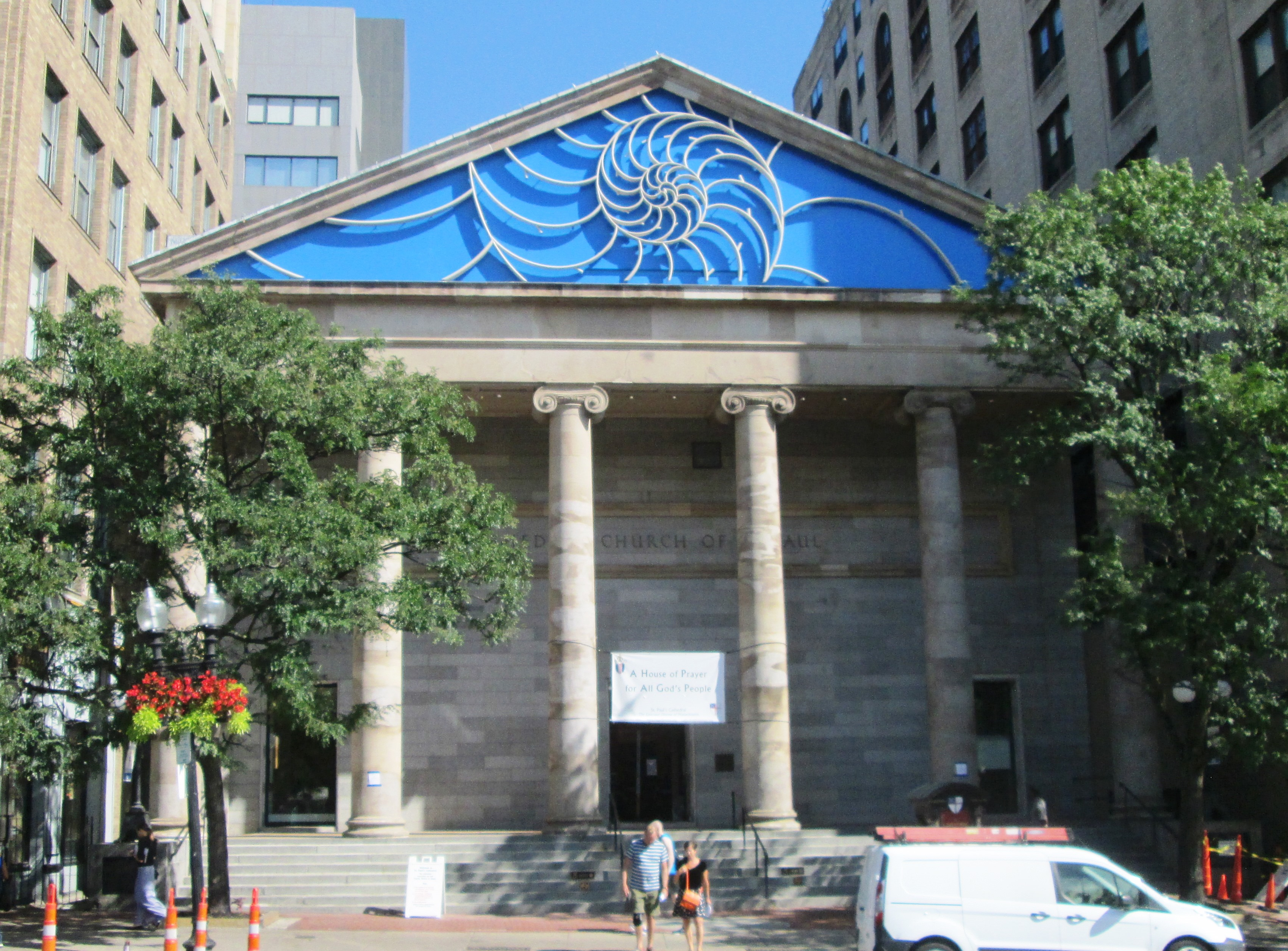
- St. Paul's Church
- 42°21′21″N 71°3′44.84″W
- Location: 138 Tremont Street; Boston, Massachusetts
- Country: United States
- Denomination: Episcopal

Architecture
- Architect(s): Alexander Parris; Solomon Willard
- Style: Greek Revival
- Completed: 1819

Administration
- District: Central
- Province: New England
- Diocese: Massachusetts
- Deanery: Boston Harbor

Clergy
- Bishop: Julia E. Whitworth
- Dean: Amy E. McCreath
- Priest(s): Liz Steinhauser; Raggs Ragan
- St. Paul's Church
- U.S. National Register of Historic Places
- U.S. National Historic Landmark
- Area: 1.3 acres (0.53 ha)
- NRHP reference No.: 70000730

Significant dates
- Added to NRHP: December 30, 1970
- Designated NHL: December 30, 1970

The Cathedral Church of St. Paul, Boston is the historic cathedral church of the Episcopal Diocese of Massachusetts. Located at 138 Tremont Street near Downtown Crossing, directly across from Boston Common and Park Street Station, the cathedral is adjacent to the diocesan offices. On April 22, 2018, Amy E McCreath was named the ninth dean and first female dean of the Cathedral Church of St. Paul, and was installed as dean on September 29, 2018. The church, designed by Alexander Parris and Solomon Willard and built in 1819, was the first Greek Revival church in New England, and was designated a National Historic Landmark in 1970 for its architectural significance.

== 19th century ==
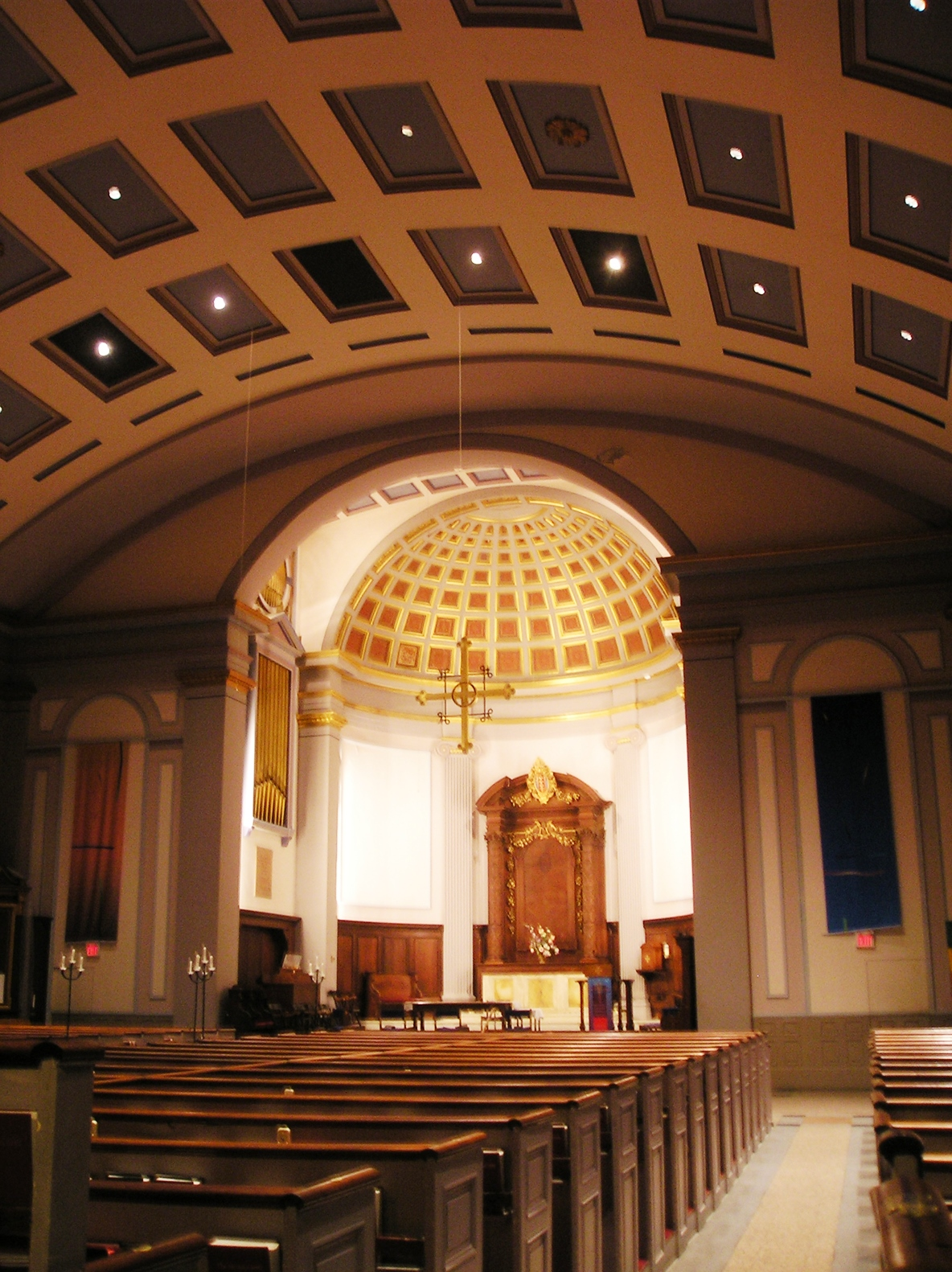
Interior in 2008, before wide-reaching interior renovations.

St. Paul's was founded in 1819. when there were two other Episcopal parishes in Boston, Christ Church (better known as Old North Church), and Trinity Church. Both had been founded before the American Revolution as part of the Church of England. The founders of St. Paul's wanted a totally American parish in Boston. The Cathedral was the first building with Greek Revival architecture in Boston.

Unusually for that time, for a church building, St. Paul's was built in the Greek revival style. Its architects were Alexander Parris, best known for Quincy Market, and Solomon Willard, best known for the Bunker Hill Monument. Its granite exterior and sandstone temple front have changed little since its construction. A carving of St. Paul preaching before King Agrippa II was intended to be placed in the pediment over the entrance but was never executed.

Congregants included Daniel Webster.

== 20th century ==
In 1912, after its neighborhood had become mainly non-residential, the diocese named St. Paul's as its cathedral. Then its chancel was remodeled with a coffered and gilded half-dome, elaborately carved wood reredos, a chancel organ and choir benches. The new chancel's architect was Ralph Adams Cram, known for such landmark Gothic churches as All Saints', in the Ashmont neighborhood of Boston, and the Cathedral of St. John the Divine in New York City.

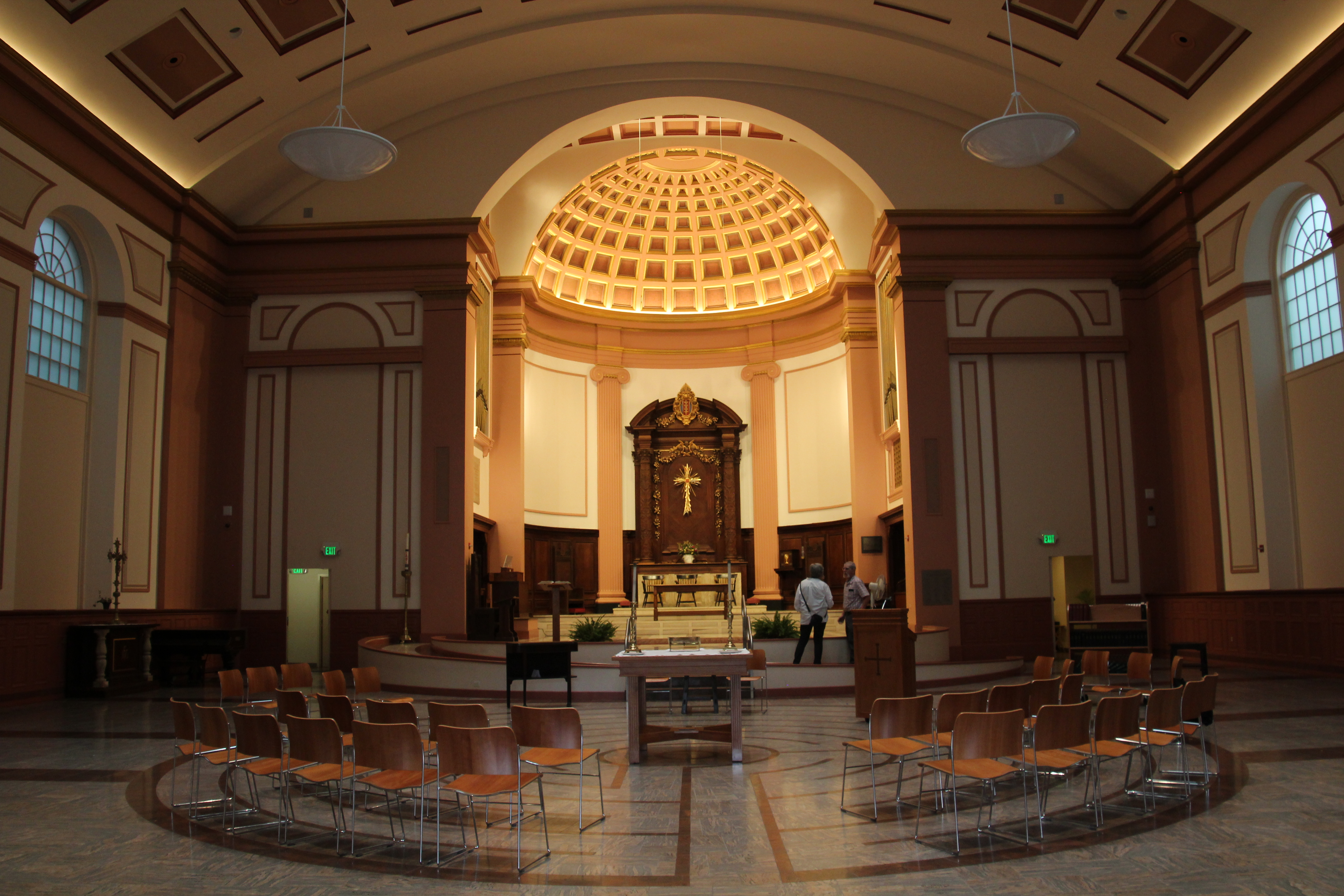
The Cathedral's interior arranged for Sunday communion, 2018

From the 1880s to 1980, St. Paul's had a choir of men and boys, who sang introits, hymns and anthems at Sunday morning worship services. Their founding choirmaster was Warren Andrew Locke, concurrently the organist and choirmaster at Harvard University from 1882 to 1910. The choir's final organist and choirmaster was Thomas Murray, who later became University Organist and Professor of Music at Yale University.

== Design ==
The design in the center of the cathedral is The Labyrinth, which is meant to meditate and was modeled after one in Ravenna, Italy. The stones that make up the outside of the building were from St Paul's Cathedral's in London and St. Botolph's in Boston, England. In 2014, the Cathedral began extensive interior renovations which were complete during the fall of 2015. During this time the skylights on the ceiling were added for natural light, the curving ramp surrounding the altar was made accessible, and stained glass windows and other features were remodeled inside the chapel. Additionally, the Cathedral's pews were removed so that worship could be centered around the altar, which was moved to the center of the space.

== Ministers ==
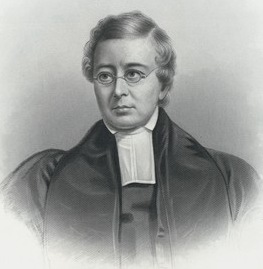
Samuel Farrar Jarvis, 19th century

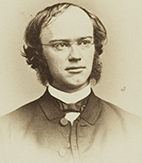
Treadwell Walden (photo, 1860s)

- Sam Jarvis, 1820–1825
- Alonzo Potter, 1826–1831
- John S. Stone, 1832–1841
- Alexander Vinton, 1842–1858
- William Nicholson, c. 1860s
- Treadwell Walden, 1873
- William Newton, 1877–1882
- Frederick Courtney, 1882 accepts call to be the eight rector
- John Summerfield Lindsey, 1889 ninth rector
- Thomas Augustus Jaggar, 1906 tenth rector
- William Faulkerner, 1908 eleventh rector
- Edmund Swett Rousmaniere, 1909 installed as the twelfth and final rector, and named as the first Dean of the Cathedral 1912
- Philemon Fowler Sturges, 1926 named as the second Dean of the Cathedral
- Edwin Jan Van Etten, 1940 the third Dean of the Cathedral
- Charles Henry Buck, 1953 the fourth Dean of the Cathedral
- John Bowen Coburn, 1980, elected fifth Dean of the Cathedral
- Thomas Kennedy, 1985 sixth Dean of the Cathedral
- David Elliot Johnson, 1986 named himself seventh Dean of the Cathedral,
- Jep Streit, 1996 installed as the eight Dean of the Cathedral
- Amy E. McCreath, 2018 installed as the ninth, and first female Dean of the Cathedral

== Gallery ==
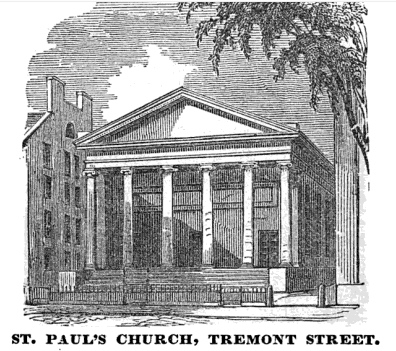
1851

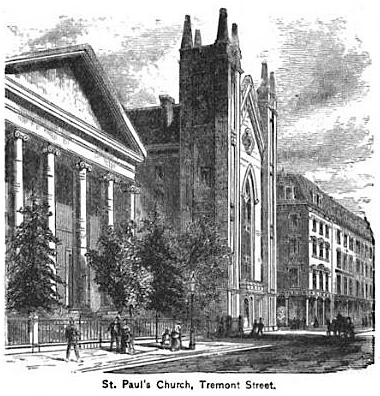
c. 1881

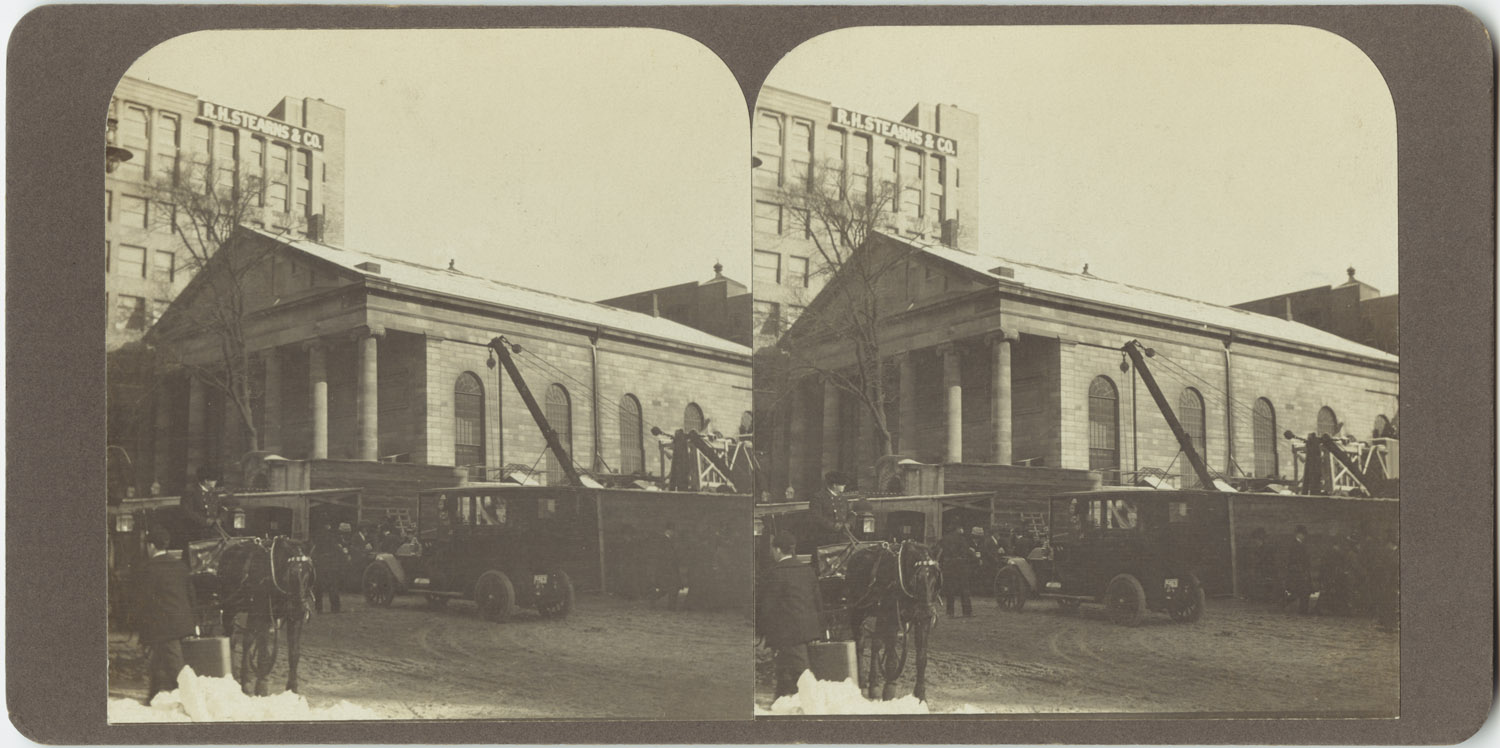
c. 1908

2008

== See also ==
- List of the Episcopal cathedrals of the United States
- List of cathedrals in the United States
- List of National Historic Landmarks in Boston
- National Register of Historic Places listings in northern Boston, Massachusetts
