= Charles Lewis Slattery =

American Episcopal bishop (1867–1930)

The Right Reverend Charles Lewis Slattery D.D.
- Bishop of Massachusetts
- Church: Episcopal Church
- Diocese: Massachusetts
- Elected: June 1, 1927
- In office: 1927–1930
- Predecessor: William Lawrence
- Successor: Henry Knox Sherrill
- Previous post: Coadjutor Bishop of Massachusetts (1922–1927)

Orders
- Ordination: June 8, 1895 by William Lawrence
- Consecration: October 31, 1922 by William Lawrence

Personal details
- Born: December 9, 1867 Pittsburgh, Pennsylvania, United States
- Died: March 12, 1930 (aged 62) Boston, Massachusetts, United States
- Buried: Mount Auburn Cemetery
- Denomination: Anglican
- Parents: George S. L. Slattery; Emma M. Hall
- Spouse: Sarah Lawrence (m. 1923)
- Education: Harvard University; Episcopal Theological School

Charles Lewis Slattery (December 9, 1867 – March 12, 1930) was the Episcopal Bishop of Massachusetts, a prominent theological writer in the early 20th century, and a leader of the Broad Church movement within the American Episcopal Church. He headed the commission that eventually published the 1928 Book of Common Prayer (BCP), which governed worship in Episcopal churches until 1979. Although he rejected the label of "liberal," his amendments to the Anglican liturgy steered the Episcopal Church away from the doctrines of original sin and total depravity, and (if tentatively) towards gender equality. He also served as the president of the board of trustees of Wellesley College and helped establish Brooks School.

== Early life and education ==
Slattery was born in Pittsburgh, Pennsylvania, to the Reverend George Sidney Leffingwell Slattery and Emma McClellan Slattery. He attended East High School in Denver, Colorado, where he graduated with the highest grade point average in the school history. He then graduated summa cum laude from Harvard College in 1891, and obtained a bachelor's of divinity from Episcopal Theological School in 1894. ETS was a stronghold of the Broad Church movement within the Episcopal Church, which encouraged Episcopalians to tolerate theological liberalism at a time when the Episcopal clergy was predominantly conservative.

== Career ==
=== Early career ===
Slattery was ordained to the diaconate in 1894 and to the priesthood in 1895. He quickly advanced through the Episcopal Church hierarchy.

From 1894 to 1896, Slattery taught English at Groton School in Groton, Massachusetts, an Episcopal high school run by fellow ETS alum and broad churchman Endicott Peabody. Because Groton, curiously, also served as the local parish church at the time, his teaching post allowed him to obtain his first experience as a parish priest at Groton's satellite church, St. Andrew's of Ayer, Massachusetts.

From there, he served as dean of the Cathedral of Our Merciful Saviour in Faribault, Minnesota (1896–1907) and rector of Christ Church Cathedral in Springfield, Massachusetts (1907–1910). At Christ Church, he developed a reputation for supporting Protestant ecumenicism.

=== Grace Church ===
In 1910, Slattery became the rector of Grace Church in Manhattan, New York. At the time, Grace Church was one of the richest and most influential parish churches in the Episcopal Church; when Slattery left New York in 1922, he was the second-highest-paid Episcopal minister in the United States. An active parish priest, Slattery reportedly wrote over 2,500 personal notes to his parishioners a year. From 1914 to 1930, he also led the Church Congress of the United States, an organization that supported the Broad Church tendency within the Episcopal Church. He continued his ecumenical outreach to other Protestant denominations, such as Presbyterians, Methodists, Baptists, and Lutherans.

In 1919, Slattery applied for the position of Bishop of New York, but lost the election to Charles Sumner Burch. Ironically, Burch died just one year later; Slattery performed the burial rites at his funeral. He applied for the episcopate a second time after Burch's death, but once again lost the election, this time to William T. Manning, the conservative High Church rector of Trinity Church in Manhattan. In a narrow contest, he lost the clergy vote 126-109 and the lay vote 75–64. Certain electors suggested that Slattery lost because William Randolph Hearst's newspapers attacked the England-born Manning for not being American enough, angering the electorate and causing them to back Manning out of spite. (Manning had previously condemned Hearst's isolationist coverage of World War I.)

In 1919, Slattery was also offered the deanship of the Episcopal Theological School, but he declined the position.

=== 1928 Book of Common Prayer ===
In 1922, following the death of Cortlandt Whitehead, Slattery became the chairman of the Episcopal Church commission tasked with revising the 1892 Book of Common Prayer, which had changed "little of substance" from the 1789 edition, and whose liturgy and catechism were considered theologically conservative. The commission had been operating since the 1913 General Convention, but successive General Conventions had repeatedly rejected and/or stalled most of its proposed revisions. According to Henry Washburn, dean of the Episcopal Theological School, "[t]o Slattery, more than to any one else, the general features of the revision are due."

The commission's proposed revisions to the 1892 BCP were highly contentious among theologians. When the commission was convened, it was instructed to refuse to "consider or report[]" any "proposition involving the Faith and Doctrine of the Church." However, it "took this charge rather loosely." Although Slattery rejected the label of "liberal," he took the modernist side of the Fundamentalist-Modernist Controversy; shortly before publishing the 1928 BCP, he declared that the Episcopal Church has "no fundamentalists in the sense in which that word is used to-day." The commission's revisions made "far-reaching, and in some instances radical," changes to both language and theology, decisively moving away from the concept of total depravity. Slattery explained that he wanted to "substitute[] New Testament trust for Old Testament fear" and to recognize modern "aspirations ... for social justice, good government, and world brotherhood."

Examples of the 1928 BCP changes include:

- Removed the word "obey" from the bride's portion of the marriage service (the groom had never been required to say this)
- Removed the Imprecatory Psalms (e.g. "Let his children be fatherless, and his wife a widow" from Psalm 109) from the liturgy
- Removed the word "militant" from the phrase "Let us pray for the whole state of Christ's Church militant"
- Removed "forasmuch as all men are conceived and born in sin" from the baptismal service
- Moderated "have mercy upon us miserable sinners" to "have mercy upon us"
- Moderated "Enter not into judgement with thy servants, who are vile earth, and miserable sinners ... who meekly acknowledge our vileness" to "who meekly acknowledge our transgressions"
- Authorized religious burial services for persons who had committed suicide
- Allowed priests to lead the congregation in reciting the Ten Commandments once a month, as opposed to once a week
- Provided priests with flexibility to adjust the liturgy, including "many opportunities for shortening the Services" (as Slattery himself put it)
- Simplified the language of the Episcopal catechism to make it understandable to children

Slattery's influence on the BCP continued after his death; the commission's secretary, John W. Suter Sr., served as Custodian of the Standard Book of Common Prayer from 1934 to 1942.

=== Diocese of Massachusetts ===
Bishop Manning was only 55 years old at the time of his elevation, and served for another twenty-five years. With no future prospects for advancement in New York, Slattery returned to Massachusetts in 1922 as the coadjutor bishop of the Episcopal Diocese of Massachusetts, a title that, in Episcopal Church parlance, ensured he would become the Bishop of Massachusetts as soon as William Lawrence retired. In 1923, he married Sarah Lawrence, the founder of the Junior League of Boston; coincidentally, she was also Bishop Lawrence's daughter. They had no children.

Slattery became Massachusetts' acting bishop in 1925 and permanent bishop in 1927. As bishop, Slattery "continued the same liberal tradition in theology as his immediate predecessors." He served until his death from a heart attack in 1930.

== Other ==
Slattery and his wife's family were heavily associated with Wellesley College, the women's liberal arts college in Wellesley, Massachusetts. He served as the president of Wellesley's board of trustees, as did his father-in-law. His wife Sarah was also a Wellesley trustee.

Shortly after moving to Massachusetts, he helped establish Brooks School, an Episcopalian boarding school in North Andover, Massachusetts. Brooks was set up by a coalition of Groton School teachers, donors, and alumni, and as a former Groton master turned Episcopal minister, Slattery was tapped to serve on the founding board of trustees. He also served as a trustee of Boston University.

Slattery received honorary doctoral degrees from the University of the South at Sewanee, Trinity College, Hartford, and his alma maters Episcopal Theological School and Harvard University.
