= John Bowen Coburn =

American bishop (1914–2009)

The Right Reverend John Bowen Coburn D.D., J.C.D.
- Bishop of Massachusetts
- Church: Episcopal Church
- Diocese: Massachusetts
- Elected: 1976
- In office: 1976–1986
- Predecessor: John Burgess
- Successor: David Elliot Johnson

Orders
- Ordination: July 1943 by Benjamin M. Washburn
- Consecration: October 2, 1976 by John Allin

Personal details
- Born: September 27, 1914 Danbury, Connecticut, United States
- Died: August 8, 2009 (aged 94) Bedford, Massachusetts, United States
- Denomination: Anglican
- Parents: Aaron C. Coburn & Eugenia Bowen Woolfolk
- Spouse: Ruth Alvord Barnum (m. 1941)
- Children: 5
- Education: Princeton University (BA)

John Bowen Coburn (September 27, 1914 – August 8, 2009) was bishop of the Episcopal Diocese of Massachusetts from 1976 to 1986.

== Early life and education ==
Coburn was born on September 27, 1914, in Danbury, Connecticut, the son of the Reverend Aaron Cutler Coburn (1884-1942) and Eugenia Bowen Woolfolk (1880-1958). He studied at Wooster School (a school founded by his father) and graduated in 1931. Later he studied at Princeton University from which he graduated with a Bachelor of Arts in politics in 1936. Between 1936 and 1939, he taught English and Biology at Robert College in Istanbul, Turkey. After that he studied at the Union Theological Seminary from which he earned his Bachelor of Divinity in 1942. He was awarded a total of ten honorary Doctor of Divinity degrees from different universities, a Doctor of Sacred Theology from Berkeley College in 1958 and a Doctor of Canon Law from Kenyon College and General Theological Seminary in 1968.

== Ordained ministry ==
Coburn was ordained deacon on January 3, 1943, by Bishop Benjamin M. Washburn of Newark in Trinity Cathedral. He was appointed as assistant at Grace Church in New York City and was ordained priest in July of that year. In 1944 he became a Navy chaplain on an attack transport in the Pacific during WWII. Upon his return, he became rector of Grace Church in Amherst, Massachusetts and subsequently served as the chaplain at Amherst College. He was appointed Dean of Trinity Cathedral in Newark, New Jersey in 1953 and remained there till 1957, after which he became Dean of the Episcopal Theological School. In 1958 he was elected to become Bishop Coadjutor of the Episcopal Diocese of Washington but he turned it down. In 1968 he went to Harlem, New York and served as teacher at the Street Academy Urban League. In 1969 he became rector of St James' Church in New York City. He served as deputy of the General Convention in 1955, 1961, 1964, 1967, 1969, 1970, 1973 and then as president of the bicameral General Convention's House of Clerical and Lay Deputies between 1967 and 1976.

== Bishop ==
Coburn was again elected bishop, this time of Massachusetts, an election which he accepted. He was consecrated on October 2, 1976, with Presiding Bishop John Allin as chief consecrator. In 1980 he was elected as the fifth dean of Cathedral Church of St. Paul (Boston) and served in this role concurrent with being bishop of the diocese. As Bishop of Massachusetts he ordained his son Michael and his daughter-in-law Ann Struthers to the priesthood in 1977. He retired in 1986 and died at his home in Bedford, Massachusetts on August 8, 2009.

== Family ==
Coburn married Ruth Alvord Barnum on May 26, 1941. They had five children together.
