= Thomas Murray (organist) =

American organist

- Born: 1943 (age 82–83); Los Angeles, California, United States
- Genre: Romantic
- Occupation: Organist
- Instrument: Pipe organ
- Years active: 1966–2019

Thomas Mantle Murray (born October 6, 1943, in Los Angeles, California) is an American organist, known as an interpreter of Romantic organ music. He was a professor of Music and university organist at the Yale School of Music from 1981 until his retirement in 2019. He is also Principal Organist and Artist in Residence at Christ Church in New Haven, Connecticut.

== Life and career ==
Thomas Murray studied organ with Clarence Mader at Occidental College. He studied choral conducting as well, and graduated with his B.A. from that university in 1965. The next year, he won the National Competition of the American Guild of Organists. From 1966 to 1973, he was organist at Immanuel Presbyterian Church of Los Angeles, and from 1975 to 1980 he was choirmaster and organist of the Cathedral Church of St. Paul, Boston. In 1981, he joined the music faculty at Yale University, becoming university organist in 1990. He retired from that position at the end of Yale's 2018–19 academic year.

Murray has also been active as a concert organist for more than 40 years. In the United States, he has appeared as a soloist with the Pittsburgh, Houston, Milwaukee and Portland Symphonies and with the National Chamber Orchestra in Washington, D.C. He has also performed in most European countries, South America, Australia and Japan, and was featured as a soloist with the Moscow Chamber Orchestra at the Lahti Festival in Finland.

Thomas Murray is best known for his performances of Romantic organ works and transcriptions of works originally written for other instruments. He is especially knowledgeable about the organ music of Elgar, Mendelssohn, Franck, and Saint-Saëns, and his recordings of organ works by Mendelssohn and Elgar are regarded as authoritative. He has also frequently performed works by Johann Sebastian Bach, though his interpretation of Classical and Baroque music reflects just as much an idiosyncratic and individual approach as a historically informed one.

As university organist at Yale, he has access to the famed Skinner organ in Woolsey Hall, one of the largest and most important Romantic instruments in the US, and has made numerous recordings on this instrument. Additionally, he has recorded numerous organs by the Hook firm, one of the most prominent organ-building companies in American during the 19th century.

When not teaching or performing, Murray can usually be found pursuing his other passion: antique cars, particularly Rolls-Royces.

== Honors ==
Thomas Murray's recognitions include:

- American Guild of Organists International Artist of the Year (1986)
- Honorary Fellowship in the Royal College of Organists in England (2003)
- Gustave Stoeckel Award for Distinguished Teaching from the Yale University School of Music (2005)

== Discography ==
- An Elm Court Musicale
- Art of the Symphonic Organist, Volume 3
- Edward Elgar at Woolsey Hall
- Historic Organs of Boston
- Historic Organs of Buffalo
- Historic Organs of Chicago
- Historic Organs of Colorado
- Historic Organs of Connecticut
- Historic Organs of Indiana
- Murray at Immaculate Conception
- Organ Music of Henri Mulet
- Organ Music of Mendelssohn & Schumann
- The French Collection
- The Longwood Gardens Organ, Volume 1
- Thomas Murray at Cincinnati Museum Center
- Thomas Murray plays Lemare
- Thomas Murray plays Woolsey Hall

== Reviews ==
"The performances of all of these were those of an organist whose skill extended beyond the playing of the notes to authoritative control of a very large instrument in a vast echoing space."

"Mr. Murray played this, and the whole program, with almost a conductor's sense of tempo relationships and long-term pacing. His registrations were apt and had, without ostentation, a bold quality of definition and specificity about them."

"Known for his grasp of the Romantic organ and its literature, recitalist Thomas Murray surprisingly redirected his programming as well as his performance from a deeper personal expression to a statement of fine-tuning. High art comes to mind. His suppleness often created the illusion that he was at an instrument that could change its touch at the drop of a hat. The pliable beat he conjured, too, was a feat in and of itself. How he knew when to move the beat this way or that, this nanosecond or that millisecond left me in marvelous mystery."

"I don't believe any single purchase would be a better introduction to the pipe organ..." (Review of Thomas Murray's CD "Great Organ Builders of America: A Retrospective (Volume 14): Newberry Memorial Organ, Woolsey Hall, Yale University, New Haven, Connecticut")

“Murray’s performance and his handling of the immense resources of the Woolsey Hall organ are beyond superlatives ... the shape of every phrase, the use of every color ... could not be more perfect.” (American Record Guide review of Thomas Murray's 1995 CD, Edward Elgar at Woolsey Hall: Music for Organ)

== Students ==
Thomas Murray's organ students include Ken Cowan, head of the organ program at Rice University's Shepherd School of Music, Christian Lane, former Vice President of the American Guild of Organists, and Paul Jacobs, chairman of the organ department at the Juilliard School of Music in New York City.
