= John Burgess (bishop) =

American bishop

The Right Reverend John Melville Burgess D.D.
- Bishop of Massachusetts
- Church: Episcopal Church
- See: Massachusetts
- In office: 1970–1975
- Predecessor: Anson Phelps Stokes Jr.
- Successor: John Bowen Coburn
- Previous posts: Suffragan Bishop of Massachusetts (1962-1969); Coadjutor Bishop of Massachusetts (1969-1970)

Orders
- Ordination: January 25, 1935 by John N. McCormick
- Consecration: June 7, 1962 by Arthur C. Lichtenberger

Personal details
- Born: March 11, 1909 Grand Rapids, Michigan, United States
- Died: August 24, 2003 (aged 94) Vineyard Haven, Massachusetts, United States
- Parents: Theodore Thomas Burgess & Ethel Inez Beverly
- Spouse: Esther J. Taylor
- Children: 2
- Education: University of Michigan (BA, MA); Episcopal Theological School (MDiv)

John Melville Burgess (March 11, 1909 – August 24, 2003) was the twelfth bishop of the Episcopal Diocese of Massachusetts in Boston, Massachusetts from 1970 to 1975 and the first African American to head an Episcopal diocese.

== Biography ==
Burgess was the son of Theodore Thomas (a dining car waiter on the Pere Marquette Railway) and Ethel Inez Beverly (a kindergarten teacher) Burgess. He attended Central High School in Grand Rapids, Michigan. He received a B.A. in 1930 and an M.A. in 1931 from the University of Michigan. Burgess then earned a Master of Divinity degree from the Episcopal Theological School in Cambridge, Massachusetts in 1934, of which he was one of the first black graduates.

After beginning his ministry in his home parish of St. Philip's Episcopal; a Colored Episcopal Mission in Grand Rapids and then Cincinnati, Ohio, Burgess became the Episcopal chaplain at Howard University in Washington, D.C. in 1946. In 1951, he became the first African American to serve as canon at Washington National Cathedral. In 1956, Burgess moved to the Episcopal Diocese of Massachusetts as an archdeacon of Boston's parishes and missions and superintendent of what became named the Episcopal City Mission. He was the first black archdeacon in New England.

In 1962, Burgess was elected on the first ballot as a suffragan bishop of the Episcopal Diocese of Massachusetts, becoming the first African American to serve the Episcopal Church as spiritual leader in a predominantly white diocese. When Burgess was installed as diocesan bishop in 1970, he became the first African American to head an Episcopal diocese.

Burgess was known for his efforts to revitalize urban ministry, confront racism in public schools, support prison reform, build bridges between black and white communities, and improve the efficiency of the diocese. He was an important ecumenical leader in maintaining peace during the Boston school desegregation crisis. His wife, Esther Burgess, was also active as a peaceful demonstrator against segregation.

Following his retirement in 1975, Burgess taught pastoral theology at Berkeley Divinity School at Yale and Yale Divinity School. He was awarded honorary degrees from the University of Michigan, Boston College, Assumption College, the University of Massachusetts, Trinity College, Northeastern University, and St. Augustine's College.

== Selected works ==
- Burgess, John M. (1982). Black Gospel/White Church. New York, NY: Seabury Press. ISBN 0-8164-0511-5.

== Endnotes ==
Episcopal Church (USA) titles
Preceded by Anson Phelps Stokes Jr.	Bishop of Massachusetts; 1970–1975	Succeeded by John Bowen Coburn
