= Manton Eastburn =

American bishop

The Right Reverend Manton Eastburn D.D.
- Bishop of Massachusetts
- Church: Episcopal Church
- Diocese: Massachusetts
- In office: 1843–1872
- Predecessor: Alexander Viets Griswold
- Successor: Benjamin Henry Paddock
- Previous post: Coadjutor Bishop of Massachusetts (1842-1843)

Orders
- Ordination: November 13, 1825 by John Henry Hobart
- Consecration: December 29, 1842 by Alexander Viets Griswold

Personal details
- Born: 2 February 1801 Leeds, West Yorkshire, England
- Died: 11 September 1872 (aged 71) Boston, Massachusetts, United States
- Buried: Mount Auburn Cemetery
- Denomination: Anglican
- Parents: James Eastburn & Charlotte Browne
- Spouse: Mary Glover (d. 1855); Mary Jean Head
- Education: Columbia University

Manton Eastburn (1801 in Leeds, England – 1872) was an Episcopal bishop who served as the fourth Bishop of Massachusetts from 1843 till 1872.

== Biography ==
After graduation from Columbia University, he studied at the General Theological Seminary of the Episcopal Church in the United States before ordination as deacon on May 17, 1822 and priest on November 13, 1825 by Bishop John Henry Hobart of the Diocese of New York. After serving at Christ Church, New York, New York, he became the first rector of the Church of the Ascension, New York. On December 29, 1842, he was consecrated as assistant Bishop of Massachusetts; he served as diocesan bishop on the death of Alexander Viets Griswold from 1843 until his death.

Eastburn attended the first Lambeth Conference in 1867 and was associated with the evangelical school of Episcopalian churchmanship. His tenure as diocesan bishop was marked by considerable conflict over Tractarianism both locally and nationally, particularly at the Church of the Advent in Boston.

He is buried at St. Paul's Church, in Dedham, Massachusetts.

Episcopal Church (USA) titles
Preceded by Alexander Viets Griswold	Bishop of Massachusetts; 1843–1872	Succeeded by Benjamin Henry Paddock
