= Julia Whitworth =

American Episcopal bishop

The Very Reverend Julia E. Whitmorth
- 17th Bishop of Massachusetts
- Church: Episcopal Church
- Diocese: Massachusetts
- Elected: May 2024
- Appointed: October 2024
- Installed: 2024
- Predecessor: Alan McIntosh Gates
- Previous posts: Assistant Rector, St. James’s Church, West Hartford, Connecticut (2010-2012) Canon for Liturgy and the Arts, Cathedral Church of St. John the Divine, New York, New York (2013-2016) Rector, Trinity Church, Indianapolis, Indiana (2016-2024)

Orders
- Ordination: September 2010
- Consecration: October 19, 2024 by Bishop Michael Curry

Personal details
- Denomination: Anglican
- Spouse: Ray Neufeld
- Children: 3 children
- Education: Bachelor of Arts, Dartmouth College, 1993 Master of Arts New York University/Tisch School of the Arts Master of Divinity, Union Theological Seminary, 2010

Julia E. Whitworth is an American Episcopal bishop currently serving as the 17th Bishop of Massachusetts, having previously been rector of Trinity Church in Indianapolis.

== Education ==
Born in Richmond, Virginia, Whitworth graduated from Dartmouth College in 1993 with a bachelor's degree in drama and English, and later studied for a master's degree at New York University Tisch School of the Arts. She received a Master of Divinity degree from Union Theological Seminary in 2010.

== Career ==
Whitworth began her career as a drama instructor at the Tisch School of the Arts and was a visiting lecturer at Mount Holyoke College.

Having been ordained as a priest in 2010, she served as assistant rector of St. James's Church in West Hartford, Connecticut, until 2012, and as canon for liturgy and the arts at the Cathedral of St. John the Divine in New York City from 2013 to 2016, when she became rector of Trinity Church, Indianapolis.

On May 18, 2024, she was elected to serve as the 17th Bishop of Massachusetts − the first woman to serve in that role. Her consecration took place at Trinity Church, Boston, on October 19, 2024, in the presence of the Presiding Bishop of the Episcopal Church, the Most Rev. Michael Curry.

== Family ==
Whitworth is married to Ray Neufeld, an artist and designer, with whom she has three children.

Episcopal Church (USA) titles
Preceded by Alan M. Gates	17th Bishop of Massachusetts; 2024–present	Succeeded by {{{after}}}
