= David Elliot Johnson =

American Episcopalian bishop (1933-1995)

The Right Reverend David Elliot Johnson
- Bishop of Massachusetts
- Church: Episcopal Church
- Diocese: Massachusetts
- Elected: 1985
- In office: 1986–1995
- Predecessor: John Bowen Coburn
- Successor: Tom Shaw
- Previous post: Coadjutor Bishop of Massachusetts (1985-1986)

Orders
- Ordination: January 8, 1962 by Robert R. Brown
- Consecration: October 5, 1985 by John Allin

Personal details
- Born: April 17, 1933 Newark, New Jersey, U.S.
- Died: January 14, 1995 (aged 61) Framingham, Massachusetts, U.S.
- Denomination: Episcopalian
- Parents: Theodore Eames Johnson (father); Frances Lysett Wetmore (mother)
- Spouse: Joyce Joanne Evans (m. 1958)
- Children: 3
- Education: Trinity College; Virginia Theological Seminary

David Elliot Johnson (April 17, 1933 – January 14, 1995) was the 14th Bishop of Massachusetts in The Episcopal Church.

== Early life ==
Johnson was born in Newark, New Jersey. His parents were Frances Lysett (née Wemore) and Theodore Eames Johnson.

He graduated from Trinity College in Hartford with a Bachelor of Arts in 1955. There, he was a member of St. Anthony Hall. After college, he spent three years in the U.S. Air Force Strategic Air Command as a pilot. He then went to Virginia Theological Seminary, where he received a Master of Divinity degree in 1961.

== Career ==
After ordination to the diaconate in 1961 and the priesthood in 1961, he served as rector of the Church of the Good Shepherd in Little Rock, Arkansas from 1961 to 1965. From 1965 to 1972, he was the vicar of St Martin's Church in Fayetteville, Arkansas. He served as rector of Calvary Church in Columbia, Missouri from 1972 to 1976. He was called to the Diocese of Southwest Florida in 1976 to become Next, he was rector of St. Boniface in Sarasota, Florida in 1976, serving there until 1985.

Johnson was elected Coadjutor Bishop of Massachusetts on May 18, 1985. He was consecrated on October 5, 1985 by Presiding Bishop John Allin at the Cathedral of the Holy Cross. Johnson became diocesan bishop in 1986 of the largest diocese in the Episcopal Church.

As bishop, he regularly preached about world peace, the arms race, and AIDS and was traditionally known to visit two parishes on Sundays. He was also a supporter of the ordination of women as priests and bishops but did not support ordaining gay and lesbian persons. Barbara Harris became the first female suffragan bishop of the Episcopal Church under his tenure. He founded the DoveMass program which recruited volunteers to work in public schools.

His episcopacy was characterized with a number of clashes with some congregations, notably in 1993 when he was involved in a public dispute with Emmanuel Episcopal Church, Boston, over their music program. He was also in conflict with the Church of the Advent after criticizing how the church was governed. In return the church filed suit asking for a court injunction to keep him from interfering.

In November 1994, Johnson announced that he intended to retire on June 5, 1995.

== Death ==
Johnson married Joyce Joanne Evans in 1958. They had three children: Stephanie, Scott, and Elizabeth. In 1994, they sold their house in Framingham, Massachusetts, and had purchased a retirement home in Kansas.

On January 15, 1995, Johnson was found dead at the age of 61 years in his apartment in Framingham, Massachusetts. It was revealed that he died from a single gunshot to the chest. It was concluded that Johnson died by suicide using a .22-caliber rifle. There was no suicide note. However, the church confirmed that Johnson suffered from depression and had attempted suicide on another occasion. His funeral took place in Trinity Church in Boston, presided by Presiding Bishop Edmond L. Browning on January 19, 1995.

Two weeks after his death, the Episcopal Church revealed that Johnson had been involved in several extramarital affairs throughout his ministry. These findings were based on reports by women who came forward. Bishop Browning's statement indicated that some of the relationships "appear to have been of the character of sexual exploitation". One challenge for the women was that Johnson was the person who was supposed to handle such cases in his district. No formal charges against Johnson were pressed by the church.
