= Henry Knox Sherrill =

American bishop (1890–1980)

The Most Reverend Henry Knox Sherrill
- 20th Presiding Bishop of the Episcopal Church
- Church: Episcopal Church
- Installed: January 1, 1947
- Term ended: November 14, 1958
- Predecessor: Henry St. George Tucker
- Successor: Arthur C. Lichtenberger
- Previous post: Bishop of Massachusetts (1930–1947)

Orders
- Ordination: May 9, 1915 by William Lawrence
- Consecration: October 14, 1930 by James De Wolf Perry

Personal details
- Born: November 6, 1890 Brooklyn, New York, United States
- Died: May 11, 1980 (aged 89) Boxford, Massachusetts, United States
- Buried: Cone Hill Cemetery in Richmond, Massachusetts
- Denomination: Anglican
- Parents: Henry Williams Sherril, Maria Knox
- Spouse: Barbara Harris
- Children: 4
- Education: Yale University (BA); Episcopal Theological School (BDiv)

Henry Knox Sherrill (November 6, 1890 – May 11, 1980) was an Episcopal bishop. He was the 20th Presiding Bishop of the Episcopal Church from 1947 to 1958, having previously served as Bishop of Massachusetts (1930–1947).

== Biography ==
Henry Knox Sherrill was born in Brooklyn, New York, to Henry Williams and Maria (Prue) Knox Mills Sherrill. His father died when he was ten-years-old, and his mother raised him to be religiously observant. He graduated from Brooklyn's Polytechnic Preparatory School in 1906, after which he attended the Hotchkiss School in Lakeville, Connecticut, for a year. At age sixteen, he entered Yale College, from where he obtained his Bachelor of Arts degree in 1911. While a student at Yale, he taught Sunday school at St. Paul's Church in New Haven and experienced a call to the ordained ministry. One of his greatest mentors at Yale was Henry Sloane Coffin, a Presbyterian theologian and educator. He earned his Master of Divinity degree from the Episcopal Theological School in Cambridge, Massachusetts, in 1914. Sherrill was ordained to the diaconate on June 7, 1914, and to the priesthood on May 9, 1915. He then served as an assistant minister at Trinity Church in Boston until 1917, when he became a Red Cross chaplain at Massachusetts General Hospital. He later became an Army chaplain, with the rank of First Lieutenant, at Base Hospital 6 in Talence, France.

Upon his return from the war service, he served as rector of the Church of Our Saviour in Brookline from 1919 to 1923. In 1921, he married Barbara Harris, with whom he had four children: Henry Williams, Edmund Knox, Franklin Goldthwaite, and Barbara Prue. He then returned to Boston's Trinity Church, where he had begun his ministry, as rector. In addition to his duties as rector, he served as a professor at the Episcopal Theological School and the Boston University School of Theology, and was active in various civic and religious organizations, including the Greater Boston Council of Churches. He also proved to be a gifted fundraiser, increasing Trinity's average annual contribution to the national church from $30,000 to $35,000—one of the largest of any Episcopal parish in the country at that time. In 1928, he was elected Coadjutor bishop of the Diocese of Pennsylvania, but declined the position.

On Oct. 14, 1930, Sherrill was consecrated the ninth Bishop of Massachusetts. He served in that position until June 1, 1947, when he resigned to become Presiding Bishop. He served on the President's Committee on Civil Rights in 1946 for President Harry Truman. From Jan. 1, 1947, until Nov. 14, 1958, he was Presiding Bishop of the Episcopal Church. At the General Convention of 1943, a canon was passed which required the Presiding Bishop to tender to the House of Bishops the resignation of his previous jurisdiction to take effect on the date of assuming the office of Presiding Bishop or no later than six months thereafter.

Sherrill was the first Presiding Bishop chosen after this canon was passed. While Presiding Bishop he led in the organization of the Episcopal Church Foundation and the establishment of the Seabury Press. He decided to move the 1955 General Convention from Houston to Honolulu, due to the former city's segregation. Sherrill was the founding President of the National Council of Churches from 1950 to 1952, and one of the presidents of the World Council of Churches from 1954 until 1961. He resigned as Presiding Bishop in 1958 for reasons of health.

In 1953, Sherrill delivered the benediction at the inauguration of President Dwight D. Eisenhower.

In 1959, he led the consecration of his son, Edmund Knox Sherrill, as an Anglican bishop in Brazil.

== Death ==
Sherrill died in Boxford, Massachusetts, and is buried at Cone Hill Cemetery in Richmond, Massachusetts.

== Legacy ==
Sherrill House, a nursing and rehabilitation center in Jamaica Plain, Boston, is named in his honor.

Sherrill Hall, a freshman dormitory at Hobart College, is also named in his honor.

The American operatic baritone Sherrill Milnes was named after him (see Milnes' memoirs, American Aria).

== See also ==
- List of presiding bishops of the Episcopal Church in the United States of America
- List of Episcopal bishops of the United States
- Historical list of the Episcopal bishops of the United States

Episcopal Church (USA) titles
Preceded by Henry St. George Tucker	20th Presiding Bishop; January 1, 1947 – November 14, 1958	Succeeded by Arthur C. Lichtenberger
Preceded by Charles Lewis Slattery	Bishop of Massachusetts; 1930–1947	Succeeded by Norman Burdett Nash
