= Province 1 of the Episcopal Church =

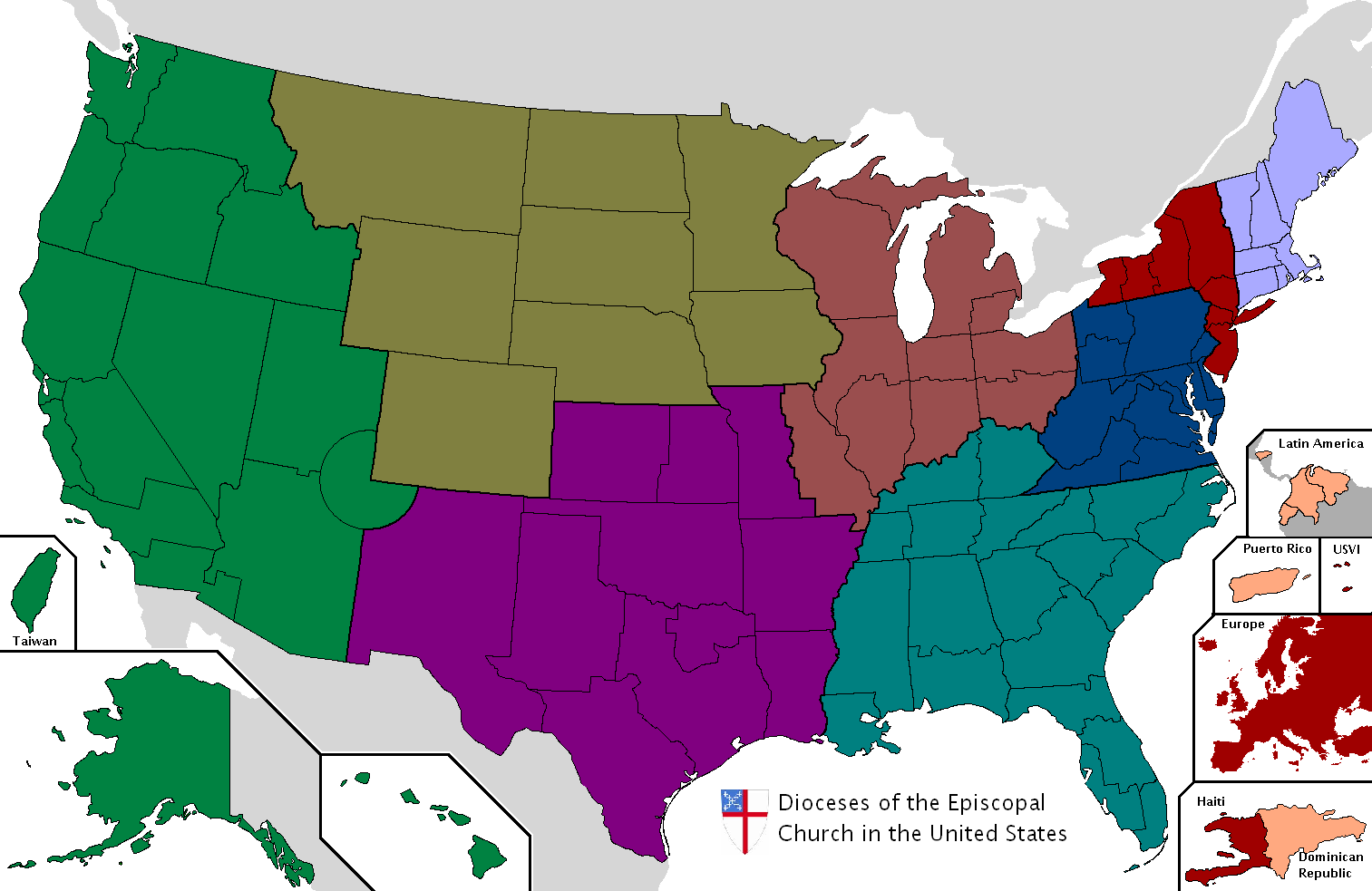
Province I of the ECUSA

Province 1 (I), also called the Province of New England, is one of nine ecclesiastical provinces making up the Episcopal Church in the United States of America. It is composed of the seven dioceses of New England.

Statistically, the province reported 172,437 members in 2015 and 110,209 members in 2025. Plate and pledge income for the 556 filing congregations of the province in 2025 was $104,776,666. Average Sunday attendance (ASA) was 29,866 persons. This was a decrease from ASA of 48,242 in 2015.

== Dioceses ==
The seven dioceses of Province 1 are:

- Diocese of Connecticut
- Diocese of Maine
- Diocese of Massachusetts
- Diocese of New Hampshire
- Diocese of Rhode Island
- Diocese of Vermont
- Diocese of Western Massachusetts

They include both the largest diocese (in number of members) (Diocese of Massachusetts) and the oldest diocese (Diocese of Connecticut) in the Episcopal Church.

== Officials ==
Retired bishop Stephen T. Lane of the Diocese of Maine serves as president, and Kit Wang of the Diocese of Massachusetts serves as vice president.

== References and external links ==
- ECUSA Province Directory
- Province I website
