= William Lawrence (bishop) =

American Episcopal bishop

The Right Reverend William Lawrence D.D., LL.D.
- Bishop of Massachusetts
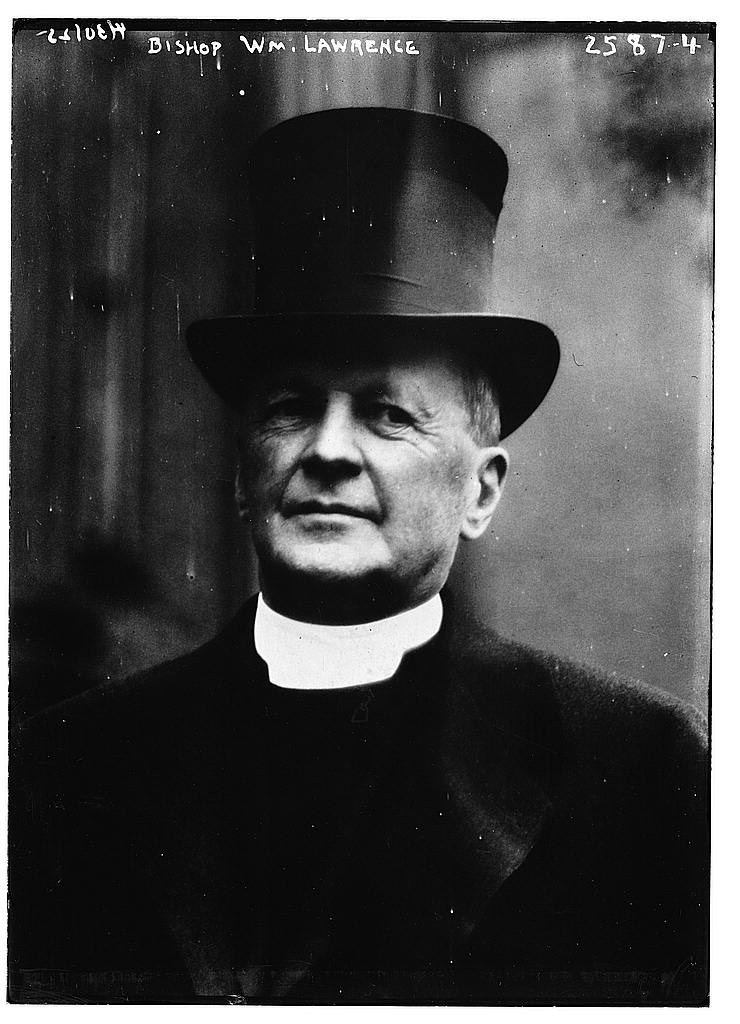
- Lawrence pictured between 1910 and 1915
- Church: Episcopal Church
- Diocese: Massachusetts
- Elected: May 4, 1893
- In office: 1893–1927
- Predecessor: Phillips Brooks
- Successor: Charles Lewis Slattery

Orders
- Ordination: June 11, 1876 by Benjamin Henry Paddock
- Consecration: October 5, 1893 by John Williams

Personal details
- Born: May 30, 1850 Boston, Massachusetts, United States
- Died: November 6, 1941 (aged 91) Milton, Massachusetts, United States
- Buried: Mount Auburn Cemetery
- Denomination: Anglican
- Parents: Amos Adams Lawrence & Sarah Elizabeth Appleton
- Spouse: Julia Cunningham (d. 1900)
- Children: 5
- Education: Harvard University; Harvard Divinity School

William Lawrence (May 30, 1850 – November 6, 1941) was elected as the 7th Bishop of the Episcopal Diocese of Massachusetts (1893–1927). Lawrence was the son of the notable textile industrialist Amos Adams Lawrence and a member of the influential Boston family, founded by his great-grandfather and American revolutionary, Samuel Lawrence. His grandfather was the famed philanthropist Amos Lawrence.

== Early life ==
Lawrence was born on May 30, 1850, in Boston, Massachusetts. He was the son of Sarah Elizabeth Appleton (1822–1891) and Amos Adams Lawrence (1814–1886), a notable textile industrialist, and a member of the influential Boston family, founded by his great-grandfather and American revolutionary, Samuel Lawrence. His grandfather was the famed philanthropist Amos Lawrence.

He graduated from Harvard College, as was the tradition in his family. He earned his Doctor of Divinity (D.D.) degree from Harvard Divinity School in 1897. In 1910, he was honored with a Doctor of Laws (LL.D.) degree from Harvard presented by his cousin and then president of Harvard, A. Lawrence Lowell.

== Career ==
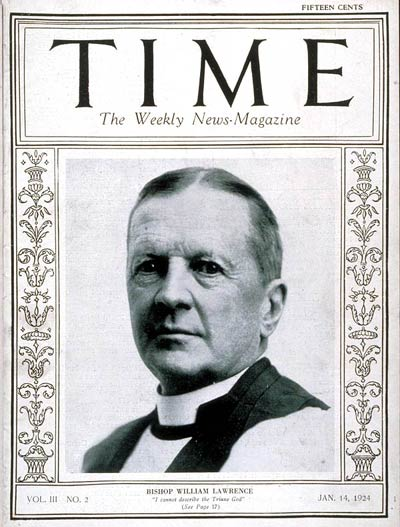
Time cover, January 14, 1924

Lawrence is best known for founding the church pension system. He was also known as "the banker bishop" because of his wealth and successful fund-raising drives. The financier J. P. Morgan, Jr. served as treasurer of the Church Pension Fund from its founding in 1918.

While bishop emeritus, Lawrence was involved in an effort to proposition a new Book of Common Prayer to the Church of England. Also, while in retirement, he realized the need for a chapel at Massachusetts General Hospital and in the late 1930s, as the White Building was under construction, convinced of the importance of faith and spirit in healing, he sent letters to friends of the hospital asking for their support "in this bit of pioneer hospital work." Over eight hundred people of all faiths responded.

He was elected a member of the American Antiquarian Society in 1899. In 1926, Lawrence published his autobiography, Memories of a Happy Life. Several of his sons, following in his footsteps, also became bishops of the Episcopal Church.

In 1913 he founded a boy's summer camp in Gloucester Massachusetts, serving as its first director. In 1926 the William Lawrence Camp moved to Center Tuftonboro New Hampshire where it continues to operate today.

=== Famous quote ===
The "banker bishop" is quoted as having said, "In the long run it is only to the man of morality that wealth comes... We, like the Psalmists, occasionally see the wicked prosper, but only occasionally. Godliness is in league with riches."

== Legacy ==
Lawrence was married to Julia Cunningham (1853–1927), the daughter of Frederic Cunningham and Sarah Maria (née Parker) Cunningham. Together, they were the parents of:

- Marianne Lawrence (1875–1974), who married Harold Peabody (1880–1961)
- Julia Lawrence (1877–1962), who married Morton Lazell Fearey (1876–1948)
- Sarah Lawrence (1878–1950), who founded the Junior League of Boston in 1906, and married Bishop Charles Lewis Slattery (1867–1930) in 1923.
- Ruth Lawrence (1886–1973), who married Lansing P. Reed
- William Appleton Lawrence (1889–1968), who was elected 3rd Bishop of the Episcopal Diocese of Western Massachusetts (1925–41).
- Elinor Lawrence (1894–1963), who married Lewis Hunt Mills (1892–1953)
- Frederic Cunningham Lawrence (1899–1989), who was elected suffragan bishop of the Episcopal Diocese of Massachusetts (1956–68).

Lawrence died on November 6, 1941, at the age of 91 in Milton, Massachusetts.

== Works ==
- Lawrence, William (1914). Memoir of John Pierpont Morgan (1837–1913): written in the form of a letter to Herbert L. Satterlee dated January 6, 1914.
- A Life of Roger Wolcott, Governor of Massachusetts (1902)

Episcopal Church (USA) titles
Preceded by Phillips Brooks	7th Bishop of Massachusetts; 1893–1927	Succeeded by Charles Lewis Slattery
Awards and achievements
Preceded by William G. McAdoo	Cover of Time Magazine; 14 January 1924	Succeeded by Henry Cabot Lodge
