= Episcopal Divinity School =

Theological school in New York City

Coordinates: 40°48′14″N 73°57′43″W

- Type: Private seminary
- Established: 1974; 52 years ago
- Affiliations: Episcopal Church
- Endowment: $77.3 million (April 30, 2024)
- President: Lydia Kelsey Bucklin
- Location: New York City, New York, United States
- Campus: Urban
- Website: eds.edu

The Episcopal Divinity School (EDS) is an unaccredited theological school in New York City. Established to train people for ordination in the American Episcopal Church, the seminary eventually began training students from other denominations. The school currently does not enroll any seminarians, and states that it is currently "exploring multiple models for theological education."

In 2025, EDS claimed $2,279,607 in revenue and $97,864,397 in assets as a 501(c)(3) Public Charity.

For most of its history, EDS was headquartered in Cambridge, Massachusetts. From 2018 to 2023, it was affiliated with Union Theological Seminary in New York City.

EDS and its predecessors established a reputation for progressive teaching and action on issues of civil rights and social justice. Its faculty and students were directly involved in many of the social controversies surrounding the Episcopal Church in the latter half of the 20th century and at the start of the 21st. From 1930 to 1964, three out of the four presiding bishops of the Episcopal Church were alumni of EDS' predecessor Episcopal Theological School: James De Wolf Perry, Henry Knox Sherrill, and Arthur Lichtenberger.

== History ==
=== Predecessors ===
The Episcopal Divinity School (EDS) was founded in 1974 by combining the Episcopal Theological School (ETS) and the Philadelphia Divinity School (PDS). ETS's first dean was John Seely Stone, a former PDS lecturer.

==== Philadelphia Divinity School ====
The Philadelphia Divinity School was founded in Philadelphia, Pennsylvania in 1857 as the Divinity School of the Protestant Episcopal Church by Alonzo Potter, Bishop of Pennsylvania.

==== Episcopal Theological School ====
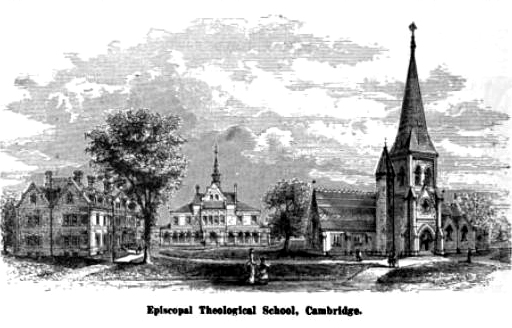
Episcopal Divinity School, 19th century

The Episcopal Theological School was founded in Cambridge, Massachusetts in 1867 by Boston businessman Benjamin Tyler Reed. Although ETS' first dean, John Seely Stone, was part of the evangelical wing of the Anglican church, the school developed into a stronghold of the Broad Church movement and welcomed liberal and progressive views. It was "the first Episcopal theological seminary to welcome modern biblical scholarship," and in 1924 its faculty asked its alumni priests to accommodate congregants who did not believe in the virgin birth. In 1941, ETS became the first Episcopal seminary to appoint a female full-time faculty member (Adelaide Teague Case).

According to one alumnus, the school's reputation for theological progressivism was so strong that "candidates for the Episcopal ministry who did not have independent financial means avoided the Cambridge seminary lest they become so infected with its social heresies that they could not hold suburban pulpits." In 1919, ETS offered its deanship to alumnus C. L. Slattery, who declined the position; nine years later, a committee led by now-Bishop Slattery published a revision to the Book of Common Prayer which made "far-reaching, and in some instances radical," changes to both language and theology, decisively moving away from the concept of total depravity.

The founders chose Cambridge, Massachusetts for its proximity to Harvard University. ETS provided an Anglican alternative to Harvard's divinity school and Memorial Church, both of which were predominantly Unitarian at the time. ETS students were allowed to cross-register in Harvard courses and to use the divinity school library. After retiring from ETS, Henry Washburn served as the director of Harvard Memorial Church from 1940 to 1950.

=== Merger and creation of EDS ===
PDS and ETS merged in 1974. Both institutions were facing bankruptcy at the time. Merging the two institutions and consolidating operations on ETS's Cambridge campus allowed the schools to save money while combining their financial endowments. PDS sold its five-acre campus to the University of Pennsylvania, and the PDS campus currently hosts an elementary school assisted by the University of Pennsylvania.

The unified EDS granted degrees until 2017. As an independent seminary, EDS offered Master of Divinity (M.Div.), Master of Arts in Theological Studies (MATS), and Doctor of Ministry (D.Min.) degree programs, as well as a certificate in Anglican studies program. It inherited ETS's relationship with Harvard Divinity School, which included cross-registration. It was a member of the Boston Theological Institute, a consortium of seminaries and divinity schools that share library and academic resources and allow cross-registration for courses.

In 2008, EDS sold seven of its thirteen buildings to Lesley University for $33.5 million to help pay off outstanding debts. The two institutions agreed to share part of the remaining EDS campus, offer cross-registration, and pool resources.

Beginning in 2011, EDS allowed members of the Metropolitan Community Church to train at EDS for ordination in their church, receiving specific instruction on their church's polity.

=== Affiliation with Union Theological Seminary and move to New York ===
In the 21st century, EDS was impacted by broader forces (primarily declining enrollment) affecting many Episcopal seminaries. For example, from 2022 to 2024, the General Theological Seminary leased its New York City campus to Vanderbilt University, refocused its course offerings on primarily-online masters' programs, and agreed to an arrangement with deeper-pocketed Virginia Theological Seminary under which VTS' president took over GTS.

Over time, EDS increasingly relied on its endowment to cover operating deficits. From 2011 to 2016, the endowment declined from $70.2 million to $53 million. The school warned that the endowment would eventually become unable to cover future deficits.

In 2016, the school's board of trustees decided that the school would cease granting degrees after the end of the 2016–17 academic year. At the time, the school had four full-time faculty and 35 full-time enrolled students. The school issued a statement explaining that "[e]nding unsustainable spending is a matter of social justice."

After several months of evaluating how it could continue to support the school's mission of theological education, the board of trustees decided to sell its Cambridge campus and to affiliate EDS with Union Theological Seminary (UTS) in New York City. Through this arrangement, Episcopal seminarians would enroll at UTS in the "EDS at Union Anglican Studies Program," earn a M.Div. from UTS, and fulfill requirements for ordination in the Episcopal Church. The institutions signed an 11-year affiliation agreement, starting in 2018. As of December 2022, EDS-at-UTS educated 21 students.

As part of the move from Cambridge, EDS terminated its employment contracts with all faculty and staff, and provided them with severance packages. In 2018, Lesley University exercised its right of first refusal to purchase the remainder of the EDS campus.

=== Independent, non-degree-granting institution ===
On March 31, 2023, Union and EDS announced that they were discontinuing their formal affiliation after 5 years, less than halfway into the initial term of the agreement. EDS discontinued its degree-granting programs. M.Div. students in the EDS-at-UTS program transitioned into the UTS Anglican Studies Program. In the meantime, EDS has relocated to temporary offices at the Cathedral of St. John the Divine in New York. It offers some programming in New York and online.

In 2024, EDS was currently "exploring multiple models for theological education." It states that it "seeks collaborative opportunities to prepare and equip clergy and lay people for transformative and diverse leadership roles."

In August 2024, Lydia Kelsey Bucklin was appointed as EDS' new president and dean, with a directive to "develop and implement a strategic and operational plan" for the school. Although EDS currently does not educate any students, its financial endowment stood at $77.3 million as of April 30, 2024, which included the sale price of the Cambridge campus.

== Social issues ==
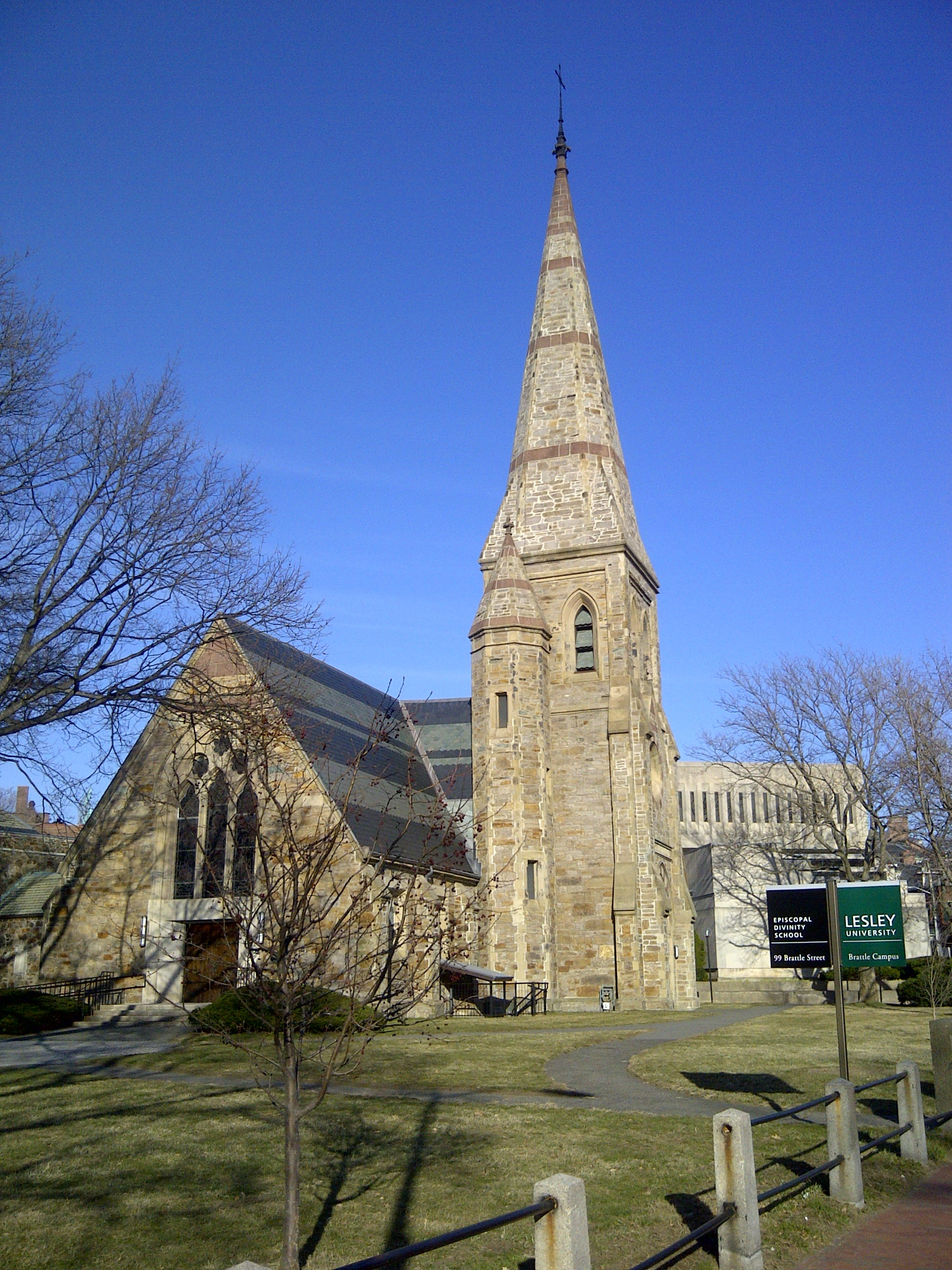
St. John's Chapel at EDS

PDS and ETS had both attempted to insulate themselves from affiliations with partisan factions within the church. Where other seminaries that existed or would come to exist within the Episcopal Church often affiliated themselves with either the high church or low church movements, PDS and ETS focused on broad social and academic matters rather than issues of churchmanship as such. This may affiliate them with broad church movements, although neither institution explicitly identified themselves as such. EDS has continued in that tradition.

PDS, ETS and EDS have all been known for their focus on pastoral action around progressive social issues.

=== African-American education ===
From its inception, PDS admitted and trained African-American students, which was not done anywhere else in the world. The Episcopal Church itself, originally as the Church of England under the Bishop of London in British colonies in North America, had early seen several attempts from within at including African-American and indigenous American peoples in the full life of the church; the first person to be baptized in the Church of England in North America was a Native American person. Social values, particularly with the rise of racial slavery in North America, meant that there were considerable obstacles to such practices, and debates over whether it was right to baptize African-American slaves were controversial. Clergy who baptized slaves were often expelled from their parishes by the wealthy vestries which held their contracts. The church was largely controlled by affluent whites and despite rare actions by clergy, African-American slaves and ex-slaves were largely excluded from participation in the life of the church.

In 1968, ETS hired its first African-American professor, Robert Avon Bennett.

=== Education and ordination of women ===
In the 1880s, PDS begin training women as deaconesses. In 1929 women were first admitted at PDS in small numbers to theological education programs designed for those preparing to teach religion in colleges.

ETS became the first Episcopal seminary to hire a woman, in 1941, to its full-time faculty.

In 1974, after the formation of EDS, 11 women known as the Philadelphia Eleven were "irregularly" ordained to the priesthood of the Episcopal Church. Several EDS faculty members took part in the ordination and two of the new priests, Carter Heyward and Suzanne Hiatt, were employed as EDS faculty. The affiliation of EDS with this ordination would cause many bishops to refuse to send their postulants for ordination to EDS to receive a theological education. EDS retained a reputation for controversy stemming from this incident even after the Episcopal Church as a whole voted to ordain women to the priesthood in 1976. EDS quickly became the first Episcopal seminary to have women teaching in all fields of study.

=== Civil rights ===
In 1956, Bishop Henry Knox Sherrill, who graduated from ETS in 1914, spoke out at a press conference on September 18, 1956, in favor of racial integration for the whole church. He said, “integration in the whole church is inevitable; it is fundamental to the heart of the Gospel.”

In 1964, members of the ETS community marched in Boston to protest the racially motivated Birmingham church bombings. In the following year, ETS students and faculty traveled to Alabama to take part in the Selma to Montgomery marches. Several students sought to return to Alabama after the Selma marches to continue to work for racial integration in that state. Jonathan Myrick Daniels, one of those students, was shot and killed outside a store in Hayneville, Alabama, while trying to protect a young African-American woman, Ruby Sales, from a gunman. Sales would go on to attend ETS herself and work for civil rights, founding an inner-city mission dedicated to Daniels who is remembered as a martyr of the Episcopal Church and is remembered regularly at EDS.

=== LGBT rights ===
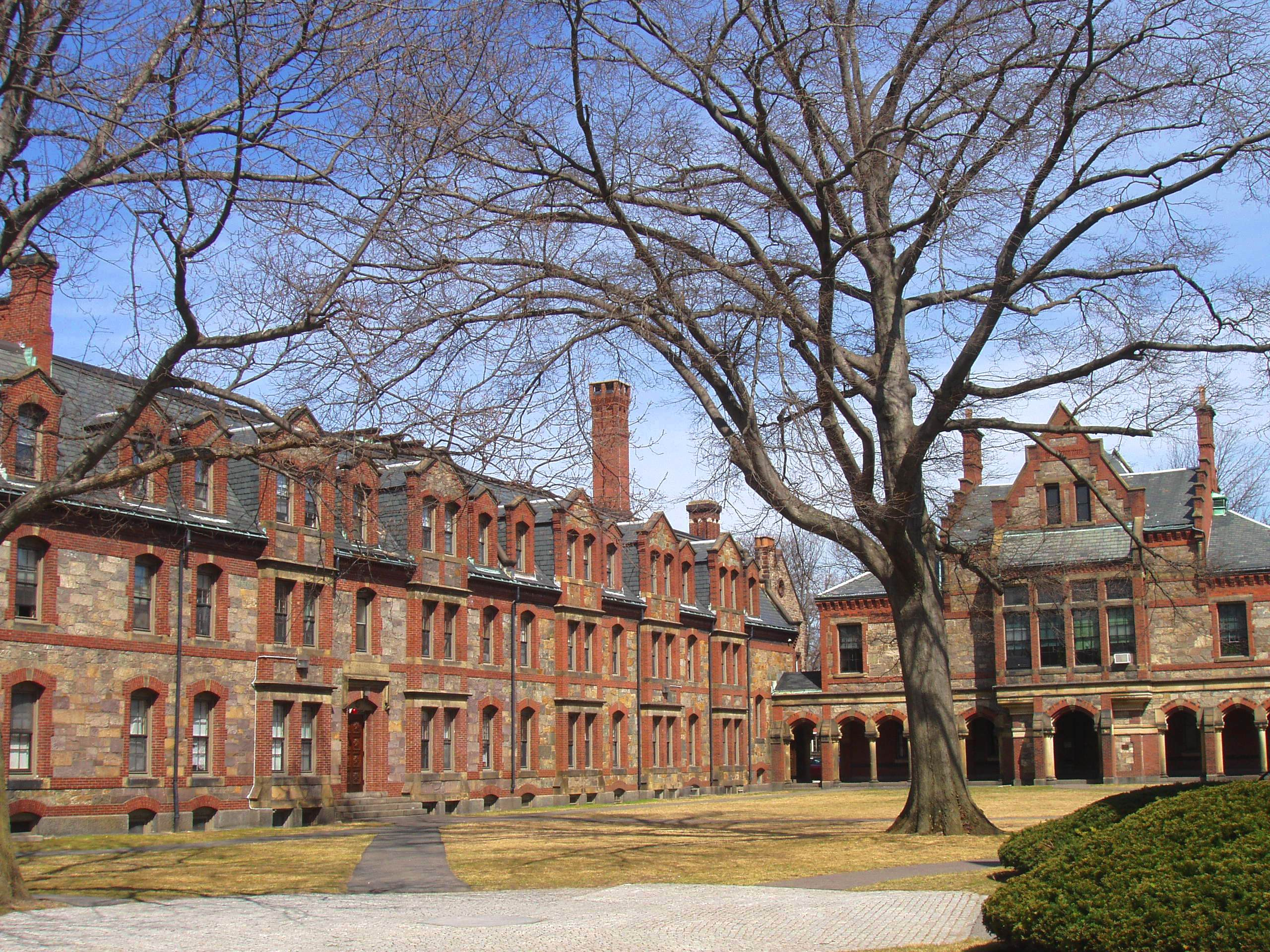
Lawrence and Reed Halls on EDS's Flemish style quadrangle

In the 1960s, ETS students who were suspected of being homosexual were dismissed, but as church and social opinion began to slowly turn in favor of tolerance of homosexuals, EDS would become a leading center of studies on LGBT issues within the Episcopal Church and the wider Anglican Communion. In 1974, ethics professor William Hayden McCallum came out as a gay man to the school community. Associate professor and priest Carter Heyward came out as a lesbian to the church in a nationwide publication in 1979. By the 1980s, EDS permitted same-sex couples to live in campus housing as it did heterosexual couples previously. In 1995, when St. John's Memorial Chapel was opened to marriage services by Dean William Rankin, both heterosexual marriages and same-sex unions were permitted, contrary to the trend in the Episcopal Church at the time. In 1999, the school's then dean, Steven Charleston, was the author of the Cambridge Accord, an attempt to reach consensus over the human rights of homosexual people, notwithstanding differences within the Anglican Communion over the moral status of homosexual acts. In 2009, Katherine Hancock Ragsdale became the Dean of EDS, the first openly lesbian person to be dean of an Episcopal seminary. However, in 2015, she indicated she would not seek an extension to her term as Dean – which expired at the end of June – after disputes with faculty regarding changes to the residential seminary model.

== Leadership ==
=== Episcopal Theological School - Deans ===
- 1869–1876 John Seely Stone
- 1876–1889 George Zabriskie Gray
- 1889–1893 William Lawrence '75
- 1894–1919 George Hodges
- 1920–1940 Henry Bradford Washburn
- 1940–1944 Angus Dun
- 1944–1956 Charles Taylor
- 1957–1968 John B. Coburn
- 1969–1974 Harvey H. Guthrie

=== Episcopal Divinity School - Deans ===
- 1974–1976 Harvey H. Guthrie and Edward Harris
- 1976–1985 Harvey H. Guthrie
- 1985–1993 E. Otis Charles
- 1993–1998 William Rankin
- 1999–2008 Steven Charleston
- 2009–2015 Katherine Hancock Ragsdale
- 2018–2023 Kelly Brown Douglas

=== Episcopal Divinity School - President-Deans ===
- 2023–2024 Kelly Brown Douglas (interim president)
- 2024–present Lydia Kelsey Bucklin (dean and president)

== See also ==
- List of Episcopal Divinity School people
