= List of St. Paul's School alumni =

The following is a list of alumni of St. Paul's School. SPS is a preparatory, coeducational boarding school in Concord, New Hampshire, affiliated with the Episcopal Church.

== A ==
- Will Ahmed, CEO and founder of WHOOP
- JD Angerhofer]], founding engineer at Kojo (FKA Agora)
- Robert Allerton SPS Form of 1889, philanthropist; gave Allerton Garden on Kauai to the nation
- Michael J. Arlen, author of Exiles and Passage to Ararat (winner of the National Book Award); longtime staff writer and television critic for The New Yorker
- Norman Armour 1905, United States ambassador
- John Jacob Astor IV, member of the Astor family who died on the RMS Titanic

== B ==
- Hobey Baker 1909, collegiate hockey player and World War I pilot
- E. Digby Baltzell 1932, sociologist responsible for popularizing the term "WASP"
- Matthew Winthrop Barzun, U.S. ambassador
- Alexis I. du Pont Bayard, lieutenant governor of Delaware
- Roland W. Betts 1964, CEO of Chelsea Piers, L.P. and major Republican Party contributor
- Anthony Joseph Drexel Biddle, Jr. 1915, ambassador during World War II to eight governments in exile
- Charles E. Bohlen, diplomat
- Francis Bohlen, Algernon Sydney Biddle professor of law at the University of Pennsylvania Law School
- James C. H. Bonbright 1921, United States Ambassador to Portugal and Sweden
- James Bond, did not graduate; namesake for Ian Fleming's fictional spy
- Marshall Latham Bond, owner of sled dog inspiration of Jack London's The Call of the Wild
- Daniel Baugh Brewster, U.S. senator from Maryland
- Godfrey Brinley, tennis player; 1885 U.S. Open runner-up; longtime SPS faculty member

== C ==
- Lorene Cary 1974, author of Black Ice, an autobiography detailing her experiences with the school; founder of Art Sanctuary in Philadelphia
- Alfred M. Coats (1869–1942), Scottish-American industrialist from Providence, R.I.
- Francis Parkman Coffin, electrical engineering pioneer
- Joey Corcoran 2020, Canadian football player
- Parker Corning 1893, U.S. congressman from New York
- Archibald Cox 1930, Watergate Special Prosecutor
- Lacy Crawford, author of Notes on a Silencing

== D ==
- Frank H. Davis, Vermont state treasurer
- Clarence Day 1892, humorist, author, and playwright
- Alexis Denisof, television, film and stage actor (Angel, Buffy the Vampire Slayer)
- Harmar D. Denny, Jr., U.S. congressman from Pennsylvania
- Charles S. Dewey, U.S. congressman
- Marshall Dodge 1953, Yankee humorist
- Lucy Barzun Donnelly 1991, award-winning film and television producer
- Angier Biddle Duke, chief of protocol for the Kennedy administration; ambassador to El Salvador, Spain, Denmark, and Morocco
- Annie Duke, 1983, tournament poker champion, winner of the World Series of Poker Tournament of Champions (2004)

== E ==
- The Baron Eden of Winton, 9th and 7th Bt, British Conservative politician
- Grenville T. Emmet 1893, U.S. ambassador to the Netherlands and Austria
- John Franklin Enders 1915, Nobel laureate in physiology/medicine
- William R. Everdell, historian and author

== F ==
- Timothy Ferriss, entrepreneur and bestselling author of The 4-Hour Workweek
- Hamilton Fish, Jr. 1890, first American to die while charging San Juan Hill in the Spanish–American War
- William Henry Furness III 1883, explorer and ethnologist

== G ==
- James Rudolph Garfield, politician, son of President James A. Garfield
- Rufus Gifford 1992, U.S. Ambassador to Denmark
- Jeff Giuliano 1998, National Hockey League (NHL) player
- Malcolm Gordon 1887, member of the U.S. Hockey Hall of Fame
- Mark Gordon c. 1975, Wyoming state treasurer, rancher-businessman
- J. Peter Grace 1932, industrialist and sportsman
- Archibald Gracie IV, attended United States Military Academy (did not graduate), RMS Titanic survivor, author of Titanic: A Survivor's Story
- Eliza Griswold 1991, journalist/poet, author of New York Times bestseller The Tenth Parallel: Dispatches from the Fault Line Between Christianity and Islam
- Frank Tracy Griswold III 1955, 25th presiding bishop of the Episcopal Church
- A. R. Gurney 1948, playwright and novelist

== H ==
- Jeff Halpern 1994, NHL player
- Edward Harkness 1893, philanthropist after whom the Harkness table is named
- Huntington Hartford 1929, A&P heir, graduated after 8 years
- William Randolph Hearst 1881, newspaper publisher (did not graduate)
- Kelly Heaton 1990, sculptor, seer, scientist, and spiritualist known for her combination of visual art with analog electrical engineering
- Tommy Hitchcock, Jr. 1918, most celebrated American polo player of all time and World War I fighter-pilot (left school as president of Sixth Form)
- H. Allen Holmes 1950, U.S. ambassador to Portugal
- Amory Houghton Sr. 1917, U.S. ambassador to France
- Amory "Amo" Houghton Jr. 1945, U.S. congressman (R-NY); CEO of Corning Glass Works
- Clement Hurd 1926, author and illustrator of children's books, including Goodnight Moon

== J ==
- Annie Jacobsen 1985, investigative journalist and New York Times bestselling author

== K ==
- Michael Kennedy 1976, son of Robert F. Kennedy
- John Kerry 1962, U.S. senator (D-MA), 2004 Democratic presidential nominee, and 68th U.S. Secretary of State
- Shamus Khan 1996, sociologist and author
- Alan Khazei, founder of City Year
- Frederick Joseph Kinsman, ecclesiastical historian
- Sol Kumin, businessman and racehorse owner
- Benjamin Kunkel, novelist and political economist

== L ==
- Beirne Lay, Jr. 1927, author, Twelve O'Clock High
- Howard Lederer, tournament poker champion, winner of two World Series of Poker titles, and two World Poker Tour titles
- Janice Y.K. Lee 1990, New York Times bestselling author of The Piano Teacher
- John Lindsay 1940, U.S. congressman, former mayor of New York City

== M ==
- Michel McQueen Martin 1976, journalist for ABC and NPR
- Cord Meyer, CIA official
- Rick Moody 1979, novelist, author of The Ice Storm
- Paul Moore, Jr. 1937, 13th Episcopal bishop of New York
- William Moore 1933, president and chairman of the board, Bankers Trust
- J. P. Morgan, Jr. 1884, banker and philanthropist
- Junius Spencer Morgan II 1884, banker and art collector
- Samuel Eliot Morison, author, Pulitzer Prize winner, Harvard University professor
- Robert Mueller 1962, director of the FBI 2001–13, special counsel in 2017 U.S. election investigation

== N ==
- Philip Neal 1986, principal dancer for the New York City Ballet
- Francis Augustus Nelson, architect
- Judd Nelson 1978, actor, The Breakfast Club, Making the Grade
- William Warder Norton, publisher and co-founder of W. W. Norton & Company

== O ==
- Catherine Oxenberg 1979, actress

== P ==
- Peter Pennoyer, 1975, architect, great-grandson of J. P. Morgan Jr.
- Paul Pennoyer Jr., 1938, lawyer and naval hero, grandson of J. P. Morgan Jr.
- Robert Morgan Pennoyer, 1943, lawyer and author, grandson of J. P. Morgan Jr.
- Maxwell Perkins 1903, noted editor at Charles Scribner's Sons, editor of F. Scott Fitzgerald
- Harry Boone Porter, Episcopal clergyman, author, editor of The Living Church magazine
- Robert Post 1928, prominent journalist and member of the Writing 69th
- Lewis Thompson Preston 1944, president of the World Bank

== R ==
- Jonathan Reckford 1980, CEO of Habitat for Humanity
- Whitelaw Reid, Jr., 1931, chairman of the New York Herald Tribune and The Fresh Air Fund
- Marcus T. Reynolds, 1886, prominent architect in Albany, New York
- S. Dillon Ripley, 1932, 8th Director of the Smithsonian Institution (1964 to 1984) and recipient of the Presidential Medal of Freedom
- Edmund Maurice Burke Roche, 4th Baron Fermoy 1905, Conservative MP, British Peer

== S ==
- Charles P. de Saint-Aignan 1995, software engineer and astronomer; namesake of planet 5995 Saint-Aignan
- Hermann von Wechlinger Schulte, anatomist and dean of Creighton University School of Medicine
- Charles Scribner III 1909, president of Charles Scribner's Sons
- George B. Shattuck, editor of the Boston Medical and Surgical Journal (later renamed The New England Journal of Medicine)
- Roger Shattuck, Proust scholar
- Alex Shoumatoff, literary journalist and environmentalist
- Lockhart Steele, 1992, blogger and journalist; founder of Curbed and former editorial director of Vox Media
- Anson Phelps Stokes II, 1896, philanthropist and secretary of Yale University
- Anson Phelps Stokes III 1922, Episcopal bishop of Massachusetts
- Edward L. Stokes, congressman (R) from Pennsylvania
- Nicholas Stoller, writer and director of Forgetting Sarah Marshall, Yes Man, and Get Him to the Greek
- Thomas Winthrop Streeter Sr., 1900, Americana collector
- Don Sweeney 1984, general manager of the Boston Bruins; former NHL player

== T ==
- William Howard Taft IV 1962, U.S. deputy secretary of defense, NATO ambassador
- Van Taylor, U.S. representative from Texas
- William Davis Taylor 1950, publisher of The Boston Globe
- Charles W. Thayer, diplomat
- George Thayer, political writer
- Augusta Read Thomas, composer of orchestral music; chair of the board of the American Music Center
- Sir Henry Worth Thornton, president, Canadian National Railway; Vanderbilt University football coach 1894; knighted by George V
- C. Whitney Tillinghast 2nd, Adjutant General of New York
- Garry Trudeau 1966, Pulitzer Prize-winning Doonesbury cartoonist

== V ==
- Alfred Gwynne Vanderbilt Jr., member of the Vanderbilt family; became a notable Thoroughbred racehorse/race track owner
- Alfred Gwynne Vanderbilt Sr., wealthy businessman; died on the RMS Lusitania
- Cornelius Vanderbilt III
- James Vanderbilt 1994, Hollywood screenwriter

== W ==
- David Walton 1997, television and film actor
- Owen West, U.S. military officer and writer
- Charles H. Whipple, US Army brigadier general
- Sheldon Whitehouse 1973, U.S. senator (D-RI)
- Theodore Stark Wilkinson 1905, vice-admiral of the United States Navy during World War II
- Caroline Randall Williams 2006, poet/author, co-author of Soul Food Love
- John Gilbert Winant 1909, twice governor of New Hampshire, U.S. ambassador to the United Kingdom during World War II
- Owen Wister, writer
- Andrew Wylie, literary agent

== Z ==
- Alan "Scooter" Zackheim 2001, winner of the third season of Beauty and the Geek
- Efrem Zimbalist, Jr. 1936, film and television actor
