= Coit =

Coit may refer to:

== People ==
- Adela Coit (1863–1932), German women's suffragist
- Alfred Coit (1835–1879), American lawyer and politician
- Coit Albertson, American actor
- Coit D. Blacker, Special Assistant to the President
- Daniel Coit Gilman, American educator
- James Milnor Coit, American teacher
- John Coit Spooner, senator from Wisconsin
- Joshua Coit: American lawyer and politician
- Judson B. Coit Observatory, the astronomical observatory of the Boston University
- Lillie Hitchcock Coit, firefighter and eccentric
- Madelin Coit, American multi-media artist
- Moses Coit Tyler, American author
- Stanton Coit, writer on ethics

== Other ==
- Coit Tower, landmark in San Francisco
- Battle of Cat Coit Celidon, a battle in Arthurian legends
- English profanity

== See also ==
- Koit (disambiguation)
- Quoit (disambiguation)
