= Malcolm Gordon =

Malcolm Gordon may refer to:

- Malcolm Gordon (fighter) (born 1990), Canadian mixed martial artist
- Malcolm Gordon (ice hockey) (1868–1964), American ice hockey coach
  - Malcolm Gordon School (former), Garrison, New York, founded by the hockey player
