= Koit =

Koit (Estonian for dawn) or KOIT may refer to:

- KOIT, a radio station (96.5 FM) licensed to San Francisco, California, US
- Koit (name), an Estonian masculine given name
- "Koit" (song), by Tõnis Mägi
- Koit (star) or XO-4, a star in the constellation Lynx
- Koit, a character, for which the star is named, from a folk tale by Friedrich Robert Faehlmann
- Koit (newspaper), former newspaper of Põlva County

== See also ==
- Coit (disambiguation)
- Koito (disambiguation)
- Quoit (disambiguation)
