= Quoit =

Quoit may refer to:

- Quoit, a single-chambered megalithic tomb, also called a Dolmen
- Quoit (brooch), a pre-medieval type of brooch
- A ring used in the game of quoits
- Chakram, a weapon sometimes called a war-quoit
- Quoit, Cornwall, a location in England
- Quoit Green, a location in Derbyshire, England

== See also ==
- Coit (disambiguation)
- Koit (disambiguation)
