= Koito (disambiguation) =

Koito is a Kalenjin wedding ritual.

Koito may also refer to:

- Koito Manufacturing, Japanese industrial company
- Koito River, Chiba Prefecture, Japan
- Yuu Koito, a character from the Yuri series Bloom Into You

== See also ==
- Koit (disambiguation)
