= Francis Parkman Coffin =

American electrical engineer

- Born: Francis Parkman Coffin; April 5, 1880; Brookline, Massachusetts, U.S.
- Died: August 19, 1956 (aged 76); Schenectady, New York, U.S.
- Education: St. Paul's; Harvard
- Occupation: Electrical Engineer
- Spouse: Miriam Gage (m. 1920)
- Children: Francis Parkman Coffin Jr. (b. 1921); Rosamond (Coffin) Hopkins (1926–1963); Lucy (Coffin) Jamison (b. 1923)
- Parent(s): Charles Pratt Coffin (1854–1927); Grace Parkman (1851–1928)
- Relatives: Francis Parkman; Charles Coffin

Francis Parkman Coffin (April 5, 1880 – August 19, 1956) was an American electrical engineering pioneer. He was a leader in research and development for the General Electric Corporation.

== Early life and education ==
Coffin was born in Brookline, Massachusetts, to Charles Pratt Coffin and Grace Parkman, daughter of historian Francis Parkman. His father was first cousin of General Electric co-founder Charles Coffin. He was educated at the St. Paul's School in Concord, New Hampshire, and graduated from Harvard College in 1902.

== Career ==
Coffin joined General Electric shortly after graduation. He worked at GE for the duration of his career, first in the testing department and then in the Research Laboratory. For several years, he worked on the pioneer development of the iron mercury arc rectifier. Later, he worked on methods of generating power from coal more efficiently, and co-authored a book on the subject, Pulverized coal systems in America. He also conducted experimental studies of the properties and limitations of various types of steel for use in mercury boilers and steam turbines at high pressures and temperatures.

Coffin was an active conservationist, and became an authority on the studies of botany, geology, and anthropology. He was a member of the American Institute of Electrical Engineers. He died on August 19, 1956, in Schenectady, New York, at age 76.

== See also ==
- General Electric
- Electrical engineering
