= Will Ahmed =

American entrepreneur

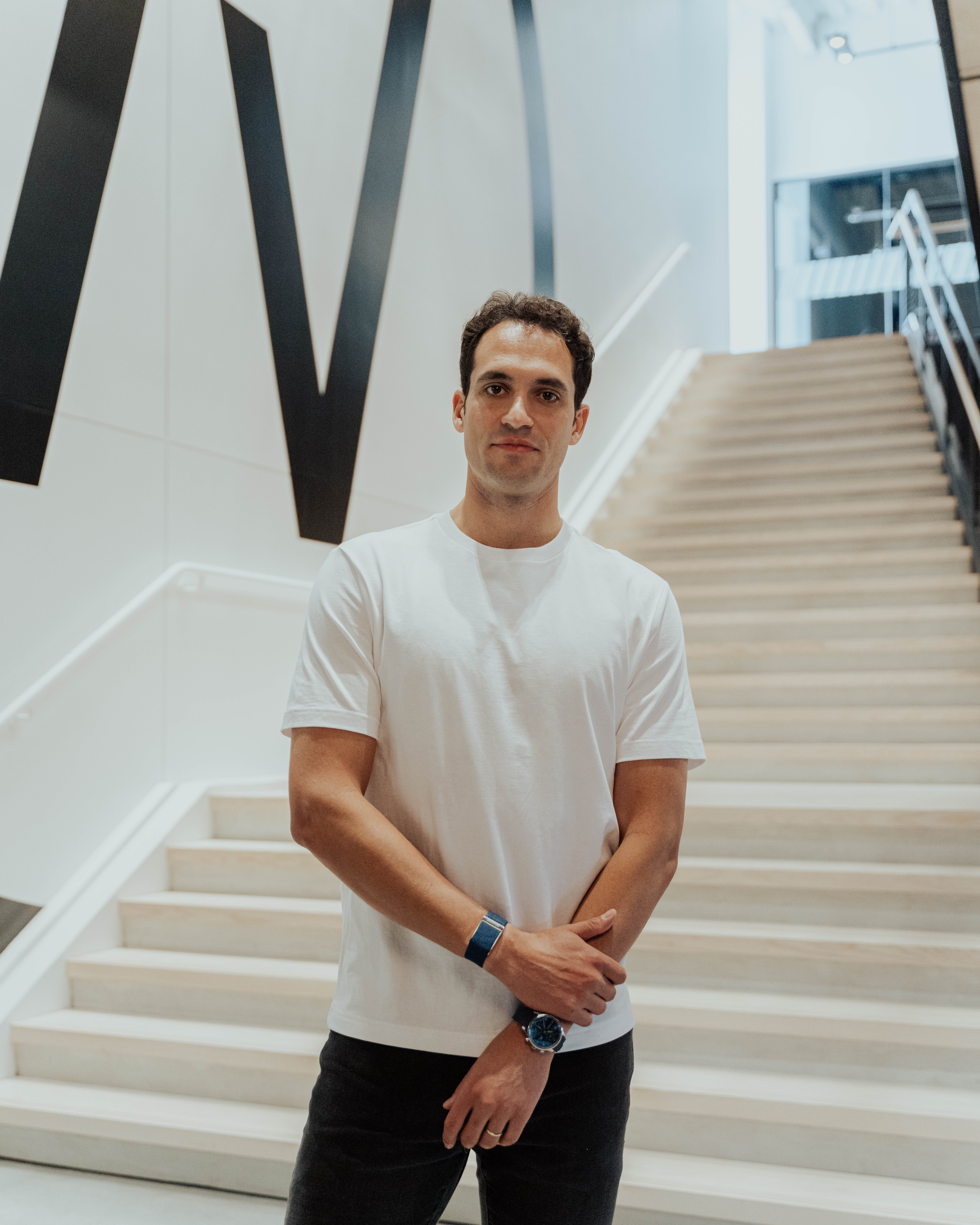
- Born: Long Island, New York, U.S.
- Education: Harvard University (BA)
- Occupation: Entrepreneur
- Title: Founder & CEO of WHOOP
- Spouse: Leily Amirsardary (m. 2018)
- Website: whoop.com

William Ahmed is an Egyptian-American entrepreneur best known as the CEO of health wearables company WHOOP, which he founded in 2012.

== Early life ==
Ahmed grew up in Long Island, New York. He is an only child. As a child, he played multiple sports including soccer, hockey, lacrosse, tennis, swimming, golf, and sailing. He attended high school at St. Paul's School in Concord, NH. He went on to graduate from Harvard College, where he studied government and was the captain of the Harvard Crimson men's squash team .

== Career ==
In 2012, while a student at Harvard, Ahmed began developing new wearable technology that would allow athletes to measure recovery and optimize performance. According to Ahmed, he began creating the technology after reading dozens of medical papers. The company's first wearable device launched in 2015. Ahmed pursued a strategy of selling the product to top sports teams and athletes before marketing to the broader consumer base in order to generate a "halo effect" for the brand. Olympic swimmer Michael Phelps and NBA star Lebron James were among the first users of the device.

In 2021, the company was valued at $3.6 billion following SoftBank's investment of $200 million in the company. Under Ahmed's leadership, WHOOP has recruited investors including IVP, Eli Manning, Patrick Mahomes, and Larry Fitzgerald.

In 2022, Ahmed publicly claimed victory over Amazon in the wearable competition after Amazon discontinued its Halo wearable product. He alleged that Amazon's Halo band was a knockoff of the WHOOP device. Amazon publicly denied the allegations.

WHOOP moved into its new headquarters in Kenmore Square neighborhood of Boston, Massachusetts in July 2023. Ahmed was joined by Boston Mayor Michelle Wu and U.S. Labor Secretary Marty Walsh for the ribbon cutting.

In 2023, Ahmed was appointed to the Harvard Medical School Board of Fellows.

In May 2024, Ahmed announced that Portuguese footballer Cristiano Ronaldo had invested in WHOOP. Ahmed and Ronaldo made the announcement in an Instagram Live video at Ronaldo's home in Riyadh, Saudi Arabia. The same month, Ahmed also announced that WHOOP would be available for sale in India, following reports that cricketers Virat Kohli, Suryakumar Yadav and Shreyas Iyer all wore WHOOP during the ICC Cricket World Cup.

In 2026, Ahmed was recognized as one of Time Magazine's 100 Most Influential People in Sports.

== Personal life ==
Ahmed is married to Leily Amirsardary, an Iranian fashion designer. They married in 2018 during a three-day wedding in Cannes.

Ahmed is an avid golfer. He has previously played in the Waste Management Phoenix Open Pro-Am. Ahmed practices daily Transcendental Meditation, and also tries to exercise five days a week at a minimum.

Ahmed's father is Egyptian. He immigrated to the United States and worked in the financial services industry.
