= Judson B. Coit =

American astronomer and mathematician

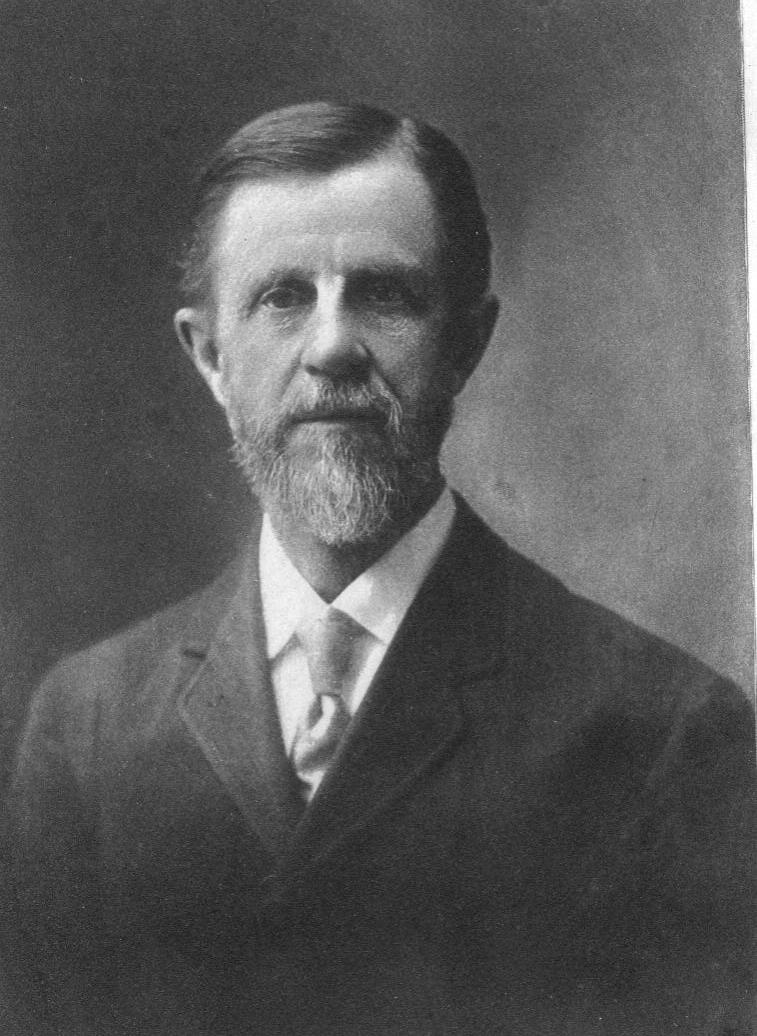
- Judson B. Coit in 1910
- Born: 1849
- Died: 1921 (aged 71–72)
- Occupations: astronomer, mathematician

Judson Boardman Coit (1849–1921) was an American mathematician and astronomer. The largest part of his professional career was spent as a professor at Boston University, where he established the department of astronomy and developed a teaching and research observatory. The teaching observatory at Boston University is named in his memory.

Judson Coit was raised on a central New York farm and attended a rural district school. His education included sufficient mathematics to enter college, as well as one term of Latin. At age 17, he was working on a farm during the summer, attending Falley Seminary in Fulton, New York, during fall and spring, and teaching school during the winter.

In 1871, at age 22, he entered Syracuse University during its first full year of operation. His undergraduate studies included particular attention to Greek, which he intended to teach, and to mathematics, because he liked the subject and admired the men who taught it. He became a member of the Delta Kappa Epsilon fraternity, the Glee Club, and played varsity baseball.

After graduation with a BA degree, Judson Coit served as professor of mathematics at Dickenson Seminary in Williamsport, Pennsylvania, for four years (1875–1879) and obtained a master's degree from Syracuse University in 1878.

He worked with John Martin Schaeberle as student assistant in the Detroit Observatory in Ann Arbor, Michigan (1879–1880), then taught advanced mathematics and astronomy at the Central High School in Cleveland, Ohio. While in Cleveland, he was in charge of fitting out a private observatory for L. E. Holden and continued his astronomical work, receiving a PhD from Syracuse University in 1881. His thesis topic was "The Orbit of Eta Cassiopeia". The substance of this work was later published in the monthly notices of the Royal Astronomical Society of London.

Coit was appointed an Assistant Professor of Mathematics in the Boston University College of Liberal Arts in 1882, and a full professor of mathematics in 1884. In his first year at BU, he taught analytics, astronomy, calculus, mechanics, and quaternions. The college initially had no astronomical equipment, so he took his astronomy students to the Boston Common, where a public pay telescope was available, and paid the fees from his own resources.

In 1885 he became secretary of the faculty of the college, and retained that post for 30 years, in addition to his teaching and research activities. He served as acting dean of the graduate school of Boston University in 1911–12. His academic title was changed to professor of astronomy in 1915.
