= Shamus Khan =

American sociologist

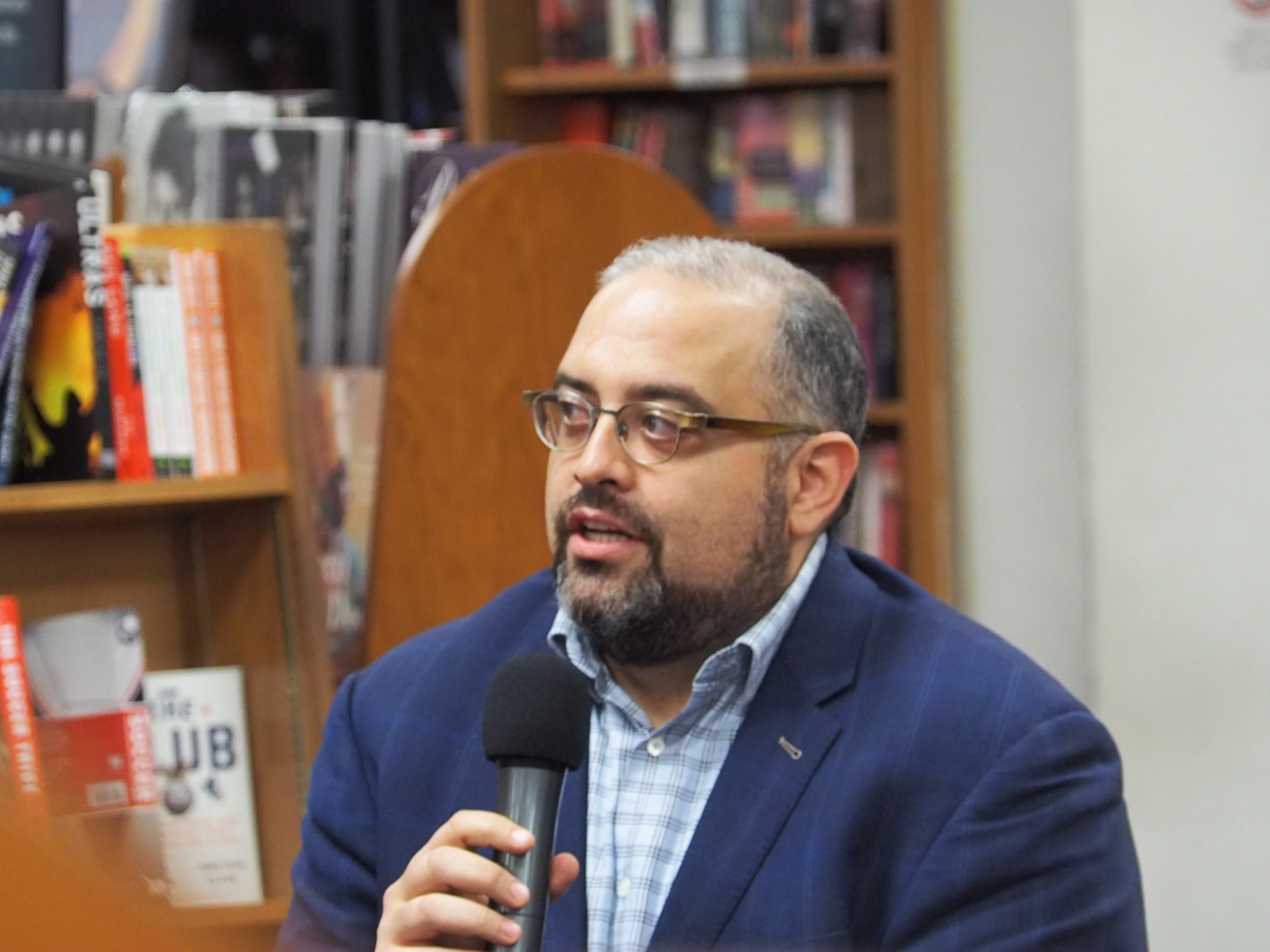
- Khan speaks at Politics & Prose in Washington, D.C., in January 2020
- Born: Shamus Rahman Khan; October 8, 1978 (age 48); New York City, United States
- Occupations: Sociologist, professor

Shamus Rahman Khan (born October 8, 1978) is an American sociologist. He has been a professor of Sociology and American studies at Princeton University since 2021. Formerly he served as chair of the sociology department at Columbia University. He writes on elites, inequality, gender/sexuality, and American culture. His work has appeared in numerous national and international media outlets.

== Early life ==
Khan was born in New York to M. Akmal Khan, a surgeon, and Maura Khan, a nurse, both immigrants from Pakistan and Ireland, respectively. He has an older brother, Omar Khan, who has a PhD in political science from Oxford and was the director of the Runnymede Trust until 2020 and is currently the director of the Centre for Transforming Access and Student Outcomes in Higher Education (TASO).

Khan attended St. Paul's School in Concord, New Hampshire, graduating magna cum laude with distinction in math, science, music, and Latin in 1996. He won the Howe Music Prize and the Rector's Award upon graduation. He graduated in 2000 from Haverford College, and received his MS in 2006 and his PhD in 2008 from the University of Wisconsin–Madison. He studied with Robert M. Hauser, Erik Olin Wright, and Myra Marx Ferree. His advisor was Mustafa Emirbayer. In 2007 he began teaching at Columbia University.

== Career ==
He has lectured and held visiting professor positions around the world. In 2014 he served as Directeur d’études invité at the École des hautes études en sciences sociales, and the Hallsworth Visiting professor at the University of Manchester. In 2010-11 he was a fellow at the Dorothy and Lewis B. Cullman Center for Scholars and Writers in the New York Public Library. He is the director of the Russell Sage Foundation research network which studies the political influence of economic elites, and is leading a research program that uses the archives of the New York Philharmonic to understand the long-term historical composition of classical music concert-goers. He is currently the editor of Public Culture.

=== Contributions ===
Khan has made contributions to the areas of inequality, cultural sociology, research methodology, and most of all to the sociology of elites. His book, Privilege: The Making of an Adolescent Elite at St. Paul's School, was published in 2011 by Princeton University Press. It won the C. Wright Mills Book Award in 2011. It was widely reviewed in both conservative and liberal circles.

In addition to his academic work, Khan has written extensively for the popular press. He served as a columnist for Time magazine, and has written op-eds and articles for The New York Times, The New Yorker, Al Jazeera America, Public Books, and Good Magazine.

== Publications ==
- Shamus Khan and Dana Fisher (2013), The Practice of Research. New York: Oxford University Press.
- Shamus Rahman Khan (2012), Privilege: The Making of an Adolescent Elite at St. Paul's School. Princeton, NJ: Princeton University Press.
