= Alfred Coit =

American politician (1835–1879)

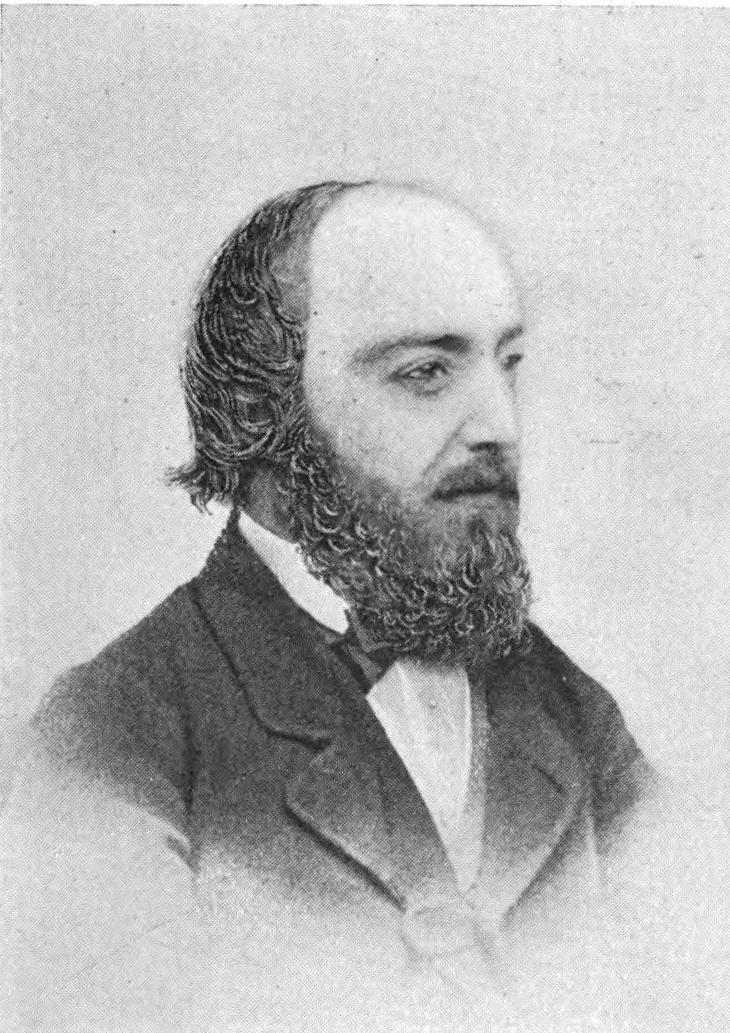
- Born: 23 May 1835
- Died: 17 January 1879
- Education: Harvard Law School, Yale University
- Occupations: Lawyer, politician

Alfred Coit (May 23, 1835 – January 17, 1879) was an American lawyer, judge, and politician.

== Early life and education ==
Coit, son of Robert and Charlotte (Coit) Coit, was born in New London, Connecticut. His uncle was lawyer and politician Joshua Coit. He graduated from Yale College in 1856. After beginning the study of law with his brother, Robert Coit Jr., in New London, he continued his studies in the Law School of Harvard University, receiving the degree of LL.B. in 1858.

== Career ==
In November 1858 he was admitted to the New London County Bar, and practiced his profession with success and public esteem in his native city until his death in that place. He was a Republican member of the Connecticut House of Representatives in 1862, 1863, and 1864, and of the Connecticut Senate in 1868. From 1865 to 1868 he was a member of the Connecticut State Board of Education, and Judge of Probate for the New London District in 1875–76. At the session of the State Legislature in January 1877, he was elected Judge of the Court of Common Pleas for New London County for four years from July 1, 1877, and was in the discharge of the duties of this office at the close of his life.

== Personal life and legacy ==
Coit was married, August 1, 1862, to Ellen Hobron of New London. His wife with five children survived him when he died in 1879, at the age of 43. His son and namesake Alfred Coit became a judge and banker prominent in New London.
