= Lacy Crawford =

American author and journalist (b. 1975)

- Education: Princeton University
- Children: 3

Lacy Crawford (born 1975) is an American author, journalist, novelist, and memoirist. She has published a novel, Early Decision, and a memoir, Notes on a Silencing.

== Career ==
Crawford's career has included working as a rape crisis counselor, a high school teacher, a private admissions counselor, and an environmental campaigner. However, her long-held dream was to be a writer. Her first book, Early Decision, was published in 2013. It is a satirical novel about the college admissions process, based on her time working as a private admissions counselor. Her second book, Notes on a Silencing, was published in 2020 to critical acclaim.

== Notes on a Silencing ==
Crawford attended St. Paul's School where she was allegedly raped by two senior boys in 1990 at the age of 15. She reported the incident to the school and underwent a medical examination that revealed she may have been infected with herpes, but the school covered it up. The story of her assault and the school's subsequent actions is the basis of her memoir Notes on a Silencing.

After graduating from St. Paul's in 1992, Crawford attended college at Princeton University. It was there, in 1994, that Crawford's seminar instructor Toni Morrison encouraged her to write the assault into a book. She declined that idea at the time, writing a master's thesis on the use of rape testimony in legal cases instead.

It wasn't until 2017, when Crawford participated in the New Hampshire state investigation into St. Paul's School, that she discovered the existence of documentary evidence of the school's cover up of her assault. She would later say that "I got lucky. Detectives happened across documents that were in my student file that really outlined how the school had planned to silence me." However, the documents were not included in the state's investigation into the school.

This discovery inspired Crawford to begin writing her memoir of the experience in 2017, concluding with a first draft by 2018. The entire writing process for the book took 14 weeks. Decades after her assault, Crawford published that memoir, titled Notes on a Silencing, in 2020.

A few weeks after its publication, St. Paul's issued a formal apology to Crawford. Crawford was impressed by the "thoughtful" apology, which she shared on her social media. She said, "There are a lot of institutions that can learn from this."

Crawford's memoir received critical acclaim. It was named a New York Times Editors’ Choice and Notable Book, as well as a Best Book of 2020 by Time, People, NPR, BookPage, Library Journal, and LitHub.

== Personal life ==
Crawford was raised in Lake Forest, Illinois by her mother, an Episcopal priest, and her father, an executive. Her mother, Reverend Alicia Crawford, became one of the first women to be ordained a priest in the Episcopal diocese of Chicago in 1987.

Crawford lives in Rancho Santa Fe, California with her husband and 3 children.

== Published works ==
- (2013) Early Decision: Based on a True Frenzy. William Morrow. ISBN 978-0-06-224061-3
- (2020) Notes on a Silencing. New York: Little, Brown and Company. ISBN 780316491556
