= Whoop (company) =

Wearable technology company

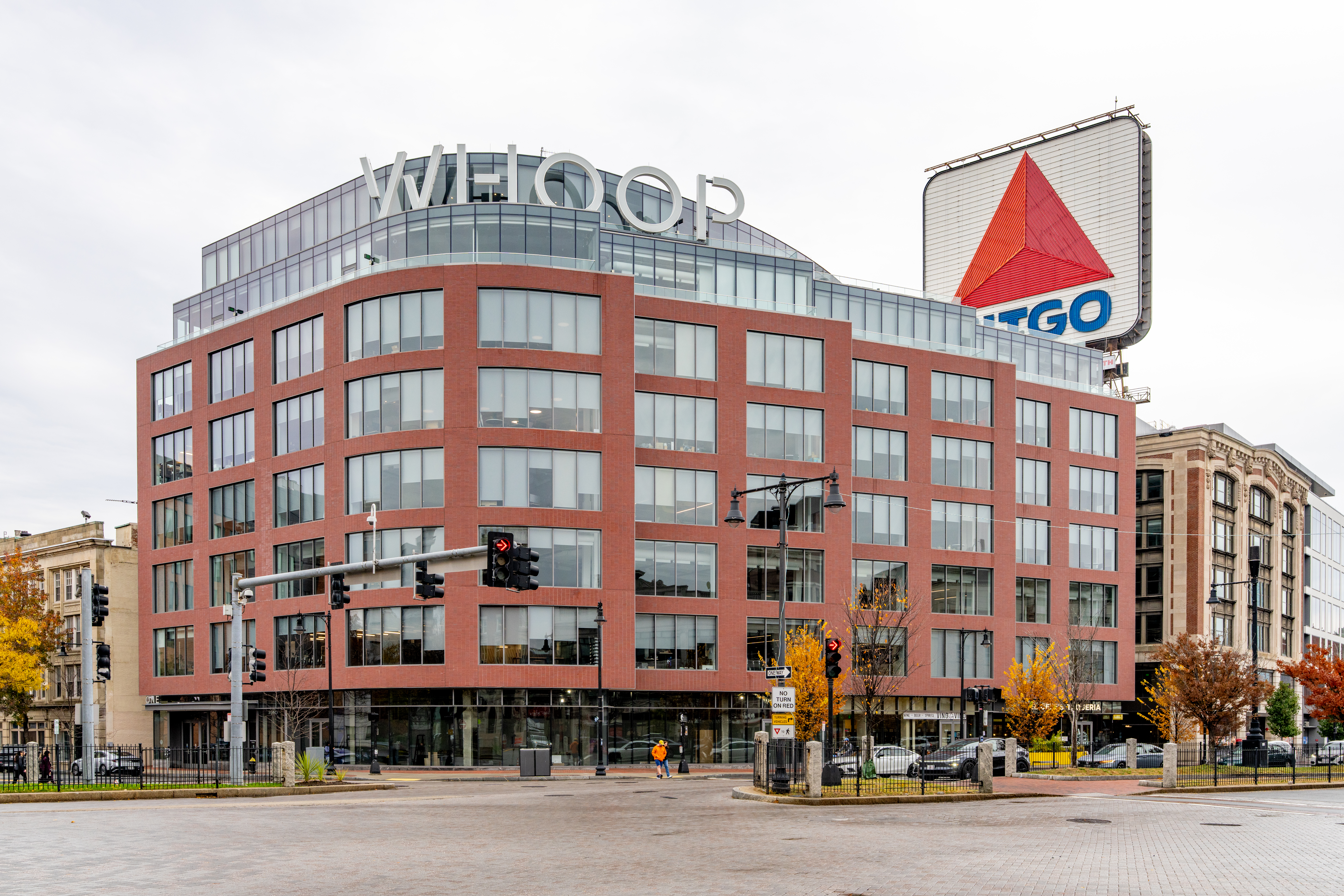
- Headquarters in Boston
- Type: Private
- Industry: Wearable technology
- Founded: 2012; 14 years ago
- Founder: Will Ahmed
- Headquarters: Boston, Massachusetts, US
- Key people: Will Ahmed (CEO); John Sullivan (CMO); Mich Chandlee (CFO); Garrett Bastable (COO)
- Number of employees: 800 (2026)
- Website: whoop.com

Whoop, Inc. (stylized as WHOOP) is an American wearable technology company headquartered in Boston, Massachusetts. Its principal product is a health tracker that measures strain, recovery, and sleep. The device is best known for its use by athletes and is often used to track overall health and detect illness.

The Whoop band is promoted by athletes including Cristiano Ronaldo, Virat Kohli, Rory McIlroy, Aryna Sabalenka, LeBron James, Michael Phelps, Sir Lewis Hamilton and Charles Leclerc.

== Product ==
Whoop 1.0 was released in 2015, followed by versions in 2016 and 2019. Whoop 4.0 debuted in 2021 with improved battery technology that increased capacity.

The device collects data on sleep, heart rate variability (HRV), resting heart rate, and respiratory rate to create a daily recovery score ranging from 0% to 100%, helping users determine if their body is ready for exertion or needs rest. It also provides suggested exertion goals based on recovery and sleep data.

On March 29, 2023, Whoop announced its Stress Monitor feature, tracking daily stress levels via HRV and resting heart rate, with breathwork interventions developed with Andrew Huberman. In September 2023, Whoop released “Whoop Coach,” powered by OpenAI, offering conversational health and fitness coaching.

In 2025, Whoop shared that the FDA comments on its blood pressure feature, arguing the agency was “overstepping its authority.” In May 2025, Whoop adjusted its upgrade terms for the 5.0 and MG, eventually providing complimentary upgrades for members with 12+ months remaining and refunds for those charged in error.

In September 2025, Whoop launched “Advanced Labs,” integrating clinical blood test data with wearable health metrics and expanding availability internationally.

Whoop differs from other wearables by having no screen or buttons; all data is accessed through the Whoop app on Android and iOS. It requires a monthly subscription, and without one, the device stops tracking. According to Time, Whoop collects significantly more data than competitors, with five sensors gathering 100 MB of data per user per day.

== History ==
Whoop was founded in 2012 by Harvard student-athlete Will Ahmed, together with John Capodilupo and Aurelian Nicolae. The company was incubated at the Harvard Innovation Labs. The name “Whoop” originated as a motivational phrase Ahmed used before games.

In August 2021, Whoop raised $200 million from SoftBank at a valuation of $3.6 billion. Additional investors include IVP, the NFL Players Association, and athletes including Kevin Durant, Patrick Mahomes, Rory McIlroy, Eli Manning, and Larry Fitzgerald.

As of 2022, Ahmed is CEO, Nicolae is director of mechanical engineering, and Capodilupo was CTO until April 2022.

In April 2026, Whoop raised $575 million in Series G financing, creating a valuation of $10.1 billion. Some of the investors included Abbott and Mayo Clinic.

=== Controversy ===
In May 2025, WHOOP faced public backlash following the launch of its WHOOP 5.0 and WHOOP MG (Medical Grade) devices. The controversy centered on changes to the upgrade policy for existing subscribers, which contradicted earlier promises of free hardware upgrades as part of WHOOP's subscription model. Many users were surprised to learn they would either need to pay an upgrade fee of $49 for WHOOP 5.0—or $79 for WHOOP MG—or extend their subscriptions by an additional 12 months to obtain the new devices. Prior blog posts and FAQs had previously stated that upgrades would be free after six months of membership, sparking accusations of deceptive practices when screenshots of deleted statements began circulating online.

In response to mounting criticism, WHOOP reversed course on 10 May 2025. The company updated its policy to grant free WHOOP 5.0 upgrades to members with 12 or more months remaining on their subscriptions and promised refunds for those mistakenly charged upgrade fees. WHOOP clarified that the original policy miscommunication was due to a blog post error, explaining that free upgrades were always tied to longer membership terms. Support for the previous-generation WHOOP 4.0 devices continued, though new features—like ECG and blood pressure monitoring—remained exclusive to the premium MG model.

== Sports ==
Whoop is approved by multiple professional sports organizations including CrossFit, the Ladies Professional Golf Association, Major League Baseball, the National Football League Players Association, the Women's Tennis Association and the PGA Tour.

The device is used by athletes such as Virat Kohli, Michael Phelps, LeBron James,, Rory McIlroy, Nelly Korda, Tiger Woods, and Justin Thomas.

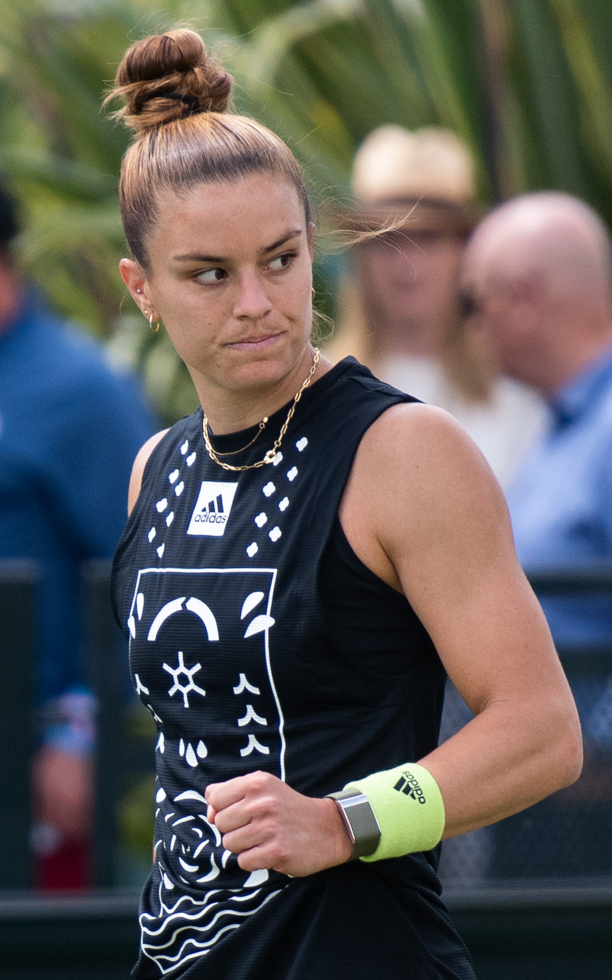
Tennis player Maria Sakkari wearing the Whoop band in 2022

In 2017, several NBA players were reported to have worn Whoop devices during games despite league restrictions.

In 2023, cricketer Virat Kohli prominently wore Whoop during the ICC Men’s Cricket World Cup, influencing widespread adoption across cricket. In May 2024, Cristiano Ronaldo became both an investor and ambassador for Whoop.

In January 2026, Whoop became the official health and fitness wearable partner of the Ferrari Formula One team. The partnership provides Whoop wearable devices to drivers, pit crew, engineers, and team personnel to monitor physiological metrics, including sleep, recovery, stress, and heart rate variability. Ferrari’s medical team works with Whoop’s Performance Science experts to integrate biometric data into training, recovery strategies, and workload management. Whoop branding appears on Ferrari team apparel and the SF‑26 race car.

During the 2026 Australian Open, tournament officials requested that several professional tennis players remove their WHOOP devices during live matches.

Starting at the 2026 French Open, the tennis Grand Slam tournaments permitted the use of connected devices by players for the first time, such as the Whoop bands, allowing players access to a broader range of performance-related information during competition.

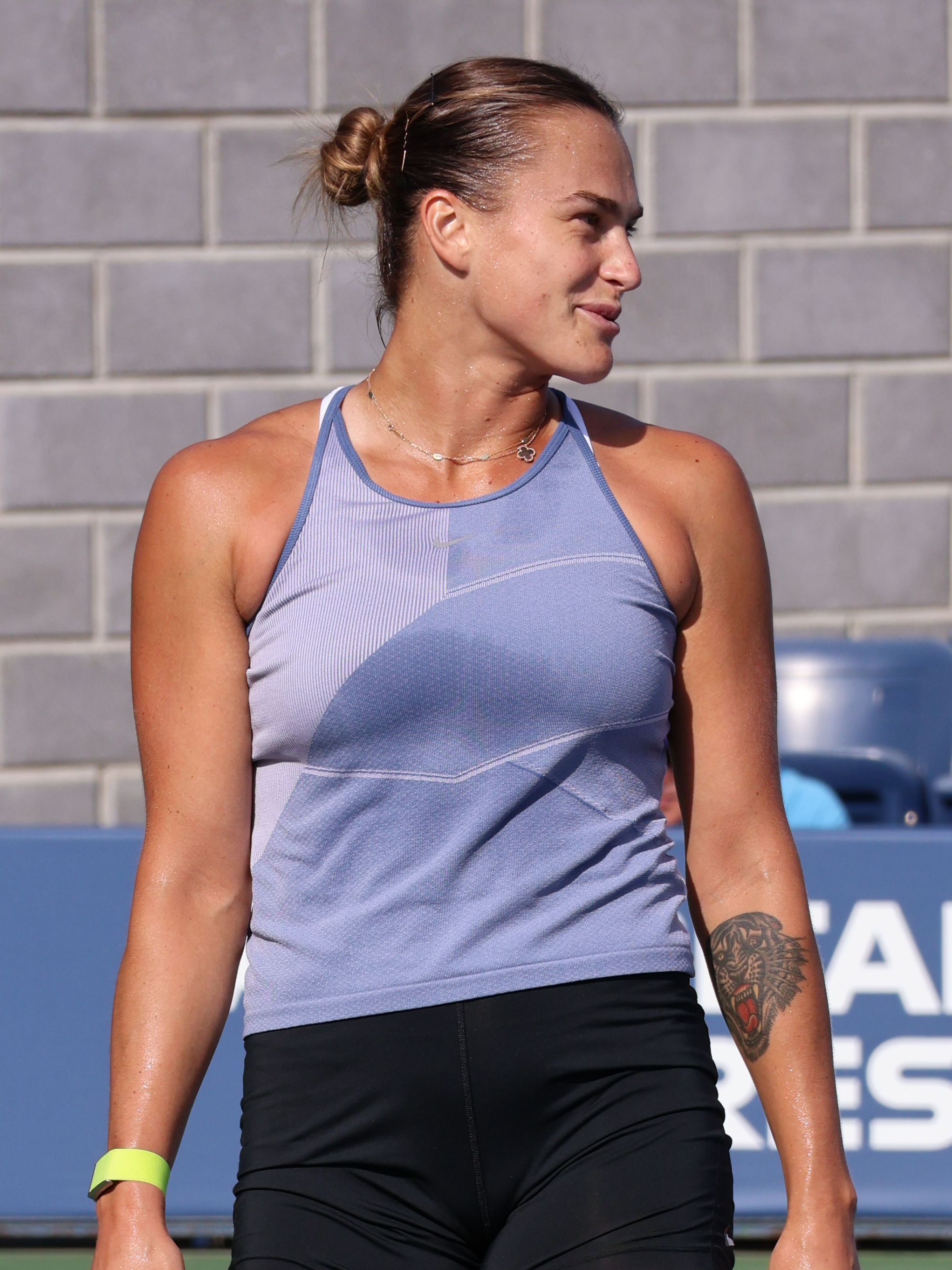
Tennis player Aryna Sabalenka wearing the Whoop band in the 2023 Us Open at practice

== In popular culture ==
WHOOP has also been worn by pop star Niall Horan. In 2025, he invested in the company.

In 2026, social media users incorrectly identified White House Chief of Staff Susie Wiles’s WHOOP strap as a prohibited Apple Watch during a secure briefing. The White House clarified that the National Security Agency (NSA) approves the device for use in Sensitive Compartmented Information Facilities (SCIFs) due to its "secure by design" architecture.

Sheikh Hamdan bin Mohammed Al Maktoum, the Crown Prince of Dubai, has publicly shared his WHOOP health data and recovery scores on his verified Instagram account to document his fitness regimen.

== COVID-19 ==
In 2020, Whoop played a key role in early COVID-19 detection. PGA Tour golfer Nick Watney noticed a respiratory rate spike on his Whoop and tested positive for the virus despite no symptoms, prompting a PGA Tour partnership to supply Whoop devices to players and caddies. Another golfer, Scott Stallings, also identified early signs of infection using Whoop.

Whoop later partnered with Central Queensland University researchers to validate its virus detection algorithm, which identified 80% of positive COVID-19 cases by day three of symptoms and 20% two days before onset.
