= James Milnor Coit =

American teacher and scientist (1845–1922)

James Milnor Coit (January 31, 1845 – January 5, 1922) was an American teacher and scientist.

He was born in Harrisburg, Pennsylvania, and educated at Hobart College. He was connected for some time with the Cleveland Tube Works. In 1876, he became master in natural sciences at his alma mater, St. Paul's School in Concord, New Hampshire, where he was appointed vice rector in 1904. In 1909, he was in Europe at the Ludwig-Maximilians-Universität München, engaged in research. He later became head of the Coit School for American boys in Munich.

In 1903, he was elected an honorary member of the New Hampshire Society of the Cincinnati.

== Works ==
His publications include:

- A Manual of Chemical Arithmetic (1886)
- Treatise on the X-Rays and their Relation to Medical and Surgical Sciences (1897)
- Liquid Air (1899)
