= Woodlawn (Garrison, New York) =

Historic house in New York, United States

- U.S. National Register of Historic Places
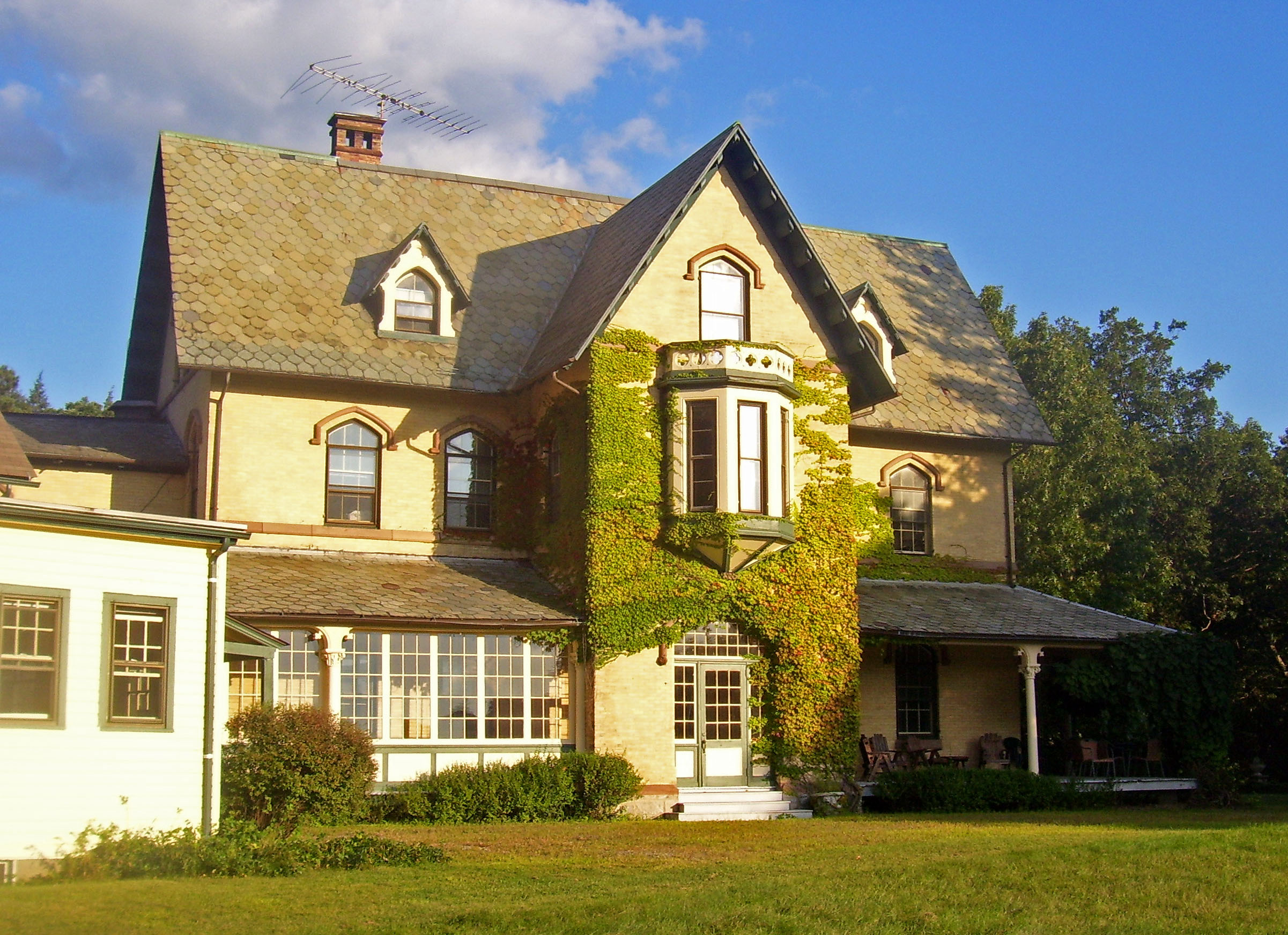
- West elevation of main block, 2008
- Location: Garrison, NY
- Coordinates: 41°23′32″N 73°56′10″W
- Area: 42 acres (17 ha)
- Built: 1854
- Architect: Richard Upjohn
- Architectural style: Gothic Revival
- MPS: Hudson Highlands MRA
- NRHP reference No.: 82001258
- Added to NRHP: November 23, 1982

Woodlawn is a former estate house overlooking the Hudson River in Garrison, New York, United States. It was designed in the mid-19th century by Richard Upjohn, who resided in the area for the last years of his life.

Later on it became the Malcolm Gordon School, and it is currently the headquarters of the Hastings Center, a prominent bioethics research institution. In 1982 it was listed on the National Register of Historic Places.

== Property ==
Woodlawn is a 42-acre (17 ha) property on the west side of NY 9D just south of St. Basil Academy, at one time the estate of New York Yankees owner Jacob Ruppert. It is a complex of several buildings, three of which are considered contributing resources to the Register listing.

The main house is a two-story brick structure on a stone foundation. There are frame single-story additions on the north and east. Its steeply-pitched cross-gabled roof, with exposed rafters at the eaves, is pierced by two dormer windows on either side and a brick chimney at the south end. On the west (front) facade is an oriel window with a balcony above. A porch with Corinthian columns wraps around the south and west sides of the house.

On the east the addition, originally built as a detached gym and now the center's Morison Library, is now connected to the house via a breezeway. The north extension projects from the porch and includes a garage, workshop, and apartment. A small stucco kitchen wing has been added to the north side of the house as well.

The three detached buildings are a combination stable and hayloft, carriage shed and ice house. The first, a one-story stucco structure, has since been converted into an apartment. The shed and ice house, frame and board-and-batten respectively, are now used for storage.

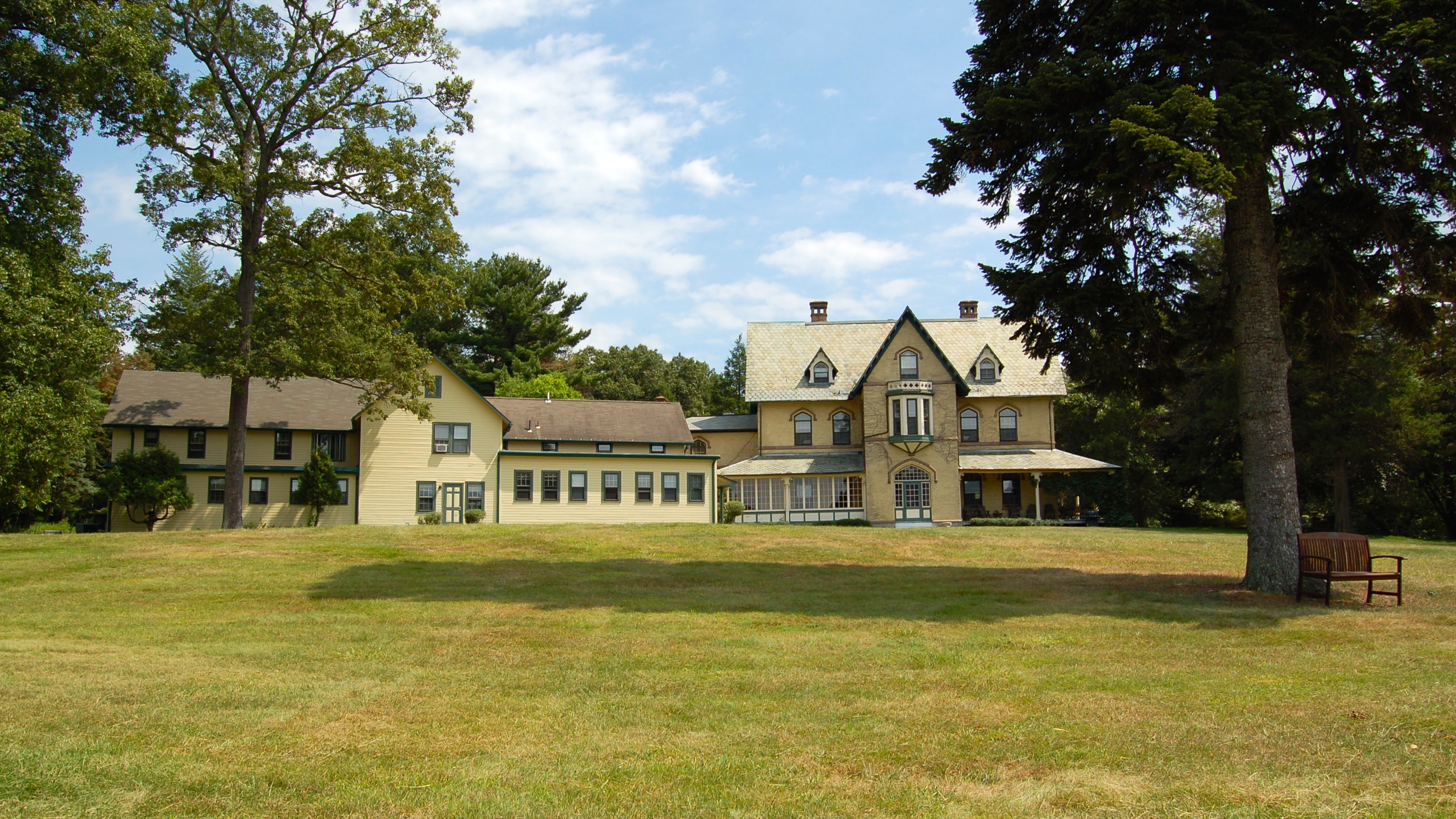
West elevations of main block and northern extension, 2014.

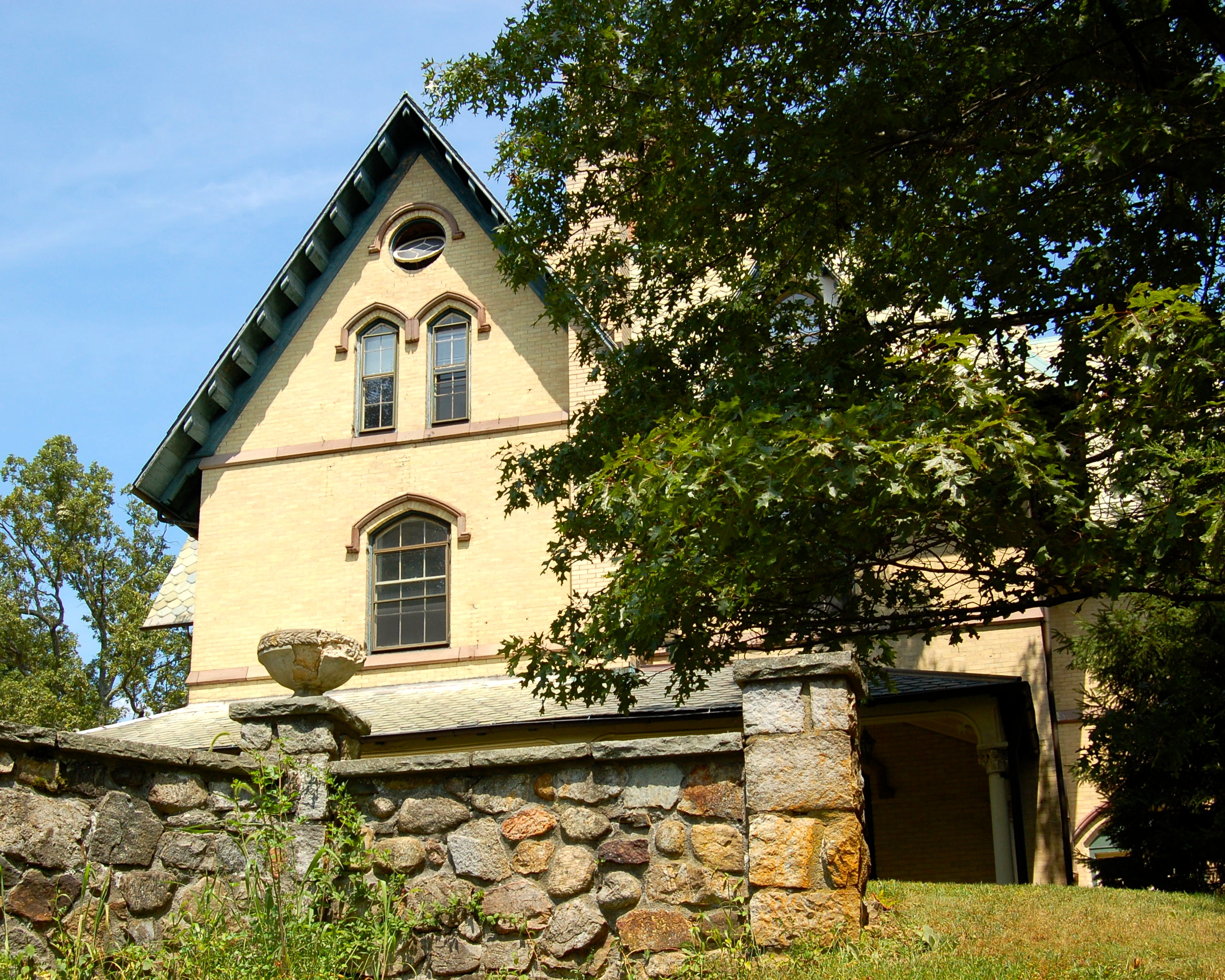
South elevation of main block, 2014.

== History ==
William Moore, a partner in a large New York City importing firm, commissioned Upjohn to design the house in 1854. He and his wife and their descendants used it as a summer residence until it was purchased by Malcolm Gordon in 1927 to start the boys' boarding school he named after himself.

Gordon made the changes to the property. The north wing was built in 1931 and expanded eight years later. Two decades later, in 1956, the gym was added. The kitchen wing was built in 1966, and three years later the garage on the north wing was added. The school remained active until the early 1980s.

The Hastings Center moved in a decade later. Some renovations were necessary.

== See also ==
- Hudson Highlands Multiple Resource Area
- National Register of Historic Places listings in Putnam County, New York
