= Koit (name) =

Male given name

- Gender: Male
- Language: Estonian
- Name day: 25 September

Origin
- Meaning: Dawn
- Region of origin: Estonia

Other names
- Related names: Koidu

Koit, an Estonian word meaning "dawn", is used as an Estonian masculine given name. Notable people with the name include:

- Koit Annamaa (1912–1970), Estonian track and field athlete
- Koit Pikaro (1949–2026), Estonian politician
- Koit Toome (born 1979), Estonian singer
