= Madelin Coit =

American multi-media artist

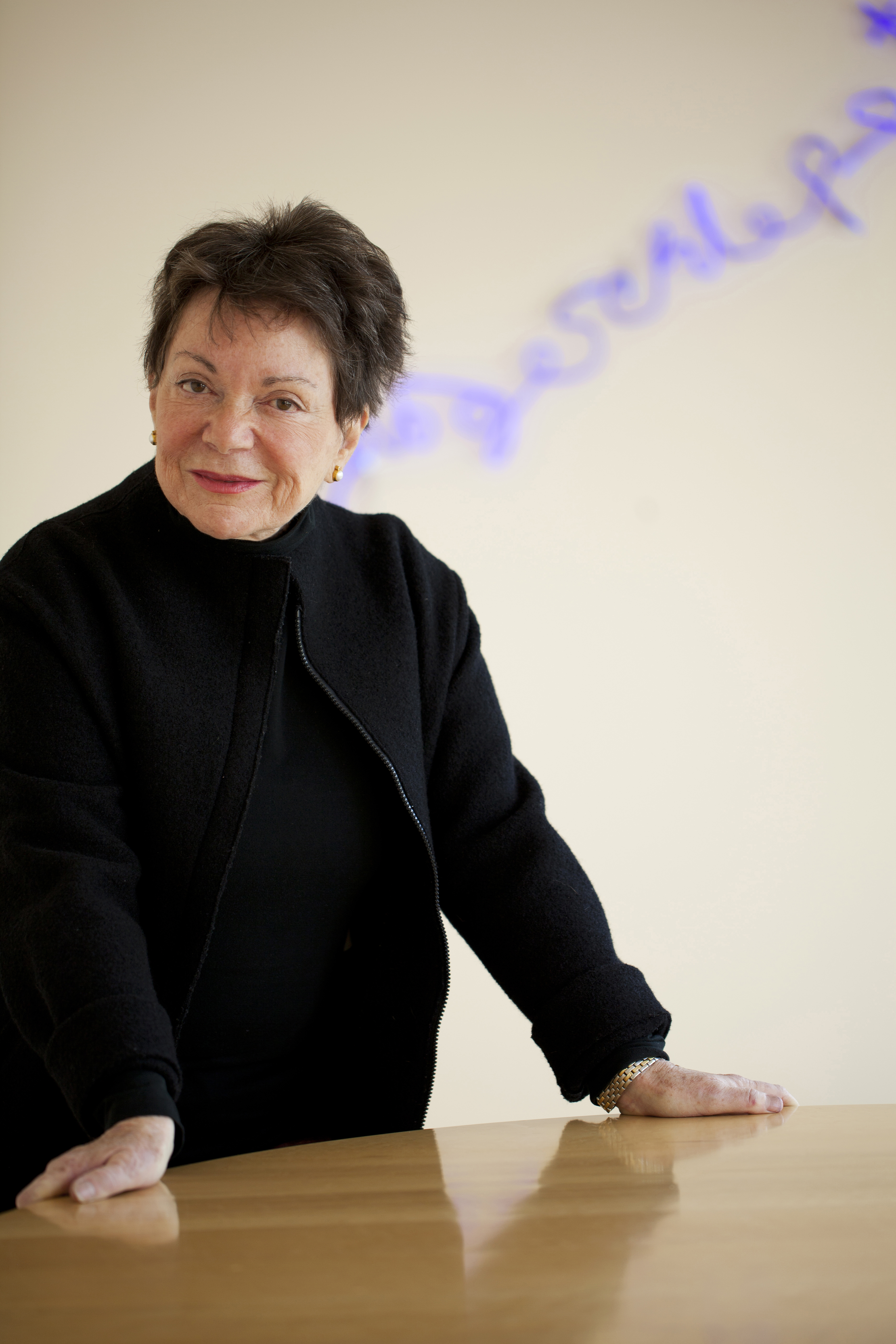
Madelin Coit (2012)

Madelin Coit is an American multi-disciplinary artist whose career began in the 1970s. In her work, Coit has produced numerous series across media, including sprayed-oil paintings, drawings, prints, sculpture, installation, video projection, writing, performance, steel, neon, and shadow. Her work is in the collections of the State of New Mexico, the Port Authority of New York and New Jersey, the Skirball Cultural Center in Los Angeles, and the Museum of Fine Arts in Santa Fe.

== Early life and education ==
Coit graduated from the University of Connecticut in 1968 with a Bachelor of Fine Arts. In 1971, she moved from Boston, Massachusetts to California to begin graduate coursework at CalArts Design School and to pursue her creative work.

== Artwork ==
Coit works simultaneously in different media: drawing with graphite, engineered paper, reworked found objects, shadows, steel, neon, installation, performance and video. She explores physical and emotional perception, and the way understanding or feelings appear to be and then change. Through the different media she uses, there is continuity in aesthetic and intention.

Coit has a history of working with language and signage, with many of her works taking the form of poetic messages.

Two recurring themes are often in her works – One is the mystery of interface, the edge or the space that separates one thing or place from another, defining both sides. The other concept is that of pentimento, a painting term about transparency, layering, and visual seepage.

The resulting work is created through a process layered, aggregated, and deconstructed materials to form a whole, which can then be erased, built upon, torn down, and reconstructed.

=== Exhibitions ===
Coit's work was first featured in the 1970 group show titled 'Project 70' at the Institute of Contemporary Art in Boston, Massachusetts. She then began exhibiting in the greater Los Angeles area in 1978. In 1986 her work was featured at Gallery Q in Tokyo, Japan in their show 'L.A. Art'. Her work has since been exhibited nationally at the Los Angeles County Museum, the Hammer Museum, the San Antonio Art Institute, The Whitney Center for the Arts, and the Anchorage Museum. In 2006 and 2012, Madelin received grants from Creative Capital for professional development, and participated in a resulting exhibition at 516 ARTS in 2007. In New Mexico, she has shown work in Santa Fe at the New Mexico Museum of Art, the Center for Contemporary Arts, SITE Santa Fe, AXLE Contemporary, Gerald Peters Gallery, The Hardwood Art Center, and the now-closed Evo Gallery and James Kelly Contemporary.

=== Awards and honors ===
Madelin has been the recipient of artist residencies at Ucross, Jentel, Playa, and Hambidge. She sat on the board at SITE Santa Fe.
