= Judson B. Coit Observatory =

Observatory in Massachusetts, US

- Organization: Boston University; Department of Astronomy
- Location: Boston, Massachusetts, USA
- Coordinates: 42°21′00.90″N 71°06′19.34″W
- Altitude: 32 m (105 ft)
- Website: www.bu.edu/astronomy/facilities/observatory.html

Telescopes
- Unnamed Schmidt-Cassegrain: 14-inch reflector
- Unnamed Schmidt-Cassegrain: 10-inch with a mounted 4-inch refractor guide scope
- Unnamed Telescope: 6½ inch refractor
- 4 Schmidt-Cassegrain telescopes: 8-inch Meade

Judson B. Coit Observatory is an astronomical observatory owned and operated by Boston University on the roof of the College of Arts & Sciences at 725 Commonwealth Avenue in Boston, Massachusetts, USA. The observatory is used in undergraduate and graduate courses of the Boston University Department of Astronomy, and for observing projects of the Boston University Astronomical Society.

Public Open Nights are held most Wednesday evenings throughout the year, weather permitting.

The Observatory is named for Judson Coit, the first Professor of Astronomy appointed by Boston University. It was originally located on the roof of the College of Liberal Arts Building on Boylston Street, occupied by Boston University from the early years of the 20th century until the late-1940s, when it was moved with the College of Liberal Arts (now College of Arts and Sciences) to its current location on Commonwealth Avenue

== See also ==
- List of astronomical observatories
