= St. Paul's School (New Hampshire) =

Boarding school in Concord, New Hampshire, United States

Location
- 325 Pleasant St. Concord, New Hampshire 03301; United States

Information
- Type: Private, boarding
- Motto: Latin: Ea discamus in terris quorum scientia perseveret in coelis (Let us learn those things on Earth the knowledge of which continues in Heaven)
- Religious affiliation: Episcopal Church
- Established: 1856; 170 years ago
- Founder: George Cheyne Shattuck Jr.
- CEEB code: 300110
- Rector: Kathleen Carroll Giles
- Faculty: 111 (2023-24)
- Grades: 9 to 12
- Gender: Coeducational
- Enrollment: 540 (2023-24)
- International students: 22% (2023-24)
- Student to teacher ratio: 5:1 (2023-24)
- Campus size: 2,000 acres (809 ha)
- Campus type: Suburban
- Houses: 19 (9 boys', 9 girls', 1 all-gender)
- Student council: StudCo (founded 1918)
- Colors: Red & white
- Song: "Love Divine"
- Athletics: 51 interscholastic teams 17 interscholastic sports 8 intramural
- Athletics conference: Lakes Region League
- Mascot: Pelican
- Nickname: Big Red
- Accreditation: NEASC
- Newspaper: The Pelican
- Endowment: $759.3 million (June 2024)
- Annual tuition: $68,353 (2024-25)
- Affiliations: ESA; NAES; NAIS; TABS; TSAO
- Acceptance rate: 13% (2024)
- Faculty with advanced degrees: 77% (2023-24)
- Students receiving financial aid: 38%
- Website: sps.edu

St. Paul's School (also known as St. Paul's or SPS) is a college-preparatory, coeducational boarding school in Concord, New Hampshire, affiliated with the Episcopal Church. The school's 2,000-acre (8.1 km^{2}), or 3.125 square mile, campus serves 540 students, who come from 37 states and 28 countries.

Established in 1856 to educate boys from upper-class families, St. Paul's later became one of the first boys' boarding schools to admit girls. U.S.-based families with annual household incomes of $150,000 or below generally attend for free.

The school's list of notable alumni includes U.S. Secretary of State John Kerry, Nobel laureate John Franklin Enders, and media baron William Randolph Hearst.

== History ==
=== Early history ===
In 1856, Boston physician George Cheyne Shattuck Jr., the future dean of Harvard Medical School, converted his summer home in Millville, New Hampshire (a satellite town of Concord) into a boarding school for boys. Inspired by the educational theories of Johann Heinrich Pestalozzi, who believed that classroom learning should be balanced with the "direct experience of the senses," Shattuck wanted his two sons educated in the austere, bucolic countryside. He hoped that eventually, the school would "educate the sons of [other] wealthy inhabitants of large cities."

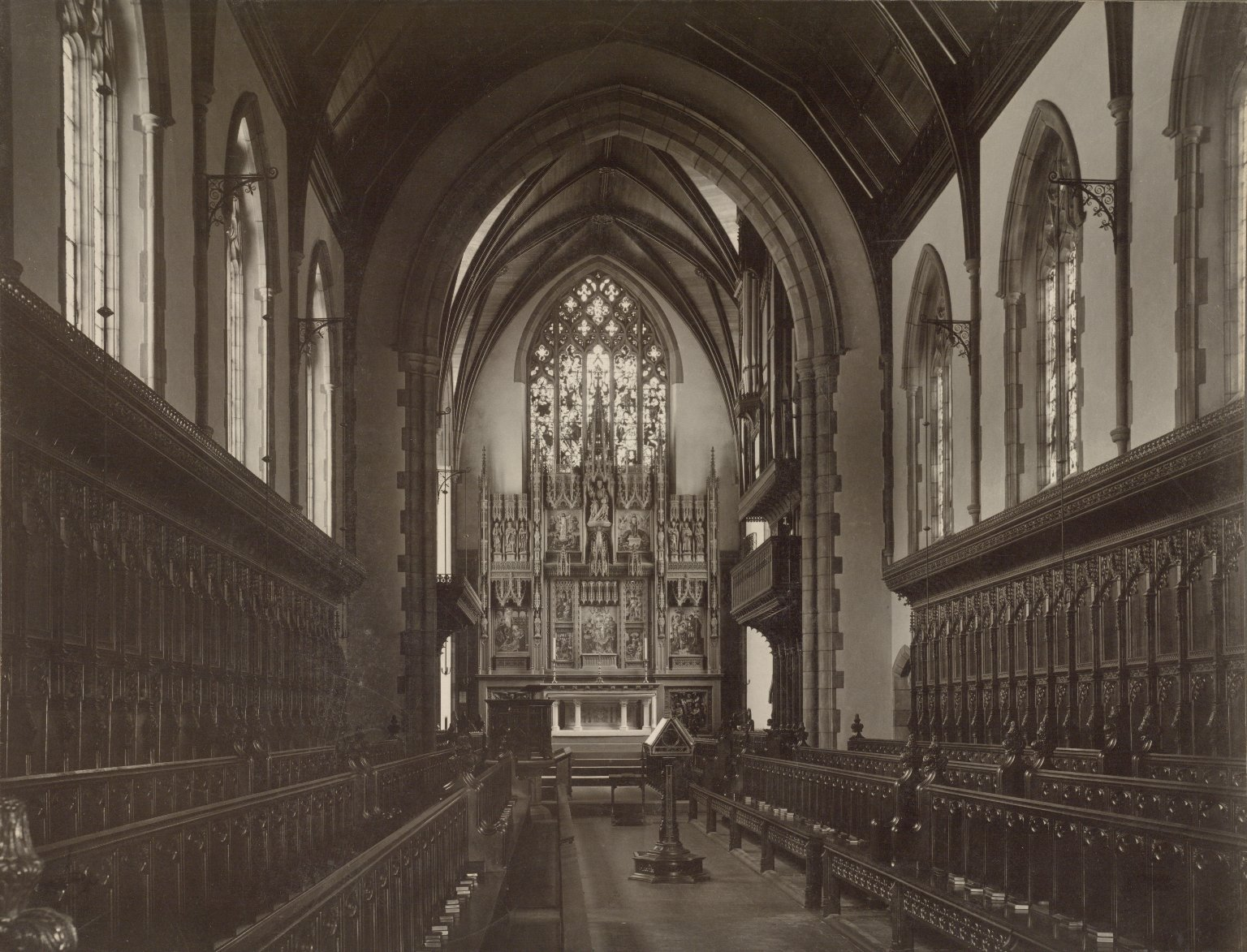
The lavish decorations of the Chapel of St. Peter and St. Paul (1888) reflected the school's high church, Anglo-Catholic ethos.

For the first fifty years of St. Paul's history, it was run by two brothers, Henry Augustus Coit (r. 1856–95) and Joseph Howland Coit (r. 1895–1906). An Anglophile, Henry Coit endeavored to make St. Paul's an American equivalent of an English public school, importing Anglicisms such as "forms," "removes," "evensong," and "matins." The school's religious services were Anglo-Catholic, and enrollment was initially limited to Episcopalians. In the 1890s, Coit also attempted to ban baseball in favor of cricket; the SPS cricket team toured New England and Canada.

SPS almost immediately attracted an upper-class clientele. Shattuck had attended Round Hill School, a short-lived experimental school that was "the most famous American school of its time." Founded in 1823, Round Hill was one of Harvard College's top feeder schools, and "offered an excellent but very expensive education" with "an elegant lifestyle," including "servants, stables, and tours of the estates of prominent Bostonians." Although it shut down in 1834, it left a strong impression on Shattuck, who believed that in the isolation of a boarding school, attentive teachers could better foster "physical and moral culture" in their students. Roughly 70 percent of Round Hill families eventually sent children to St. Paul's.

The school started with just three students, but grew quickly. By the mid-1860s, it was already filled to capacity, leading an SPS parent to establish St. Mark's School. Enrollment reached 204 students by 1878 and 345 students by 1895. Although the school (founded by Bostonians) was initially not associated with the New York upper class, SPS gradually extended its reach to New York and the Philadelphia Main Line. By 1894, there were only six students from Boston. In 1923, the school educated 199 students from New York and 26 from Massachusetts.

=== College feeder ===
The Coits' immediate successor, Henry Ferguson (r. 1906–11), left after just five years. In 1910, Samuel Drury (r. 1911–38) assumed control of the school. He presided over what the school historian called its "Augustan age." Drury stayed at St. Paul's for twenty-seven years. Along the way, he declined the rectorship of Manhattan's Trinity Church—at the time the nation's wealthiest congregation—and the bishopric of Pennsylvania.

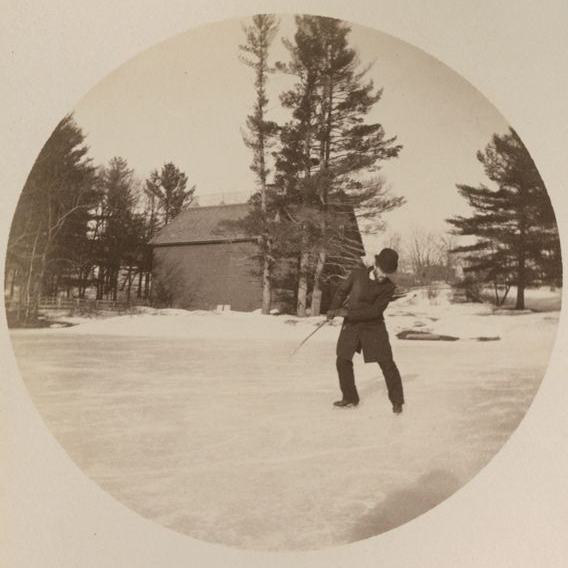
James P. Conover (Form of 1876) taught at SPS from 1882 to 1915. He is credited with bringing ice hockey and squash to both St. Paul's and the United States.

Like other leading New England prep schools of the period, SPS was not founded as a college-preparatory school: of the first 70 graduates, only five went directly to college. That is not to say they did not eventually go to college. Some early SPS alumni, including its first-ever student, simply took a gap year to attend cram schools like Dixwell's in Boston. However, by the Drury era, times were changing. Ferguson had recognized that parents were increasingly interested in sending their sons to college, but was not able to implement his ideas.

Drury turned SPS into one of America's most reliable feeder schools to Ivy League universities. Although Drury shared some of Henry Coit's skepticism about higher education—he once wrote in his annual report that a quarter of every St. Paul's class should be encouraged to forego college —he significantly improved St. Paul's academic reputation. He hired better teachers, tightened academic standards, and reestablished student discipline. Universities were attracted to the kind of well-schooled, upper-class young men that schools like St. Paul's produced in large quantities. In 1934, 95% of St. Paul's graduates matriculated at Harvard, Yale, or Princeton. In addition, in 1940 (shortly after Drury's death), 77 students applied to Harvard from the "St. Grottlesex" schools (of which St. Paul's was the largest member), and only one was rejected.

Drury also sought to democratize the student body and curtail snobbery among the richer students. Although St. Paul's was heavily oversubscribed—in 1920 it received over 1,600 applications for just over 100 openings—Drury set aside 10 slots a year for the winners of a competitive examination, dryly explaining that "we try to admit every son of an alumnus," but also "wish to admit every boy with high marks." A capable fundraiser, Drury raised the school's financial endowment from $1.1 million in 1920 to $3.6 million in 1930, and conducted a $1.6 million fundraising campaign that primarily went towards student financial aid. From 1920 to 1938, the share of SPS students on scholarship nearly tripled, from roughly 6% to 17%. Starting in 1922, Drury and his successors froze tuition at $1,400 for 22 consecutive years.

=== Turbulence and reform ===
Norman Nash (r. 1939–47) guided the school through World War II before leaving to become the Bishop of Massachusetts. He was succeeded by Henry Kittredge (r. 1947–54), the first SPS rector who was not an Episcopal minister. Although Kittredge questioned colleges' increasing reliance on standardized tests in college admissions, he was generally able to sustain SPS' enviable college placement record. In 1953, SPS sent 78% of its students to Harvard, Yale, or Princeton, second among New England boarding schools.

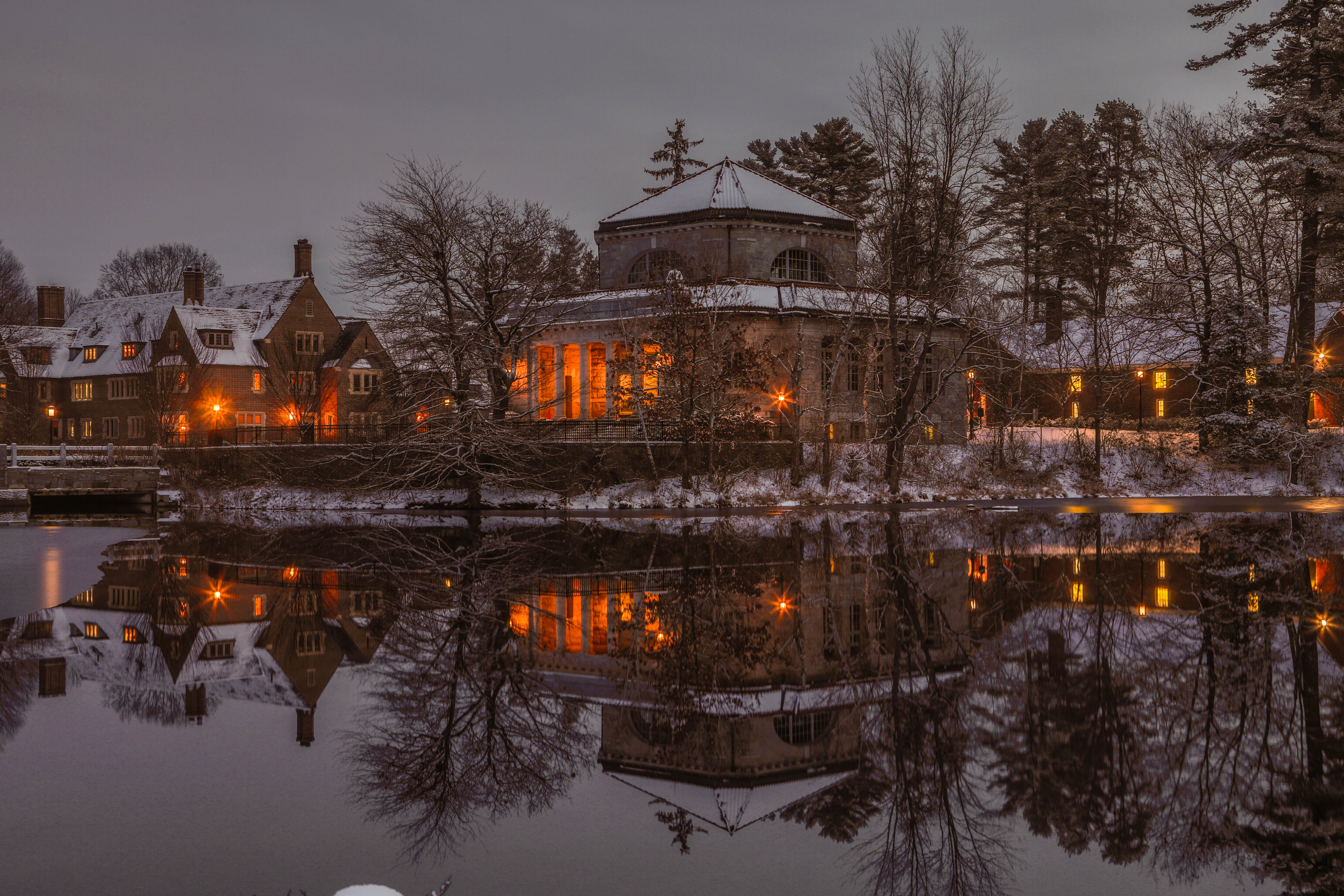
Sheldon Library was built in 1901. It currently hosts the school's admissions office.

Under Matthew Warren (r. 1954–70), the school underwent significant changes. Tuition was increased to $1,800; applications increased significantly despite rising tuition, aided by an improving economy; and the campus was substantially renovated. As competition for spots at SPS increased, Warren conciliated the alumni, many of whom wanted to send their own sons to SPS. He announced that under his watch, SPS would not "use scholarship funds to entice the unusually able boy to our school." It was an ill-timed concession, as colleges were receiving the same flood of applications as boarding schools and took the opportunity to tighten their own standards for admission. By 1967 the proportion of SPS graduates going on to Harvard, Yale, or Princeton had nearly halved from 1953. Warren personally visited Yale president Kingman Brewster to ask him to reverse course. Brewster replied that Yale would accept students from the top 40% of the SPS class, but was no longer interested in bottom-half SPS students.

The school gradually opened its doors to a broader cross-section of America. The school scrapped its Episcopalians-only rule, although not without some hiccups. In 1939, Rose Kennedy withdrew Robert F. Kennedy from the school after just one month because she believed its culture was still anti-Catholic; in the late 1950s the school allowed John Kerry '62 to attend Mass off campus as long as he also attended the school's Episcopal Sunday chapel services later that day; and by the end of the 1960s, Catholics were no longer required to attend Protestant services on campus. Asian students have attended since 1949 at the latest, when future Mitsubishi Corporation CEO Minoru Makihara spent a postgraduate year at SPS. SPS' first black faculty member (John T. Walker) and student arrived in 1957 and 1959, respectively. Warren's last major achievement was coeducation: in May 1970, shortly before he stepped down, the board of trustees agreed to begin admitting girls in 1971. Nonetheless, the tail end of Warren's tenure marked the start of a turbulent period for St. Paul's. In 1968, students wrote an acerbic manifesto describing the school administration as an oppressive regime, and issued demands for change.

St. Paul's rode out the storm under Warren's successor William Oates (r. 1970–82). According to Alex Shoumatoff '64, Oates applied "the prevailing educational and developmental thinking of the day, that schools should not be repressive and that adolescents should be free to experiment and try out different identities." He conciliated the students by offering them the opportunity to participate in disciplinary decisions. He also accepted several of the demands that the students had made in 1968. In the following years, seated meals were reduced from three times a day to four times a week, courses were shortened to be terms (rather than years) long, mandatory (non-Sunday) chapel attendance was reduced to four times a week, and the school's grading system was changed to ease student competition. Oates doubled the size of the school's endowment with a $30 million fundraising campaign. He also expanded the arts program.

=== Emergence into modern era ===
Shortly after Oates retired, SPS became part of the first class of private schools inducted into the National Blue Ribbon Schools Program, in the 1983–84 school year. However, by the 1980s and 1990s, the board of trustees wanted the administration to exercise a firmer hand over the school. They confronted St. Paul's emerging image (warranted or not) as a "party school"—a poll found that 80% of the students were using drugs—and sought to restore faculty discipline over the students. In July 2020, alumna Lacy Crawford wrote that in 1991, when she was a fifteen-year-old student, she had been raped by multiple SPS students. She accused SPS of a cover-up. The school issued a statement that it would "honor her desire that the school acknowledge its failings, accept responsibility, and work, not just promise, to do better." Crawford later disclosed that the school had issued her a written apology and that she was pleased with its response.

In 1992, the board appointed David Hicks (r. 1992–96) as rector and ordered him to improve the school's academic reputation, as "[n]obody had gone to Harvard in five years, except for legacies." Hicks introduced an interdisciplinary humanities curriculum which the school still employs today. Although the faculty eventually forced him to resign, the school rebounded academically. In 1996, SPS sent 39% of students to Ivy League colleges, the highest figure among a sample of 20 (mainly) Northeastern boarding schools, and 6% clear of its closest competitor. In 2001, it ranked fifth among boarding schools and fifteenth in the nation in a study of which schools sent the most students to Harvard, Yale, and Princeton.

The campus has received several major updates since 1990. The new Ohrstrom Library, designed by Robert A. M. Stern and Carroll Cline, opened in 1991. A 95,000-square-foot athletic center opened in 2004. The following year, Rector Craig B. Anderson (r. 1997–2005) retired under pressure from parents and alumni, who alleged that he maintained substantial compensation and perks at a time when the school was trying to cut back on expenses. The state attorney general investigated the issue, resulting in a settlement agreement and an Internal Revenue Service audit. Anderson's successors have continued modernizing the campus.

In 2015, a former student, Owen Labrie, was convicted of a felony after a non-consensual sexual encounter with 15-year-old freshman Chessy Prout. (Note: Labrie was convicted on both felony and misdemeanor charges, including using a computer to solicit sex (a felony) and statutory rape (a misdemeanor). However, the jury acquitted him of the most serious charge, felony sexual assault, which one expert characterized as "a compromise among the jurors.") He was sentenced to one year in jail, serving eight months. At trial, Labrie's defense attorney—whose fees were allegedly paid for by SPS alumni—blamed his client's actions on the school, claiming that Labrie had been led to believe that he was continuing a decades-long "tradition" of the "senior salute" in which seniors would proposition younger classmates for sexual encounters before graduation, and that SPS had failed to stop that tradition. Other members of the SPS community claimed that the "senior salute" was a recent invention, not more than three years old. The prosecutors agreed that the school's culture provided relevant context for Labrie's crimes, but responded that regardless of the culture, Labrie was responsible for his actions. SPS confidentially settled a civil suit filed by Prout's parents in 2018, and Prout published a book about the incident later that year.

In 2019, Kathleen Giles became the fourteenth rector of St. Paul's. She had previously served as the head of Middlesex School from 2003 to 2019. Before that, she was the dean of academic affairs at Groton School. Under her administration, St. Paul's bills itself as "one of the nation's only 100% boarding high schools"; nearly all of its competitors enroll some day students.

==== 2017–2018 reports on sexual misconduct (1948–2009) and criminal investigation ====
In 2016, the Boston Globe published an article implicating a former SPS teacher in sexual misconduct during his time at a different school. After the article was published, SPS issued a public invitation to its alumni to report incidents of sexual misconduct during their time on campus. It also retained the law firm of former Massachusetts Attorney General Scott Harshbarger to conduct an investigation. Harshbarger's team issued an initial report in May 2017. It also published follow-up reports in September 2017 and August 2018 outlining additional allegations of sexual misconduct that SPS received after the publication of the May 2017 report. The initial report was limited to the period between 1948 and 1988, and the follow-up reports addressed allegations of misconduct through 2009.

Altogether, the three reports substantiated allegations of misconduct against twenty former SPS employees (including future politician Gerry Studds), which included assaults, harassment, and rape. The investigators concluded that allegations against fifteen other SPS employees were unsubstantiated, and lacked sufficient information to reach an conclusion with respect to thirteen other SPS employees.

In July 2017, the New Hampshire Attorney General, with assistance from Concord police and the New Hampshire State Police, opened a criminal investigation into the school to determine whether administrators engaged in conduct that endangered the welfare of students. In 2018, the state AG reached a settlement agreement, which allowed the school to avoid criminal prosecution and required it to pay for an external compliance monitor to review any further reports of sexual misconduct by SPS employees. In 2019, the school removed the names of two rectors from campus buildings, explaining that they had mishandled abuse claims during their respective tenures.

In 2020, the monitor resigned, claiming that the school was obstructing his investigations and that an administrator had verbally abused him. The school eventually agreed to hire a new monitor, to add funding for an assistant monitor, and to hire the Rape, Abuse & Incest National Network to conduct a study of the school's anti-abuse policies. The school was not required to re-hire the original monitor. A replacement monitor released a report in 2021, noting that the school had hired an on-campus advocate to provide support for sexual assault survivors on a confidential basis. RAINN issued a report and recommendations in September 2022, noting that "St. Paul's leadership has made a number of process improvements in recent years."

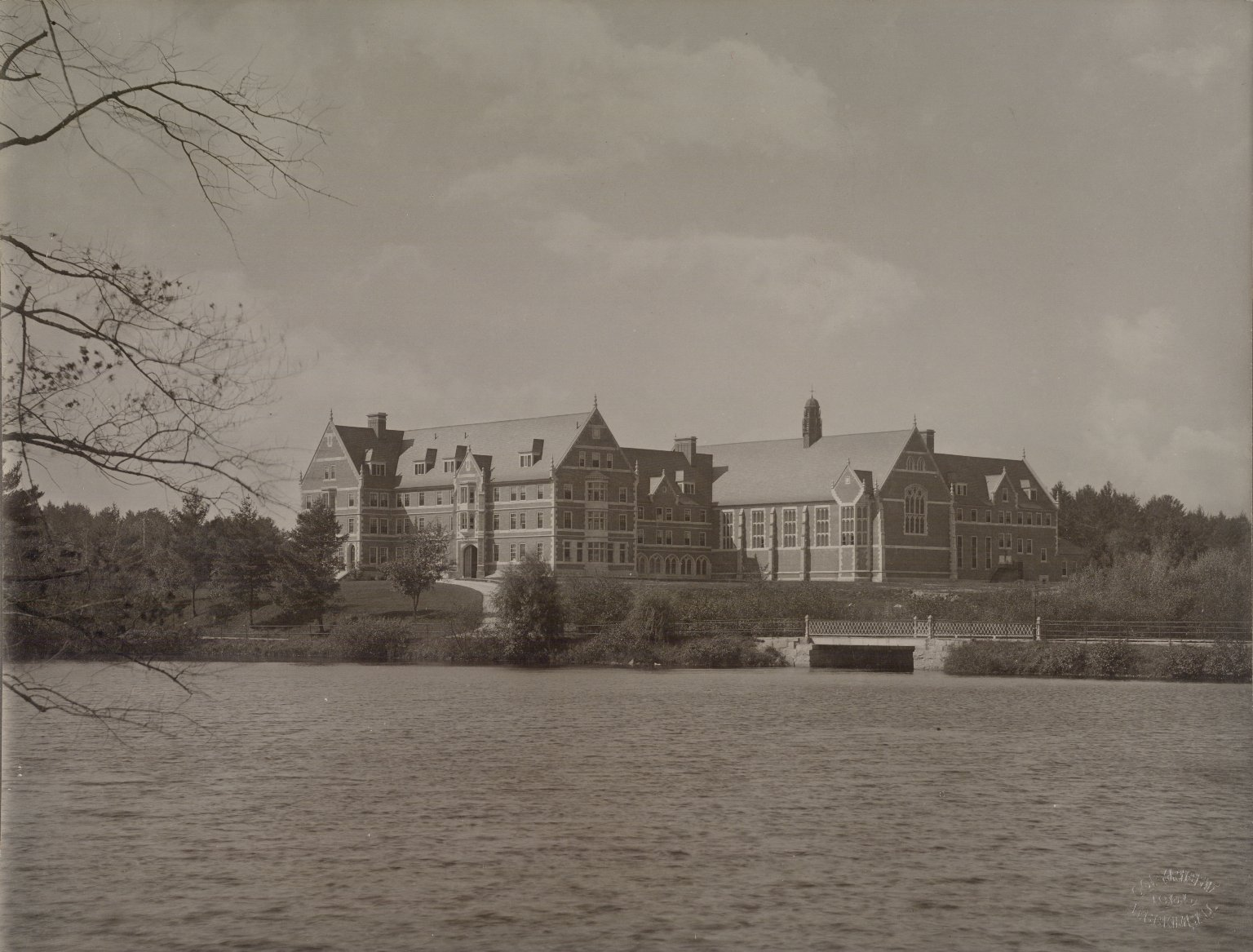
The Upper School c. 1905

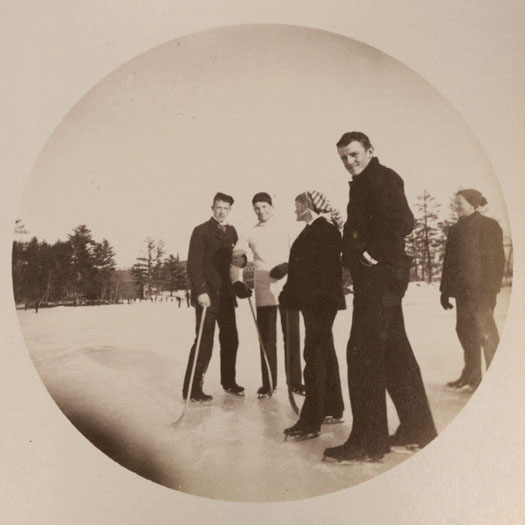
Students on the ice of Lower School Pond, 1890

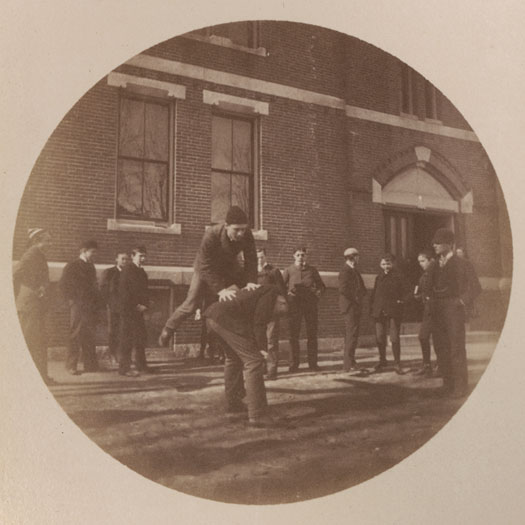
Students playing leap frog outside the Big Study, 1890

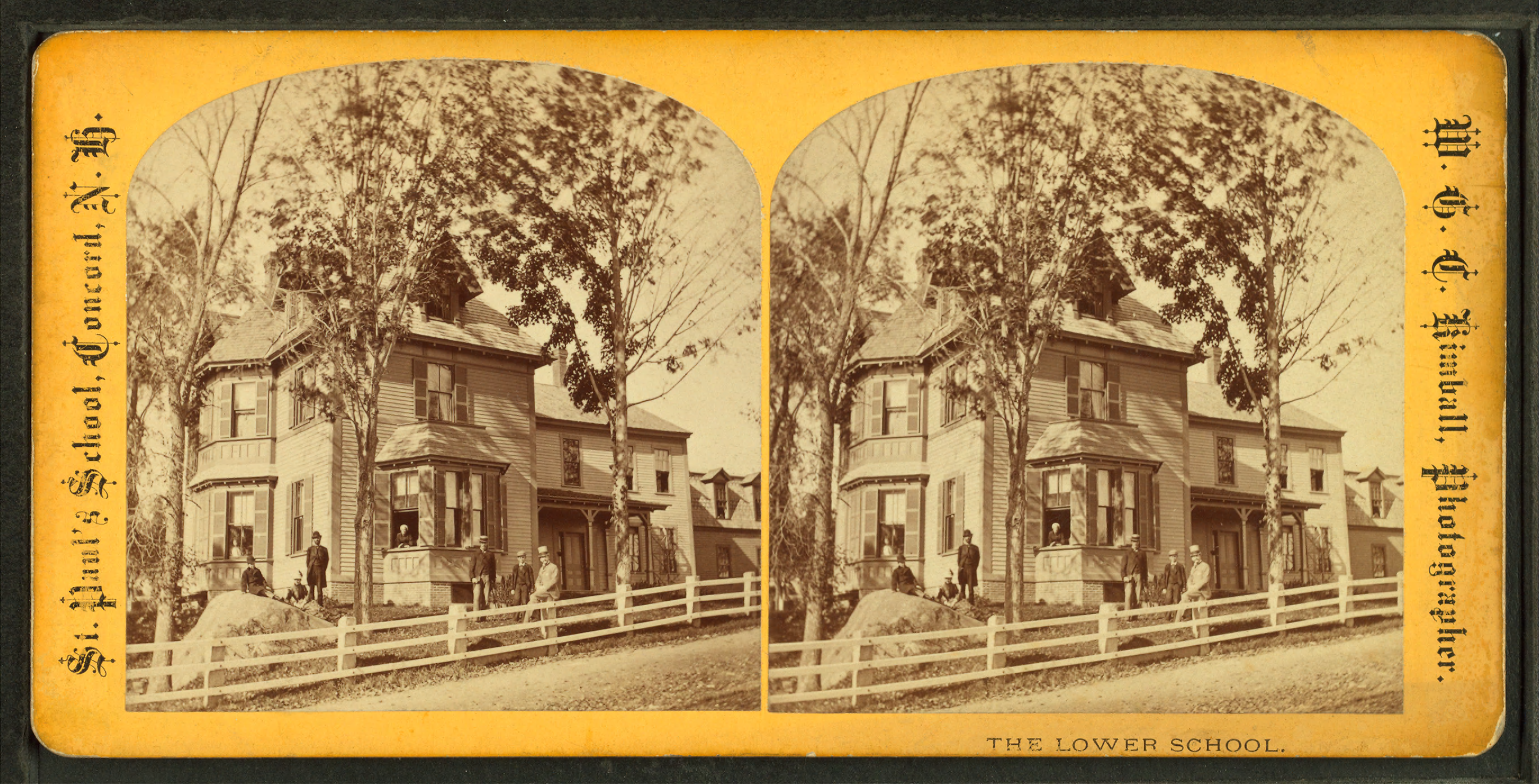
"The Lower School"

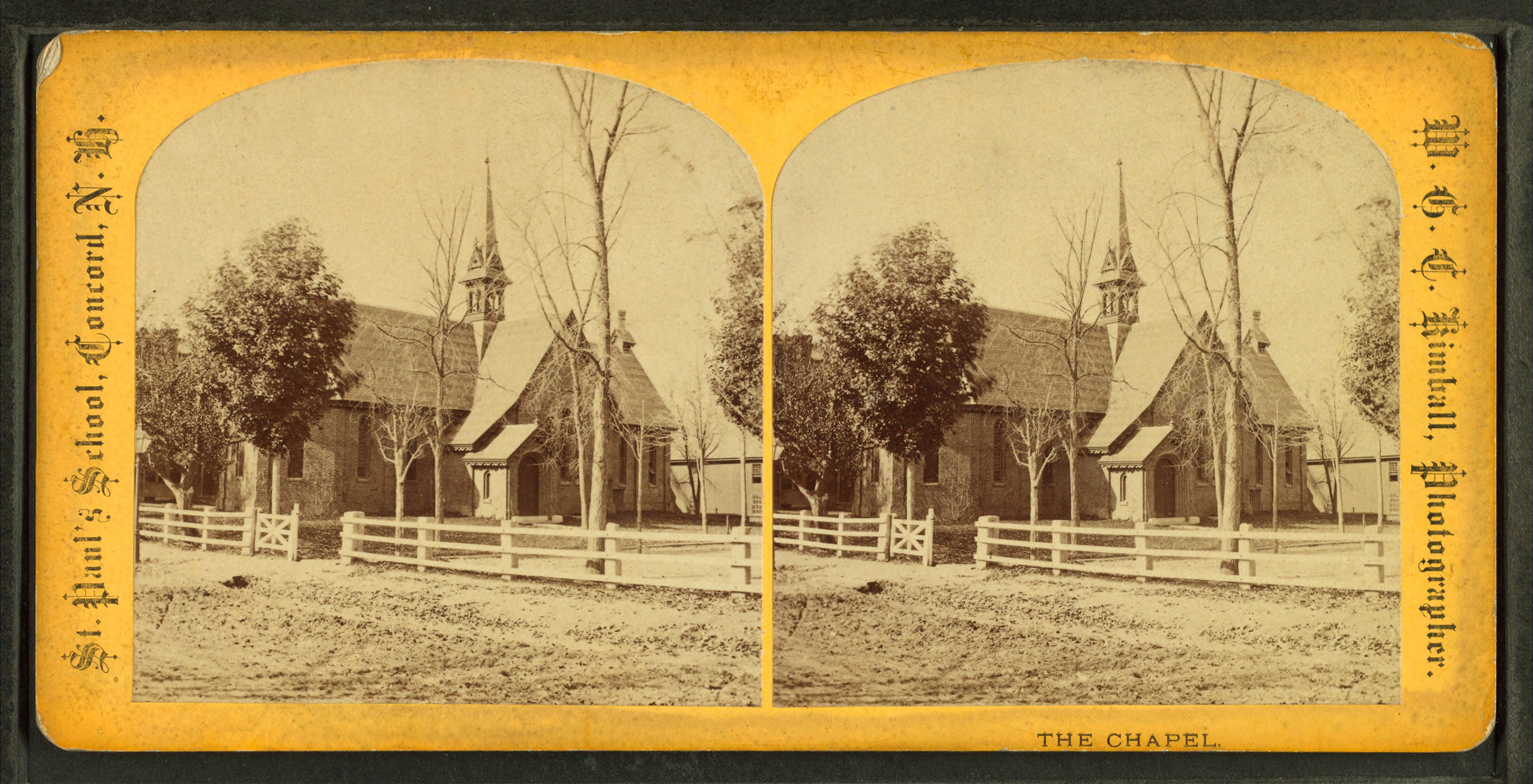
"The [Old] Chapel"

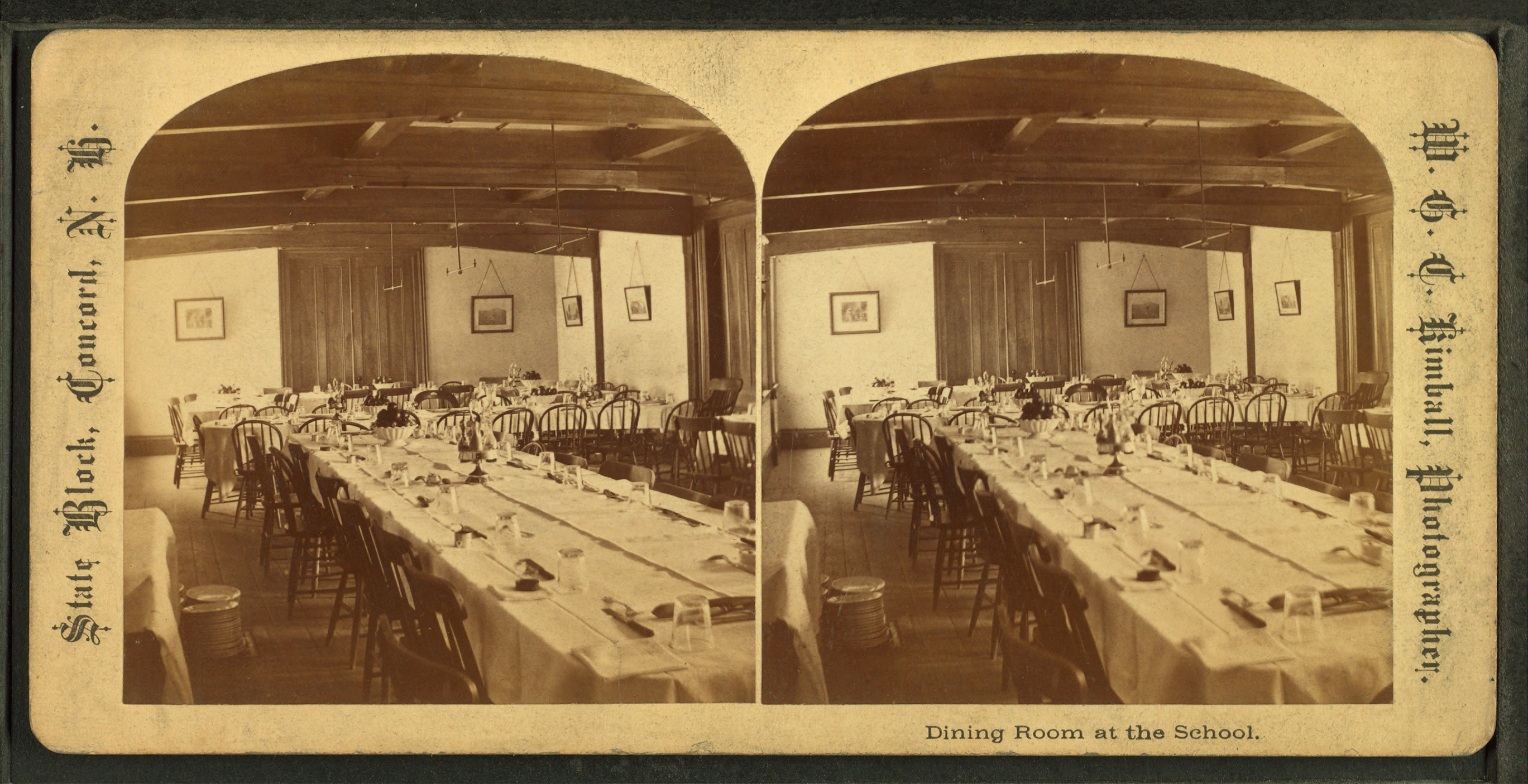
"Dining Room at the School"

== Facilities ==
The school's rural campus is familiarly known as "Millville," after a now-abandoned mill whose relic still stands in the woods near the Lower School Pond. When St. Paul's was founded, its campus covered 50 acres. Today, the campus stretches over 2,000 acres, the overwhelming majority of which is undeveloped wildland and woodland. The campus itself includes four ponds and the upper third of the Turkey River. In 2018, Architectural Digest named St. Paul's the most beautiful private high school campus in New Hampshire.

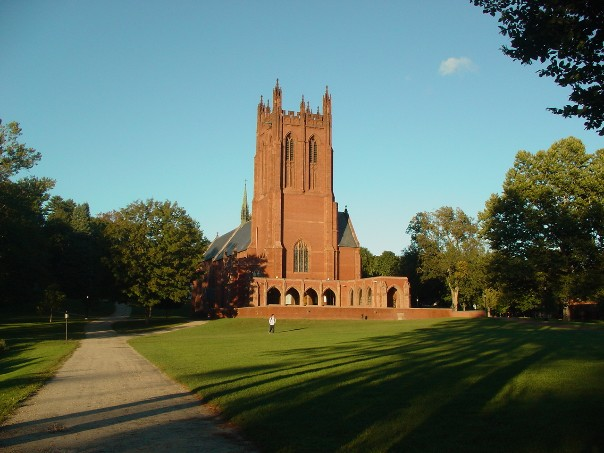
The Chapel of St. Peter and St. Paul (also known as the New Chapel)

The centerpiece of the campus is the Chapel of St. Peter and St. Paul (informally the "New Chapel"), constructed between 1886 and 1888. It was designed by Henry Vaughan, and was one of the first American chapels to employ Perpendicular Gothic. Although Vaughan was the architect of Washington National Cathedral, an architecture critic at Princeton University called the New Chapel Vaughan's masterpiece, as Vaughan died before the cathedral was completed. SPS preserved the smaller Old Chapel, which dates back to 1858 and was the school's first building; it is now used for ceremonial events.

Overlooking the Lower School Pond, the Ohrstrom Library was remodeled in 2016 and is now home to 75,000 print books and almost half a million e-books in its digital archive. According to the alumni magazine, this "put[s] the school archives on par with some of the country’s major universities." Lindsay Center, the science and math building, contains a greenhouse and an observatory. The school is currently building a 16,000-square-foot admissions center, scheduled to open in early 2025.

There are 19 dorms: nine boys', nine girls', and one all-gender. Each houses between 20 and 40 students, and every dorm has members of all four forms. The architecture of the dormitories varies from the Collegiate Gothic style of the "Quad" dorms (built in 1927) to the spare, modern style of the Kittredge building (built in the early 1970s).

== Finances ==
=== Tuition and financial aid ===
St. Paul's offers need-based financial aid, and commits to meet 100% of demonstrated financial need for every admitted student. The school states that U.S.-based families with annual household incomes of $150,000 or below "generally qualify for full tuition support." Thirty-eight percent of SPS students are on financial aid, and the school's financial aid budget is roughly $12.6 million. Financial aid students admitted to SPS receive, on average, an 87% discount on frontline tuition. In the 2024–25 school year, St. Paul's charged students $68,353 plus fees, of which financial aid covered, on average, $60,500. Although most financial aid at St. Paul's is administered strictly on the basis of financial need, the school also offers some regional scholarships.

=== Endowment and expenses ===
As of June 30, 2024, St. Paul's disclosed in its 2023-24 Annual Report that its financial endowment stands at $759.3 million, equivalent to approximately $1.4 million per student. In its Internal Revenue Service filings for the 2021–22 school year, SPS reported total assets of $953.8 million, net assets of $854.6 million, investment holdings of $724.4 million, and cash holdings of $14.9 million. SPS also reported $64.7 million in program service expenses and $10.9 million in grants (primarily student financial aid).

St. Paul's has historically been one of the wealthiest boarding schools in the United States. In 1978, Time magazine reported that St. Paul's had an endowment per student of $92,555 ($440,524 in February 2024 dollars), nearly two-thirds more than second-placed Groton. A 2009 study found that Exeter ($987,000) had passed St. Paul's ($827,000), and Andover ($722,000) and Hotchkiss ($716,000) were not far behind. However, in January 2019 St. Paul's was once again the wealthiest boarding school in New England, with an endowment per student of $1.19 million. Sociologist Shamus Khan, an alumnus of St. Paul's, stated the school's financial resources allow it to cultivate "an intentional diversity that few communities share or can afford."

== Admissions and student body ==
=== Admissions ===
In 2024, St. Paul's welcomed 141 new students and reported an admissions rate of 13%. The new students came from 24 states and 22 countries. Based on 2023 data, 71.7% of accepted students chose to enroll at SPS.

=== Diversity ===
In the 2023–24 school year, St. Paul's reported that 48% of its students identified as people of color and 22% were international students. The student body represented 37 states and 28 countries.

In the 2021–22 school year, St. Paul's reported that 62.4% of its students were white, 15.1% were Asian, 7.9% were black, 7.7% were Hispanic, 0.2% were Native American/Alaska Native, and 6.6% were multiracial. The survey did not permit the school to identify one student in multiple categories. At the end of the 2021–22 school year, SPS announced that 47% of its 158 incoming students were non-Caucasian and 19% came from abroad.

== Athletics ==
=== Notable sports ===
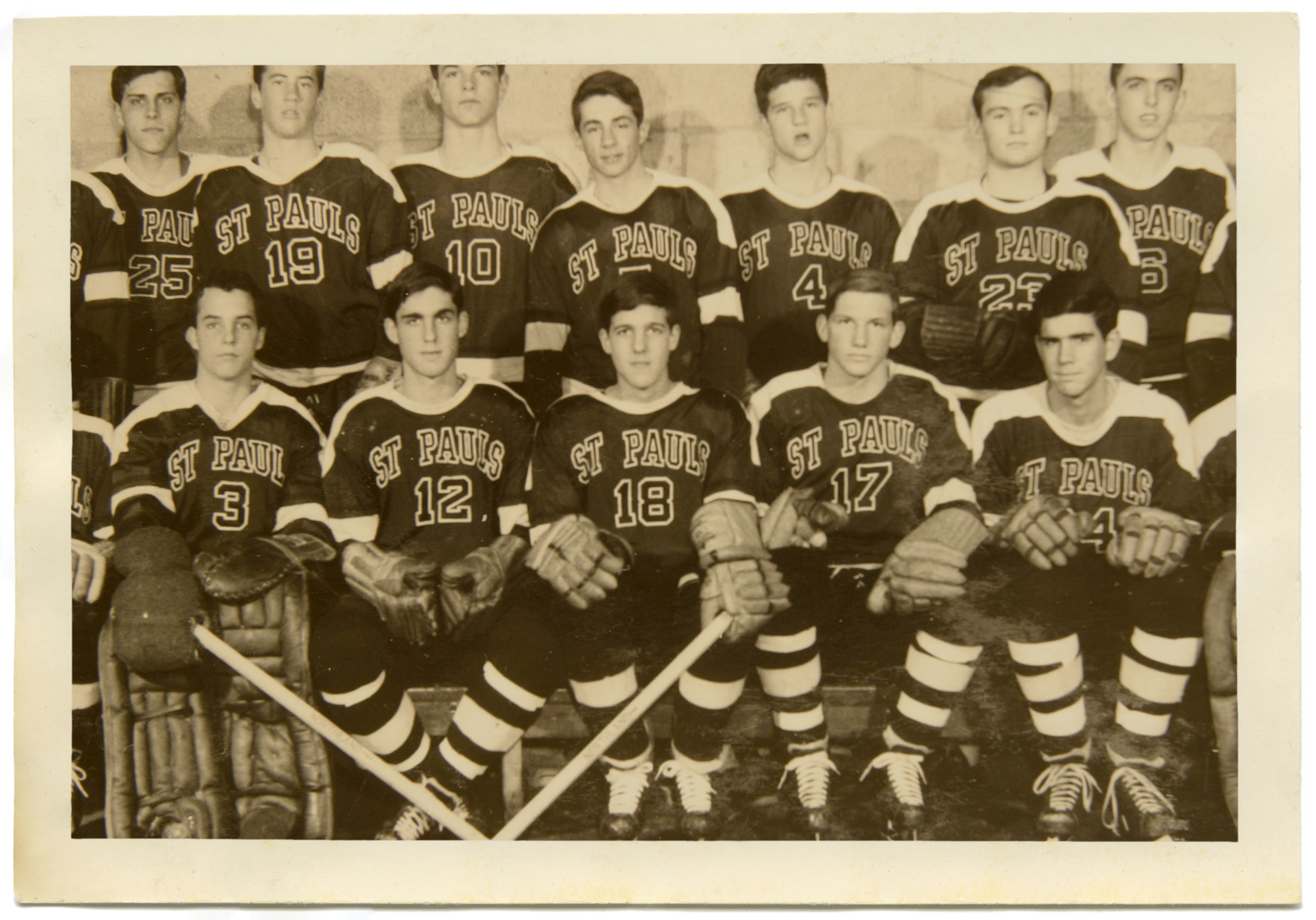
The 1962 SPS boys' ice hockey team. Team captain Robert Mueller (#12) and John Kerry (#18) are in the front row, second and third from the left. A hockey fan, Mueller went to SPS because it had seven hockey rinks.

George Shattuck supported outdoors education, and St. Paul's was "perhaps the first school in which the deed of gift accented physical development."

St. Paul's has a long tradition of ice hockey. The school, and the city of Concord more broadly, were early cradles for ice hockey in America.

- By some accounts, the first hockey game in the United States was played on the St. Paul's Lower School Pond on November 17, 1883, after SPS teacher James Potter Conover visited Montreal for Christmas and watched Canadian skaters play the game.
- In 1885, America's first written hockey rules were drafted at St. Paul's by schoolboy Malcolm Gordon '87. Gordon would go on to coach hockey at SPS from 1888 to 1917. He is a member of the U.S. Hockey Hall of Fame.
- Under Gordon and his successors, the school was a prominent force in early 20th-century American hockey, playing and beating collegiate teams, including Harvard and Princeton. SPS alumni may have founded the hockey programs at Harvard and Yale.
- American college hockey's award for the most outstanding male player is named after SPS alumnus Hobey Baker.

The first squash courts in the United States were built at St. Paul's in 1884. In addition to bringing hockey to the United States, Conover introduced an early variant of squash (squash tennis) to SPS.

The St. Paul's boys' and girls' crews have each won multiple titles in international competition. The boys' crew won the Princess Elizabeth Challenge Cup at the Henley Royal Regatta in 1980, 1994, and 2004. The girls' crew won the Peabody Cup at the Henley Women's Regatta in 1996, 1998, 2001, and 2019.

=== Conference affiliation ===
St. Paul's is a member of the Lakes Region League, an athletic conference of prep schools in New Hampshire and Vermont. It was previously a member of the Boston-centered Independent School League, but withdrew in 2017 due to league bylaws surrounding merit scholarships. In addition, the athletic directors of St. Paul's and the other members of the Eight Schools Association comprise the Eight Schools Athletic Council, which organizes sports events and tournaments among ESA schools.

== Daily life ==
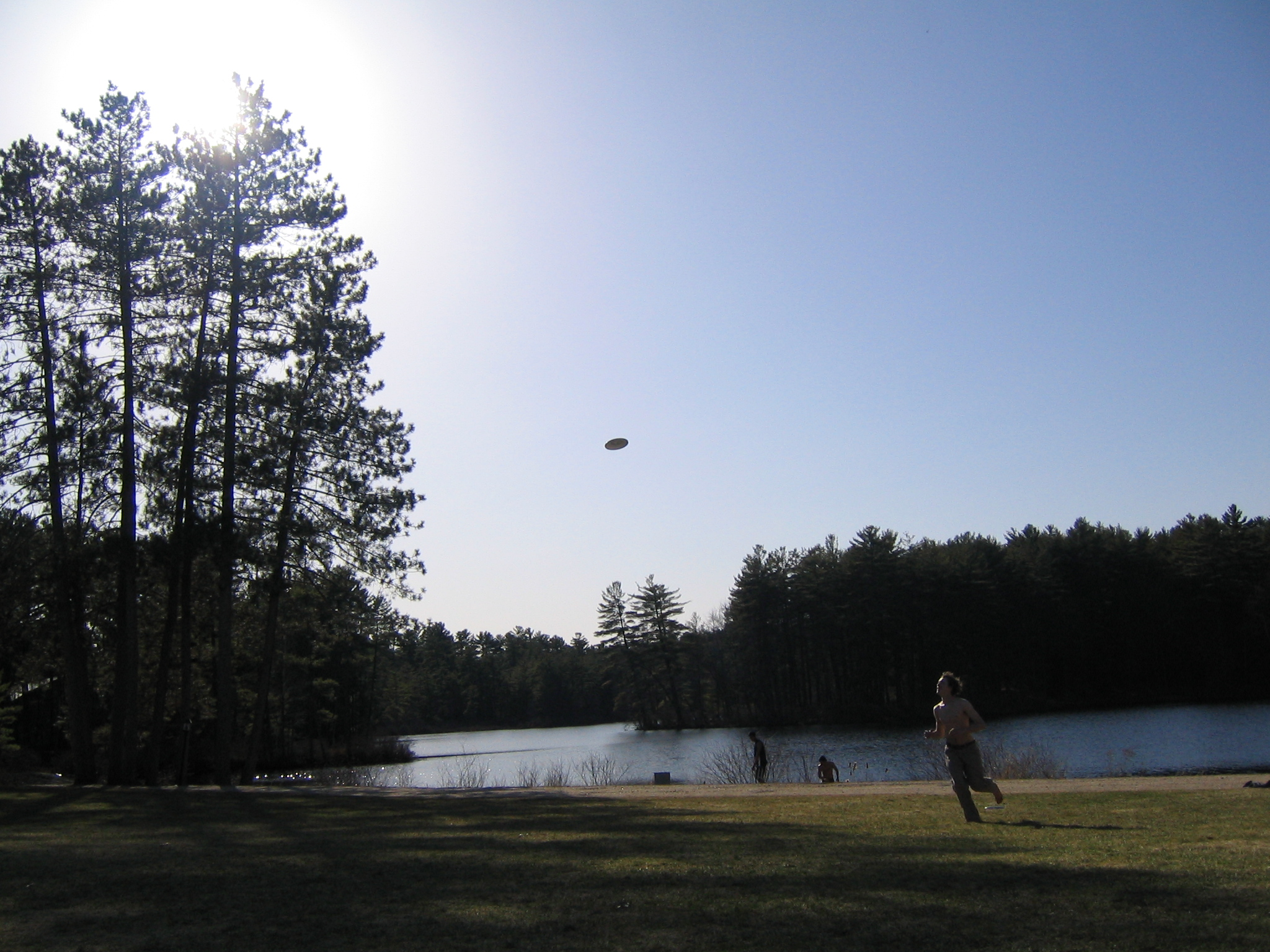
Students throw a disc around on the chapel lawn on a warm spring day.

St. Paul's conducts its Humanities classes using the Harkness method, which encourages discussion between students and the teacher, and between students.

=== Socialization ===
According to Shamus Khan, author of Privilege: The Making of an Adolescent Elite at St. Paul's School (2010) and a sociologist who is a St. Paul's alumnus, students are socialized to function as privileged holders of power and status in an open society. Privilege in meritocracy is acquired through talent, hard work, and a wide variety of cultural and social experiences. Economic inequality and social inequality are explained by the lack of talent, hard work, and limited cultural and social experience of the less privileged. Thus high status is earned, not based on entitlement. According to Khan, "Today what is distinct among the elite is not their exclusivity but their ease within and broad acceptance of a more open world."

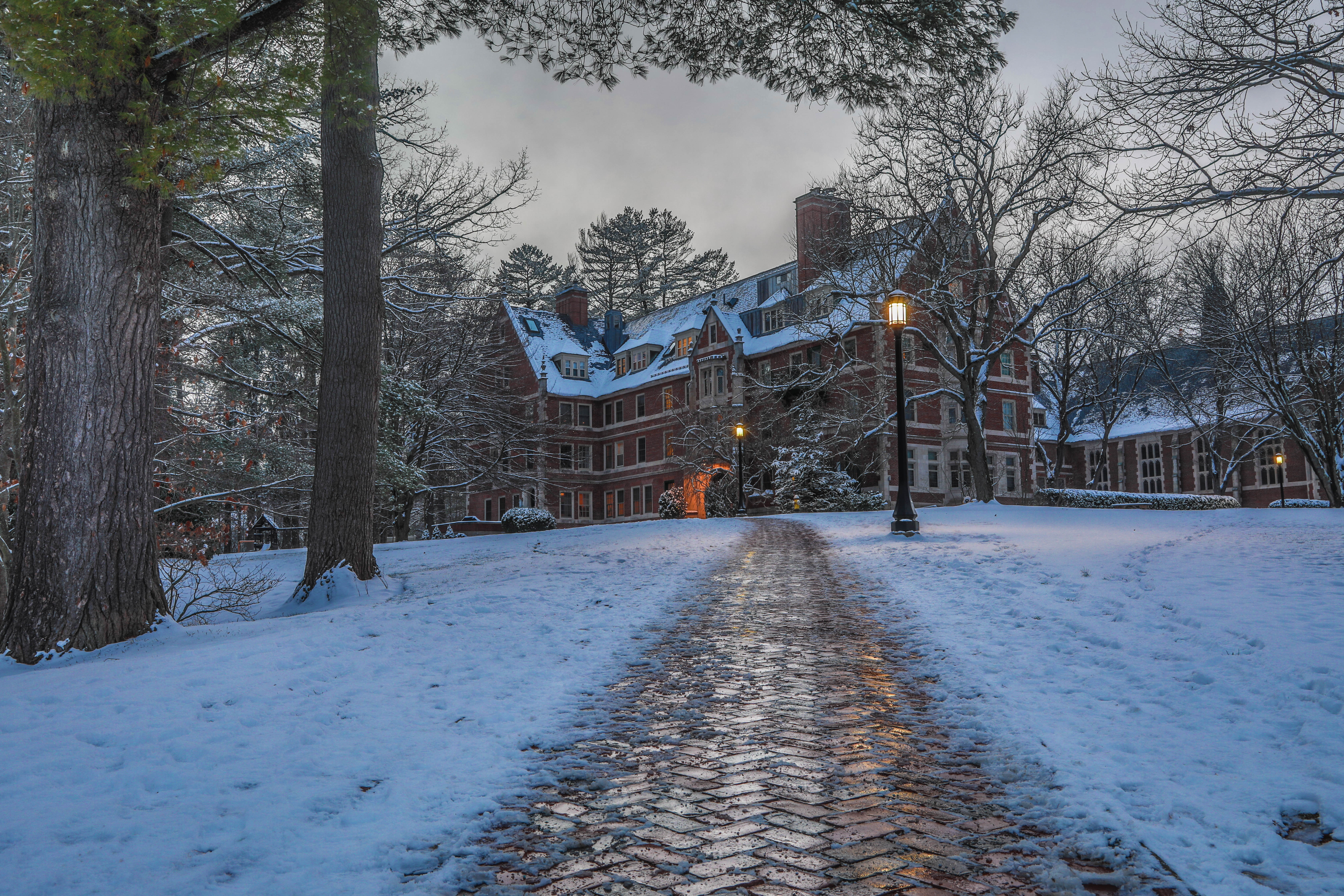
The Coit building, housing dining halls and the Coit dormitories

Hierarchy is embedded in the rituals and traditions of the school from the first day. According to Khan, the student advances up the ladder of the hierarchy embedded in the culture of the school.

=== Traditions ===
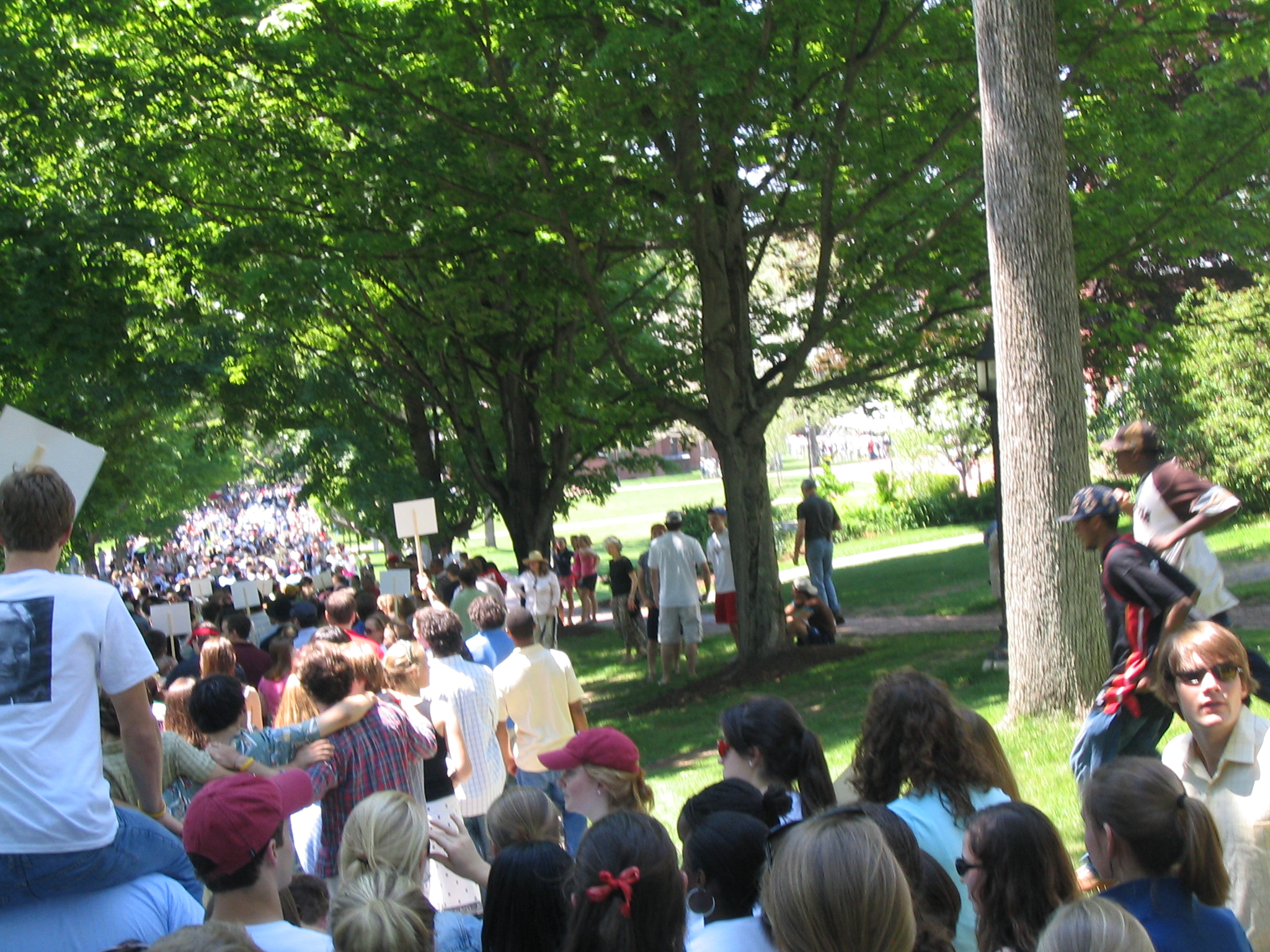
The 2005 Alumni Parade (see below) from all the way in the back

The annual Inter-House Inter-Club Race, known among students as the "Dorm Run," but now officially named the "Charles B. Morgan Run", takes place late in the fall term, usually in early to mid-November. Students are invited to earn points for their dorm and club by running in a 2-mile (3.2 km) cross country race. The current student record is 9:48, set in 2006 by Peter Harrison '07.

In the spring term, St. Paul's holds a school-wide public speaking contest called the Hugh Camp Cup. The finalists' speeches are delivered before the entire school, and the student body votes on a winner, whose name is engraved on the prize. Alumnus John Kerry achieved this distinction during his sixth form year.

St. Paul's students once had a close relationship with jam bands like the Grateful Dead. Some of the slang peculiar to St. Paul's originated as the "Pyramid Dialect" among St. Paul's students and alumni who followed the Grateful Dead's 1978 shows in Egypt. Phish played in the Upper Dining Hall on May 19, 1990. electro house artist Steve Aoki performed in the school's Athletic & Fitness Center on April 9, 2015.

== Advanced Studies Program ==
St. Paul's School founded the summer Advanced Studies Program in 1957 to provide juniors from public and parochial New Hampshire high schools with challenging educational opportunities. The students live and study at the St. Paul's campus for five and a half weeks and are immersed in their subject of choice. Recent offerings have included astronomy and Shakespeare. In addition to the course load, students choose a daily extracurricular activity or sport to participate in four afternoons per week. The program had a 37% admission rate in 2010. In 2014, 267 students from 78 high schools participated in the Advanced Studies Program.

== Notable alumni ==
In government, alumni include Secretary of State, Senator, and Presidential nominee John Kerry; three Senators; (Note: Daniel Brewster, John Kerry, Sheldon Whitehouse) ten Congressmen; (Note: Joseph C. Baldwin, Parker Corning, Harmar D. Denny Jr., Charles S. Dewey, William Randolph Hearst, Amo Houghton, John Lindsay, James Simpson Jr., Edward L. Stokes, Van Taylor) two state governors; (Note: Mark Gordon, John Gilbert Winant) New York City mayor John Lindsay; foreign policy experts Chip Bohlen and Norman Armour; Solicitor General Archibald Cox; and FBI Director Robert Mueller, the latter two of which also served as Special Counsel/Prosecutor to the Justice Department.

Other attorneys and public servants include Lloyd K. Garrison, a New Deal lawyer and name partner of Paul, Weiss; Maxwell Evarts, who successfully defended birthright citizenship in United States v. Wong Kim Ark; Francis Bohlen, the reporter for the Restatement of Torts; World Bank president Lewis Thompson Preston; and seven Episcopal bishops, including Presiding Bishop Frank Griswold. (Note: Frank Griswold, Mark Hollingsworth, Frederick Kinsman, Alexander Mackay-Smith, Paul Moore Jr., Anson Phelps Stokes, Philip M. Rhinelander)

In academia and research, alumni include Nobel laureate John Franklin Enders (Physiology or Medicine 1954), whose research contributed to the polio and measles vaccines; Swarthmore College president Theodore Friend; Smithsonian Institution director S. Dillon Ripley; and Metropolitan Museum of Art president Arthur Houghton.

In media and publishing, the school has educated heads of Hearst Communications (William Randolph Hearst); the New York Herald Tribune (Whitelaw Reid); the Boston Globe (William Davis Taylor and his son William O. Taylor II); and Charles Scribner's Sons (Charles Scribner III). While working at Scribner's, alumnus Maxwell Perkins popularized Fitzgerald and Hemingway. Pulitzer Prize winners Eliza Griswold, Samuel Eliot Morison, and Garry Trudeau attended the school.

On a lighter note, other alumni include managing owners of the Buffalo Sabres (Knox), Philadelphia Phillies (Potter), and Texas Rangers (Betts); Boston Bruins general manager Don Sweeney; professional poker players (and siblings) Howard Lederer and Annie Duke; Goodnight Moon illustrator Clement Hurd; and ornithologist James Bond.

Notable SPS families not covered above include Aldrich, Astor, Cadwalader, Garfield, Harkness, Hartford, Jennings, Mellon, Moore, Morgan, Pillsbury, Sheldon, Taft, and Vanderbilt.

== Notable faculty ==
- James Milnor Coit, teacher
- Henry Wadsworth Longfellow Dana, academic and activist
- George A. Gordon, United States Ambassador to Haiti and the Netherlands
- Richard Lederer, English teacher, author and compiler of humorous errors in the use of the English language
- Gerry Studds, who later served as U.S. congressman from Massachusetts
- John T. Walker, first African-American Episcopal bishop of Washington, D.C.
- John Gilbert Winant, governor of New Hampshire; ambassador to Great Britain during World War II

== See also ==
- Boarding school
- College-preparatory school
- Saint Grottlesex, a colloquial expression for several of the area's prep schools
