= Malcolm Gordon (ice hockey) =

Malcolm Kenneth Gordon (January 10, 1868 – November 13, 1964) was an ice hockey coach at St. Paul's School from 1888 to 1917.

Gordon was born in Baltimore, Maryland. In 1882, he arrived at St. Paul's in Concord, New Hampshire.

Hockey had been earlier introduced at St. Paul's from Canada, but Gordon is regarded as the individual who helped formalize the game by putting down on paper what is regarded as the first set of rules in the United States. This occurred in 1885; in 1888 he was made hockey coach. Play at St. Paul's was strictly intramural, but in 1896 Gordon took the first St. Paul's team to New York City to play at the old St. Nicholas Rink. In that first game the St. Paul's alumni defeated Gordon's team 3-1.

His coaching career extended until 1917, during which time he developed numerous players, including Hobey Baker, for the Eastern colleges. It was such former players who provided the financial backing for the St. Nicholas Rink. Gordon was head of the history department at St. Paul's and in addition to hockey, also coached football and cricket as well.

After World War I service he was in the real estate business until 1927, when he founded the Malcolm K. Gordon School at Garrison, New York. He retired as headmaster in 1952, succeeded by his son David. Gordon continued to teach history at the school until 1963. He died the following year in Garrison, New York, at age 96.

In 1973, he was inducted in the first class (1973) to the United States Hockey Hall of Fame.
