= Benjamin Henry Paddock =

American bishop

The Right Reverend Benjamin Henry Paddock S.T.D.
- Bishop of Massachusetts
- Church: Episcopal Church
- Diocese: Massachusetts
- In office: 1873–1891
- Predecessor: Manton Eastburn
- Successor: Phillips Brooks

Orders
- Ordination: September 27, 1853 by John Williams
- Consecration: September 17, 1873 by Benjamin B. Smith

Personal details
- Born: February 29, 1828 Norwich, Connecticut, United States
- Died: March 9, 1891 (aged 63) Boston, Massachusetts, United States
- Buried: Yantic Cemetery, Norwich, Connecticut
- Denomination: Anglican
- Parents: Seth Birdsey Paddock & Emily Flagg
- Spouse: Caroline Hall Cooke; Anna Louise Sanger
- Children: 4

Benjamin Henry Paddock (February 29, 1828 – March 9, 1891) was the fifth Bishop of Massachusetts in the Episcopal Church.

== Biography ==
Paddock was born on February 29, 1828, in Norwich, Connecticut, the son of the Reverend Seth Birdsey Paddock who was rector of Trinity Church in Norwich, and Emily Flagg, and brother of John Adams Paddock. He studied at Trinity College and graduated in 1848. After graduation, he served as a teacher at the Episcopal Academy of Connecticut for one year. He then enrolled at the General Theological Seminary and graduated with a Bachelor of Divinity in 1852.

Paddock was ordained deacon on June 29, 1852 by Bishop Thomas Church Brownell of Connecticut in Christ Church, Stamford, Connecticut, and priest on September 27, 1853 by John Williams in Trinity Church, Norwich, Connecticut. Initially, he served as assistant minister at the Church of the Epiphany in New York City. In 1853 he became rector of St Luke’s Church in Portland, Maine. However, after three months he resigned and returned to Norwich, Connecticut, to serve as rector of Trinity Church. In 1860, he became rector of Christ Church Detroit, and in 1869 became rector of Grace Church in Brooklyn, New York City.

In 1873, Paddock was elected Bishop of Massachusetts and was consecrated on September 17, 1873 by Presiding Bishop Benjamin B. Smith. He retained the post till his death in 1891.

== See also ==
- List of bishops of the Episcopal Church in the United States of America
