= John A. Paddock =

American bishop

The Right Reverend John A. Paddock
- Missionary Bishop of Olympia
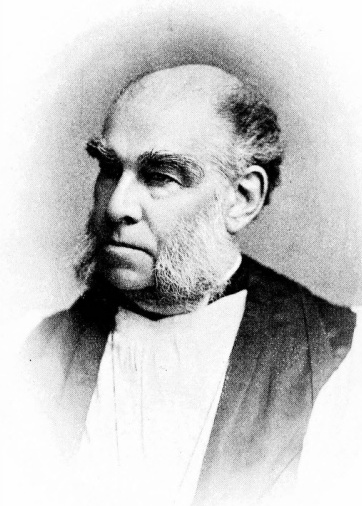
- Church: Episcopal Church
- See: Olympia
- Elected: October 26, 1880
- In office: 1880–1894
- Predecessor: Benjamin Wistar Morris
- Successor: William Morris Barker

Orders
- Ordination: July 22, 1849 (deacon); April 30, 1850 (priest) by Thomas Church Brownell
- Consecration: December 15, 1880 by Benjamin B. Smith

Personal details
- Born: January 19, 1825 Norwich, Connecticut, United States
- Died: March 4, 1894 (aged 69) Miramar, California, United States
- Buried: Tacoma Cemetery, Tacoma, Washington
- Denomination: Anglican
- Parents: Seth B. Paddock & Emily Flagg
- Spouse: Ellen M.Jones (m. 1850; died 1853) Frances Chester Fanning (m. 1856; died 1881)
- Children: 8

John Adams Paddock (January 19, 1825 – March 4, 1894) was the first missionary bishop of the Episcopal Diocese of Olympia, serving from 1880 to 1894.

== Early life and education ==
John A. Paddock was born in Norwich, Connecticut, on January 19, 1825, the son of the Reverend Seth Birdsey Paddock and Emily Flagg, and brother of Benjamin Henry Paddock who later became Bishop of Massachusetts. He studied at Trinity College, Hartford graduating in 1845, and in 1849 graduated from the General Theological Seminary in New York.

== Ordained Ministry ==
On July 22, 1849, Paddock was ordained deacon at St Peter's Church, Norwich, Connecticut, by Bishop Thomas Church Brownell of Connecticut. He then briefly served as assistant at the Church of the Epiphany in New York City. On April 30, 1850, he was ordained priest at Christ Church, Stratford, Connecticut, by Bishop Brownell, of which church he also served as rector until 1855. Later he became rector of St Peter's Church in Brooklyn where he remained until 1880.

== Bishop ==
On October 26, 1880, Paddock was elected Missionary Bishop of the territory of what became Washington state. He was consecrated bishop on December 1, 1880, in St Peter's Church with Presiding Bishop Benjamin B. Smith as principal consecrator. In 1892 the territory was divided into two districts, Olympia and Spokane, of which he retained charge of the former.

He died in office on March 4, 1894, in Miramar, California, while on a health retreat.

== Marriage ==
Paddock married Frances Chester Fanning on April 23, 1856. Fanning became ill while traveling, and died on April 29, 1881. In 1882, Paddock founded the Fannie C. Paddock Memorial Hospital.
