= Vincent Waydell Warner Jr. =

American priest (1940–2024)

The Right Reverend Vincent Waydell Warner
- Bishop of Olympia
- Church: Episcopal Church
- Diocese: Diocese of Olympia
- Elected: February 11, 1989
- In office: 1990-2007
- Predecessor: Robert H. Cochrane
- Successor: Gregory Rickel

Orders
- Ordination: June 4, 1971 (deacon); December 1, 1971 (priest) by William H. Marmion
- Consecration: July 8, 1989 by Robert H. Cochrane

Personal details
- Born: December 27, 1940 Roanoke, Virginia, U.S.
- Died: June 9, 2024 (aged 83)
- Denomination: Anglican
- Spouse: Janice (m. 1962) Shen (m. 2004)
- Children: 3

Vincent Waydell Warner Jr. (December 27, 1940 – June 9, 2024) was an American Episcopalian bishop. He was bishop of the Episcopal Diocese of Olympia from 1990 to 2007.

== Early life ==
Warner was born in Roanoke, Virginia, in 1940 son of Vincent and Virginia Warner. He studied at Virginia Theological Seminary and graduated in 1971 with a Master of Divinity. In 1962 he married Janice and together had three children.

He was ordained deacon on June 4, 1971, and priest on December 1, 1971, by Bishop William H. Marmion of Southern Virginia. In 1971 he initially became assistant priest at St John's Church in Roanoke, Virginia, and then in 1974 as assistant priest at Christ Church Chapel in Grosse Pointe Farms, Michigan, until 1976. He served as rector of St Peter's Church in Osterville, Massachusetts, from 1976 until 1980. In 1980 he became Archdeacon in the Diocese of Maine, and then between 1983 and 1989 he was rector of St Andrew's Church in Wellesley, Massachusetts.

== Episcopacy ==
On February 11, 1989, Warner was elected coadjutor bishop of Olympia on the first ballot during a special convention held at St. Mark's Cathedral. He was then consecrated on July 8, 1989 at the Climate Center Arena by Bishop Robert H. Cochrane of Olympia. He succeeded as diocesan bishop on January 1, 1990 and was enthroned on May 19, 1990. During his episcopacy he worked to champion gay rights in both church and state.

In 2003, Warner received the Bishop's Award of the National Episcopal Historians and Archivists. He announced his retirement in 2005 and retired on September 16, 2007.

== Suspension ==
In 2011, Katharine Jefferts Schori, the Presiding Bishop, restricted Warner from the exercise of his ministry during an investigation into a "credible allegation of recurrent marital infidelity." In 2012, the House of Bishops issued an accord for Warner "to not act as a bishop effective February 14, 2012."

== Later life and death ==
Warner and his wife remained married. He died at home on June 9, 2024, at the age of 83.
