= Sound Healing Symphony =

Sound bath concert series founded in San Francisco

The Sound Healing Symphony is a sound bath concert series founded in San Francisco, California, by Guy Douglas and Simona Marie Asinovski of Sound Meditation Presents. It was first held in 2016 at Grace Cathedral and has since been presented in other cities.

== History ==
The series began in 2016 at San Francisco's Grace Cathedral. It has subsequently been held at venues in other cities, including St. Bartholomew's Church in New York City, the Portland Art Museum, the San Diego Air & Space Museum and St. Mark's Cathedral in Seattle. SFGATE and other outlets noted that the events gathered over 1,000 people.

During events, participants lay down on yoga mats and blankets and engage in meditation. Led by Guy Douglas, musicians play on instruments including gongs, crystal singing bowls, harp, cello, didgeridoo, monochord, vibraphone, Native American flute, Tibetan bowls and chimes.

== See also ==
- List of music festivals in the United States
