= Simeon Arthur Huston =

American bishop (1876–1953)

The Right Reverend S. Arthur Huston
- Bishop of Olympia
- Church: Episcopal Church
- Diocese: Olympia
- Elected: February 3, 1925
- In office: 1925–1947
- Predecessor: Frederick W. Keator
- Successor: Stephen F. Bayne Jr.

Orders
- Ordination: June 28, 1903 (deacon); June 19, 1904(priest) by Boyd Vincent
- Consecration: May 15, 1925 by George Herbert Kinsolving

Personal details
- Born: December 10, 1876 Cincinnati, Ohio, United States
- Died: December 11, 1963 (aged 87) Bainbridge Island, Washington, United States
- Buried: Lake View Cemetery (Seattle)
- Denomination: Anglican
- Parents: Simeon Atchley Huston & Matilda Bogen
- Spouse: Dorothea J. Brotherton (m. 1911)
- Children: 4

Simeon Arthur Huston (called Arthur; December 10, 1876 – December 11, 1963) was the bishop of the Episcopal Diocese of Olympia from 1925 to 1947. During his episcopate bankers foreclosed on the cathedral church of the diocese, but he led a successful effort to pay off the indebtedness.

== Early life and education ==
Bishop Huston was born in Cincinnati, Ohio, the younger son of Simeon Atchley Huston (1845 – 1883) and the former Matilda Bogen (1848 – 1927). His mother was a daughter of Peter Bogen, a prominent pork-packer in Cincinnati, and a younger sister of Louise Bogen, the wife of General Godfrey Weitzel. His father was a partner in the Bogen pork-packing firm; after his father's early death, his mother became postmaster of the Cincinnati suburb of Hartwell.

In 1900 Huston received a B.A. degree and membership in Phi Beta Kappa society from Kenyon College in Gambier, Ohio. Remaining in Gambier, he next attended Bexley Theological Seminary from which he graduated in 1903.

== Priest ==
Ordained a deacon on June 28, 1903 and a priest on June 19, 1904 by Coadjutor Bishop Boyd Vincent of Southern Ohio, Huston served as curate at Trinity Church in Columbus, Ohio, from 1903 to 1907 and at St. Paul's Cathedral in Detroit, Michigan, from 1907 to 1913.

From 1913 to 1919 Huston was rector of St. Mark's Church in Cheyenne, Wyoming, where he also served as president of the Wyoming State Board of Education from 1917 to 1919. In 1919 he was called to Christ Church in Baltimore, Maryland, and while in Baltimore, he studied at Johns Hopkins University in 1920 and 1921. Between 1921 and 1925 he was rector of St. Mark's Church in San Antonio, Texas.

== Episcopacy ==
On February 3, 1925, Huston was elected bishop of Olympia and was consecrated on May 15. His consecrators were:

- The Right Reverend George H. Kinsolving, Bishop of Texas
- The Right Reverend William T. Capers, Bishop of West Texas
- The Right Reverend William Bertrand Stevens, Bishop of Los Angeles

In 1926 plans were drawn up for building St. Mark's Cathedral in Seattle, Washington, and construction commenced in 1928. However, the Great Depression that began in 1929 caused pledges to dry up, and at the time of the cathedral's dedication on April 25, 1931, the congregation still owed $250,000 to the Mercantile-Commerce Bank & Trust Co. of St. Louis, which had provided the financing. In May 1940 the bank foreclosed and began charging rent of $500 per month. A year later, the rent not having been paid, the bank took possession of the cathedral.

In 1934, he went to civil court to remove the rector of Trinity Parish Church, without having gotten the approval of the Standing Committee of the diocese.

In 1944 Bishop Huston traveled to St. Louis to negotiate with the bankers. Between 1944 and 1947 fundraising, including a 1945 Civic Banquet, hosted by Emil Sick and Dave Beck, that netted $85,000, led to all indebtedness being paid off. On March 30, 1947, Palm Sunday, the mortgage was "burned" before the altar; the St. Louis bankers had contributed the last $5,000 of the debt.

In June 1947 Bishop Huston retired to Winslow on Bainbridge Island. He died on December 11, 193 and is buried at Lake View Cemetery in Seattle.

== Recognition ==
Bishop Huston was the recipient of two honorary degrees, a D.D. degree from Kenyon College in 1925 and an LL.D. from the College of Puget Sound in 1931. The Huston Camp and Conference Center in Gold Bar, Washington was named for him.

== Family ==
On October 4, 1911, Bishop Huston had married Dorothea Josephine Brotherton (1885 – 1968) of Detroit. Her father was Wilber Brotherton (1858 – 1949), the manager of Detroit operations for the Jerome B. Rice Seed Company, and her mother was Belle Brotherton (1857 – 1934), a leader in the women's suffrage movement. Bishop Huston and his wife were the parents of four children, three of whom survived to adulthood. Their first child was Wilber B. Huston, who won the 1929 Edison scholarship contest and went on to have a long career with NASA.

Episcopal Church (USA) titles
| Preceded by Frederic W. Keator | 2nd Bishop of Olympia; 1925 – 1947 | Succeeded by Stephen F. Bayne, Jr. |
