= William Morris Barker =

American bishop (1854–1901)

The Right Reverend William Morris Barker
- Missionary Bishop of Olympia
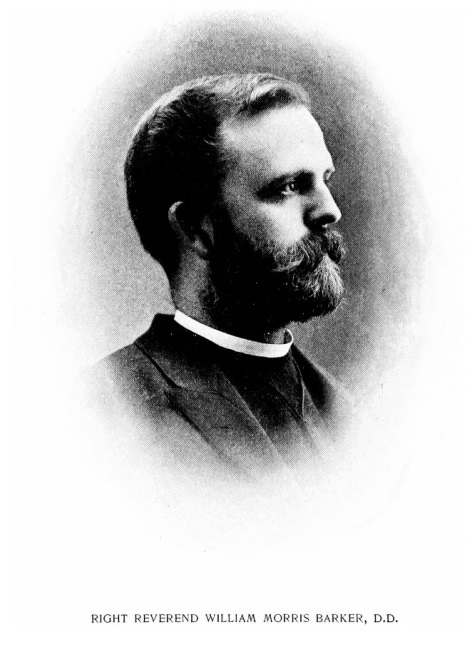
- Church: Episcopal Church
- See: Olympia
- Elected: October 22, 1892
- In office: 1894–1901
- Predecessor: John A. Paddock
- Successor: Frederick W. Keator
- Other post: Missionary Bishop of Western Colorado (1893–1894)

Orders
- Ordination: February 15, 1880 (priest) by William Croswell Doane
- Consecration: October 22, 1892 by Benjamin Wistar Morris

Personal details
- Born: May 12, 1854 Towanda, Pennsylvania, United States
- Died: February 21, 1901 (aged 46) Tacoma, Washington, United States
- Buried: Tacoma Cemetery, Tacoma, Washington
- Denomination: Anglican
- Parents: George R. Barker & Anna E. Morris
- Spouse: Laura Pindell Adair (m. 1892)

William Morris Barker (May 12, 1854 – February 21, 1901) was bishop of the Episcopal Diocese of Olympia from 1894 to 1901. He also served as bishop of the former Episcopal Diocese of Western Colorado from 1893 to 1894.

== Early life and education ==
Barker was born on May 12, 1854, in Towanda, Pennsylvania, to George R. Barker and Anna Ellis Morris. He was educated at the University of Pennsylvania, graduating in 1873, and Berkeley Divinity School, graduating in 1876. He then taught at Bishop Scott Grammar School in Portland, Oregon, until 1879.

== Ordained ministry ==
Barker was ordained deacon on June 14, 1879, in Holy Trinity Church, Middletown, Connecticut, by Bishop John Williams of Connecticut, and then priest on February 15, 1880, by Bishop William Croswell Doane of Albany. He then served as curate at St. John's Church in Troy, New York, from 1879 until 1880 when he moved to Washington, D.C., to become curate at St John's Parish, Lafayette Square. That same year, he left St. John's to become rector of St. Paul's Parish, K Street. He remained there until 1887 when he accepted the rectorship of St. Luke's Church in Baltimore. In 1889 he became President of St. Luke's Hospital in Duluth, Minnesota, and was in charge of St Paul's Church in the same city. His honorary degree of D.D. was conferred by the Seabury Divinity School in 1892.

== Episcopacy ==
William Morris Barker was elected by the House of Bishops as Missionary Bishop of Western Colorado on October 22, 1892, and consecrated on January 25, 1893, at St Paul's Church in Duluth, Minnesota. In 1894 he was elected as Missionary Bishop of Olympia to succeed Bishop John A. Paddock, where he remained until his death in Tacoma, Washington, February 21, 1901.
