= Peter Hallock =

Peter Rasmussen Hallock (November 19, 1924, Kent, Washington – April 27, 2014, Fall City, Washington) was an American organist, choirmaster, liturgist, countertenor, and composer and arranger of church music (anthems, hymns, psalm settings, and music for the Episcopal liturgy). Though he occasionally gave concerts, lectures, and seminars around the United States, his career was centered in Seattle, Washington. From 1951 to 1991 he served as organist and choirmaster at St. Mark's Cathedral, Seattle, during which he was conferred the title of Canon Precentor, the first layperson in the Episcopal Church (United States) to be so honored. Later, he served as organist at St. Clements (Seattle) until 2013. He also founded the Compline Choir from its predecessor chant study group in 1956; he led the choir until 2009. He never married.

== Biography ==
After WWII, when he was discharged from the Army, Hallock pursued organ studies at the University of Washington, and also studied at the Royal School of Church Music. In 1986, with Carl Crosier, he founded Ionian Arts, a music publishing business.

== Selected Compositions ==
- Psalms 134 & 4
- Psalm 23
- Psalm 91
- Psalm 139
- Bring Us, O Lord God
- Draw On Sweet Night
- Easter Canticle
- If We Could Shut the Gate
- Ionian Psalter
- Lamentations of Jeremiah 1: 1-2
- The Lord Is My Light
- Peace
- Phoenix
- To the Supreme Being
- Ye Choirs of New Jerusalem
