= Gregory Rickel =

American Episcopal bishop (born 1963)

The Right Reverend Gregory Rickel
- Bishop of Olympia
- Church: Episcopal Church
- Diocese: Diocese of Olympia
- Elected: May 12, 2007
- In office: 2007–2022
- Predecessor: Vincent Warner
- Successor: Melissa M. Skelton (provisional); Philip N. LaBelle (diocesan)
- Other post: Assisting Bishop of Southeast Florida (2023-present)

Orders
- Ordination: July 8, 1996 (deacon); January 18, 1997 (priest) by Larry Maze
- Consecration: September 15, 2007 by Richard Sui On Chang

Personal details
- Born: June 27, 1963 (age 63) Omaha, Nebraska, United States
- Denomination: Anglican
- Spouse: Martha R. Rickel (m. 1984)
- Children: 1

Gregory Harold Rickel (born June 27, 1963) is an American Episcopal bishop. From 2007 to 2022, he was the eighth bishop of the Episcopal Diocese of Olympia.

== Early life and education ==
Rickel was born in Omaha, Nebraska on June 27, 1963 to Morris and Linda Rickel. He studied a he University of Arkansas and graduated with a Bachelor of Arts in 1984 and a Master of Arts in 1987 and another in 1993. He also earned a Master of Divinity from the Seminary of the Southwest in 1996. He was awarded with a Doctor of Ministry from the University of the South in 2002 and an honorary Doctor of Divinity from the Seminary of the Southwest in 2007.

== Ordained Ministry ==
He was ordained a deacon on July 8, 1996 and priest on January 18, 1997 by Bishop Larry Maze of Arkansas. He served at St Peter's Church in Conway, Arkansas from 1996 to 2001 and then as rector of St James' Church in Austin, Texas from 2001 until 2007.

== Episcopacy ==
Rickel was elected Bishop of Olympia on May 12, 2007 and was consecrated on September 15, 2007. He announced his intent to resign the episcopate effective December 31, 2022.

On April 4, 2023, he was installed as assisting bishop of the Episcopal Diocese of Southeast Florida.

== See also ==
- List of Episcopal bishops of the United States
- Historical list of the Episcopal bishops of the United States

Episcopal Church (USA) titles
Preceded by Vincent Warner	8th Bishop of Olympia; 2007–2022	Succeeded by Philip N. LaBelle
