= Episcopal Church of the Advent (Cynthiana, Kentucky) =

Historic church in Kentucky, United States

- Church of the Advent, Episcopal
- U.S. National Register of Historic Places
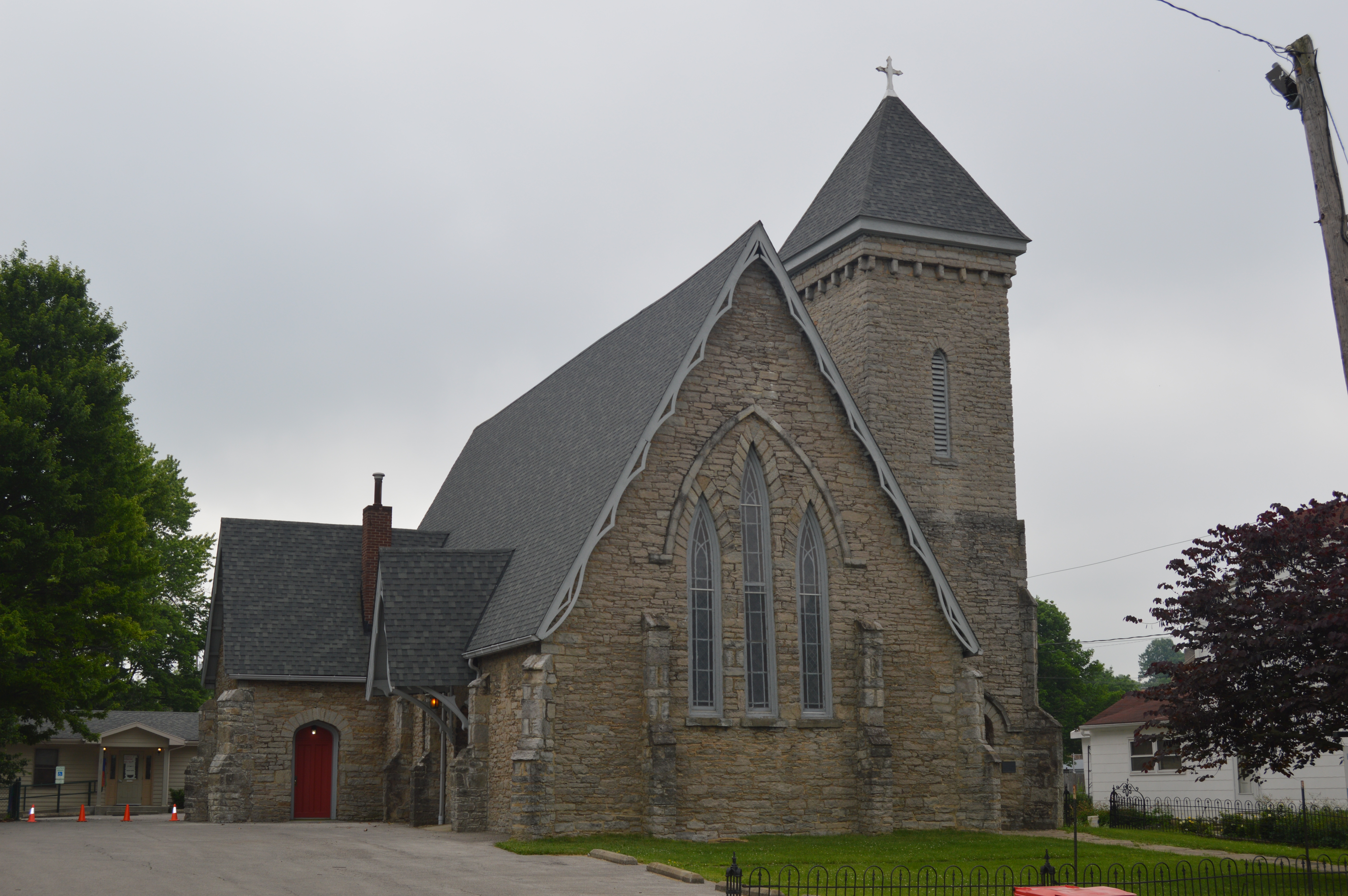
- Front and northern side

- Location within Kentucky Location within the United States
- Location: 118 N. Walnut St., Cynthiana, Kentucky
- Coordinates: 38°23′29″N 84°17′58″W
- Area: 0.5 acres (0.20 ha)
- Built: 1855, 1860
- Architect: Bishop Benjamin Bosworth Smith
- Architectural style: Gothic Revival
- NRHP reference No.: 78001339
- Added to NRHP: December 22, 1978

The Church of the Advent, Episcopal in Cynthiana, Kentucky is a historic church at 118 N. Walnut Street. It was built in 1855 and added to the National Register in 1978.

It was deemed "architecturally significant as a fine adaptation of the Gothic Revival-a style traditionally deemed appropriate for churches of the Anglican Communion. Its seating capacity of eighty-five is symbolic of the religious fervor and optimism of the parish,-which recorded only eleven communicants and thirty-five Sunday School pupils at the time the cornerstone was laid. The building also attains merit through its association with the Right Reverend Benjamin Bosworth Smith, a pioneer Kentucky clergyman and educator."

Its square tower was completed in 1860. It is built of limestone and has a Latin cross plan.

The church's website can be found at https://churchoftheadvent.us.
