= Henry F. Starbuck =

Henry F. Starbuck (1850–1935) was an American architect and a specialist in church architecture.

== Biography ==
=== Early life and ancestors ===
Henry Fletcher Starbuck was born on March 1, 1850, in Nantucket, Massachusetts, and died on August 21, 1935, at Decoto, Alameda County, California. He was the son of Henry Starbuck and Abigail Borden. His father came to America as a cabin boy on a whaling ship from the Azores and later became a whaling captain, skippering the ships Franklin and Daniel Webster.

=== Education ===
He completed his education in Boston and fulfilled his apprenticeship there under Harvard-educated architect Abel C. Martin (1831–1879). Following his apprenticeship, he formed a partnership in Boston with George A. Moore as Moore & Starbuck in 1873, followed by a partnership with Arthur H. Vinal as Starbuck & Vinal in 1877. Leaving Boston, he relocated to New Brunswick for a short while and from there he spent several years in Chicago, Illinois, and was briefly in Milwaukee, Wisconsin. By 1894 he had established a practice in San Diego, California, where he earned a reputation as a specialist in church architecture.

After working on a church building in Fresno in 1902, he relocated to Oakland, California, where he built a flourishing practice. While practicing in Oakland, Starbuck formed a brief partnership with William Wilde which ended after a couple of years. After his well-publicized divorce he resettled in Fresno, California, to rebuild his career and life in 1910. He retired at Decoto, now Union City, California.

=== Marriage and family ===
He married as his first wife, on August 10, 1872, at Abington, Plymouth County, Massachusetts, Charlotte Elizabeth Noyes, born on August 10, 1850, at Abington, Massachusetts, the daughter of Lewis Ellingwood Noyes and Lucy A. Briggs. She was an 1870 graduate of Mount Holyoke College and was a school teacher before her marriage in 1872. She was a descendant of Dr. Samuel Fuller, a passenger on the Mayflower and one of the Separatist settlers of the Plymouth Colony in Massachusetts. They were the parents of a son, Henry Walker Starbuck (1874–1948). This couple later divorced.

Henry married Minnie Idella Stickle on 27 February 1896 in Los Angeles County, California. She was his second wife. Minnie was born about 1866 in Illinois, the daughter of John Stickle and Mary Ann (Kizer) Stickle. She and Henry were living together in Long Beach, Los Angeles County, California when the census was taken in 1900. Minnie died on 10 March 1901 in Macon County, Illinois.

He married, in 1901 in Los Angeles, California, as his third wife, Mrs. Margaret (Mabee) Lee, age 39, born March 16, 1862, in Michigan of Canadian parentage, and whose first husband was from New York, and whose daughter, Chrystal Rose Lee, was born on February 9, 1889. She was the daughter of George Mabee and Lydia (Burgess) Mabe. She died on August 15, 1936, in Long Beach, California. She was implicated but was never charged in a triple murder that occurred in July 1910 on their property, The Margaret Starbuck Ranch, now known as Lions Head Ranch in Cazadero, California. This led to their separation in 1911 and divorce in 1914.

He married as his fourth wife, in about 1915, Katherine Sophia Graham, born February 27, 1871, at San Francisco, California, and died on September 18, 1940, at Decoto, Alameda County, California. She was the daughter of John Richard Graham and Elizabeth Gardner. There were no children from this marriage.

=== Works ===
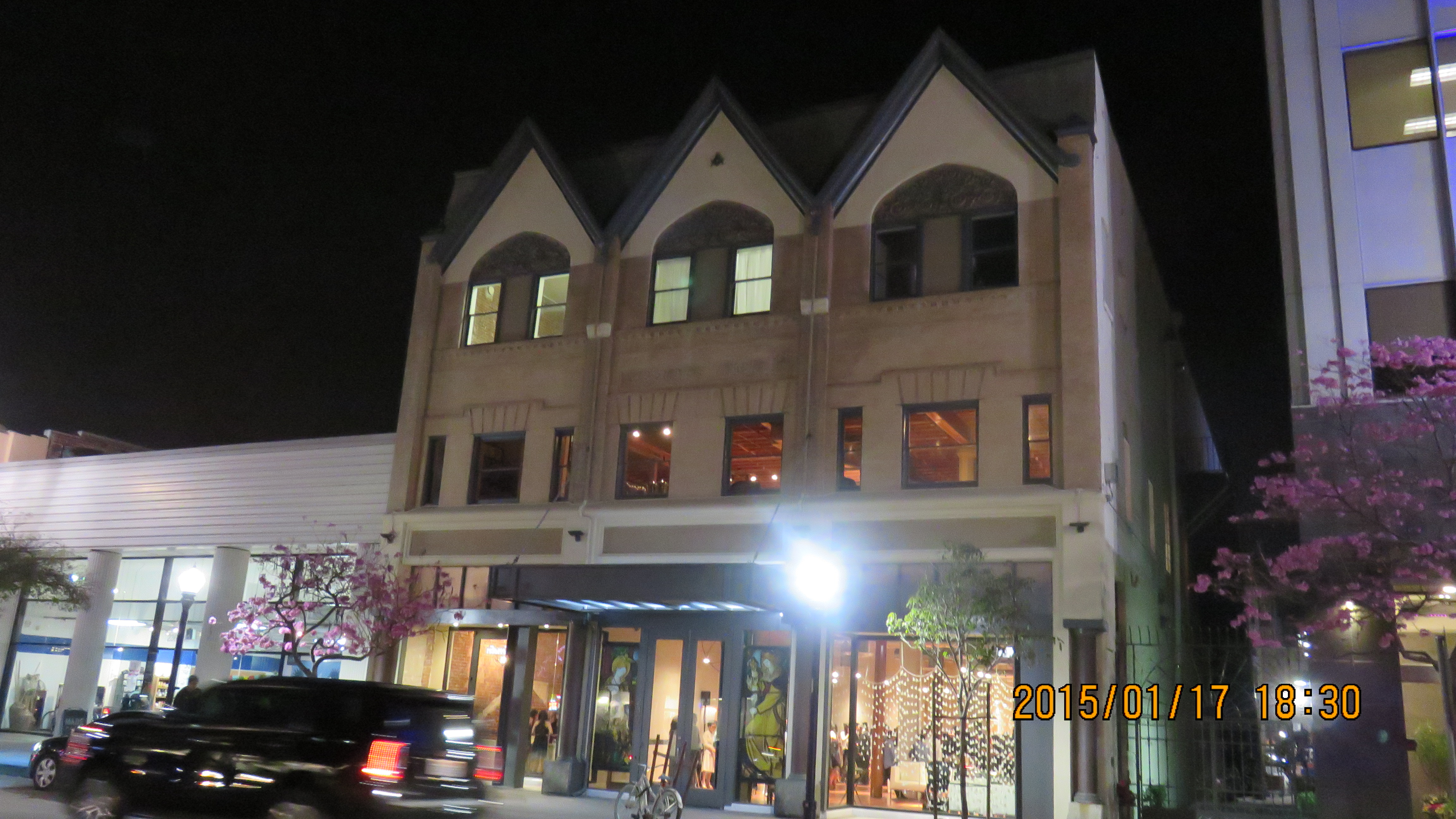
The Masonic Temple in Long Beach, California is one of his last surviving works

- 1st Baptist Church, Oxnard, CA - 1928
- 1st Methodist Episcopal Church of Los Angeles #1, Downtown, Los Angeles, CA
- Bank of New Brunswick
- Boston Ranch Church, El Cajon, CA
- California Sanitarium (Long Beach, CA)
- First Congregational Church, Fresno, California
- Free Evangelical Lutheran Cross Church, Fresno - 1914
- Fresno Church - 1912
- Fresno County Almshouse Project, Fresno - 1906
- Giffen House
- Knox Presbyterian Church, Berkeley, California
- Masonic Lodge Project, Palo Alto, CA - c. 1905
- Masonic Lodge Project, Santa Rosa, CA - 1905
- Masonic Temple (Long Beach, California)
- Methodist Church at Farmington, Maine
- Quinn Chapel AME Church (Chicago, Illinois)
- Olivet Congregational Church, United Church of Christ, Olivet, Michigan
- St. John's Episcopal Church, Decatur, Illinois
- Trinity Episcopal Church (Michigan City, IN)
- Trinity Episcopal Parish Church (Seattle)
- Vallejo Bible Church (formerly 1st Presbyterian), Vallejo, California (1919)

=== Publications ===
- Boston Ranch Church, Builder & Contractor, 1, col 5, 1/16/1895.
- First Methodist Episcopal Church, Los Angeles, notice, Builder & Contractor, 1, col 4, 3/23/1898.
- Knox Presbyterian Church plans, Builder & Contractor, 1, col 3, 3/30/1898.
- Plans for the First Baptist Church, Oxnard notice, Southwest Builder & Contractor, 53, col 2, 4/13/1928.
- Fresno church alterations, Southwest Contractor and Manufacturer, 23, col 2, 5/11/1912.
- Free Evangelical Lutheran Cross Church notice, Southwest Contractor and Manufacturer, 25, col 1, 5/23/1914.
- Ochsner, Jeffrey Karl, and Andersen, Dennis A., Distant Corner: Seattle Architects and the Legacy of H. H. Richardson (University of Washington Press, 2003), pp. 239, 240 (Trinity Church, Seattle; identifies Henry Starbuck as a "Chicago architect")
