= Compline Choir =

US choral group

- Website: complinechoir.org

The Compline Choir is an American choral group that chants the Office of Compline every Sunday night, 9:30 P.M. Pacific time, at St. Mark's Cathedral in Seattle, Washington. The Office of Compline is made up of sacred music including plainsong and polyphonic compositions, and chanted recitations of the Apostles' Creed and the Lord’s Prayer.

== Order of Compline ==
The Order of Compline consists of short passages from scripture (chapters), psalms, an office hymn, a canticle (Nunc dimittis), a litany, collects and additional prayers. The liturgy, as sung by the Compline Choir, is based on An Order for Compline, found as an appendix to the 1928 Proposed Book of Common Prayer.

== Repertoire ==
The repertory of Compline Choir can be found in the online listing of weekly music presented. Generally (in addition to the standard liturgy) each week includes singing a new or different setting of the following: a psalm, a hymn, a Nunc dimittis, and an anthem.

== Members ==
As of 2025, all members of the choir are male volunteers. There is a women's choir who has occasionally performed since 2019, usually in cases when the men's choir is touring. The singers are expected to perform at 44 Sundays each year.

== Recordings and performances ==
Archived recordings of Sunday evening services can be heard in podcast format. The radio station KING-FM broadcasts the service each week. The Compline Choir also has made several recordings.

- What Hand Divine (2015)
- I Will Meditate (2013)
- Carols Old and New (2006)
- Night Music (2001)
- Feathers of Green Gold: The Office of Compline and Ten Psalms (1994)

== History ==
The Compline Choir was formed in 1954 or 1955, when Peter Hallock invited "a dozen University of Washington music students" to form "a study group to sing plainsong". At its founding, it is thought to have been the only American choir to regularly sing compline outside of a monastery. They began their radio broadcasts around 1962. The choir was largely ignored for its first decade, but exploded in popularity among young Seattle residents beginning in 1967.

The choir was directed by Peter Hallock for many years prior to his retirement in 2009. Dr. Jason Anderson (a Compline Choir member since 2004) became the second director of the Compline Choir. The Composer-in-Residence (since 2011) is Derek Curtis-Tilton.

In March 2020, the choir's performances were closed to the public due to the COVID-19 pandemic, although the performances continued to be broadcast weekly for the next 16 months. Singers took various precautions, including masking, distancing, and performing in quartets rather than the full choir. The performances reopened to the public in August 2021.

The success of the choir has inspired other compline choirs in the U.S.
