= Quinn Chapel AME Church (Chicago) =

Historic church in Illinois, United States

- Quinn Chapel of the A.M.E. Church
- U.S. National Register of Historic Places
- Chicago Landmark
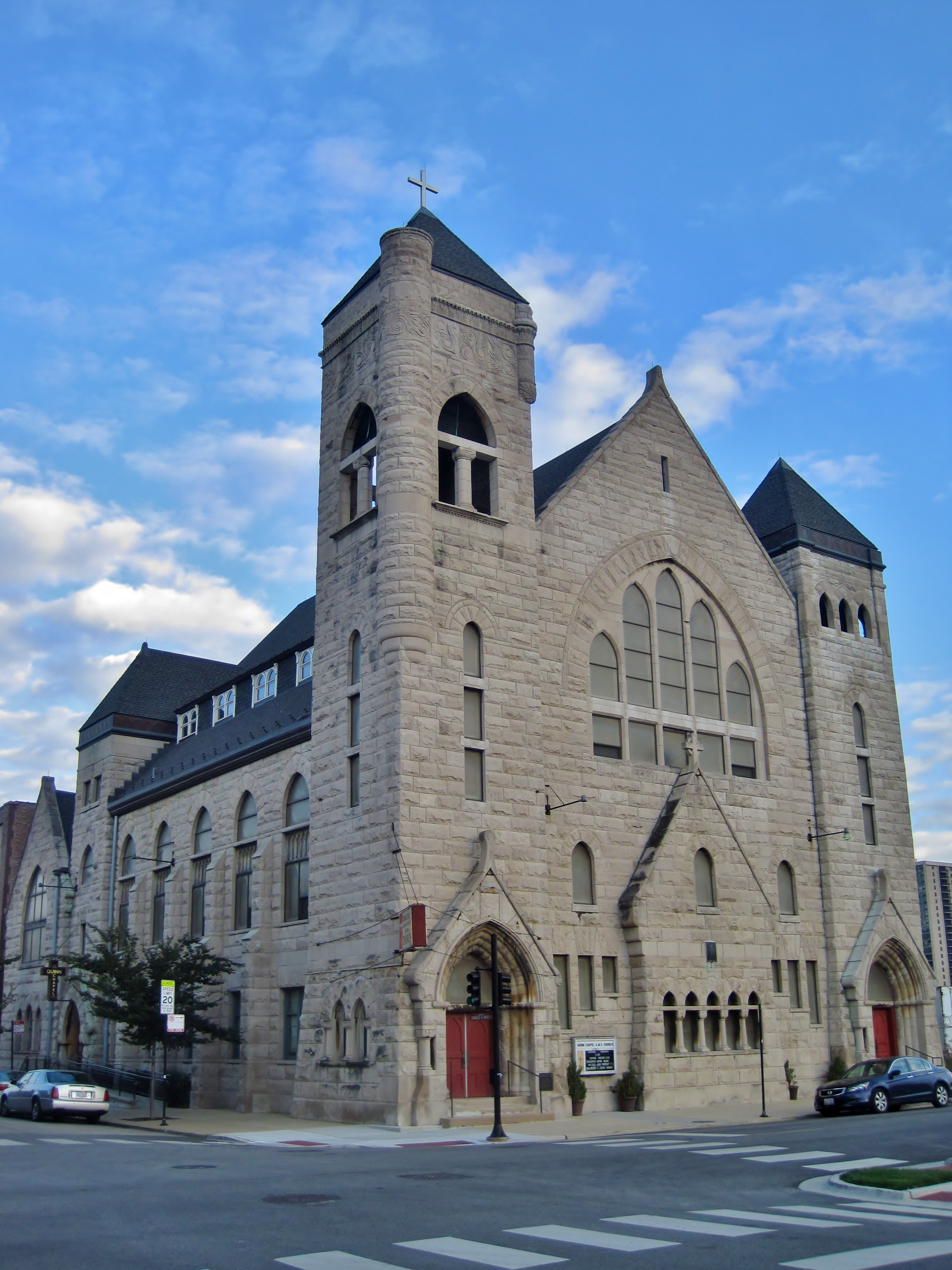
- Quinn Chapel AME Church
- Location: 2401 S. Wabash Ave., Chicago, Illinois
- Coordinates: 41°50′56″N 87°37′30″W
- Built: 1891
- Architect: Henry F. Starbuck
- Architectural style: Romanesque Revival
- NRHP reference No.: 79000827

Significant dates
- Added to NRHP: September 4, 1979
- Designated CHICL: August 13, 1977

Quinn Chapel AME Church, also known as Quinn Chapel of the A.M.E. Church, houses Chicago's first African-American congregation, formed by seven individuals as a nondenominational prayer group that met in the house of a member in 1844. In 1847, the group organized as a congregation of the African Methodist Episcopal Church, the first independent black denomination in the United States. They named the church for Bishop William Paul Quinn.

In the years leading up to the Civil War, the church played an important role in the city's abolitionist movement. It was as a stop on the Underground Railroad, serving those escaping slavery from the Southern United States. Then located at the present site of the Monadnock Building in downtown Chicago, the 1871 Great Chicago Fire destroyed the original church. The congregation subsequently met for many years in temporary locations before purchasing the present site in 1890. The current structure, designed by architect Henry F. Starbuck and built in 1892 at 2401 South Wabash Avenue, reflects the area's late 19th-century character. The church was designated as a Chicago Landmark August 3, 1977, and was listed on the National Register of Historic Places September 4, 1979. Considered architecturally significant, the church is featured in such books as Chicago Churches: A Photographic Essay by Elizabeth Johnson (Uppercase Books Inc, 1999) as well as Chicago Churches and Synagogues: An Architectural Pilgrimage, by George A. Lane (Loyola Press 1982).

In 1992, Quinn Chapel joined with three other nearby churches to found The Renaissance Collaborative: a non-profit organization devoted to saving the historic Wabash YMCA and fulfilling the needs of the Bronzeville community.
