= Robert V. Taylor =

Robert V. Taylor (born c. 1958 in Cape Town, South Africa) is a priest in the Episcopal Church USA and an activist for social justice. He was installed in 1999 as dean of St. Mark's Episcopal Cathedral in Seattle, making him the first openly gay Episcopal dean in the United States and, at the time, the highest-ranking openly gay priest in the Episcopal Church.

As a young man in South Africa, Taylor was an anti-apartheid activist. His apartment was raided by government forces in 1980, and he was threatened with compulsory military service. Unwilling to support the apartheid regime, he sought counsel from Archbishop Desmond Tutu, who advised him to flee the country and pursue his priestly studies in America. Tutu assisted him and remained his friend and mentor thereafter.

He received his Master of Divinity degree from Union Theological Seminary in New York City in 1984, having previously earned a Bachelor of Arts at Rhodes University.

Taylor served as parish priest at St. Peter's Episcopal Church in Peekskill, New York, from 1989 to 1999, where he introduced significant outreach ministries including child care, services for the elderly, and HIV/AIDS ministers, and was credited with strengthening membership.

In 1999 he was elected Dean of the Episcopal Cathedral in Seattle making him the highest ranking openly gay clergy priest at the time. In Seattle, he co-founded "Faith Forward", an interfaith initiative on public policy, politics, and spirituality. He was an organizer of "Seeds of Compassion", which drew over 150,000 attendees to an interfaith series of events on compassion during which he hosted a dialog between the Dalai Lama and Desmond Tutu. He initiated a countywide response to homelessness, becoming the founding chair of the Committee to End Homelessness in King County, which has united 35 jurisdictions, foundations, social service agencies, corporate leaders, interfaith leaders, and others in a unified effort to end homelessness.

In 1999, shortly after his installation at St. Mark's, Taylor was asked by Archbishop Tutu to serve as the first president of the Desmond Tutu Peace Foundation USA.

In 2001, Taylor was named chair of the Committee to End Homelessness in King County, whose ten-year plan to end homelessness was adopted by the county in 2005.

In June 2005, U.S. Representative Jim McDermott nominated Taylor for Seattle Magazine's annual "Power 25", stating that Taylor "has inspired Faith Forward, a new way to address old ideas found in the Scriptures, like ending poverty, hunger, and war. At a time of intense division in our nation, Robert Taylor is preaching the gospel of unity, of accepting each another and vowing to heal, not hurt, one another."

In May 2006, Taylor was one of seven candidates for election as eighth bishop of the Episcopal Diocese of California. The nomination of Taylor and two other openly gay candidates led to speculation that the diocese, located in the San Francisco Bay Area, might choose to consecrate a second openly gay bishop in response to the controversy over the 2003 election of the Rt. Rev. V. Gene Robinson in New Hampshire. Instead, the diocese elected the Rt. Rev. Marc Handley Andrus.

In celebration of his installation as dean of the cathedral in Seattle, Dorothy Papadakos was commissioned to compose an anthem titled "Live in Love", published by Oxford University Press.

Taylor has published articles on the subject of interfaith dialogue and reconciliation, and in support of same-sex marriage, among many other issues.

On 27 March 2008, Taylor announced his resignation as dean of St. Mark's Episcopal Cathedral.

Taylor's book, A New Way to be Human: 7 Spiritual Pathways to Becoming Fully Alive, offers a path to an integrated life of purpose. It gives expression to the viewpoint that God, or the holy, existed before religion. It provides a spirituality of purpose for those who are spiritual but not religious, and celebrates a generous spirituality of love and compassion. The book was launched in Seattle, 17 April 2012.

Taylor is featured as a character in the play The Thin Place by Sonya Schneider and directed by Andrew Russell for its premiere at the Intiman Theater, May 2010.

== Photos ==
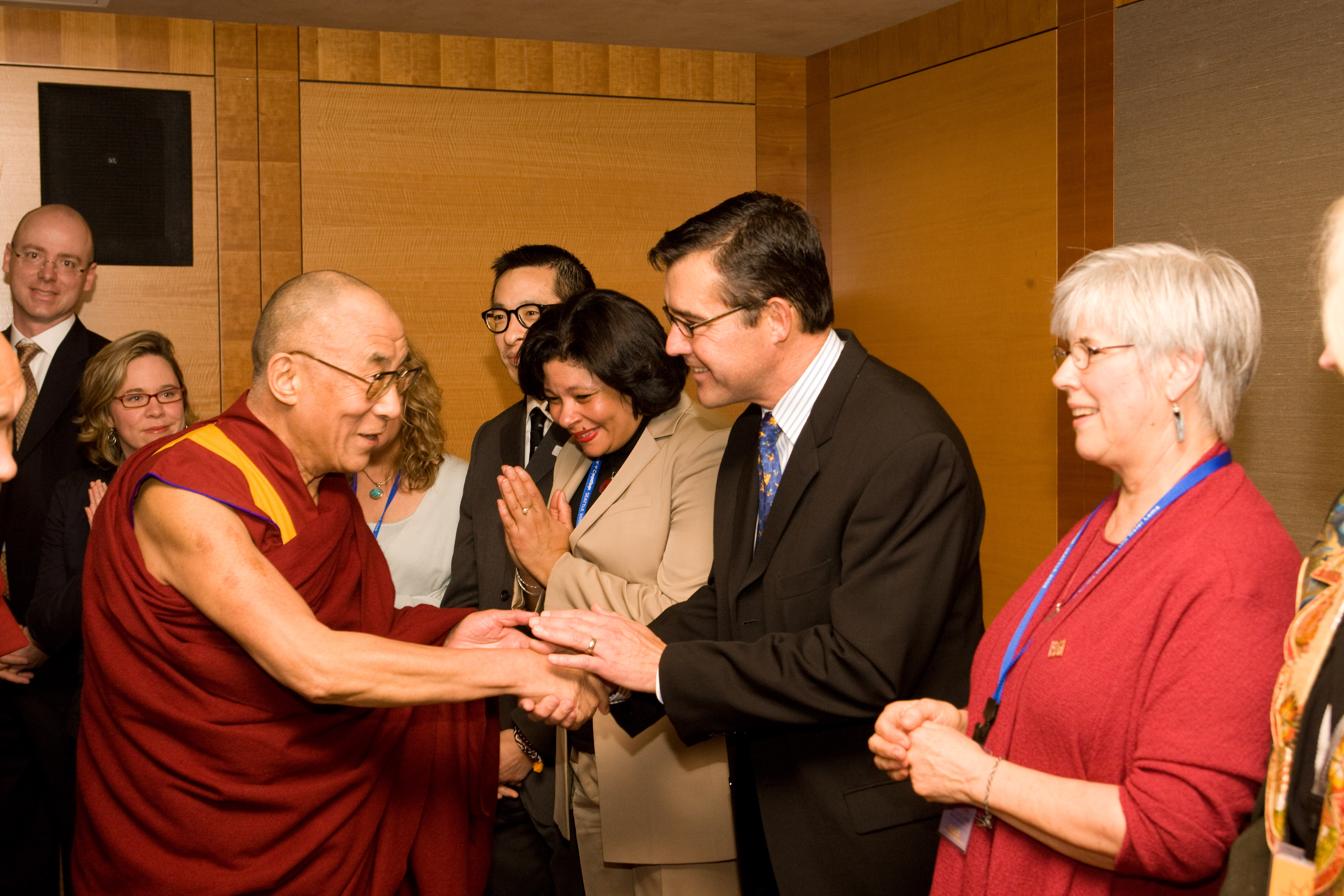
