= Frederick W. Keator =

Episcopical priest & third missionary bishop of Washington state

The Right Reverend Frederick W. Keator
- Bishop of Olympia
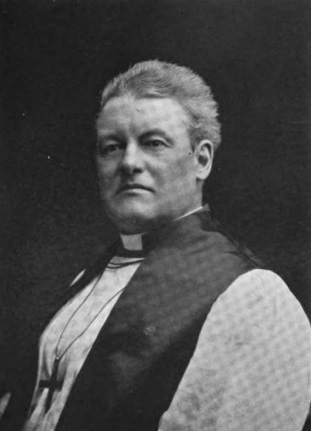
- Church: Episcopal Church
- Province: Province 8
- Diocese: Olympia
- Elected: 1901
- In office: 1902–1924
- Predecessor: William Morris Barker
- Successor: S. Arthur Huston

Orders
- Ordination: May 31, 1891 (deacon); 1891 (priest) by William Edward McLaren
- Consecration: January 8, 1902 by William Edward McLaren

Personal details
- Born: May 20, 1855 Honesdale, Pennsylvania, Pennsylvania, United States
- Died: January 31, 1924 (aged 68) New Haven, Connecticut, United States
- Buried: Tacoma Cemetery, Tacoma
- Denomination: Anglican
- Parents: Jerman S. Keator & Mary C. Baldwin
- Spouse: Emma Victoria Lyon (m. 1894)
- Children: Frederick Keator, Jr.
- Education: Yale University
- Alma mater: Yale Law School; Seabury-Western Theological Seminary

Frederick William Keator (October 22, 1855 – January 31, 1924) was an American lawyer who became an Episcopal priest and the third missionary bishop of Washington state, which encompassed that portion of Washington State west of the Cascade Range. It achieved full diocesan status (and a name change) during his tenure, so Rt.Rev. Keator became the first bishop of what became the Episcopal Diocese of Olympia.

== Early and family life ==
Born to Mary Chapman Baldwin Keator and her husband Jermann Samuel Keator on October 22, 1855, in Honesdale, the county seat and a railroad terminus in Wayne County, Pennsylvania, serving New York City and Pennsylvania's coal county. Young Keator moved to Moline, Illinois (another important railroad town) with his family by 1860.

He graduated from Yale University with a bachelor's degree in 1880 and two years later received an LLB. degree from Yale Law School. After admission to the Illinois bar, he practiced law in Chicago, Illinois. He later attended the Western Theological Seminary of Chicago, and graduated in 1891. He received a D.D. degree from Yale in 1895.

In 1896, when he was 39, Rev. Keator married 21 year old Emma Lyon in Chicago, and they would soon have a son, Frederic Keator Jr.

== Ministry ==
An Anglo-Catholic, Keating helped establish the Church of the Atonement in the developing Edgewater neighborhood of Chicago, which prompted him to leave his legal practice. After ordination both as a deacon and priest by bishop William Edward McLaren of Chicago in 1891, Rev. Keator served as the mission congregation's first priest-in-charge until 1896, shortly before it achieved full parish status. He then served congregations in Freeport, Illinois, until 1898, and at St. John's Church in Dubuque, Iowa, from 1899 to 1902. He was consecrated in the episcopacy on January 8, 1902, by Presiding Bishop William Hobart Hare (former missionary bishop of South Dakota), as well as by Chicago bishop McLaren, bishop Cyrus F. Knight of Milwaukee, and bishops Nicholson, White, Edsall, Morrison, A. Williams, Anderson and Taylor. Assigned to Washington, Rt. Rev. Keator reached his diocese on January 25 and soon established his residence in Tacoma. He served as the third Missionary Bishop of Washington State from 1902 until 1910, when the missionary district achieved full diocesan status (as well as a name change to distinguish it from not only the Episcopal Diocese of Spokane but also the diocese encompassing the national capital).

Among his various civic activities in Washington, Bishop Keator served as president of the Tacoma Public Library board from 1907 to 1910 and also 1912 to 1923. He also served on the boards of the Annie Wright Seminary, Whitman College in Walla Walla, and Tacoma General Hospital. Bishop Keator also served as the chaplain of the local Coast Guard Artillery Corps and the Washington State National Guard, and was a member of the Executive Council of the Episcopal Church (representing the Pacific region).

Rt. Rev. Keator became the first Bishop of Olympia upon its formation in 1910, and served until his death on January 31, 1924. The following year, Rev. Simeon Arthur Huston was elected to succeed him and was duly consecrated, and would move the diocesan seat to Seattle.

== Death and legacy ==
Bishop Keator died of a heart attack on January 31, 1924, in New Haven, Connecticut, while visiting his son, who had become an instructor in electrical engineering at Yale. He was also survived by his wife, and was buried in Tacoma cemetery in Tacoma, Washington.

His papers are held by the Tacoma Public Library in their special collections.

Episcopal Church (USA) titles
Preceded by William Morris Barker	3rd Missionary Bishop of Washington; 1902 – 1910	Succeeded by n/a

Episcopal Church (USA) titles
Preceded by n/a	1st Bishop of Olympia; 1910 – 1924	Succeeded by Arthur Huston
