= Ivol Curtis =

The Right Reverend Ivol Curtis
- Bishop of Olympia
- Church: Episcopal Church
- Diocese: Diocese of Olympia
- Elected: February 29, 1964
- In office: 1964-1976
- Predecessor: William F. Lewis
- Successor: Robert H. Cochrane
- Previous post: Suffragan Bishop of Los Angeles (1960-1964)

Orders
- Ordination: February 1936 by Henry Knox Sherrill
- Consecration: April 29, 1960 by Arthur C. Lichtenberger

Personal details
- Born: June 18, 1908 Watkins, Minnesota, United States
- Died: March 1, 1994 (aged 85) Seattle, Washington, United States
- Denomination: Anglican
- Parents: Ira Carlos Curtis & Nina Chisholm
- Spouse: Lillian Alice Kinney (m. 1936)
- Children: 2

Ivol Ira Curtis (June 18, 1908 – March 1, 1994) was a prelate of the Episcopal Church who served as Bishop of Olympia from 1964 to 1976.

== Early life and education ==
Curtis was born on June 18, 1908, in Watkins, Minnesota, the son of Ira Carlos Curtis and Nina Chisholm. He studied at Carleton College and graduated with a Bachelor of Arts in 1932. He then entered Seabury-Western Theological Seminary and earned a Bachelor of Divinity in 1935. He was awarded a Doctor of Divinity from Occidental College in 1960.

== Ordained Ministry ==
Curtis was ordained deacon in June 1935 by Bishop Frank McElwain of Minnesota, and priest in February 1936 by Bishop Henry Knox Sherrill of Massachusetts. He married Lillian Alice Kinney on April 16, 1936, and had two sons. His first appointment was as curate at Emanuel Church in Boston from 1935 to 1937;, after which he became rector of St Peter's Church in Cazenovia, New York, where he remained until 1942. He then became rector of St John's Church in Jamaica Plain, Boston, while in 1947 he became rector of All Saints Church in Pontiac, Michigan. Between 1953 and 1960 he was rector of St James' Church in Los Angeles.

== Episcopacy ==
Curtis was elected Suffragan Bishop of Los Angeles in 1960 and was consecrated on April 29, 1960, in St Paul's Cathedral, Los Angeles with Presiding Bishop Arthur C. Lichtenberger as chief consecrator. On February 29, 1964, he was elected as Coadjutor Bishop of Olympia and succeeded as diocesan on September 6, 1964. He retired in 1976 and later served as Assistant Bishop in Los Angeles. He died following a stroke on March 1, 1994, in Seattle.

== See also ==
- List of bishops of the Episcopal Church in the United States of America
