= Masonic Temple (Long Beach, California) =

Masonic temple in Long Beach, California, U.S.

Coordinates: 33°46′11″N 118°11′32″W

Long Beach Historic Landmark

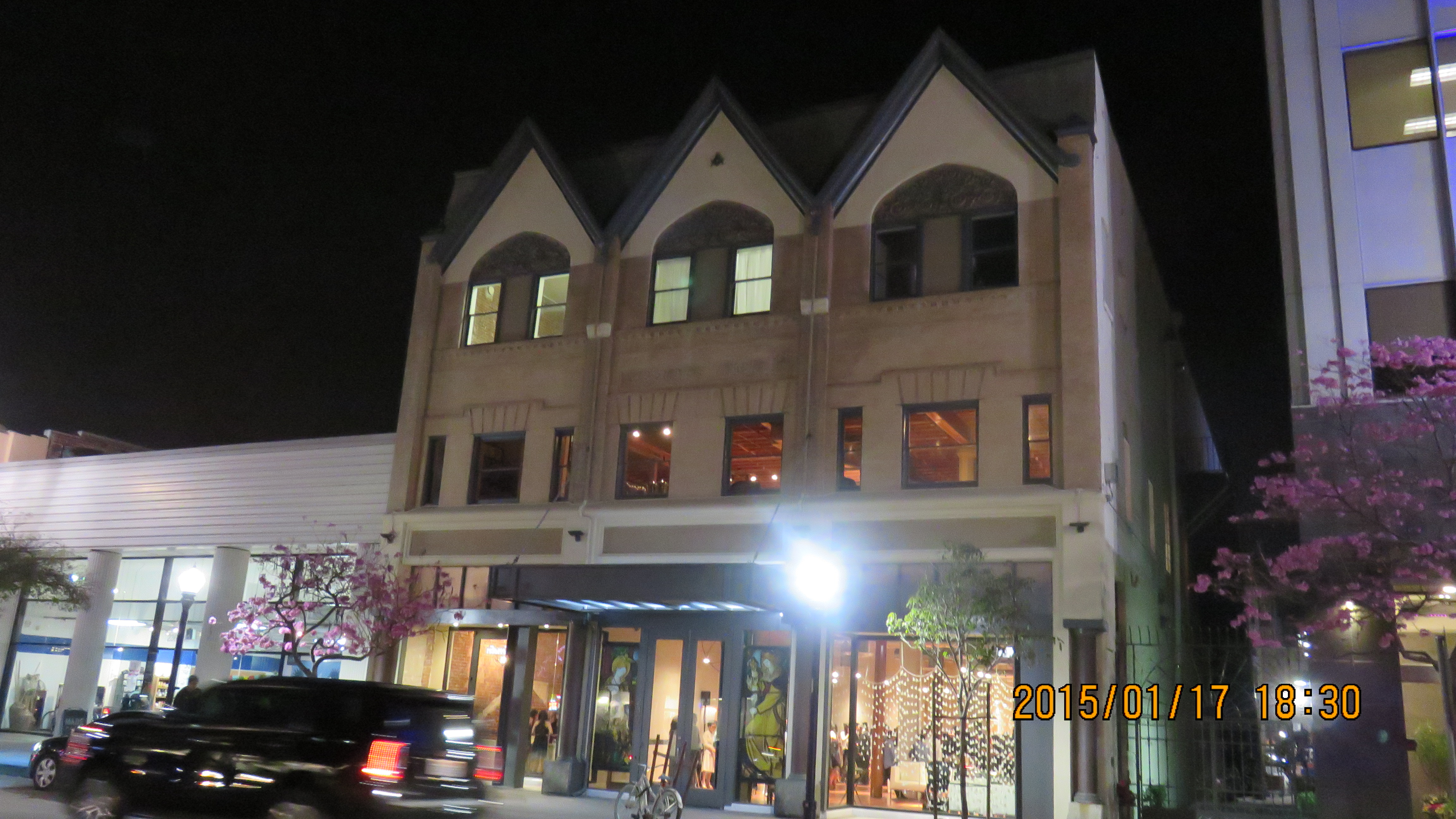

General information
- Address: 230 Pine Ave., Long Beach, CA 90802

Design and construction
- Architect(s): Henry F. Starbuck

Website
- www.altarlongbeach.com

The Masonic Temple at 230 Pine Ave. in downtown Long Beach, California was built in 1903. It is listed on the List of City of Long Beach historic landmarks.

It is "one of the last remaining examples of eminent local architect Henry F. Starbuck, who designed many of the city's turn-of-the-century buildings."

It was renovated and restored in the 1980s, and was remodelled in the 1990s for use by Z Gallerie, a store. It later became an events venue. It is now home to the Altar Society Brewing & Coffee Company.

== See also ==
- Scottish Rite Cathedral (Long Beach, California)
