= Robert H. Cochrane =

American bishop

The Right Reverend Robert H. Cochrane
- Bishop of Olympia
- Church: Episcopal Church
- Diocese: Diocese of Olympia
- Elected: 1975
- In office: 1976-1990
- Predecessor: Ivol Curtis
- Successor: Vincent Waydell Warner Jr.

Orders
- Ordination: November 3, 1951 (priest)
- Consecration: January 25, 1976 by John Allin

Personal details
- Born: July 9, 1924 Charleston, South Carolina, United States
- Died: May 7, 2010 (aged 85) Seattle, Washington, United States
- Denomination: Anglican
- Parents: Raven Hume & William Arthur Cochrane
- Spouse: Theresa M. Tripi (m. 1951)
- Children: 2

Robert Hume Cochrane (July 9, 1924 – May 7, 2010) was bishop of the Diocese of Olympia in the Episcopal Church, serving from 1976 until his retirement in 1990.

== Early life and education ==
Cochrane was born on July 9, 1924, in Charleston, South Carolina, the son of Raven Hume and William Arthur Cochrane. He was raised in Brooklyn and studied at Brooklyn College. In 1942, he paused his studies and joined the U.S. Army and served as a hospital medic in England and combat infantry medic in Germany and France. During his military career, he attained the rank of sergeant. After the war he returned to Brooklyn College, from where he earned a Bachelor of Arts in English and speech in 1948. While in college he met Theresa M. Tripi whom he eventually married on June 9, 1951. He also graduated with a Masters of Divinity from the General Theological Seminary in 1951, and was awarded a Doctor of Divinity in 1976 by the same seminary.

== Ordained Ministry ==
Cochrane was ordained deacon on March 31, 1951, and priest on November 3, 1951. He served as vicar of Redeemer Church in Delano, California from 1951 until 1952, and then curate of Trinity Church in Reno, Nevada between 1952 and 1954. He then became vicar of St Timothy's Church in Henderson, Nevada where he remained until 1960. In 1960, he accepted the post of rector of All Saints Church in Salt Lake City while in 1969 he moved to Tacoma, Washington to serve as rector of Christ Church.

== Episcopacy ==
In 1975 Cochrane was elected Bishop of Olympia and was consecrated on January 25, 1976, with Presiding Bishop John Allin as principal consecrator. As part of his contributions to the wider church, he co-authored the canon authorizing lay Eucharistic ministers to take communion from the church to the sick and shut-in. He was also involved in the creation of the Refugee Resettlement Ministry in response to a surge in refugees from Vietnam. He was also quite close with the Roman Catholic Archbishop Raymond Hunthausen of Seattle and together established a covenant between both respective dioceses in which the two churches agreed to work for unity, social justice, and pray for one another. He also helped strengthen the diocese's finances. He was also involved in the Standing Commission on Church Music which produced The Hymnal 1982. He retired in 1990. Cochrane died on May 7, 2010, in Seattle, after a battle with cholangiocarcinoma.
