= Stephen F. Bayne Jr. =

Episcopalian bishop

The Right Reverend Stephen F. Bayne
- Bishop of Olympia
- Church: Episcopal Church
- Diocese: Olympia
- Elected: December 9, 1946
- In office: 1947–1959
- Predecessor: Simeon Arthur Huston
- Successor: William F. Lewis
- Previous post: Bishop of the Convocation of Episcopal Churches in Europe (1959–1964)

Orders
- Ordination: May 22, 1932 (deacon); June 11, 1933 (priest) by William T. Manning
- Consecration: June 11, 1947 by Henry Knox Sherrill

Personal details
- Born: May 21, 1908 New York City, New York, United States
- Died: January 18, 1974 (aged 65) Santurce, San Juan, Puerto Rico
- Buried: Trinity Church Cemetery
- Denomination: Anglican
- Parents: Stephen Fielding Bayne & Edna Mabel Ashley
- Spouse: Lucie Culver Gould (m. 1934)
- Children: 5

Stephen Fielding Bayne Jr. (May 21, 1908 – January 18, 1974) was bishop of the Diocese of Olympia in The Episcopal Church between 1947 and 1959 and the first Executive Officer of the Anglican Communion from 1960 until 1964.

== Early life and ministry ==
Bayne was born on May 21, 1908 in New York City to Stephen Fielding Bayne Sr and Edna Mabel Ashley. He was educated at Amherst College where he received a B.A. in 1929. Bayne then attended General Theological Seminary from which he received an S.T.B. in 1933. He remained at General Theological Seminary for two years as a fellow and tutor. He was ordained to the diaconate of the Episcopal Church in 1932 and to the priesthood in 1933. He served as a parish priest in St. Louis and Northampton, Massachusetts, until 1941, when he was appointed chaplain and chairman of the department of religion at Columbia University where he remained until 1947, except for two years of duty as a Naval chaplain in World War II. On December 9, 1946, he was elected bishop of the Diocese of Olympia on the fourth ballot as a surprise nomination from the floor. He served until 1959, when he resigned to accept an appointment by the Archbishop of Canterbury as the first Executive Officer of the Anglican Communion; he took up the role on January 1, 1960, and held simultaneous responsibility for the American Episcopal churches of Europe.

== Anglican Communion ==
The Anglican Communion was just beginning to step into a more significant and authoritative role as a liaison between the various Anglican church bodies. Bayne is reported to have said regarding this new appointment, "I am rather like a mosquito in a nudist camp. I know what I ought to do, but I don't know where to begin."

The apex of his time as Executive Officer was the 1963 Anglican Congress in Toronto. There, delegates approved a document drafted primarily by Bayne titled “Mutual Responsibility and Interdependence in the Body of Christ.” MRI called for new patterns of being Anglican marked by “the birth of entirely new relationships” and declared “our unity in Christ… is the most profound bond among us, in all our political and racial and cultural diversity.” MRI — and Bayne —w as widely hailed as a break with an outdated Anglican past, even appearing on the front page of The New York Times.

Bayne stepped down as Executive Officer in October 1964. He narrowly lost the election for presiding bishop that year but still accepted a position at the Episcopal Church Center in New York. As a bishop, he chaired the heresy investigation of Bishop Pike. In 1970, he returned to General Seminary as professor and later dean. He died on January 18, 1974.

== Bibliography ==
- The Crisis of Spirituality in the Church (1973)
