= Alfred Lee (bishop) =

American Episcopal bishop

The Most Reverend Alfred Lee
- 10th Presiding Bishop of the Episcopal Church
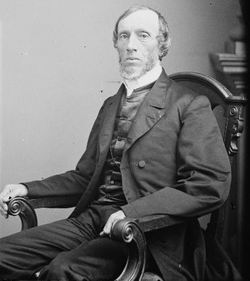
- Church: Episcopal Church
- Elected: May 31, 1884
- In office: 1884–1887
- Predecessor: Benjamin B. Smith
- Successor: John Williams
- Other post: Bishop of Delaware (1841-1887)

Orders
- Ordination: June 12, 1838 by Thomas Church Brownell
- Consecration: October 12, 1841 by Alexander Viets Griswold

Personal details
- Born: September 9, 1807 Cambridge, Massachusetts, United States
- Died: April 12, 1887 (aged 79) Wilmington, Delaware, United States
- Denomination: Anglican
- Parents: Benjamin Lee & Elizabeth Leighton
- Spouse: Julia White
- Education: Harvard University

Alfred Lee (September 9, 1807 – April 12, 1887) was an American Episcopal bishop. He was born in Cambridge, Massachusetts, graduated from Harvard in 1827, and after three years practicing law in New London, Connecticut, he studied for the ministry, graduating from the General Theological Seminary, New York, in 1837. He was rector of Calvary Church, in Rockdale, Pa., from 1838 to 1841, when he was chosen as the first Bishop of Delaware. In 1842 he also became rector of St. Andrew's, Wilmington. He was a member of the American Committee for the Revision of the New Testament (1881). In 1884 he succeeded Bishop Smith as presiding bishop of the Episcopal church.

== Early life ==
Alfred Lee's father was a midshipman in the British Navy who served with honor and distinction until he left the service when he decided to come to America. Little is known about Lee's mother. On September 9, 1807, Alfred Lee was born in Cambridge, Massachusetts. His family was upper–middle class and lived in one of the most prestigious houses in Cambridge. His house is the subject of Henry Wadsworth Longfellow's poem "The Open Window". Lee graduated from Harvard University law in 1827, and started his career as an apprentice of law. However, this profession soon lost its appeal to him, and he began looking for a more fulfilling one.

== Start of his religious career ==
Lee moved to New York City and enrolled in General Theological Seminary. After graduating, Lee was elected deacon of Trinity Church in Norwich Connecticut on June 12, 1838. From there, he moved around a lot. His first services as rector were given on September 12 at Calvary church in Rockdale, Pennsylvania, where he lived for three years. During this time he established himself as a notable figure in the local and global Ecclesiastical communities.

== Election as bishop ==
In 1841, the General Episcopal Convention was held in Georgetown, Delaware. During the convention it was resolved to separate the diocese Delaware from that of Pennsylvania. No longer would Delaware's clerical needs be overshadowed by those of the much larger state of Pennsylvania. Lee was very well respected in his community because of his demeanor, candor, and resolve; he unanimously won the vote of both the Clerical and Lay Deputies, and was consecrated as the first Bishop of Delaware and the 38th Bishop of America on October 12, 1841, at the age of thirty-four. When Lee arrived in Delaware, only seven Episcopalian parishes held services on a regular basis, and Delaware had only four ordained and acting ministers.

== Work in Delaware ==
In June 1842, Lee was asked to fill in as a temporary rector at St. Andrews parish in Wilmington, Delaware. Being quite impressed by his service, the parish asked him to become the permanent rector in 1843. Through his extensive travels, Lee also became president of the Mexican Commission. His willingness to take on responsibilities that were not required of him was a testament to his great determination. In 1884, this devotion to service served him well as he became the Presiding Bishop of the Protestant Episcopal Church in The United States of America with the passing of Bishop Benjamin Bosworth Smith. A decade earlier, he had assisted Presiding Bishop Smith in consecrating James Theodore Holly as missionary bishop for Haiti; thus Rt.Rev. Holly became the first African-American to be consecrated a bishop in the Protestant Episcopal Church.

== Death ==
In January 1887, Lee caught typhoid fever, the disease that would ail him until his death four months later. At 3:30 on April 12, 1887, Alfred Lee died. His funeral service was held at his beloved St. Andrews Church. In 1881, after serving as the Bishop of Delaware for forty years, Lee reflected on his service as Bishop. He had built twenty-four churches and brought two previously abandoned churches back into service. He had baptized 4,327 people and confirmed 10,082 others. He had traveled across the globe; he went to England for the Lambeth conference and Mexico to set up missions. Lee wrote five formal publications: Life of Saint Peter (1852), Life of Saint John (1854), A Treatise on Baptism (1854), Memoir of Susan Allibone (1856), Harbinger of Christ (1857), and Coöperative Revision of the New Testament (1881). He was extraordinarily well respected. In his time of need he received countless letters of encouragement and support. He had two sons; one was a lawyer and the other a doctor. And he had one daughter by the name of Mrs. McIlvaine.

== Stance on slavery ==
Lee's position against slavery was critical because he was one of the few public figures in Delaware who opposed it. All of his early years were spent in the north, completely removed from the horrors of slavery. The three years he spent preaching in Pennsylvania were the closest he was to slavery prior to his consecration. Undoubtedly he experienced a culture shock when he first arrived in Delaware. Because Lee did not grow up around slavery, he was not desensitized to it. By coming to the south as an outsider, he was able to see the atrocities of slavery for what they were. He did not, at the start of his service, preach radically against slavery out of self-preservation. If he had become public with his views, he may have been thrown out the House of Bishops. The gradual strengthening of his anti-slavery claims through his sermons allowed for his view to slowly seep into the minds of his congregations and followers. His tact served him well in office. Alfred Lee was a highly regarded man who paved the way for a radical switch in the Episcopal Church's stand on slavery in the 1860s.

== See also ==
- List of presiding bishops of the Episcopal Church in the United States of America
- List of Episcopal bishops of the United States
- Historical list of the Episcopal bishops of the United States

Episcopal Church (USA) titles
Preceded by Benjamin Bosworth Smith	10th Presiding Bishop; 1884–1887	Succeeded by John Williams
Preceded by Henry Onderdonk; Provisional Bishop of Delaware	1st Bishop of Delaware; 1841–1887	Succeeded by Leighton Coleman
