= Trinity Parish Church (Seattle) =

Historic church in Washington, United States

- U.S. National Register of Historic Places
- Seattle Landmark
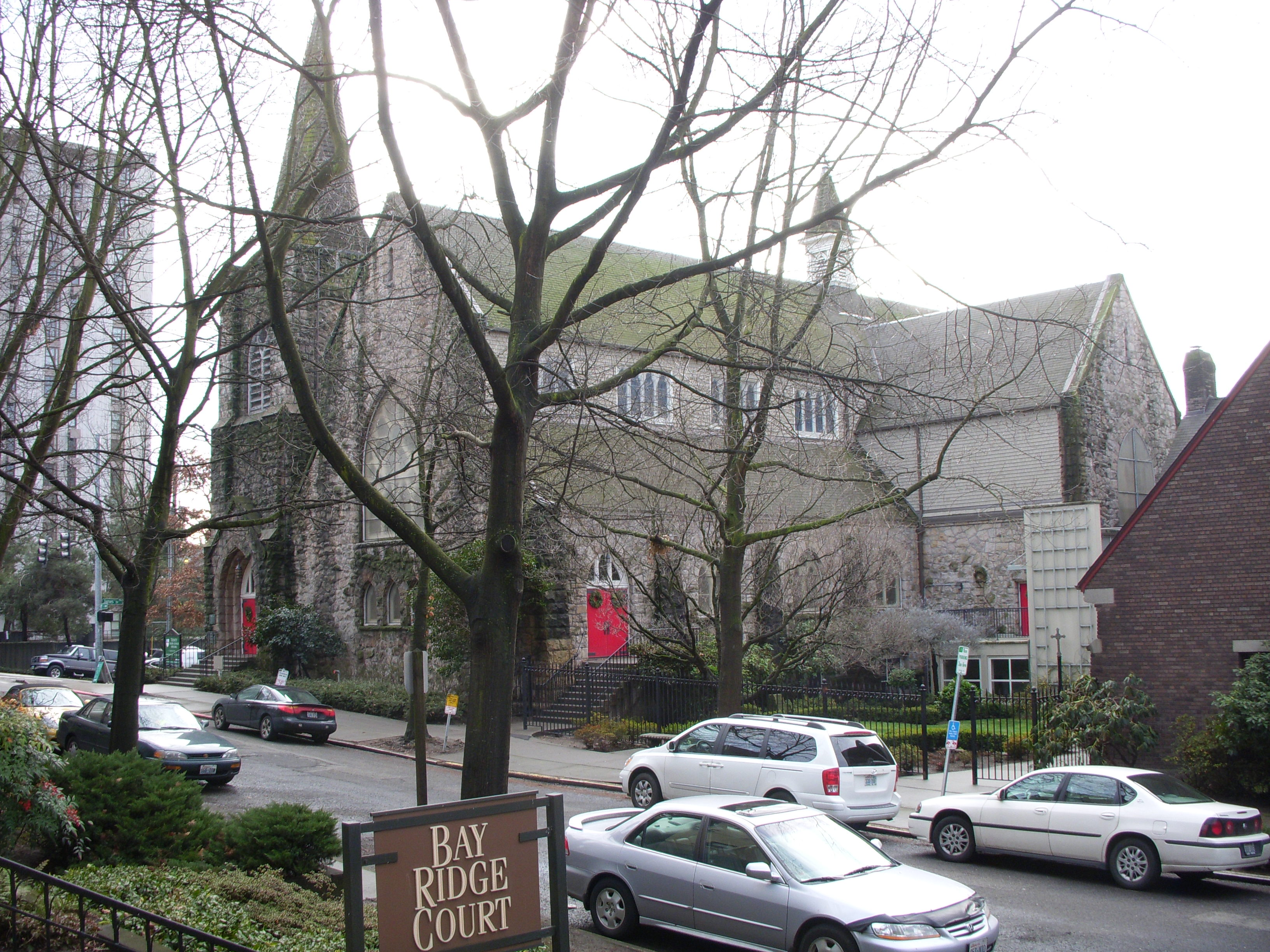
- Viewed from the north

- Location within Downtown Seattle
- Location: 609 Eighth Ave. Seattle, Washington
- Coordinates: 47°36′18.5″N 122°19′34.8″W
- Area: less than one acre
- Built: 1902
- Architect: Henry F. Starbuck; John Graham, Sr.
- Architectural style: Early English Gothic Revival
- NRHP reference No.: 91001440
- SEATL No.: 106087

Significant dates
- Added to NRHP: September 26, 1991
- Designated SEATL: December 27, 1976

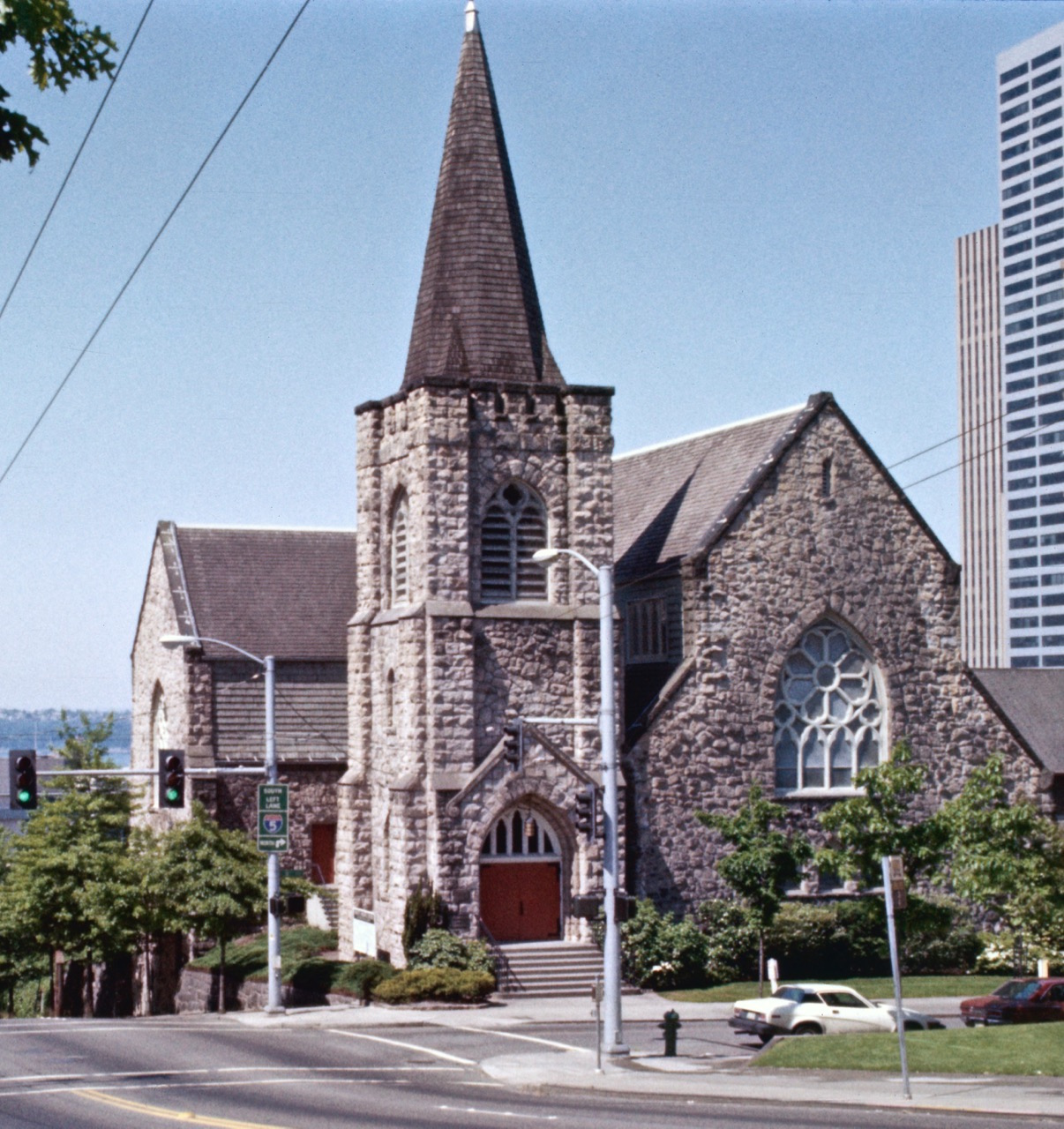
The church viewed from the east in 1982. Since the late 1980s, photos taken from this angle have included downtown skyscrapers prominently in the background.

Trinity Parish Church is a historic church located in the First Hill neighborhood of Seattle, Washington, that was added to the National Register of Historic Places in 1991. It is an Episcopal congregation in the Diocese of Olympia.

== History ==
Trinity Parish Church, Seattle's first Episcopal church, was established on August 13, 1865. The congregation's first church building, which was located at Third Avenue and Jefferson Street, was not erected until 1870. This wooden building was consumed in the Great Fire of 1889. The church then moved to its present site, at 609 Eighth Avenue, where a replacement building was constructed, opening in 1892. It was designed by Chicago-based architect Henry F. Starbuck in English Gothic Revival style, and its construction was overseen by Charles A. Alexander. In 1902, a fire swept through the interior, leaving only the exterior walls. Seattle architect John Graham, Sr. was hired to rebuild the church as well as increase its size. Despite the additions, Graham maintained the English Gothic Revival style while adding German stained glass windows and an altar of Italian marble.

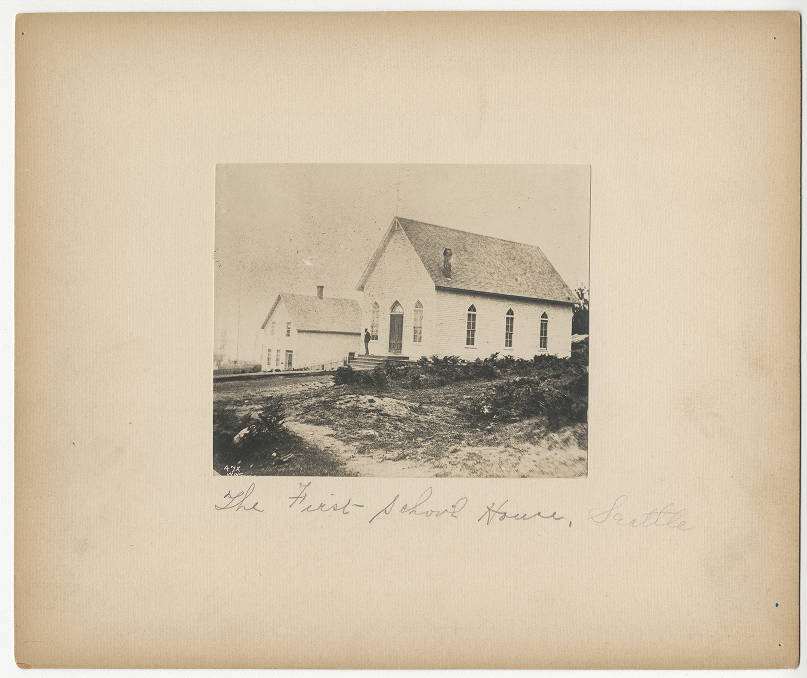
The original Trinity Parish Church in 1874 before it burnt down in 1889

The stained glass windows were designed by the Franz Mayer & Co. of Munich, Germany. The Carrara marble altar was designed and fabricated in Italy with mother of pearl, ceramic tile and Venetian gold glass.

Trinity is a parish in the Episcopal Diocese of Olympia, known as the Episcopal Church in Western Washington, a diocese of the Episcopal Church in Washington state west of the Cascade Range.

The church building was designated a Seattle Landmark in 1976 and has also received state landmark status. It was added to the U.S. National Register of Historic Places in 1991.

The building was severely damaged in the 2001 Nisqually earthquake, but the altar, reredos and windows all survived fully intact. It was rebuilt, restored and earthquake-retrofitted. This work was completed in late 2005. Architects for this project were Bassetti Architects.
