= Benjamin B. Smith =

American Episcopal bishop (1794–1884)

The Most Reverend Benjamin Bosworth Smith
- 9th Presiding Bishop of the Episcopal Church
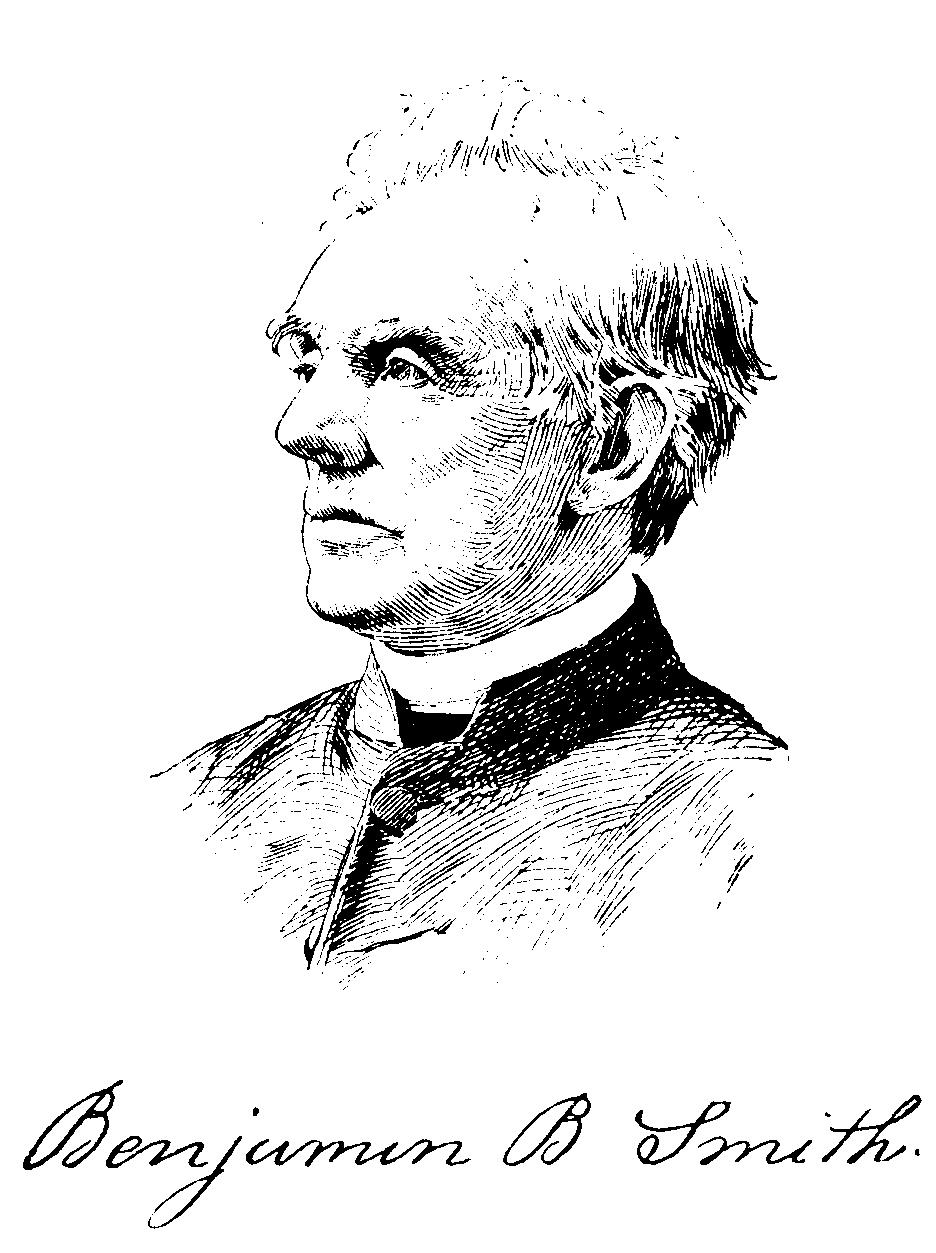
- Church: Episcopal Church
- In office: 1868–1884
- Predecessor: John Henry Hopkins
- Successor: Alfred Lee
- Other post: Bishop of Kentucky (1832-1884)

Orders
- Ordination: June 24, 1818 by Alexander Viets Griswold
- Consecration: October 31, 1832 by William White

Personal details
- Born: June 13, 1794 Bristol, Rhode Island, United States
- Died: May 31, 1884 (aged 89) New York City, New York, United States
- Buried: Frankfort Cemetery
- Denomination: Anglican
- Parents: Stephen Smith & Ruth Bosworth
- Spouse: Elizabeth Bosworth (m. 1818, d. 1833); Harriet L. Staples (m. 1835)
- Education: Brown University

Benjamin Bosworth Smith (June 13, 1794 – May 31, 1884) was an American Protestant Episcopal bishop, and the Presiding Bishop of his Church beginning in 1868.

== Early life ==
Smith was born in Bristol, Rhode Island. His father died when Smith was 5 years old. Smith graduated from Brown University in 1816.

== Career ==
The following year he was ordained, beginning his ministry at Marblehead, Mass. He held several pastoral charges and was for a time editor of the Episcopal Recorder at Philadelphia. His last rectorship, in Lexington, Kentucky, he held until 1837, though in 1832 he had become Bishop of the diocese. While he was presiding Bishop (from 1868), a separatist movement, which became the Reformed Episcopal Church, was organized under the leadership of Bishop Smith's own assistant bishop, George David Cummins. He published Saturday Evening (1876) and Apostolic Succession (1877).

In 1840, Smith was appointed by the Governor of Kentucky to serve as the third Kentucky Superintendent of Public Instruction. In the late 1860s, he helped establish schools and hire teachers to work with former slaves throughout the south.

In 1874, Presiding Bishop Smith led the consecration of James Theodore Holly, the first African-American to be consecrated a bishop in the Protestant Episcopal church, and who became the missionary bishop for Haiti.

== Architecture ==
Smith is not to be confused with Benjamin Bosworth Smith (architect) (1863–1926), a related but different architect based in Montgomery, Alabama.

Smith is listed as the architect of several buildings, including some listed on the U.S. National Register of Historic Places:

- Church of the Advent, Episcopal (1855), 122 N. Walnut St. Cynthiana, KY, Gothic Revival in style (Smith, Bishop Benjamin Bosworth)
- St. Paul's Episcopal Church (1859–60), 338 Center St. Henderson, KY (Smith, Bishop Benjamin Bosworth) a "chaste" example of Gothic Revival style applied to churches
- St. Philip's Episcopal Church (1860–61), Short and Chiles Sts. Harrodsburg, KY (Smith, Bishop Benjamin Bosworth)
- Holy Trinity Episcopal Church (1864–68), Georgetown, Kentucky (Smith, Bishop Benjamin Bosworth)

== Memorials/legacies ==
Smith's home at 2833 Tremont Ave. in Highlands, Kentucky or Highlands, Louisville, or Louisville, Kentucky was considered for landmarking but was approved for demolition in 2017. A Gothic-style small study with a peaked roof that Smith used at his Louisville home is preserved on the grounds of the St. Francis in the Fields Episcopal Church ("near Prospect" in Louisville, Kentucky?).

== See also ==
- List of presiding bishops of the Episcopal Church in the United States of America
- List of Episcopal bishops of the United States
- Historical list of the Episcopal bishops of the United States

== Sources ==
- This article incorporates text from a publication now in the public domain: Gilman, D. C.; Peck, H. T.; Colby, F. M., eds. (1905). New International Encyclopedia (1st ed.). New York: Dodd, Mead.

Episcopal Church (USA) titles
Preceded by John Henry Hopkins	9th Presiding Bishop; 1868–1884	Succeeded by Alfred Lee
Preceded by New Diocese	1st Bishop of Kentucky; 1832–1884	Succeeded by Thomas U. Dudley
