= St. Philip's Episcopal Church (Harrodsburg, Kentucky) =

Historic church in Kentucky, United States

- St. Philips Episcopal Church
- U.S. National Register of Historic Places
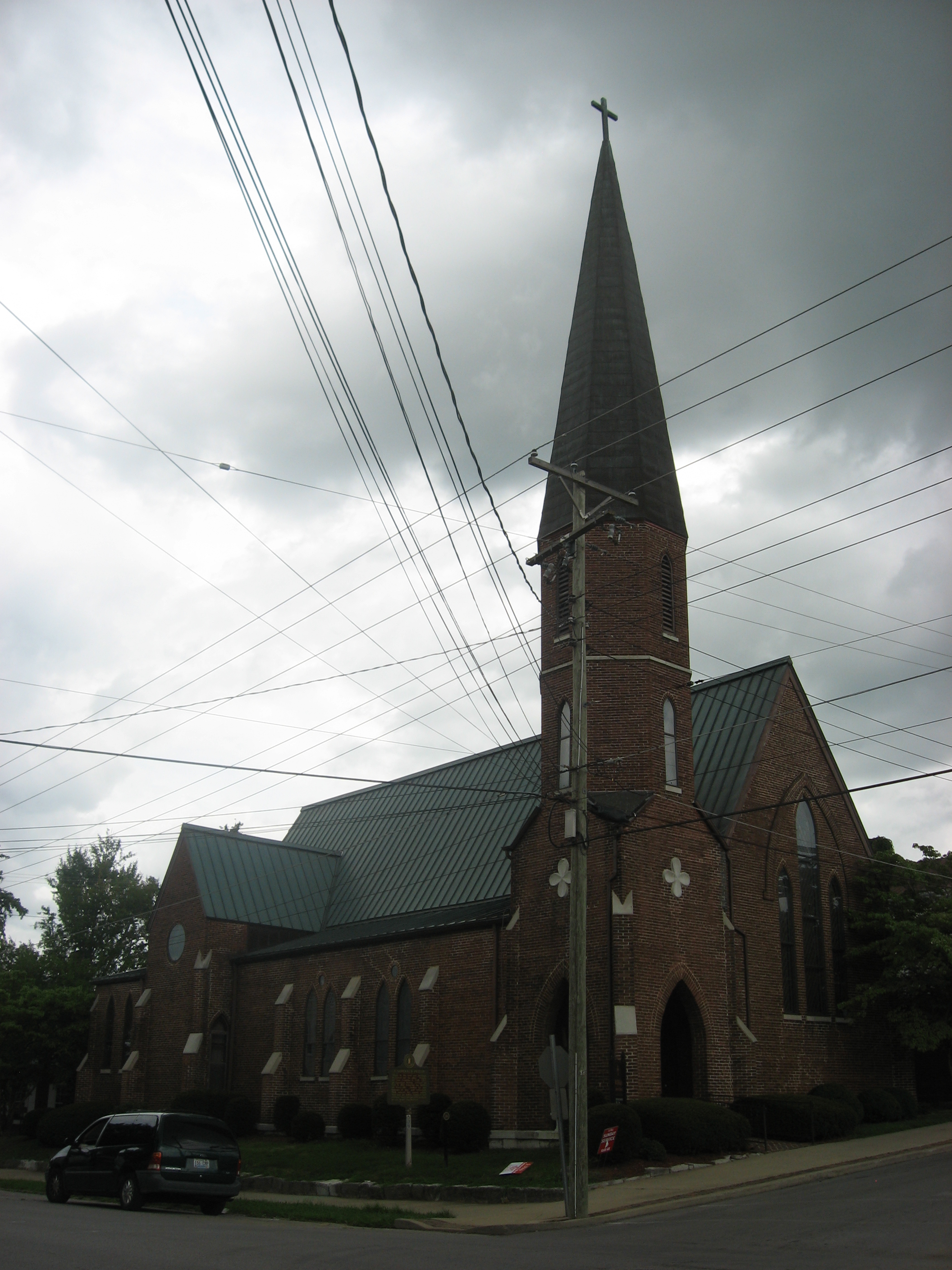

- Location within Kentucky Location within the United States
- Location: Short and Chiles Sts., Harrodsburg, Kentucky
- Coordinates: 37°45′39″N 84°50′40″W
- Area: 0.5 acres (0.20 ha)
- Built: 1860-61
- Architect: Bishop Benjamin Bosworth Smith
- Architectural style: Gothic Revival
- NRHP reference No.: 78001389
- Added to NRHP: January 31, 1978

The St. Philips Episcopal Church in Harrodsburg, Kentucky is a historic church at Short and Chiles Streets. It was built during 1860-1861 and was added to the National Register in 1978.

It is a brick church with granite trim. It is approximately 90 by 30 feet (27.4 m × 9.1 m) or 90 by 35 feet (27 m × 11 m) in plan.
