= Philip LaBelle =

American Episcopal bishop

The Right Reverend Philip N. LaBelle
- Bishop of Olympia
- Church: Episcopal Church
- Diocese: Diocese of Olympia
- Elected: May 18, 2024
- In office: 2024-
- Predecessor: Gregory Rickel

Orders
- Ordination: June 19, 2004 (deacon); January 23, 2005 (priest) by Gordon Scruton
- Consecration: September 14, 2024 by Michael Curry

Personal details
- Denomination: Anglican
- Spouse: Melissa Tobey (m. 1995)
- Children: 2
- Education: Gordon College (BA), Northeastern University (MA), Yale University (MDiv)

Philip Noah LaBelle is an American Episcopal bishop who has served as the Bishop of the Diocese of Olympia since September 14, 2024. Prior to his election as bishop, LaBelle earned a Master of Divinity at Yale University and a Doctor of Ministry from Fuller Theological Seminary, and served parishes in Connecticut, Massachusetts, and Colorado.

On February 28, 2024, the Joint Board for Bishop Transition of the Episcopal Diocese of Olympia announced LaBelle as one of its nominees for bishop.

LaBelle was elected Bishop of Olympia on the fourth ballot in a diocesan electing convention on May 18, 2024.

At the time of his election, LaBelle was serving as rector of Saint Mark's Episcopal Church in Southborough, Massachusetts.

LaBelle is married to Melissa Tobey LaBelle, an assistant professor at Bridgewater State University. The couple have two adult children.

Episcopal Church (USA) titles
Preceded by Gregory Rickel	9th Bishop of Olympia; 2024 - present	Succeeded by Incumbent
