= St. Mark's Episcopal Cathedral, Seattle =

St. Mark's Episcopal Cathedral
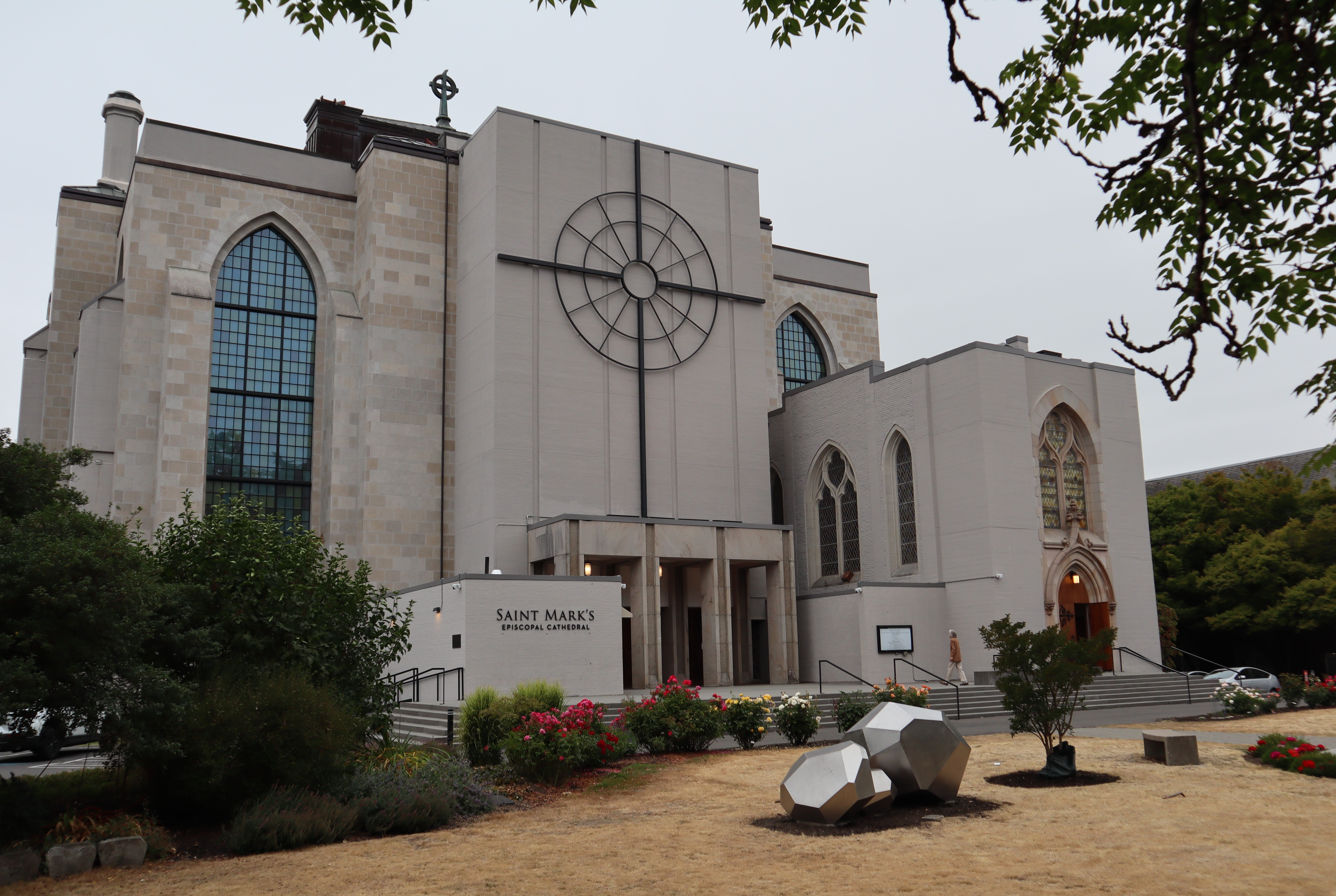
- The cathedral in 2026
- St. Mark's Episcopal Cathedral
- 47°37′55″N 122°19′17″W
- Location: Capitol Hill, Seattle, Washington
- Country: United States
- Denomination: Episcopal Church in the United States of America
- Website: saintmarks.org

History
- Status: Cathedral
- Founded: 1889
- Dedicated: 25 April 1931

Architecture
- Designated: 1926
- Architect(s): John Bakewell Jr., Arthur Brown Jr., and Édouard Frère Champney
- Groundbreaking: 1928
- Completed: Never completed
- Closed: 1941–1943 (reopened as a cathedral in 1944)

Administration
- Diocese: Olympia

Clergy
- Bishop: The Rt. Rev. Philip N. LaBelle
- Vicar: The Rev. Canon Emily A. Griffin
- Dean: The Very Rev. Steven L. Thomason

St. Mark's Episcopal Cathedral in Seattle, Washington, is the seat of the bishop of the Episcopal Diocese of Olympia. St. Mark's was founded as a mission church of Trinity Parish Church.

In 2025, the cathedral reported 3,272 members. Average Sunday Attendance (ASA) reported by the cathedral in 2025 was 731 persons.

== History ==
Plans for the building, located on the west side of 10th Avenue East between East Highland Drive and East Galer Street on Capitol Hill, were drawn up in 1926. Fundraising took place for two years until construction began in 1928. Ground was broken on September 30, 1928. The Great Depression took a toll on the parish, however. Construction was incomplete when the cathedral was dedicated on April 25, 1931, and the parish was in default on its mortgage throughout the 1930s. The cathedral was foreclosed upon in 1941 and shut for the next two years. From 1943 to 1944, the United States Army used the cathedral as an anti-aircraft training facility; the evidence of this era can still be seen in murals in the crypt.

In 1944, Bishop S. Arthur Huston reopened discussions with the parish's bankers in St. Louis, Missouri; over the next three years, more funds were raised, and in 1947 the mortgage was paid. The mortgage document was burned before the Parish on Palm Sunday.

The cathedral's dean, Robert V. Taylor, resigned abruptly in March 2008, stating that he and the vestry (church board) diverged in their visions for the future of St. Mark's and there was a loss of trust between them.

Taylor was succeeded by Steven Lynn Thomason in the summer of 2012.

Thomason shares clerical ministry with the Rev. Canon Emily A. Griffin as Vicar, the Rev. Canon Richard C. Weyls as associate rector, the Rev. Earl Grout as deacon, and a handful of non-stipendiary priests.

== Location ==
St. Mark's Cathedral is located at the top of a very steep drop-off to Lakeview Boulevard East below. The wooded hillside is known as the St. Mark's Greenbelt.

== Organ ==
The choir loft of St. Mark's is home to one of the largest pipe organs in Seattle. The organ was built in 1965 by D. A. Flentrop (Zaandam, Netherlands) and restored in 1993-1994 and 2001 by Paul Fritts & Company Organ Builders, Tacoma. Further additions followed in 1995 (new chorus reeds 16' and 8' in Manual II) and 1996 (Zymbelstern). In 2011, Paul Fritts installed new horizontal reed stops (the former horizontal trumpets from 1965 were stored). The instrument has 58 stops/79 ranks on four manuals/pedal, and contains 3,944 pipes. The current organists are Michael Kleinschmidt (Canon Musician), and John Stuntebeck (Associate Organist).

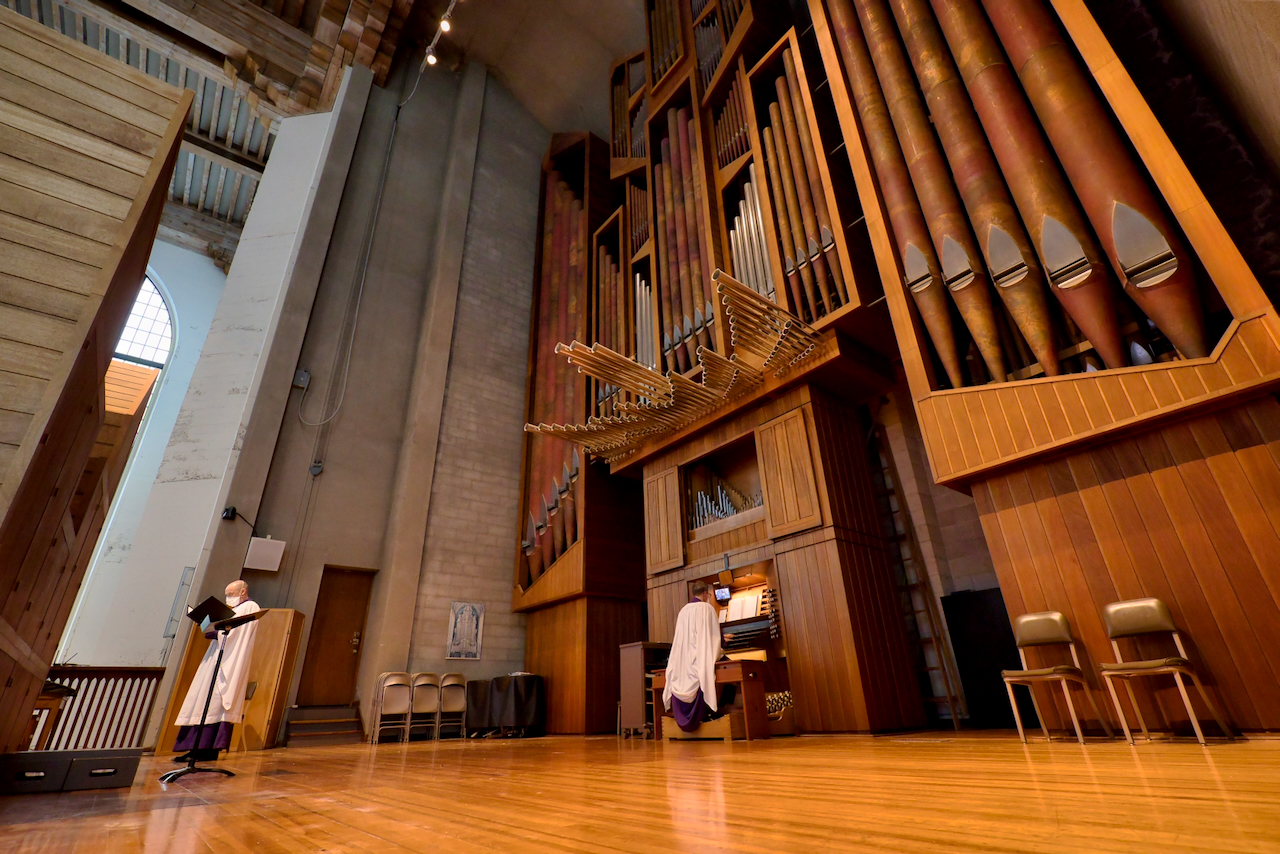
The Flentrop organ and its console, seen from the choir loft

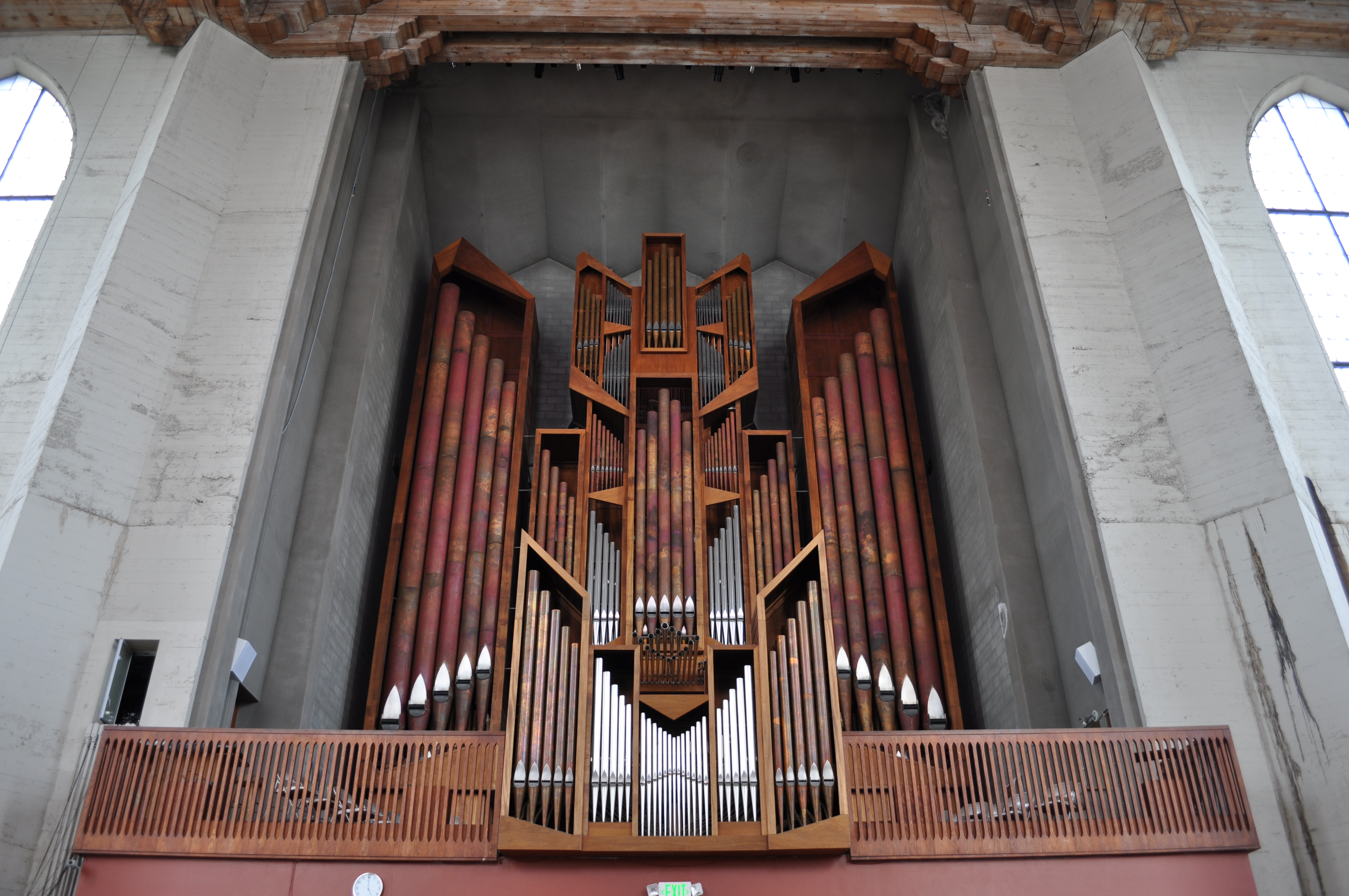
The Flentrop organ in the choir loft, at the rear of the nave

== See also ==
- List of the Episcopal cathedrals of the United States
- List of cathedrals in the United States
- Compline Choir
