= Episcopal Diocese of Olympia =

Diocese of the Episcopal Church in the United States

Coordinates: 47°36′N 122°20′W

Diocese of Olympia Dioecesis Olympianae

Location
- Country: United States
- Territory: Clallam, Clark, Cowlitz, Grays Harbor, Island, Jefferson, King, Kitsap, Lewis, Mason, Pacific, Pierce, San Juan, Skagit, Skamania, Snohomish, Thurston, Whatcom, and Wahkiakum counties in Washington state
- Ecclesiastical province: Province VIII

Statistics
- Congregations: 89 (2025)
- Members: 17,700 (2025)

Information
- Denomination: Episcopal Church
- Rite: Episcopal
- Established: September 14, 1910
- Cathedral: St Mark's Cathedral
- Language: English, Spanish

Current leadership
- Bishop: Philip N. LaBelle

Map
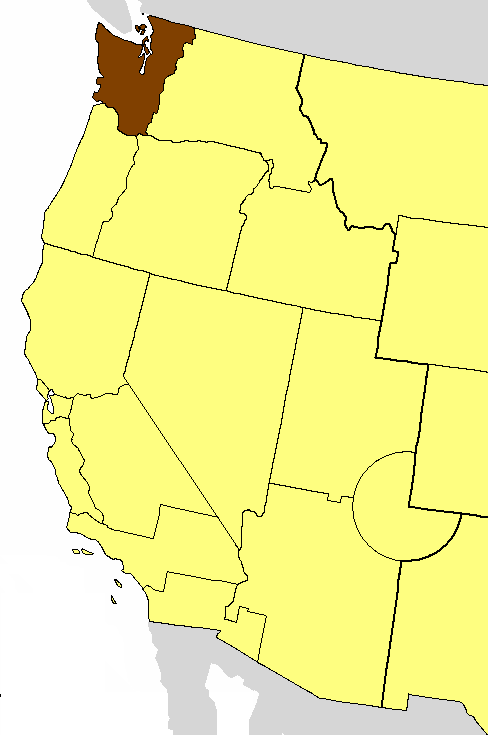
- Location of the Diocese of Olympia

Website
- www.ecww.org

The Episcopal Diocese of Olympia, also known as the Episcopal Church in Western Washington, is a diocese of the Episcopal Church in Washington state west of the Cascade Range. It is one of 17 dioceses and an area mission that make up Province 8. The diocese started as a missionary district in 1853 and was formally established in 1910.

The name of the diocese refers to the region of "Olympia" and is not related to the state capital Olympia. The see city is Seattle, with St. Mark's the cathedral church of the diocese. Philip N. LaBelle was consecrated as the Diocese's ninth bishop on September 14, 2024.

The diocese reported 25,328 members in 2015 and 17,799 members in 2025. Plate and pledge income for the 89 filing congregations of the diocese in 2025 was $26,578,322. Average Sunday attendance (ASA) in 2025 was 6,463 persons. This was a relative decrease from 8,976 persons attending on an average Sunday reported in 2015.

== Bishops ==
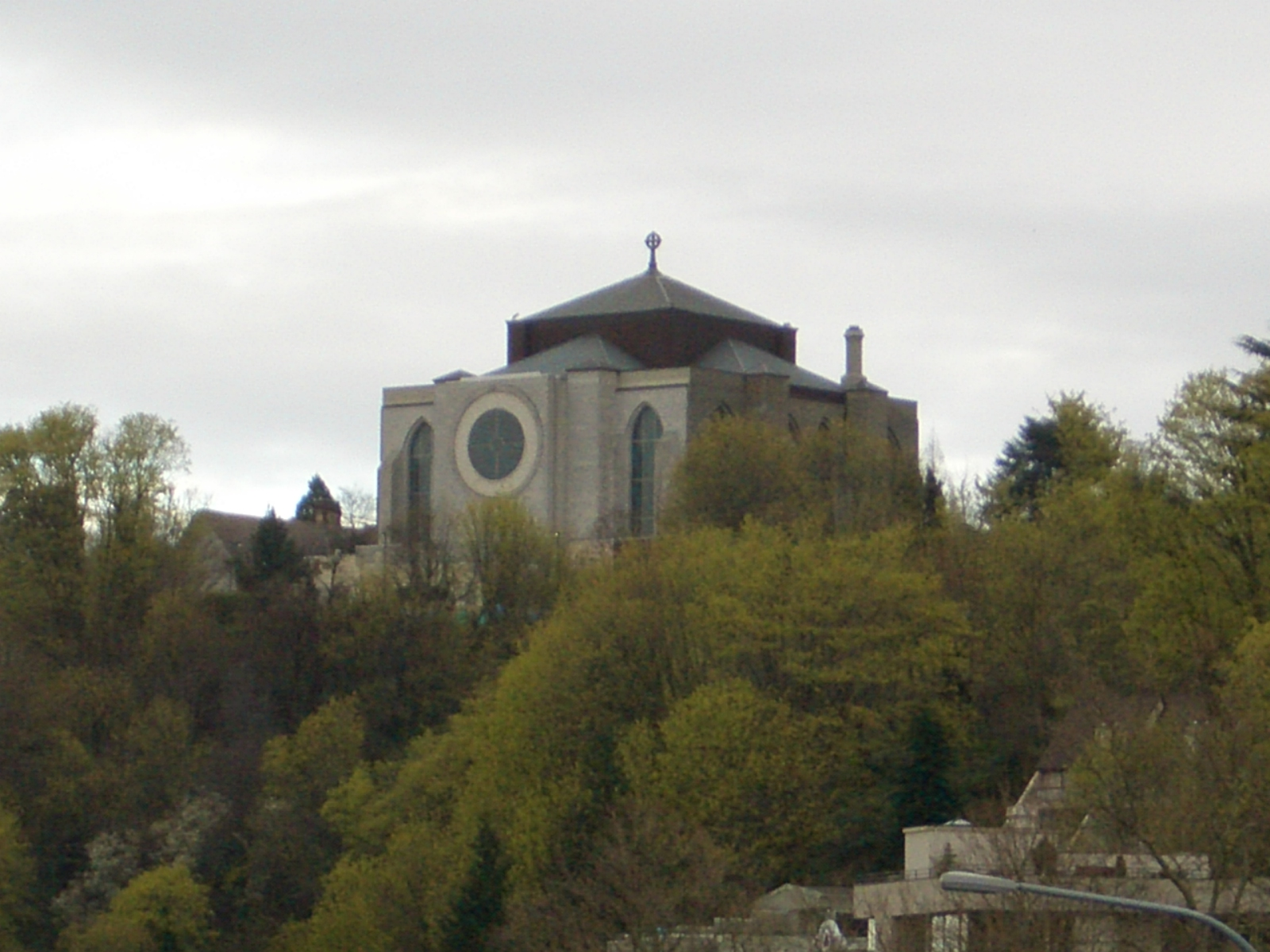
St. Mark's Episcopal Cathedral, Seattle

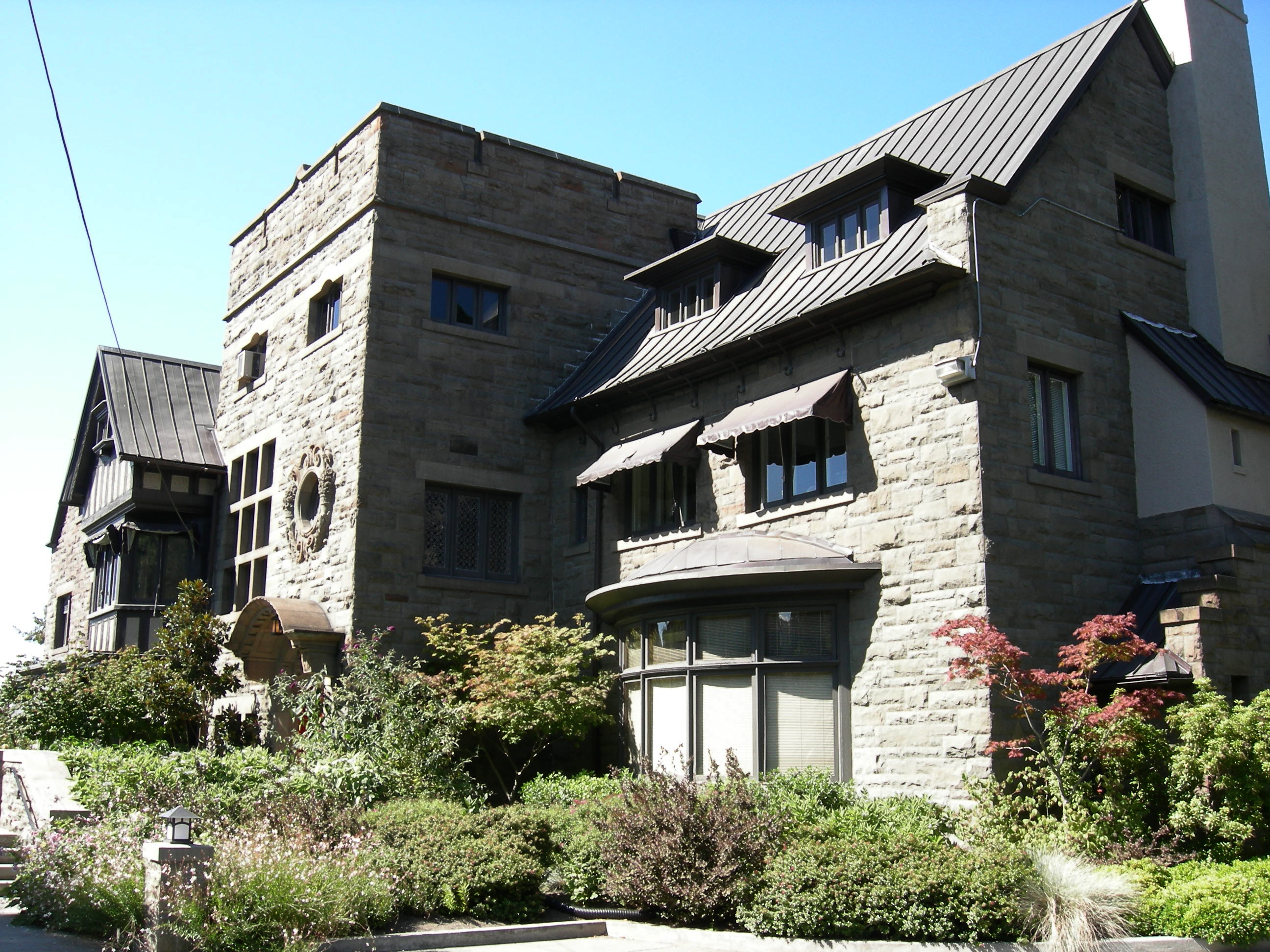
Eliza Ferry Leary House (a.k.a. Diocesan House), headquarters of the Episcopal Diocese of Olympia

These are the bishops who have served the territory now known as the Diocese of Olympia:

=== Missionary Bishops ===
==== Bishops of Oregon and Washington territories ====
1. Thomas Fielding Scott (1854–1867)
2. Benjamin Wistar Morris (1868–1880)

==== Bishops of Washington state ====
1. John A. Paddock (1880–1894)
2. William Morris Barker (1894–1901)
3. Frederick W. Keator (1902–1910)

=== Bishops of Olympia ===
1. Frederick W. Keator (1910–1924)
2. S. Arthur Huston (1925–1947)
3. Stephen F. Bayne, Jr. (1947–1960)
4. William F. Lewis (1960–1964)
5. Ivol Ira Curtis (1964–1976)
6. Robert H. Cochrane (1976–1989)
7. Vincent Waydell Warner, Jr. (1990–2007)
  • Sanford Zangwill Kaye Hampton, assisting bishop
  • Bavi Edna Rivera, bishop suffragan (2006–2009)
8. Gregory Rickel (2007–2022)
  • Melissa M. Skelton, bishop provisional (2023–2024)
9. Philip N. LaBelle (2024-present)

== Huston Camp and Conference Center ==
The Diocese owns a summer camp located in Gold Bar, Washington next to the Wallace Falls State Park.

== See also ==
- Historical list of bishops of the Episcopal Church in the United States of America
