= John Williams (bishop of Connecticut) =

American bishop

The Most Reverend John Williams
- 11th Presiding Bishop of the Episcopal Church
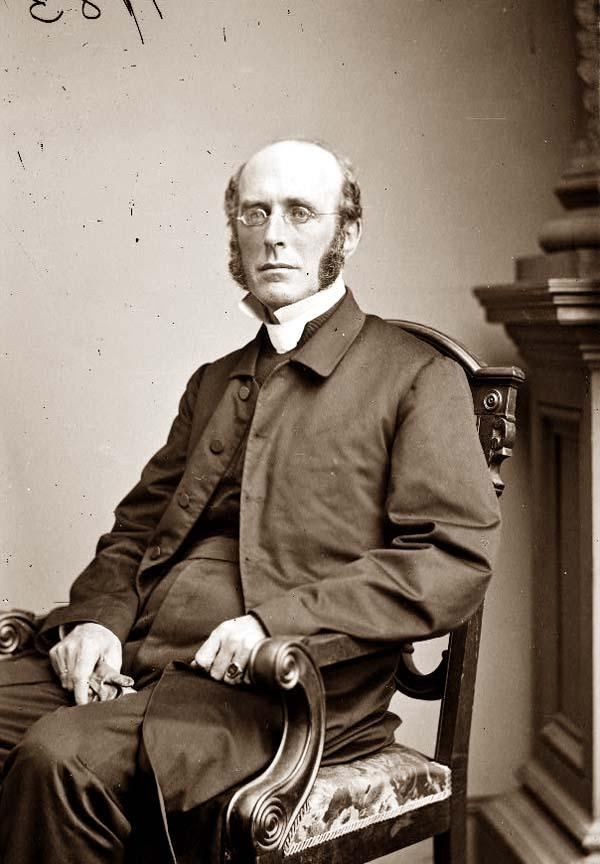
- Church: Episcopal Church
- In office: 1887–1889
- Predecessor: Alfred Lee
- Successor: Thomas M. Clark
- Other post: Bishop of Connecticut (1865–1899)
- Previous post: Assistant Bishop of Connecticut (1851-1865)

Orders
- Ordination: September 26, 1841 by Thomas Church Brownell
- Consecration: October 21, 1851 by Thomas Church Brownell

Personal details
- Born: August 30, 1817 Deerfield, Massachusetts, United States
- Died: February 7, 1899 (aged 81) Middletown, Connecticut, United States
- Buried: Indian Hill Cemetery
- Denomination: Anglican
- Parents: Ephraim Williams & Emily Trowbridge

John Williams (August 30, 1817 – February 7, 1899) was the fourth bishop of the Diocese of Connecticut and eleventh presiding bishop of the Protestant Episcopal Church in the United States of America.

== Early life ==
Williams was born at Deerfield, Massachusetts, the son of Ephraim Williams and Emily (Trowbridge) Williams. He was educated at Deerfield Academy, Harvard and at Trinity College, Hartford, where he graduated in 1835. Although his parents were Unitarian, Williams's time at Harvard convinced him to join the Protestant Episcopal Church. He was ordained deacon in 1838 and priest in 1841. Williams held the rectorship of St. George's Church, Schenectady, New York, from 1842 to 1848, after which he became president of Trinity College, and at the same time professor of history and literature there.

== Bishop of Connecticut ==
In 1851, Williams was elected Assistant Bishop of Connecticut. He was the 53rd bishop of the American Episcopalian succession, and was consecrated by Bishops Thomas Church Brownell, John Henry Hopkins, and William Heathcote DeLancey. In 1854, Williams founded Berkeley Divinity School at Middletown, and held the office of dean as well as being principal instructor in Church history and theology at the School. On the death of Bishop Brownell in 1865, Williams succeeded him in the sole charge of the diocese, remaining Dean of Berkeley Divinity School also.

== Presiding bishop ==
Williams succeeded Alfred Lee of Delaware as presiding bishop in 1887, and earned the reputation of a wise conservative leader in ecclesiastical affairs. In 1896, he was acknowledged as the senior bishop in the Anglican communion.

== Works ==
Among his published works are:

- Thoughts on the Gospel Miracles (1848)
- The English Reformation (Paddock Lectures, 1881)
- The World's Witness to Jesus Christ (Bedell Lectures, 1882)
- Studies in the Book of the Acts (1888)

== See also ==
- List of presiding bishops of the Episcopal Church in the United States of America
- Historical list of bishops of the Episcopal Church in the United States of America

== Notes ==
Episcopal Church (USA) titles
Preceded by Alfred Lee	11th Presiding Bishop; 1887–1899	Succeeded by Thomas M. Clark
Preceded by Thomas Church Brownell	4th Bishop of Connecticut; 1865–1899	Succeeded by Chauncey B. Brewster
