= List of Episcopal Divinity School people =

Faculty and alumni of the theological college in Massachusetts, United States

This is a partial list of notable people affiliated with Episcopal Divinity School, located in Cambridge, Massachusetts, United States, and with its predecessors, the Episcopal Theological School and the Philadelphia Divinity School.

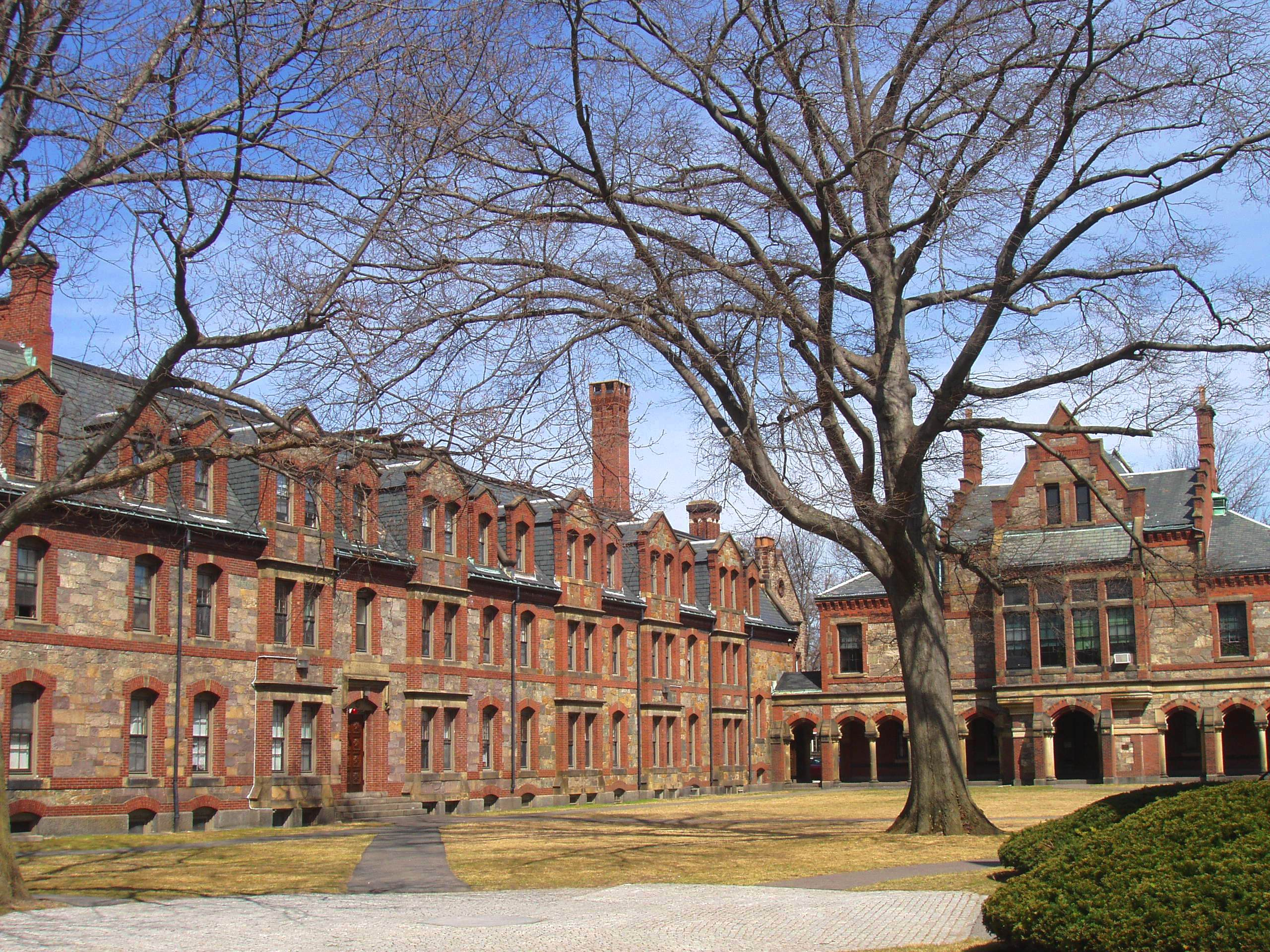
Episcopal Divinity School

== Faculty ==
- James Thayer Addison (1887–1953), Class of 1913, vice president of National Council of the Episcopal Church
- Alexander Viets Griswold Allen (1841–1908), church historian
- Nathan D. Baxter (born 1948), bishop of Central Pennsylvania
- Charles Bennison (born 1943), bishop of Pennsylvania
- Katie Geneva Cannon (born 1949), feminist theologian
- Otis Charles (1926–2013), dean, bishop of Utah
- Steven Charleston (born 1949), dean, bishop of Alaska
- John B. Coburn (1925–2006), dean, bishop of Massachusetts
- Frederick William Dillistone (1903–1993), theologian, dean of Liverpool
- Angus Dun (1892–1971), dean, bishop of Washington
- Elisabeth Schüssler Fiorenza (born 1938), feminist biblical scholar
- Joseph Fletcher (1905–1991), founder of situational ethics
- Ezra Palmer Gould (1841–1900), New Testament scholar (Philadelphia Divinity School)
- George Zabriskie Gray (1837–1889), dean
- Henry R. Gummey, liturgist
- Carter Heyward (born 1945), feminist theologian and one of the Philadelphia Eleven
- John Punnett Peters (1852–1921), Hebrew scholar (Philadelphia Divinity School)
- Katherine Hancock Ragsdale (born 1959), dean and president
- Francis Wharton (1820–1889), noted legal scholar and theologian

== Alumni ==
- George Councell (born 1949), bishop of New Jersey
- Peter Elliott (born 1954), dean, Christ Church Cathedral, Vancouver
- Philip Gambone (born 1948), author
- Mary Douglas Glasspool (born 1954), suffragan bishop in the Episcopal Diocese of Los Angeles
- Anna Greenwood-Lee, bishop of British Columbia
- John Guernsey (born 1953), bishop of the Anglican Diocese of the Mid-Atlantic
- James A. Kowalski (born 1951), dean of the Cathedral of Saint John the Divine, New York
- Bruce Lawrence (born 1941), scholar of religions
- Jeffrey Mello, bishop of Connecticut
- Robert Williams (1955–1992), gay priest

=== Episcopal Theological School ===
- Daniel Dulany Addison (1863–1936), priest, author
- John Melville Burgess (1909–2003), bishop of Massachusetts and the first African American to head an Episcopal diocese
- William Wilfred Campbell (1860–1918), Canadian poet
- Jonathan Daniels (1939–1965), civil rights martyr (died before graduation)
- Bob Franke (born 1947), singer-songwriter (left to pursue a musical career)
- Percy Stickney Grant (1860–1927), Christian socialist
- Alden Moinet Hathaway (born 1933), bishop of Pittsburgh
- Henry Hobson (1891–1983), bishop of Southern Ohio
- Arthur Lichtenberger (1900–1968), twenty-first presiding bishop of the Episcopal Church
- Mikael Mogren (born 1969), bishop of Västerås
- Arthur Moulton (1873–1962), bishop of Utah
- Endicott Peabody (1857–1944), priest, founder of Groton School
- James De Wolf Perry (1871–1947), eighteenth presiding bishop of the Episcopal Church
- William D. Persell (born 1943), bishop of Chicago, assisting bishop of Ohio
- George F. Regas (born 1930), priest, activist
- Logan Herbert Roots (1870–1945), bishop of Hankow
- Ruby Sales (born 1948), social activist
- Peter Selby (born 1941), bishop of Worcester
- Henry Knox Sherrill (1890–1980), twentieth presiding bishop of the Episcopal Church
- William B. Spofford (1921-2013), bishop of Eastern Oregon, assistant bishop of Washington
- Anson Phelps Stokes (1905–1986), bishop of Massachusetts
- William Greenough Thayer (1863–1934), priest, educator, headmaster of St. Mark's School
- Paul Van Buren (1924–1998), "Death of God" theologian
- Geralyn Wolf (born 1947), bishop of Rhode Island

=== Philadelphia Divinity School ===
- Allen W. Brown (1909–1990), bishop of Albany
- Wallace E. Conkling (1896–1979), bishop of Chicago
- William Chauncey Emhardt (1874–1950), priest and ecumenist
- Reginald H. Fuller (1915–2007), priest, biblical scholar
- Alfred A. Gilman (1878–1966), missionary bishop of Hankow
- Elwood Haines (1893–1949), bishop of Iowa
- Wilbur Hogg (1916–1986), bishop of Albany
- Francis Lickfield (1908–1998), bishop of Quincy
- Henry L. Phillips (1847–1947), rector of the Church of the Crucifixion in Philadelphia
- Lyman Pierson Powell (1866–1946), president of Hobart and William Smith Colleges
- Jules Louis Prevost (1863–1937), missionary to Alaska
- Theophilus Gould Steward (1843–1924), A.M.E. missionary, professor at Wilberforce University
- Paul Washington (1921–2002), priest and activist
- Arthur E. Woolley (1931-2021), priest, activist
