= Nedi Rivera =

American bishop

The Right Reverend Bavi Edna Rivera
- Bishop of Eastern Oregon
- Church: Episcopal Church
- Diocese: Eastern Oregon
- Elected: 2009
- In office: 2009–2016
- Predecessor: William O. Gregg
- Successor: Patrick W. Bell
- Other post: Suffragan Bishop of Olympia (2005–2010)

Orders
- Ordination: June 28, 1975 (deacon); May 5, 1979 (priest) by Chauncie Kilmer Myers, Bishop of California
- Consecration: January 22, 2005 by Harry Brown Bainbridge III

Personal details
- Born: Bavi Edna Rivera; March 24, 1946 (age 80) Visalia, California, United States
- Denomination: Anglican
- Parents: Victor Rivera & Barbara Ross Starbuck
- Spouse: Robert Moore (m. 1979)
- Children: 4
- Education: Wheaton College; Church Divinity School of the Pacific

Bavi Edna "Nedi" Rivera (born March 24, 1946) is a bishop of the Episcopal Church who served as a suffragan bishop in the Diocese of Olympia and as the Seventh Bishop of the Diocese of Eastern Oregon. She was the first Hispanic woman elected to become a bishop in the Episcopal Church. Her father, Victor Rivera, was also a bishop in the church.

== Early years ==
Rivera is one of three daughters born to a Puerto Rican father, Victor Rivera (an Episcopal priest and subsequently third bishop (1968–1988) of the Episcopal Diocese of San Joaquin, California) and an Anglo mother, Barbara Ross Starbuck. Rivera grew up in Visalia, California and went to an Episcopal convent boarding school in Tucson, Arizona. A nun at the convent advised her to attend Wheaton College in Massachusetts, believing that Rivera would like it there. At Wheaton she majored in Physics and also took calculus. In 1968, she earned a BA in physics and married six weeks after her graduation. Instead of pursuing a career in physics, she dedicated herself to her two daughters and two sons and volunteer work that included convening a youth group for church in her home and bookkeeping. Having divorced in 1976, she married another priest, Robert "Bob" Moore, on February 16, 1979. Both subsequently served at various churches in the dioceses of California and El Camino Real.

== Ordination ==
In 1972, Rivera learned at a meeting that the church was planning on ordaining women as priests. Being raised within the religious beliefs of the Episcopal Church served as an influential factor when she decided that she wanted to become a priest. However, one of the obstacles that she would have to face was convincing her father, at that time the Bishop of San Joaquin, and a staunch opponent of the ordination of women. In spite of his opposition, Rivera attended the seminary and was ordained a deacon on June 28, 1975. In 1976, she earned her Master of Divinity degree from the Church Divinity School of the Pacific (CDSP) in Berkeley, California. She was ordained to the priesthood by Bishop C. Kilmer Myers of California on May 5, 1979, becoming the first ordained woman of Latin American descent. Her father did not attend her ordination. She served as the Rector of St. George's Episcopal Church, Salinas, in the Diocese of El Camino Real, from 1984 to 1993. From 1994 to 2004, she served as rector of St. Aidan's Episcopal Church in San Francisco.

== First Hispanic woman consecrated bishop ==
Rivera was elected as a suffragan bishop in the Diocese of Olympia in 2004 and was consecrated bishop on January 22, 2005. She was the first Hispanic woman to become a bishop in the Episcopal Church. (She had to work hard to become conversant in Spanish (English was spoken at home) but now celebrates and preaches in Spanish.) It is a custom of the church that when a new bishop is ordained, the other bishops gather around the new bishop and lay their hands his/her head while the prayer of ordination is recited. Her father, who had a change of heart, was among the ordaining bishops present, and vested her with his own cope when she was vested as a bishop during the ceremony. In describing this moment Rivera said, “He didn't change his mind; he changed his heart.”

At the Diocese of Olympia, which is located in Seattle, Washington, she oversaw particular ministries, including evangelism, faith formation and ethnic ministries. As a member of the diocesan's "We Will Stand With You team", she provided the leadership and support for ongoing fund-raising to rebuild St. Paul's Episcopal Church and School in New Orleans that was devastated by Hurricane Katrina in 2005. She helped to start an initiative to get the diocese to buy 30,000 malaria nets to be distributed in African countries. On the occasion of her election and ordination as bishop, she received an honorary Doctor of Divinity degree from the Church Divinity School of the Pacific).

== Diocesan Bishop ==
Rivera stood unsuccessfully for election as the diocesan Bishop of Olympia in 2007 and remained in the position of bishop suffragan. In May 2009 she was elected as provisional bishop of the Diocese of Eastern Oregon. The position was part-time, initially held concurrently with her work in Olympia, from which she resigned in January 2010. In May 2009, she was elected bishop provisional of Eastern Oregon at a special diocesan convention following the 2007 resignation of their bishop diocesan. She was later designated seventh bishop of Eastern Oregon. She served as bishop diocesan until the consecration of her successor, Patrick W. Bell on April 16, 2016.

== Later life ==
Rivera gave her father’s episcopal ring to Bishop David Rice shortly before he was seated as the fourth bishop of the Episcopal Diocese of San Joaquin. Together with one of her sisters, she also returned to that diocese in 2017 to offer a present Episcopalians had given her father and mother, Barbara, when their father's 31-year episcopate ended in 1989. It was a quilt with panels from every congregation. Bishop Rivera served as the Bishop Protector of the Community of St. Francis (Province of the Americas), part of an international community of women in the Anglican Communion, who seek to live the Gospel life fervently in the Church and the world, after the example of St Francis of Assisi. Rivera also served as an assisting bishop in the Episcopal Diocese of Southern Ohio.

== See also ==
- List of Puerto Ricans
- History of women in Puerto Rico
