= Tsosie =

Tsosie is a surname, derived from the Navajo word tsʼósí, meaning "slender" or "slim" and may refer to:

- Ernie Tsosie, half of the Navajo comedy duo James & Ernie
- Krystal Tsosie, Navajo geneticist
- Leonard Tsosie (born 1955), American politician
- Myron Tsosie, American politician
- Rebecca Tsosie, American jurist
- Ellavina Tsosie Perkins (born 1940), Navajo linguist
- Steven Tsosie Plummer (1944-2005), first Navajo bishop of the Episcopal Church
- Frank Tsosie Thompson (1920-2008), Navajo code talker
