= Robert L. Paddock =

American bishop

The Right Reverend Robert Lewis Paddock
- Missionary Bishop of Eastern Oregon
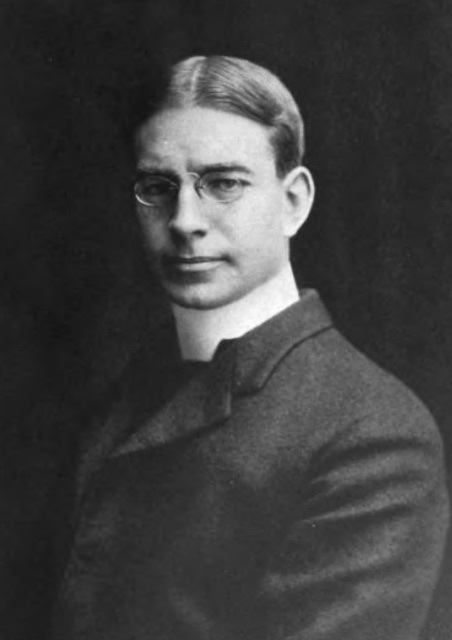
- Robert L. Paddock (January 1, 1913)
- Church: Episcopal Church
- See: Eastern Oregon
- Elected: 1907
- In office: 1907-1922
- Successor: William Remington

Orders
- Ordination: May 29, 1898 (priest) by William Andrew Leonard
- Consecration: December 18, 1907 by Daniel S. Tuttle

Personal details
- Born: December 24, 1869 New York City, New York, United States
- Died: May 17, 1939 (aged 69) New York City, New York, United States
- Denomination: Anglican
- Parents: John A. Paddock & Frances Chester Fanning
- Spouse: H. Jean Aitken (m. 1923; died 1938)

Robert Lewis Paddock (December 24, 1869 – May 17, 1939) was first bishop of the Episcopal Diocese of Eastern Oregon, serving from 1907 until his retirement in 1922.

== Early life and education ==
Paddock was born on December 24, 1869, in New York City to the Reverend John A. Paddock, later Bishop of Olympia, and Frances Chester Fanning. He was also the nephew of Benjamin Henry Paddock, Bishop of Massachusetts. He studied at Trinity College and graduated with a Bachelor of Arts in 1894, a Master of Arts in 1897, and was awarded an honorary Doctor of Sacred Theology in 1910. He also studied theology at the Berkeley Divinity School and graduated with a Bachelor of Divinity in 1897, and was awarded an honorary Doctor of Divinity in 1908. Hobart College also awarded him a Bachelor of Sacred Theology in 1908.

== Ordained ministry ==
Paddock was made deacon on June 1, 1897, by Bishop William Woodruff Niles of New Hampshire, at Trinity Church, Middletown, Connecticut. He then was in charge of St Paul's Mission in Southington, Connecticut, in 1897, and later became general secretary of the Church Students’ Missionary Association and assistant at St Paul’s Church in Cleveland, Ohio, between 1897 and 1898. While in Ohio he was ordained priest on May 29, 1898, by Bishop William Andrew Leonard of Ohio in St Paul’s Church. He then became vicar of the Stanton street mission, known as the Pro Cathedral in New York City, and was installed as a canon of the chapter of the Cathedral of St. John the Divine, where he remained until 1902. he later served as rector of the Church of the Holy Apostles in New York City from 1902 to 1907.

== Episcopacy ==
Paddock was elected by the House of Bishops on the third ballot to become the first Missionary Bishop of Eastern Oregon in 1907. He was consecrated on December 18, 1907, in the Church of the Holy Apostles with Presiding Bishop Daniel S. Tuttle as chief consecrator. He spent the next 15 years ministering in Eastern Oregon while promoting the bringing together of existing churches of various denominations rather than building new Episcopal churches. He was also quite unorthodox in relation to record keeping, reports, accounting, and secretaries, things which he deemed unimportant. Between 1918 and 1919 he took a short leave to minister in the YMCA in France. He retired in September 1922 due to poor health.

After his retirement he married H. Jean Aitken on January 9, 1923, who died on January 31, 1938. He died on May 17, 1939, at St. John's Episcopal Hospital in New York City, after being admitted on January 10. His funeral was held at the Church of the Holy Apostles officiated by Bishop Charles Kendall Gilbert. He was then cremated and his ashes scattered.
