= St. Peter's Episcopal Church (Seward, Alaska) =

Historic church in Alaska, United States

- U.S. National Register of Historic Places
- Alaska Heritage Resources Survey
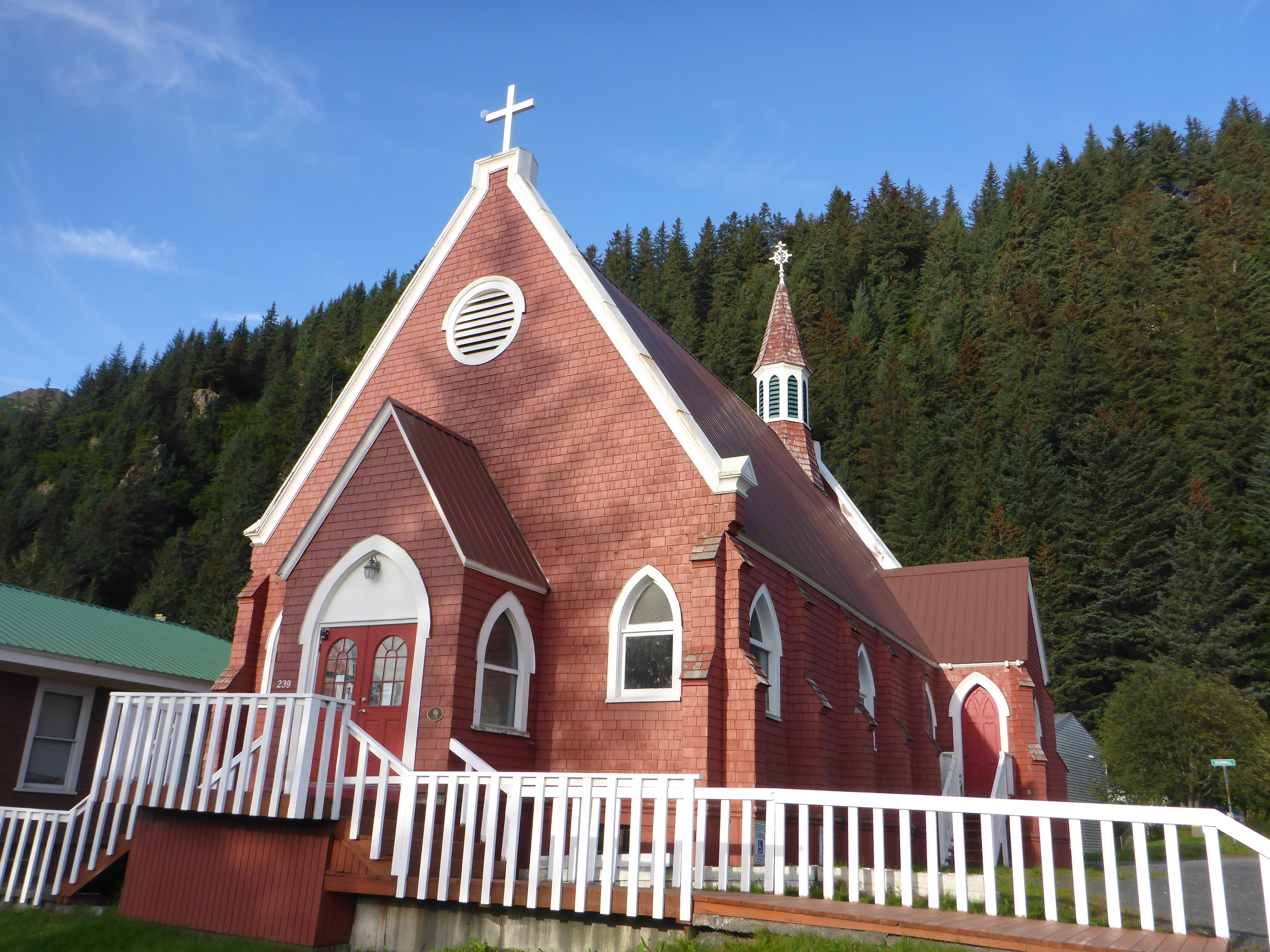

- Location within Alaska
- Location: 239 2nd Avenue, Seward, Alaska
- Coordinates: 60°6′10″N 149°26′39″W
- Area: less than one acre
- Built: 1904 (1905-1906 per church history)
- Built by: Rev. F.C. Taylor; Rev. George J. Zinn
- Architect: Frank L. Baker
- Architectural style: Bungalow/Craftsman
- NRHP reference No.: 79003762
- AHRS No.: SEW-028

Significant dates
- Added to NRHP: December 21, 1979
- Designated AHRS: June 10, 1972

St. Peter's Episcopal Church is a historic Episcopal church located at 239 Second Avenue at Adams Street in Seward, Alaska, United States. The first Episcopal services in Seward were held in 1904 by a priest from Valdez. The church building was constructed between 1905 and 1906 and was consecrated on April 1, 1906, by the Rt. Rev. Peter Trimble Rowe, the first bishop of the Episcopal Diocese of Alaska. The interior of the church is noted for the 1925 reredos of Christ's Resurrection and Ascension which was done by Dutch artist Jan Van Empel.

The church was added to the National Register of Historic Places in 1979.

The church reported 39 members in 2015 and two members in 2023; no membership statistics were reported in 2024 parochial reports. Plate and pledge income for the congregation in 2024 was $635.00 with average Sunday attendance (ASA) of four.

== See also ==
- National Register of Historic Places listings in Kenai Peninsula Borough, Alaska
