= Diocese of Alaska =

Diocese of Alaska may refer to the following ecclesiastical jurisdictions covering Alaska :

- Episcopal Diocese of Alaska
- Orthodox Church in America Diocese of Alaska
- Roman Catholic Diocese of Fairbanks, known prior to its elevation as the Apostolic Vicariate (initially Apostolic Prefecture) of Alaska
