= Frederick Putnam =

The Right Reverend Frederick Putnam
- Bishop of the Navajoland Area Mission
- Church: Episcopal Church
- See: Navajoland Area Mission
- In office: 1979-1982
- Successor: Steven T. Plummer
- Previous post: Suffragan Bishop of Oklahoma (1963-1979)

Orders
- Ordination: October 5, 1942 by Stephen Keeler
- Consecration: May 20, 1963 by Robert R. Brown

Personal details
- Born: June 17, 1917 Red Wing, Minnesota, United States
- Died: June 7, 2007 (aged 89) Edina, Minnesota, United States
- Denomination: Anglican
- Parents: Frederick Warren Putnam, Margaret Bunting
- Spouse: Helen Kathryn Prouse (m. 1942)
- Children: 3

Frederick Warren Putnam, Jr. (June 17, 1917 – June 7, 2007) was the first Episcopal bishop of the Navajoland Area Mission. He also served as Suffragan Bishop of Oklahoma and Assistant Bishop in Minnesota.

== Early life and education ==
Putnam was born on June 17, 1917, in Red Wing, Minnesota, to Frederick Warren Putnam and Margaret Bunting. He studied at the University of Minnesota and graduated with a Bachelor of Arts in 1939. He also earned a Bachelor of Divinity from Seabury-Western Theological Seminary in 1942, and was awarded an honorary Doctor of Divinity in 1963. He was also a postgraduate student at the Iowa State University between 1946 and 1947.

== Ordained ministry ==
Putnam was ordained deacon in March 1942 by Bishop Frank McElwain of Minnesota and priest on October 5, 1942, by Coadjutor Bishop Stephen Keeler of Minnesota at St Mark's Cathedral. He married Helen Kathryn Prouse on September 24, 1942, and together had three sons. He was priest-in-charge of the Church of the Good Shepherd in Windom, Minnesota and St John's Church in Worthington, Minnesota between 1942 and 1943, and then rector of Trinity Church in Iowa City, Iowa and chaplain at Iowa State University from 1943 to 1947. In 1947, he became rector of St Matthew's Church in Evanston, Illinois, while in 1960, he transferred to Wichita, Kansas to serve as rector of St James' Church, where he remained until 1963.

== Episcopacy ==
In November 1962, Putnam was elected Suffragan Bishop of Oklahoma and was consecrated bishop on May 20, 1963, at the Municipal Auditorium in Oklahoma City by Robert R. Brown of Arkansas. He remained in Oklahoma until 1979 when he was elected as the first resident bishop of the Navajoland Area Mission. He was installed on January 27, 1979. He strived to promote civil, women's, and Native American rights. He then retired in 1982 and served as Assistant Bishop in the Diocese of Minnesota. He died on June 7, 2007, in Edina, Minnesota.
