= St. Philip's Episcopal Church (Wrangell, Alaska) =

Historic church in Alaska, United States

- U.S. National Register of Historic Places
- Alaska Heritage Resources Survey
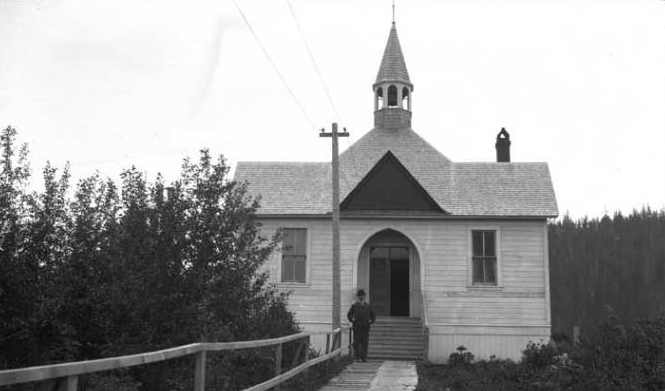
- The church in the late 19th or early 20th century

- Location within Alaska
- Location: 446 Church Street, Wrangell, Alaska
- Coordinates: 56°28′11″N 132°22′43″W
- Area: less than one acre
- Built: 1903
- Architect: Oscar Carlson, H.D. Campbell
- NRHP reference No.: 87000654
- AHRS No.: PET-315
- Added to NRHP: May 6, 1987

St. Philip's Episcopal Church is an historic Episcopal church located at 446 Church Street in Wrangell, Alaska, United States. Its frame vernacular-style church was built as the People's Church in 1903 by a Presbyterian congregation of Alaskan Natives under the direction of its minister, the Rev. Harry Prosper Corser. In 1905, Corser and many of his congregation were received into the Episcopal Church by the Rt. Rev. Peter Trimble Rowe, the first bishop of the Episcopal Diocese of Alaska. Corser was later ordained an Episcopal priest and served the church which was consecrated at St. Phillip's until he retired in 1934. On May 6, 1987, the church was added to the National Register of Historic Places as Saint Philip's Episcopal Church.

St. Philip's is an active parish in the Episcopal Diocese of Alaska. The Rev. Paula Sampson and the Rev. Ian MacKenzie are its co-rectors. The church reported 58 members in 2015 and 30 members in 2023; no membership statistics were reported in 2024 parochial reports. Plate and pledge income for the congregation in 2024 was $30,476 with average Sunday attendance (ASA) of 10.

== See also ==
- National Register of Historic Places listings in Wrangell, Alaska
