= John Boyd Bentley =

The Right Reverend John Boyd Bentley
- Bishop of Alaska
- Church: Episcopal Church
- Diocese: Alaska
- Elected: October 9, 1943
- In office: 1943–1948
- Predecessor: Peter Trimble Rowe
- Successor: William Gordon
- Previous post: Suffragan Bishop of Alaska (1931-1943)

Orders
- Ordination: June 1929 by Henry St. George Tucker
- Consecration: September 29, 1931 by James De Wolf Perry

Personal details
- Born: February 9, 1896 Hampton, Virginia, United States
- Died: June 12, 1989 (aged 93) Hampton, Virginia, United States
- Denomination: Anglican
- Parents: Charles Headley Bentley & Susan Elizabath Cake
- Spouse: Elvira Wenworth Carr (m. 1921)
- Education: College of William & Mary

John Boyd Bentley (February 9, 1896 – June 12, 1989) was the second bishop of the Episcopal Diocese of Alaska. He served as diocesan from 1943 to 1948.

== Early life and education ==
Bentley was born in Hampton, Virginia on February 9, 1896, to Charles Headley Bentley and Susan Elizabeth Cake. He was educated in Hampton High School and the United States Army Field Artillery School. He graduated from the College of William & Mary in 1919. He was awarded an honorary Doctorate in Divinity degree from Virginia Theological Seminary in 1932 and an honorary doctorate in Sacred Theology from the General Theological Seminary in 1948.

== Ordination ==
Bentley was ordained deacon in 1922 by Peter Trimble Rowe, the Bishop of Alaska. His first appointment was as a missionary at Christ Church in Anvik, Alaska where he served between 1921 and 1925. In 1926 he returned to Virginia and served as assistant at Bruton Parish Church. In June 1929 he was ordained priest by Henry St. George Tucker, Bishop of Virginia. He remained in Williamsburg until 1930 when he was appointed Archdeacon of the Yukon.

== Bishop ==
On September 25, 1931, he was elected Suffragan Bishop of Alaska by the House of Bishops in a session of the General Convention in Denver, Colorado. He was consecrated by Presiding Bishop James De Wolf Perry on September 29, 1931, in the Cathedral of St. John in the Wilderness in Denver, Colorado. His co-consecrators were Bishop Peter Trimble Rowe of Alaska and Bishop Arthur C. Thompson of Southern Virginia. He was presented by Bishop Henry St. George Tucker of Virginia and Bishop Robert Carter Jett of Southwestern Virginia. Upon Bishop Rowe's death in June 1942, Bentley was appointed as Bishop-in-charge until a successor could be elected. In 1943 he was elected as Rowe's successor. He remained Bishop of Alaska until 1948 when he was appointed vice president of the Episcopal Church Executive Council and director of the overseas department, a post he held until 1964.

== Personal life ==
Bentley married Elvira Wenworth Carr on May 29, 1921. He died in Hampton, Virginia in 1989.

== See also ==
- List of bishops of the Episcopal Church in the United States of America
