= Episcopal Diocese of Alaska =

Diocese of the Episcopal Church in the United States

Coordinates: 64°50′36.4″N 147°44′23.6″W

Diocese of Alaska Diœcesis Alaskensis

Location
- Country: United States
- Territory: Alaska
- Ecclesiastical province: Province VIII
- Deaneries: Arctic Coast, The Interior, South Central, Southeast
- Headquarters: Fairbanks, Alaska

Statistics
- Congregations: 43 (2024)
- Members: 4,794 (2023)

Information
- Denomination: Episcopal Church
- Established: 1971
- Cathedral: none

Current leadership
- Bishop: Mark Lattime

Map
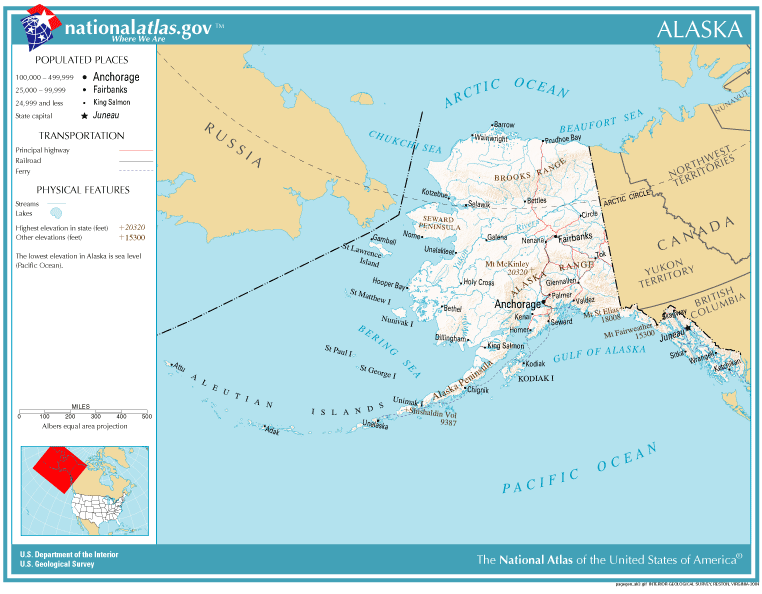
- Location of the Diocese of Alaska

Website
- episcopalak.org

The Episcopal Diocese of Alaska is the diocese of the Episcopal Church in the United States of America with jurisdiction over the state of Alaska. Established in 1895, it has the largest geographical reach of any diocese in the Episcopal Church, with under 5,000 members spread across 46 congregations. It is in Province 8. It has no cathedral and the diocesan offices are located in Fairbanks.

In 2024, the diocese reported average Sunday attendance (ASA) of 751 persons in a decrease from 1,491 in 2015. Plate and pledge income for 2024 was reported as $2,598,339. Public membership figures cited a decline in membership from 6,892 in 2015 to 4,794 in 2023. No membership statistics were reported in 2024 parochial reports.

== History ==
Canadian Anglican missionaries to the upper Yukon and Tanana first brought Anglicanism to Alaska. Missionaries from the Episcopal Church arrived in Anvik in 1887. The Reverend Octavius Parker from Oregon and the Reverend John Chapman from New York City founded Christ Church Mission on the lower Yukon River. Missionary work continued in 1890 when an Episcopal missionary doctor, John Driggs arrived in Point Hope on the Arctic Coast to start a school and to minister to the medical needs of the Iñupiat people. Driggs lived in Point Hope for 18 years. In 1895, the Reverend Peter Trimble Rowe was elected the first bishop of Alaska. He came into the country across the Chilkoot Trail focusing mostly on the medical needs of gold miners in the gold rush towns and on the Native people, who were falling prey to many diseases brought by the 'white man'. Consequently Bishop Rowe founded hospitals around the whole territory. The church also established boarding schools for orphaned Native children. In 1971 the Diocese of Alaska was established.

== Bishop of Alaska ==
Following the resignation in 2007 of Mark MacDonald, Bishop of Alaska, to become the first National Indigenous Bishop of the Anglican Church of Canada, the diocese embarked on a lengthy discernment process about its future leadership. Recognizing that the vacancy would likely be lengthy, the diocesan convention elected as assisting bishop, Rustin R. Kimsey, retired bishop of Eastern Oregon and former assisting bishop for Navajoland, to exercise episcopal functions pending the election and installation of a new diocesan bishop. In 2009, the diocese announced a process for election of the 8th bishop of Alaska, and the 35th Diocesan Convention, on April 10, 2010, elected Mark Lattime, Rector of St. Michael's Episcopal Church in Geneseo in the Diocese of Rochester (New York), as the 8th bishop of Alaska. His episcopal ordination took place on September 4, 2010, at the First United Methodist Church in Anchorage.

=== List of bishops ===
Bishops of Alaska
From	Until	Incumbent	Notes
1895	1942	Peter Trimble Rowe	Died in office
1943	1948	John Boyd Bentley	(February 9, 1896, Hampton, VA – June 12, 1989, Hampton); previously suffragan bishop.
1948	1974	William J. Gordon Jr.	Retired to Michigan as an honorary assistant bishop.
1974	1981	David Cochran	David Rea Cochran (April 9, 1915, Buffalo, NY – October 30, 2001)
1981	1991	George Clinton Harris	George Clinton Harris (December 19, 1925, Brooklyn, NY – May 7, 2000, Aberdeen, SD)
1991	1996	Steven Charleston	(born February 15, 1949, Duncan, OK); later Dean of the Episcopal Divinity School.
1997	2007	Mark MacDonald	Mark Lawrence MacDonald (born January 15, 1954); National Indigenous Bishop in Canada (2007–2022); assistant bishop in Navajoland (2007–2009).
2010	present	Mark Lattime	
Assistant bishops
1931	1942	John Boyd Bentley, suffragan bishop	Elected diocesan bishop.
2007	2015	Rustin R. Kimsey, assistant bishop	Rustin Ray Kimsey (born 20 June 1935, Bend, OR); retired from Eastern Oregon; previously assistant in Navajoland.

== Resolutions of the 2007 Diocesan Convention ==
The 33rd Convention of the Episcopal Diocese of Alaska, held in 2007, adopted several resolutions that may, in due course, markedly influence the ministry of the diocese. These resolutions included:

=== Resolution 2007–01 – Indigenous Suffragan ===
- Therefore, be it resolved that the 33rd Convention of the Diocese of Alaska supports the Interior Deanery in calling upon the next Bishop of Alaska to call for the election of an Indigenous Suffragan Bishop to serve the Native peoples of Alaska within eighteen months of consecration. Be it further resolved that the Indigenous Suffragan Bishop will provide pastoral and spiritual care for our Indigenous Congregations.

=== Resolution 2007–02 – Suffragan Bishop Task Force ===
- The 33rd Convention of the Episcopal Diocese of Alaska encourages our next Diocesan Bishop to consider a Suffragan bishop for Indigenous Ministries. Be it further resolved The 33rd Convention of the Episcopal Diocese of Alaska establish immediately a Suffragan Bishop’s Task Force to develop a plan for implementation of this resolution, to be acted upon by our newly elected Diocesan Bishop, within 12 months of his or her consecration.

== Historic parish churches ==
Several parish churches are listed on the National Register of Historic Places:

- Holy Trinity Church (Juneau, Alaska)
- St. Peter's Episcopal Church (Seward, Alaska)
- St. Philip's Episcopal Church (Wrangell, Alaska)
- St. Peter's by-the-Sea Episcopal (Sitka, Alaska)
- St. Peter's Episcopal Church (Seward, Alaska)

== See also ==
- List of bishops of the Episcopal Church in the United States of America
