= David Earle Bailey =

American Episcopalian bishop (1940–2024)

The Right Reverend David Earle Bailey
- III Bishop of Navajoland
- Church: Episcopal Church
- Diocese: Navajoland
- Elected: March 24, 2010
- Previous posts: Canon to the Ordinary, Episcopal Diocese of Utah; Rector, St Stephen's Episcopal Church, Phoenix, Arizona

Orders
- Ordination: February 10, 1980
- Consecration: August 7, 2010

Personal details
- Born: March 30, 1940 Canton, Ohio, U.S.
- Died: July 28, 2024 (aged 84)
- Education: Episcopal Seminary of the Southwest

David Earle Bailey (March 30, 1940 – July 28, 2024) was an American Episcopalian clergyman who was bishop of the Missionary Diocese of Navajoland, a missionary diocese of the Episcopal Church. He was consecrated bishop on August 7, 2010.

Bailey was ordained to the priesthood in 1980 and received an MDiv from the Episcopal Seminary of the Southwest. He had previously served as rector of St. Stephen's Episcopal Church in Phoenix, Arizona, and as canon to the ordinary and development director in the Episcopal Diocese of Utah. He was a member of Bishops Against Gun Violence.

Consecrated bishop at age 70, he was the second oldest person to be made a bishop in the Episcopal Church and the first septuagenarian since the eighteenth-century.

Bailey died on July 28, 2024, at the age of 84.
