= William Gordon (bishop of Alaska) =

American Episcopal bishop

The Right Reverend William J. Gordon Jr.
- Bishop of Alaska
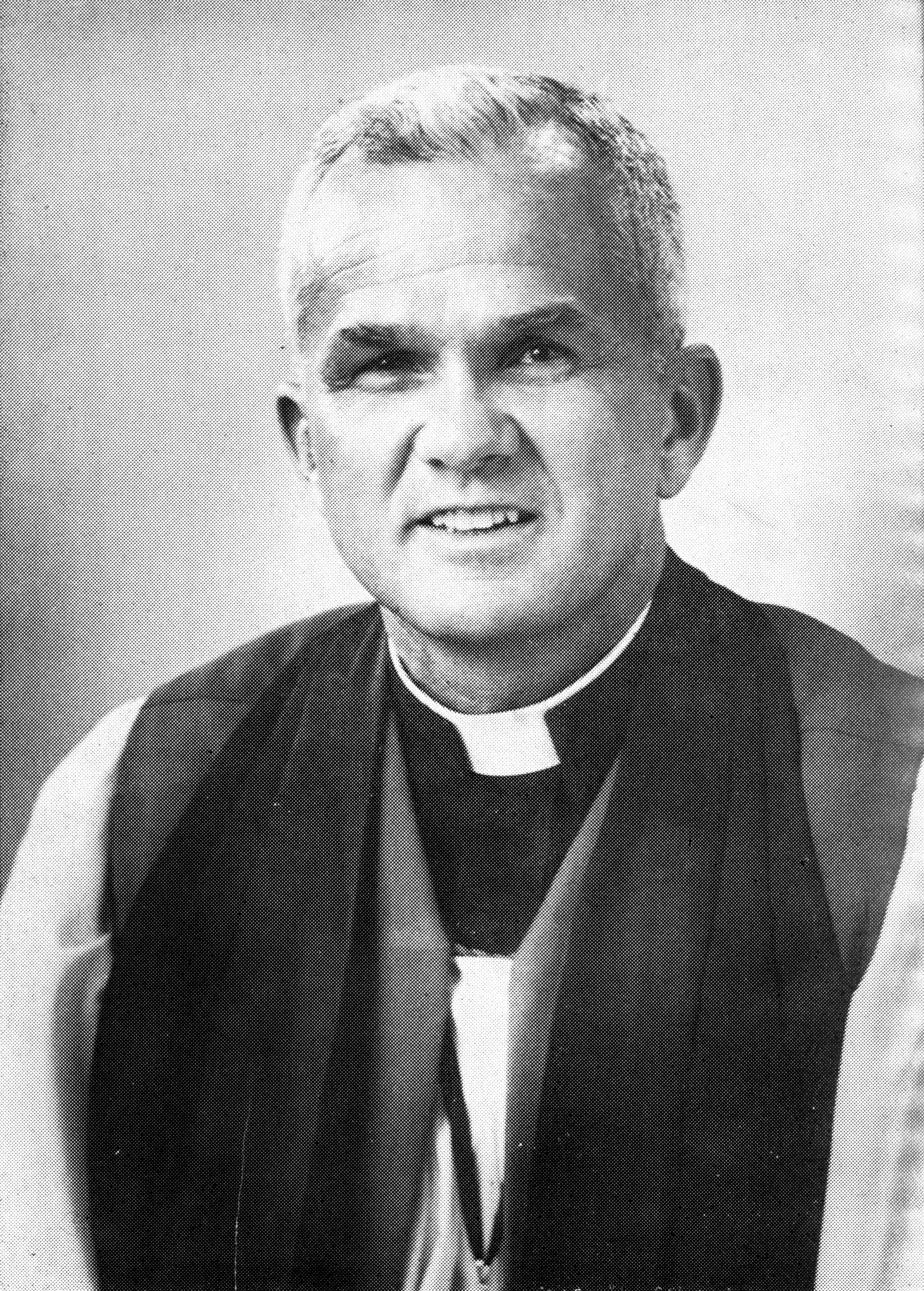
- Church: Episcopal Church
- Diocese: Alaska
- In office: 1948–1974
- Predecessor: John Boyd Bentley
- Successor: David Cochran
- Other post: Assistant Bishop of Michigan (1976–1986)

Orders
- Ordination: July 25, 1943 by John Boyd Bentley
- Consecration: May 18, 1948 by Henry Knox Sherrill

Personal details
- Born: May 6, 1918 Spray, North Carolina, United States
- Died: January 4, 1994 (aged 75) Midland, Michigan, United States
- Buried: Overlook Cemetery, Eden, North Carolina
- Denomination: Anglican
- Parents: William Jones Gordon & Anna Barrow Clark
- Spouse: Shirley Lewis (m. 1943)
- Children: 4
- Education: University of North Carolina

William Jones Gordon Jr. (May 6, 1918 - January 4, 1994) was bishop of the Episcopal Diocese of Alaska from 1948 to 1974 and was known as the "Flying Bishop of Alaska" for his ministry of flying his own plane across the vast diocese.

== Early life and education ==
Gordon was born on May 6, 1918, in Spray, North Carolina to the Reverend William Jones Gordon and Anna Barrow Clark. He studied at the University of North Carolina and graduated with a Bachelor of Arts in 1940. He attended Virginia Theological Seminary and earned a Bachelor of Divinity in 1943.

== Career ==
He was ordained deacon on January 24, 1943. Invited to Alaska by Bishop John B. Bentley in 1943, he served five years as missionary-in-charge on the Arctic Coast, mostly in Point Hope, Alaska. He was ordained priest by Bishop Bentley on July 25, 1943, in St Mark's Church in Nenana, Alaska. Gordon was consecrated bishop of Alaska on 18 May 1948 in the Church of the Good Shepherd, Raleigh, North Carolina by 13 bishops of the Episcopal Church. Among them was his predecessor, Bishop Bentley, Bishop Edwin A. Penick of North Carolina and Presiding Bishop Henry Knox Sherrill who served as chief consecrator.

Before earning his pilot's license in 1949, Gordon had traveled about 6,000 miles by dogsled to minister to villages along Alaska's Arctic Sea coast. After returning to the state as a bishop but before earning his wings, Gordon visited all of the churches in his diocese on a three-month, 3,500-mile trip by boat. After earning his wings, Gordon logged over 1 million miles on a small plane purchased by the church for him to visit his flock.

He retired in 1974 and later served as assistant bishop of the Episcopal Diocese of Michigan. Gordon died in Midland, Michigan, in 1994.

In order to continue Gordon's ministry, the Diocese of Alaska founded the Wings of the Spirit Transportation Endowment in 1992 as a non-profit corporation.

== References and external links ==
- The Episcopal Church Annual -Morehouse Publishing
- The Episcopal Church

Specific

Episcopal Church (USA) titles
| Preceded by John Boyd Bentley | Bishop of Alaska; 1948 – 1974 | Succeeded by David Cochran |
