= Victor Rivera (bishop) =

Puerto Rican Episcopalian priest and bishop

The Right Reverend Victor Manuel Rivera
- Bishop of San Joaquin
- Province: Episcopal Church in the United States
- Diocese: San Joaquin
- Installed: 1968
- Term ended: 1989
- Predecessor: Sumner F. D. Walters
- Successor: John-David Schofield

Orders
- Ordination: 1944
- Consecration: 1968

Personal details
- Born: 1916 Peñuelas, Puerto Rico
- Died: December 23, 2005 (aged 88–89) Orinda, California
- Spouse: Barbara Ross Lamb
- Children: Nedi Rivera
- Education: Church Divinity School of the Pacific

Victor Manuel Rivera (1916 – December 24, 2005) was a Puerto Rican Episcopalian priest and bishop. He served from 1968 to 1989 as the third bishop of the Episcopal Diocese of San Joaquin.

== Education and early career ==
Rivera was born in Penuelas, Puerto Rico, where his father and four uncles were Episcopal priests. In 1944, he graduated from the Church Divinity School of the Pacific in Berkeley, California, and was ordained to the priesthood. From 1943 to 1944 he was vicar of Grace Church in Martinez, California, and from 1945 to 1968, he was rector of St. Paul's Episcopal Church, Visalia, California. He also held diocesan offices in the Diocese of San Joaquin.

== Episcopacy ==
In 1968, Rivera was elected third bishop of the Diocese of San Joaquin. He served until his retirement in January 1989, shortly after reaching the mandatory retirement age of 72. He was succeeded by bishop coadjutor John-David Schofield, who had been elected in the fall of 1988.

By the end of Rivera's episcopacy, the Diocese of San Joaquin was one of only six in the Episcopal Church that had not ordained any women to the priesthood. Rivera opposed the ordination of women and sexually active homosexuals during his episcopacy, describing his diocese as "not willing to do away with biblical teachings and the beliefs of the church." When his daughter Nedi was ordained to the Episcopalian priesthood in 1976, Rivera did not attend her ordination service.

== Later life ==
Rivera is reported to have changed his mind on women's ordination after his retirement as bishop, as he participated with approval in the consecration of Nedi Rivera as bishop suffragan in the Episcopal Diocese of Olympia.

Rivera's wife, Barbara, died in April 2005, and he died eight months later on December 23 in Orinda, California.

Anglican Communion titles
Preceded by Sumner F. D. Walters	Episcopal Bishop of San Joaquin; 1968–1989	Succeeded by John-David Schofield
