= Missionary Diocese of Navajoland =

Missionary Diocese of the Episcopal Church in the United States

Coordinates: 36.7152°N 108.2281°W

Diocese of Missionary Diocese of Navajoland

Location
- Country: United States
- Ecclesiastical province: Province VIII

Statistics
- Congregations: 10 (2025)
- Members: 556 (2025)

Information
- Denomination: Episcopalian
- Cathedral: None
- Language: English, Diné

Current leadership
- Bishop: Vacant (Note: As of 2026, the diocese's Standing Committee is its ecclesiastical authority.)

Map
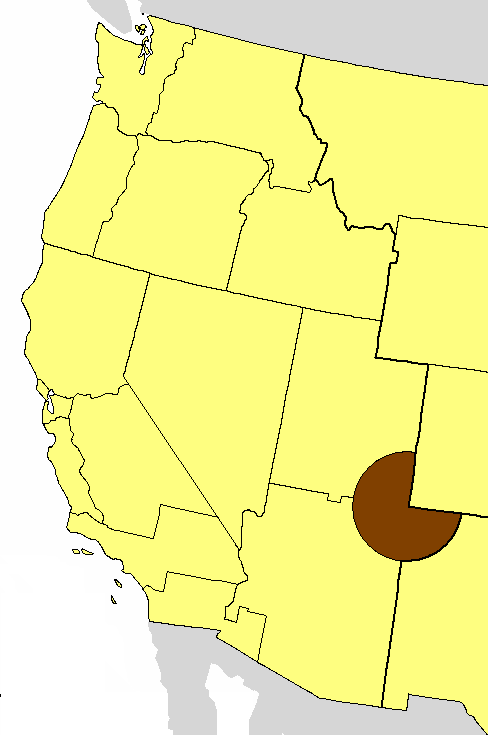
- Location of the Missionary Diocese of Navajoland

Website
- ecofnavajoland.org

The Missionary Diocese of Navajoland, also known as the Episcopal Church in Navajoland, is a Missionary Diocese of the Episcopal Church in the United States of America. It is in Province 8 of the Episcopal Church and its diocesan offices are located in Farmington, New Mexico.

In 2025, the diocese reported average Sunday attendance (ASA) of 112 persons, a relative decrease from 201 ASA in 2016. Between 2023 and 2025, reported membership decreased from 800 persons to 556. The 10 congregations of the diocese had $77,670 in plate and pledge income in 2025.

== Establishment and history ==
Created by General Convention in 1978 as the Navajoland Area Mission, the Missionary Diocese of Navajoland comprises portions of the Navajo Reservation as well as parts of Arizona, New Mexico and Utah (see map). Its missionary status provides the diocese with more oversight from the Office of the Presiding Bishop and the House of Bishops. Prior to its creation, the Church's ministry to the Navajo people was overseen jointly by the three Episcopal dioceses of the Rio Grande, Arizona and Utah.

The first full-time appointment to Navajoland was Frederick W. "Fred" Putnam, Suffragan Bishop of the Episcopal Diocese of Oklahoma since 1963. He commenced in January 1979 and served until his retirement in January 1983. Although 61 at the time of his appointment, he came to the Mission with a strong sense of purpose and focus on the building up of indigenous ministry.

The Presiding Bishop then appointed Wesley Frensdorff, Bishop of Nevada until January 1985 and subsequently Assisting Bishop in the Episcopal Diocese of Arizona, as Assisting Bishop. Bishop Frensdorff held the position in Navajoland concurrently with his other appointments. Following Bishop Frensdorff's death in a plane accident in May 1988, the Presiding Bishop appointed William "Dub" Wolfrum, Suffragan Bishop of Colorado, as interim bishop. He served until March 1990.

Steven Plummer was consecrated in March 1990. He was the first elected bishop, and the first indigenous appointee to the position. Bishop Plummer took a leave of absence from May 1993 to April 1994 following revelations of sexual misconduct in the 1980s. During his leave of absence, William Wantland, Bishop of the Diocese of Eau Claire, served as Interim Bishop. Bishop Plummer, who is widely regarded as having brought stability to the Mission and having moved it along a path of self-determination, died in April 2005 following a long battle with cancer. Rustin Kimsey, retired Bishop of Eastern Oregon, was appointed Assisting Bishop and served from June 2005 to July 2006.

Mark MacDonald was appointed Assisting Bishop in July 2006. MacDonald had been appointed earlier in the year, and subsequent to accepting the position was invited to serve as National Indigenous Bishop for the Anglican Church of Canada. He served in both positions until September 2009, when he resigned as Bishop of Navajoland to focus on his work in Canada.

A special convocation of the Episcopal Church in Navajoland on October 17, 2009, elected Canon David Bailey, at that time Canon to the Ordinary and Development Officer in the Diocese of Utah, as Interim Canon to the Ordinary for the Navajoland Area Mission, pending the election by the Episcopal Church's House of Bishops of the next Bishop of Navajoland. (The unusual election process relates to Navajoland's status as an area mission.) He was subsequently elected on 24 March 2010, and ordained to the episcopate on 7 August 2010. He served until his resignation on 19 May 2023. The Right Rev. Barry L. Beisner succeeded him as Bishop Provisional on 12 March 2023 until his resignation on 21 June 2026, leaving the diocese to be led by its standing committee.

In 2024, the General Convention of the Episcopal Church approved a request to make Navajoland a Missionary Diocese, a status that became official on 24 June 2025. The diocese is working to elect a bishop. In 2025, the diocese planned for a tentative consecration date of 9 May 2026. The list of nominees was approved on 6 November 2025 with a planned election date on 3 January 2026. This election was postponed to June 2026 in a 15 December 2026 statement by the diocese. The Rev. Alyssa Stebbing—one of the candidates and rector of St. Christopher’s Episcopal Church in Austin, Texas—withdrew on 19 December 2025 due to concerns that the delay would strain her congregation, leaving only the Rev. Leon Sampson and the Rev. Cornelia Eaton. The diocese announced on 11 June 2026 that the election, then scheduled for 13 June, would again be postponed to an unspecified point in the future.

== Bishops ==
1. The Right Rev. Frederick Warren Putnam (1979–1982)
  * The Right Rev. Wesley Frensdorff (Assisting Bishop, 1983–1988)
  * The Right Rev. William H. Wolfrum (Interim Bishop, 1988–1990)
2. The Right Rev. Steven Tsosie Plummer (1990–2005)
  * The Right Rev. William C. Wantland (Interim Bishop, 1993–1994)
  * The Right Rev. Rustin Ray Kimsey (Assisting Bishop, 2005–2007)
  * The Right Rev. Mark Lawrence MacDonald (Assisting Bishop, 2007–2009)
3. The Right Rev. David Earle Bailey (2010–2023)
  * The Right Rev. Barry Leigh Beisner (Bishop Provisional, 2023–2026)
