= Lane W. Barton =

American bishop in The Episcopal Church

The Right Reverend Lane W. Barton
- Missionary Bishop of Eastern Oregon
- Church: Episcopal Church
- See: Eastern Oregon
- Elected: September 17, 1946
- In office: 1946–1968
- Predecessor: William Remington
- Successor: William B. Spofford

Orders
- Ordination: June 1924 (deacon); June 1925 (priest) by William Andrew Leonard
- Consecration: November 26, 1946 by Henry St. George Tucker

Personal details
- Born: June 3, 1899 Norwalk, Ohio, United States
- Died: January 5, 1997 (aged 97) Vancouver, Washington, United States
- Denomination: Anglican
- Parents: Charles Edwin Barton & Clara Wickham
- Spouse: Mary Addison Simpson (m. 1924)
- Children: 4

Lane Wickham Barton (June 3, 1899 – January 5, 1997) was a bishop in The Episcopal Church, serving in Eastern Oregon from 1946 to 1968.

== Early life and education ==
Barton was born in Norwalk, Ohio, on June 3, 1899, to Charles Edwin Barton and Clara Wickham. He initially studied at the Ohio State University until 1921 but later transferred to Kenyon College from where he graduated with a Bachelor of Arts in 1923. He then attended Bexley Hall from where he earned a Bachelor of Divinity in 1924 and was rewarded a Doctor of Divinity in 1948. He married Mary Addison Simpson on July 12, 1924, and together had two daughters and two sons.

== Ordained ministry ==
Barton was ordained deacon in June 1924 and priest in June 1925 by Bishop William Andrew Leonard of Ohio. He initially served as minister-in-charge of St Mark's Church in Shelby, Ohio, from 1922 until 1927. He then became rector of Trinity Church in Newark, Ohio, while in 1931 he became rector of St Paul's Church in Flint, Michigan. From 1938 till 1946 he was also rector of Grace Church in Orange, New Jersey.

== Episcopacy ==
Barton was elected Missionary Bishop of Eastern Oregon at the meeting of the House of Bishops in Philadelphia on September 17, 1946. He was then consecrated at St Paul's Church in Norwalk, Ohio, on November 26, 1946, by Presiding Bishop Henry St. George Tucker. During his episcopacy the missionary district experienced an increase in the number of communicants and established ties with the Diocese of Mashonaland in present-day Zimbabwe. He has also been refed to as a laymen's bishop due to his promotion of evangelism by the laity. He retired on October 1, 1968.
