= Cambridge Accord =

LGBTQ rights in the Anglican Communion

The Cambridge Accord was an attempt to reach agreement on at least the human rights of homosexual people, notwithstanding controversy within the Anglican Communion about Anglican views of homosexuality.

It was published in the wake of the controversial Resolution 1.10 passed at the Lambeth Conference of 1998, which stated that "homosexual practice" is "incompatible with Scripture". The Cambridge Accord was published in October 1999 from the Episcopal Divinity School at Cambridge, Massachusetts and circulated for adoption by bishops of the Anglican Communion.

The Cambridge Accord proposed that:

In the name of God, we, the bishops of the Anglican Communion who have affixed our names to this Accord, publish it as a statement of our shared opinion in regard to all persons who are homosexual. We affirm that while we may have contrasting views on the Biblical, theological, and moral issues surrounding homosexuality, on these three points we are in one Accord:

- That no homosexual person should ever be deprived of liberty, personal property, or civil rights because of his or her sexual orientation.
- That all acts of violence, oppression, and degradation against homosexual persons are wrong and cannot be sanctioned by an appeal to the Christian faith.
- That every human being is created equal in the eyes of God and therefore deserves to be treated with dignity and respect.

We appeal to people of good conscience from every nation and religious creed to join us in embracing this simple Accord as our global claim to human rights not only for homosexual men and women, but for all God's people.

Its author was the Right Reverend Steven Charleston, President and Dean of the Episcopal Divinity School, Cambridge, Massachusetts.

== Signatories ==
Nineteen Anglican bishops in the UK signed up to the Cambridge Accord, including Rowan Williams, who later became Archbishop of Canterbury.

Four bishops in the UK expressly declined to sign: George Carey, who was Archbishop of Canterbury at the time of Lambeth Resolution 1.10 in 1998 and at the time of the Cambridge Accord itself; David Hope, who was then Archbishop of York and was alleged to be gay in 1995 by an OutRage! outing campaign; the Anglo-Catholic Eric Kemp; and John Sentamu, who later became Archbishop of York.
