= Warren Lincoln Rogers =

American bishop (1877–1938)

The Right Reverend Warren Lincoln Rogers D.D., S.T.D.
- Bishop of Ohio
- Church: Episcopal Church
- Diocese: Ohio
- Elected: January 27, 1925
- In office: 1930–1938
- Predecessor: William Andrew Leonard
- Successor: Beverley Dandridge Tucker
- Previous post: Coadjutor Bishop of Ohio (1925–1930)

Orders
- Ordination: December 20, 1911 by Charles D. Williams
- Consecration: April 30, 1925 by William Andrew Leonard

Personal details
- Born: November 14, 1877 Allentown, New Jersey, U.S.
- Died: November 6, 1938 (aged 60) Mount Vernon, Ohio, U.S.
- Buried: Woodlawn Cemetery, Detroit
- Denomination: Anglican
- Parents: Samuel Hartshorne Rogers & Josephine Lincoln
- Spouse: Helen Clingen Speakman (m. 1911; died 1919)
- Education: University of Michigan

Warren Lincoln Rogers (November 14, 1877 – November 6, 1938) was bishop of the Episcopal Diocese of Ohio from 1930 to 1938; he had served previously as coadjutor from 1925 to 1930. The Wa-Li-Ro Episcopal Choir Camp was named for him.

== Early life and education ==
Rogers was born on November 14, 1877, in Allentown, New Jersey, the son of Samuel Hartshorne Rogers (1852-1922) and Josephine Lincoln (1849-1887). He was a descendant of President Abraham Lincoln. He received his early education at the Central High School in Detroit. He joined the Episcopal Church while studying at the University of Michigan, from which he graduated with a Bachelor of Arts in 1907. He also attended the Union Theological Seminary (1911) and then the General Theological Seminary (1912) from where he earned a Bachelor of Divinity. He was awarded an honorary Doctor of Divinity from Kenyon College in 1925, and another from the University of the South. On June 29, 1911, Rogers married Helen "Nelly" Clingen Speakman (1878-1919) in St Paul's Cathedral. He also received an honorary Doctor of Sacred Theology from Columbia University.

== Ordained ministry ==
Rogers was made deacon in June 1911, and ordained priest on December 20, 1911, on both occasions by Bishop Charles D. Williams of Michigan, in St Paul's Cathedral. He was assigned to serve as rector of St Thomas Church in Detroit in 1911, while in 1913, he became the associate rector of Calvary Church in Pittsburgh, Pennsylvania. Between 1916 and 1920, he served as rector of St John's Church in Jersey City, New Jersey, before becoming the Dean of St Paul's Cathedral, Detroit, in 1920, where he remained until 1925. While at St Paul's he was the first to install microphones in the church and was the first clergyman in the country to broadcast a sermon live on radio, which prompted him to be called the Radio Dean.

== Bishop ==
On January 27, 1925, during a special convention of the Diocese of Ohio, Rogers was elected Coadjutor Bishop of Ohio. He was then consecrated on April 30, 1925, in St Paul's Cathedral, Detroit, by the Bishop of Ohio William Andrew Leonard. He succeeded as diocesan on September 21, 1930. He was bishop during the time of the Great Depression, which caused him to cut his salary in half, subjected all other diocesan salaries to 3-month reviews and adjustment, and gave up the bishop's residence, which was then used as a children's shelter. Rogers resigned in October 1938 due to ill health, and died, after suffering a stroke, a month later on November 6, in a hospital in Mount Vernon, Ohio.
