= George Clinton Harris =

The Right Reverend George Clinton Harris
- Bishop of Alaska
- Church: Episcopal Church
- Diocese: Alaska
- Elected: November 21, 1980
- In office: 1981–1991
- Predecessor: David Cochran
- Successor: Steven Charleston

Orders
- Ordination: December 1953
- Consecration: June 7, 1981 by John Allin

Personal details
- Born: December 19, 1925 Brooklyn, New York City, New York, United States
- Died: May 7, 2000 (aged 74) Aberdeen, South Dakota, United States
- Denomination: Anglican
- Spouse: Mary Jane Shotwell Harris
- Children: 6
- Education: Rutgers University

George Clinton Harris (December 19, 1925 – May 7, 2000) was bishop of the Episcopal Diocese of Alaska from 1981 to 1991.

== Biography ==
George Clinton Harris was born on December 19, 1925, in Brooklyn, New York City to Clinton George Harris and Meta Grace Werner. Harris graduated with a B.S. in Civil Engineering from Rutgers University in 1950 and with a Master of Sacred Theology from the General Theological Seminary in 1953. He was ordained deacon in May 1953 and a priest in December of the same year. On June 27, 1953, he married Mary Jane Shotwell, with whom he had 6 children.

His first assignment was as curate of the Church of the Heavenly Rest in New York City which he served between 1953 and 1955. Starting in 1955 he served as an assistant at Epiphany Church, Baguio City, Philippines and starting in 1957 as priest-in-charge at St. Mary the Virgin Church, Sagada, Philippines, until 1962. He was on sabbatical at Hartford Seminary until 1963. He returned to the Philippines in 1963 and served as Principal of St. Francis High School in Upi in Mindanao until 1969. In 1970 he became rector of the four-church Lower Luzerne Parish in Hazleton, Pennsylvania. In 1974 he was appointed director of the Dakota Leadership Program in Mobridge, South Dakota, an extension training program for lay and ordained ministry in the two dioceses of North and South Dakota that served the different tribes of Dakota (or Sioux) Indian people.

== Bishop ==
Harris was elected Bishop of Alaska in 1981, after the Dakota Leadership Program, again succeeding his predecessor David Cochran. Harris was consecrated bishop on June 7, 1981. He served in Alaska until he retired in March 1991. In his retirement, Bishop Harris was a Volunteer for Mission and visiting fellow at the College of the Ascension, Selly Oak, Birmingham, England, between 1991 and 1992. He died on May 7, 2000.

== View of integrated laity/priesthood ==
In 1983 Boone Porter reported about George Harris: "He described in detail the wide divergence between the teaching of the church about ordained and lay ministry and the actual practice. Concerning the priesthood he said, "the majority of parishes are still served by a single overworked priest who, in the absence of a remote and inaccessible bishop, a dearth of fellow-priests, a non-existent diaconate, and a passive laity, attempts to carry alone the entire ministerial function of the congregation."

By contrast, "it is only within a framework of a renewed and diversified ministry consisting of an accessible bishop, fellow-presbyters, a restored diaconate and a trained and active body of laity who have been 'equipped for ministry', that the priesthood can be restored to its function and relationship to the church." This conviction is underscored by Bishop Harris's master's dissertation, where he emphasizes laos as the whole people of God and that "the substance of these views might be said to be an attempt to recover the integrity of the clergy and laity and to view their common service to God as a total ministry...." and embraces the work of non-stipendiary priests and the laity as ultimately shaped, to use the words of Eliza Griswold in her article about Richard Rohr and the Universal Christ "as an integral part of the divine." Or as the 44-year old Harris stated: "moving against the tide, the sort of development that is under consideration here—the non-stipendiary ministry—involves a kind of deprofessionalization, a broadening rather than a focusing, a more free rather than a more precise trend."
