= Mark MacDonald (bishop) =

Anglican bishop (born 1954)

- Former National Indigenous Anglican Archbishop
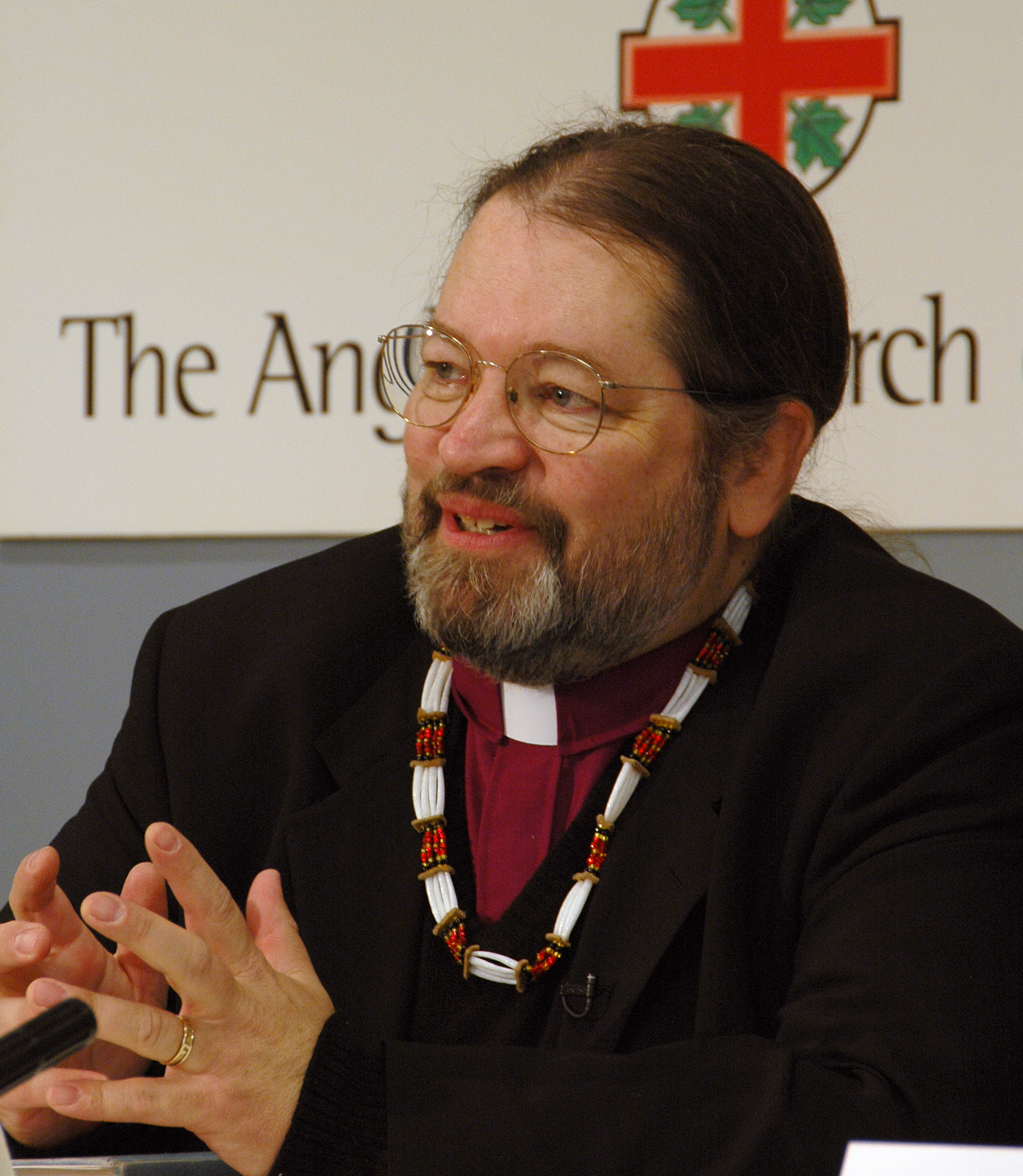
- Church: Anglican Church of Canada
- In office: 2007–2022
- Successor: Chris Harper
- Other posts: WCC President for North America (2013–2022); Bishop of Alaska, Episcopal Church (1997–2007)

Orders
- Ordination: 1 August 1979 by Robert Marshall Anderson
- Consecration: 13 September 1997 by Edmond L. Browning
- Laicized: 20 April 2022

Personal details
- Born: Mark Lawrence MacDonald; 15 January 1954 (age 72)
- Denomination: Anglicanism

Mark Lawrence MacDonald (born 15 January 1954) is a former Anglican bishop in the United States and Canada. From 2007 to 2022, he served as the National Indigenous Anglican Bishop (Archbishop, from 2019) for the Anglican Church of Canada; as such, he had pastoral oversight over all indigenous Canadian Anglicans. In April 2022, he resigned and relinquished his ministry following acknowledged sexual misconduct.

MacDonald previously served in the Episcopal Church in the United States as Bishop of Alaska (1997 to 2007) and as assistant bishop of the Navajoland Area Mission (2007 to 2009).

== Ordained ministry ==
=== Episcopal ministry ===
MacDonald was consecrated as a bishop on 13 September 1997. From 1997 to 2007, he was Bishop of Alaska in the Episcopal Church. In 2006, it was announced that he had been appointed assistant bishop of the Navajoland Area Mission, and he was affirmed in that appointment in 2007. He held the appointment co-currently with his Canadian bishopric until his term as assistant bishop ended in 2009.

In January 2007, it was announced that he would become the first National Indigenous Anglican Bishop in the Anglican Church of Canada. He took up the appointment on 22 June 2007. His post was elevated to the status of an archbishopric in 2019. He was also the World Council of Churches (WCC) president for North America from 2013.

MacDonald resigned as archbishop and relinquished his ministry following allegations of acknowledged sexual misconduct in April 2022. In a statement to the Anglican Journal, Archbishop Linda Nicholls clarified that the misconduct did not involve allegations of criminal behavior.

== Personal life ==
On 11 November 1989, MacDonald married Virginia Sha Lynn. Together, they have three children: two daughters and one son.

MacDonald is classified as a non-status Indian in Canada. He has native ancestry through both his parents.

== Honours ==
In February 2013, MacDonald was awarded the Queen Elizabeth II Diamond Jubilee Medal in recognition of his "spiritual leadership while serving Aboriginal communities and his contributions to environmental awareness of Canadians".

In March 2022, MacDonald was awarded the Archbishop of Canterbury's Cross of St Augustine "for outstanding service to support the Communion’s role in creation care and climate justice, including the voice of Indigenous peoples". In May 2022, Lambeth Palace confirmed that this award had been withdrawn, following an April 2022 announcement of acknowledged sexual misconduct by MacDonald and his resignation and relinquishment of ministry.

Anglican Communion titles
Preceded by Steven Charleston	Bishop of Alaska; 1997–2007	Succeeded by Mark Lattime
New title	National Indigenous Anglican Archbishop; 2007–2022	Succeeded by Chris Harper
