= Patrick W. Bell =

American bishop

The Right Reverend Patrick W. Bell
- Bishop of Eastern Oregon
- Church: Episcopal Church
- Diocese: Eastern Oregon
- Elected: December 12, 2015
- In office: 2015-present
- Predecessor: William O. Gregg

Orders
- Ordination: 1989 by Rustin R. Kimsey
- Consecration: April 16, 2016 by Michael Curry

Personal details
- Denomination: Anglican
- Spouse: Tina Marie Bell
- Children: 5

Patrick "Pat" W. Bell is the seventh and current bishop of the Episcopal Diocese of Eastern Oregon in the Episcopal Church in the United States of America. At his consecration Bell became the 1,093rd Bishop consecrated for the Episcopal Church.

== Biography ==
Bell was born and raised in the northern Palouse region of Washington. Raised as an Episcopalian, Bell became a Pentecostal minister and professor before returning to the Episcopal Church. After completing studies at the Seminary of the Southwest he was ordained to the priesthood in 1989 by Bishop Rustin R. Kimsey and began work at St. Matthew's Church in Ontario, Oregon. In 2002 Bell was named the rector of St Luke's Church in Coeur d'Alene, Idaho. Bell is married to Tina Marie Bell and has five children and eight grandchildren.

On December 12, 2015, Bell was elected the Bishop of Eastern Oregon on the first ballot. Bell was one of 16 candidates for the position, and one of three finalists. Bell's consecration took place on April 16, 2016, with Presiding Bishop Michael Curry as chief consecrator. Bell announced his intention to continue to live in Coeur d'Alene and commute to Oregon to work as the Bishop works on a part-time basis.

== See also ==
- List of Episcopal bishops of the United States
- Historical list of the Episcopal bishops of the United States
