= Rustin R. Kimsey =

American bishop

The Right Reverend Rustin R. Kimsey
- Bishop of Eastern Oregon
- Church: Episcopal Church
- Diocese: Eastern Oregon
- Elected: March 22, 1980
- In office: 1980-2000
- Predecessor: William B. Spofford
- Successor: William O. Gregg

Orders
- Ordination: December 18, 1960 (priest) by Lane W. Barton
- Consecration: August 4, 1980 by John Allin

Personal details
- Born: June 20, 1935 Bend, Oregon, United States
- Died: April 10, 2015 (aged 79) The Dalles, Oregon, United States
- Buried: Dufur Cemetery, Dufur, Oregon
- Denomination: Anglican
- Parents: Lauren Chamness Kimsey & Lois Elena Moorhead
- Spouse: Gretchen Beck Rinehart (m. 1961)
- Children: 2

Rustin Ray "Rusty" Kimsey (June 20, 1935 – April 10, 2015) was an American prelate of the Episcopal Church who served as the fifth bishop of the Episcopal Diocese of Eastern Oregon between 1980 and 2000.

== Early life and education ==
Kimsey was born on June 20, 1935, in Bend, Oregon, the son of Lauren Chamness Kimsey (1904-1975) and Lois Elena Moorhead (1904-1997). He was a sixth-generation Oregonian. He was educated at the public schools in Bend, Oregon, and Hermiston, Oregon, and then attended the University of Oregon from which he earned a Bachelor of Science in 1957. He then went on to study at the Episcopal Theological Seminary in Cambridge, Massachusetts, from which he graduated with a Bachelor of Divinity in 1960.

== Ordained ministry ==
Kimsey was ordained deacon in 1960 and priest on December 18, 1960, by Bishop Lane W. Barton of Eastern Oregon. He initially served as vicar of St John's Church in Hermiston, Oregon, between 1960 and 1961 and then priest-in-charge of St Paul's Church in Nyssa, Oregon, in 1961. From 1961 he was vicar of St Alban's Church in Albany, Oregon, while in 1967 he became rector of St Stephen's Church. In 1971 he became rector of St Paul's Church in The Dalles, Oregon, where he remained until 1980.

== Episcopacy ==
On March 22, 1980, Kimsey was elected on the third ballot as the Bishop of Eastern Oregon. He was consecrated on August 4, 1980 with Presiding Bishop John Allin as chief consecrator at The Dalles High School Kurtz Gymnasium. Between 1994 and 2000 he chaired the Episcopal Church’s Commission on Ecumenical Relations and was instrumental in bringing about the full communion between the Episcopal Church and the Evangelical Lutheran Church in America. He retired as Bishop of Eastern Oregon in June 2000. In 2005 became Assisting Bishop of the Navajoland Area Mission, and retained the post until July 2006. In 2009 he accepted his appointment as Assisting Bishop of Alaska and remained there until 2010. 2010. He died on April 10, 2015, in The Dalles, Oregon.

== See also ==
- List of bishops of the Episcopal Church in the United States of America
