= Mark Lattime =

The Right Reverend Mark Lattime
- Bishop of Alaska
- Church: Episcopal Church
- Diocese: Alaska
- Elected: April 10, 2010
- In office: 2010–present
- Predecessor: Mark MacDonald

Orders
- Ordination: 1997 (deacon); 1997 (priest)
- Consecration: September 4, 2010 by Katharine Jefferts Schori

Personal details
- Born: Mark Andrew Lattime
- Denomination: Anglican

Mark Andrew Lattime is the eighth and current bishop of the Episcopal Diocese of Alaska.

== Biography ==
After studies at Dickinson College from where he earned a Bachelor of Arts in Anthropology and Religion, and Bexley Hall from where he graduated with a Master of Divinity, Lattime was ordained to the diaconate and priesthood in 1997. Lattime served as a college chaplain and associate rector of the Robert E. Lee Memorial Church in Lexington, Virginia. In 2000 he then became rector of St Michael's Church in Geneseo, New York.

Lattime was elected on the fourth ballot as Bishop of Alaska on April 10, 2010. He was consecrated as a bishop on September 4, 2010, by Katharine Jefferts Schori, George Councell, Prince G. Singh, Jack Marston McKelvey, and James Edward Waggoner Jr at the First United Methodist Church in Anchorage, Alaska.

== See also ==
- List of Episcopal bishops of the United States
- Historical list of the Episcopal bishops of the United States
