= William H. Wolfrum =

American bishop (1926–2007)

The Right Reverend William Harvey Wolfrum D.D.
- Suffragan Bishop of Colorado
- Church: Episcopal Church
- Diocese: Colorado
- Elected: September 13, 1980
- In office: 1981–1988
- Other post: Interim Bishop of Navajoland (1988–1990)

Orders
- Ordination: January 6, 1960 by Charles J. Kinsolving III
- Consecration: January 6, 1981 by John Allin

Personal details
- Born: January 16, 1926 Warrensburg, Missouri, United States
- Died: November 24, 2007 (aged 81) Fort Collins, Colorado, United States
- Denomination: Anglican
- Parents: Oscar William Wolfrum & Lucille Bales Insley
- Spouse: Beverly Ann Gunn (m. 1947)
- Children: 3

William Harvey "Dub" Wolfrum (January 16, 1926 – November 24, 2007) was a suffragan bishop of the Episcopal Diocese of Colorado from 1981 to 1988, serving subsequently in the Navajoland Area Mission.

== Early life and education ==
Wolfrum was born on January 16, 1926, in Warrensburg, Missouri, the son of Oscar William Wolfrum and Lucille Bales Insley. He studied at the Central Missouri State University, from which he graduated with a Bachelor of Science in biology in 1949. He then earned a Master of Science in fisheries management from Cornell University in 1952. Between 1952 and 1956, he worked as a District Fisheries Biologist with the New Mexico Department of Game and Fish. In 1956, he enrolled at the Seminary of the Southwest, from where he graduated with a Bachelor of Divinity in 1959, and awarded an honorary Doctor of Divinity in 1981.

== Ordained ministry ==
In 1959, Wolfrum was ordained deacon, and on January 6, 1960, he was ordained priest by the Bishop of Rio Grande Charles J. Kinsolving III. Between 1959 and 1962, he served at St Paul's Church in Artesia, New Mexico, and then from 1962 to 1968 as rector of Trinity-on-the-Hill Church in Los Alamos, New Mexico. In 1968, he became chaplain at St Stephen's Episcopal School in Austin, Texas, and chairman of the department of religion. In 1971, he became rector of St Alban's Church in Worland, Wyoming, where he remained till 1980.

== Bishop ==
On September 13, 1980, during a convention held in St John's Cathedral, Wolfrum was elected Suffragan Bishop of Colorado on the seventh ballot. He was consecrated on January 6, 1981, by Presiding bishop John Allin. Wolfrum remained in Colorado till 1988, he was elected Interim Bishop of Navajoland, a post he retained till 1990. Between 1990 and 1991, he briefly also acted as bishop-in-charge of the Diocese of Colorado, until a new bishop was elected. Wolfrum died suddenly on November 24, 2007, in Fort Collins, Colorado.
