= David Cochran =

American bishop (1915–2001)

The Right Reverend David Rea Cochran
- Bishop of Alaska
- Church: Episcopal Church
- Diocese: Alaska
- In office: 1974–1981
- Predecessor: William Gordon
- Successor: George Clinton Harris

Orders
- Ordination: September 14, 1940 by Lewis Bliss Whittemore
- Consecration: August 28, 1974 by John Allin

Personal details
- Born: April 9, 1915 Buffalo, New York, United States
- Died: October 30, 2001 (aged 86) Tacoma, Washington, United States
- Denomination: Anglican
- Parents: Clement Cochran & Agnes Haynes
- Spouse: Mary Elizabeth Zabriskie (m. 1942)
- Children: 3

David Rea Cochran (April 9, 1915 – October 30, 2001) was bishop of the Episcopal Diocese of Alaska from 1974 to 1981.

== Biography ==
Cochran was born in Buffalo, New York, on April 9, 1915, to Clement Cochran and Agnes Haynes. In 1939 he graduated from the Episcopal Theological School in Cambridge, Massachusetts, after obtaining his B.A. degree from Hamilton College, New York, in 1936. He was ordained deacon in February 1940 by Bishop Henry Hobson, and priest on September 14, 1940, by Bishop Lewis Bliss Whittemore of Western Michigan. He served as curate at St Mark's Church in Grand Rapids, Michigan between 1940 and 1942, and then rector of St Paul's Church in Dowagiac, Michigan until 1948. During World War II he served as a U.S. Army chaplain. From 1946 to 1952, Cochran was also the Episcopal chaplain at the University of Washington in Seattle.

== Bishop ==
On August 28, 1974, Bishop Cochran was consecrated by Presiding Bishop John Allin as principal consecrator. Co-consecrators were William Gordon, former Bishop of Alaska and George T. Masuda, Bishop of North Dakota. Bishop Cochran had served as director of the Dakota Leadership Training program prior to his election to Alaska. A typical Alaskan welcome was given to Cochran following the consecration, and included native entertainment by the Arctic Coast Dancers and Singers and the Minto Dancers and Singers. Cochran retired in 1981 and settled in the Washington where he served as Vicar of Holy Family of Jesus Cambodian Church between 1984 and 1988 and as interim rector at St. Matthew's Church in Tacoma, Washington.

== Death ==
Bishop Cochran died on October 30, 2001, during his sleep. He died 24 hours after submitting his memoirs for proofreading.

== Personal life ==
Cochran married Mary Elizabeth Zabriskie and they had three children.
