= Steven Charleston =

American Indigenous writer, academic, and former Episcopal bishop (born 1949)

The Right Reverend Steven Charleston
- Bishop of Alaska
- Church: Episcopal Church
- Diocese: Alaska
- Elected: October 6, 1990
- In office: 1991–1996
- Predecessor: George Clinton Harris
- Successor: Mark MacDonald
- Other posts: Dean of Episcopal Divinity School (1999–2008); Assistant Bishop of California (2008-2009)

Orders
- Ordination: March 1983
- Consecration: March 23, 1991 by Edmond L. Browning

Personal details
- Born: February 15, 1949 (age 77) Duncan, Oklahoma, United States
- Denomination: Anglicanism
- Spouse: Susan Flora Shettles
- Children: 1
- Education: Trinity College, Connecticut; Episcopal Divinity School

Steven Charleston (born February 15, 1949) is a retired American Episcopal bishop and academic. He is a member of the Choctaw Nation and a prolific writer, primarily on American theological, Indigenous, and cultural issues. He was bishop of the Episcopal Diocese of Alaska from 1991 to 1996, and dean of Episcopal Divinity School in Cambridge, Massachusetts from 1999 to 2008.

== Early life and education ==
Charleston was born and grew up in Oklahoma and is a citizen of the Choctaw Nation of Oklahoma. In 1971 he received a bachelor's degree in religion from Trinity College in Hartford, Connecticut, followed by a master's degree in divinity from Episcopal Divinity School in 1976.

== Ordained ministry ==
He later worked in Native American ministries and held various teaching positions.

In 1999, following the divisions exposed by the previous year's Lambeth Conference, he was the author of the Cambridge Accord: an attempt to reach agreement on at least the human rights of homosexual people, notwithstanding controversy within the Anglican Communion about the churches' views of homosexuality.

As of 2017 Charleston was adjunct professor of Native American ministries at Saint Paul School of Theology, based at Oklahoma City University. Via the web at the same time he described himself as a "Native American elder, author, and retired Episcopal bishop", and maintained a public presence through his Facebook page of daily spiritual reflections. He has self-published several volumes of these reflections, plus two novels of a planned trilogy, through his company Red Moon Publications.

== Bibliography ==
- Charleston, Steven (1994). Good News From Native America: The Words and Witness of Bishop Steven Charleston. ASIN B00A5WP3IC.
- Charleston, Steven (2014). Good News: A Scriptural Path to Reconciliation. Forward Movement. ISBN 978-0880283816.
- Charleston, Steven; Robinson, Elaine (2015). Coming Full Circle: Constructing Native Christian Theology. Fortress Press. ISBN 978-1451487985.
- Charleston, Steven (2015). The Four Vision Quests of Jesus. Morehouse Publishing. ISBN 978-0819231734.
- Charleston, Steven (2021). Ladder to the Light. Broadleaf Books. ISBN 978-1506465739.
- Self-published annual collections of Charleston's daily reflections:
  - Charleston, Steven (2011). Cloud Walking. Red Moon Publications. ISBN 978-0-9851419-2-9.
  - Charleston, Steven (2012). Hope As Old As Fire. Red Moon Publications. ISBN 978-0-9851419-0-5.
  - Charleston, Steven (2013). Climbing Stairs of Sunlight. Red Moon Publications. ISBN 978-0-9851419-6-7.
  - Charleston, Steven (2014). Arrows of Light. Red Moon Publications. ISBN 978-0-9851419-7-4.
  - Charleston, Steven (2015). Turn to the Wild Wind. Red Moon Publications. ISBN 978-0-9851419-9-8.
  - Charleston, Steven (2023). Spirit Wheel: Meditations from an Indigenous Elder. Broadleaf books. ISBN 978-1-5064-8665-9.
- Self-published novels:
  - Charleston, Steven (2016). Bishop of Mars. Red Moon Publications. ISBN 978-0-9851419-3-6.
  - Charleston, Steven (2016). The Tao of Mars. Red Moon Publications. ISBN 978-0-9851419-8-1.
  - Charleston, Steven (2017). The Madonna of Mars. Red Moon Publications. ISBN 978-0-9987540-1-7.
