= William O. Gregg =

American bishop

The Right Reverend William O. Gregg
- Bishop of Eastern Oregon
- Church: Episcopal Church
- Diocese: Eastern Oregon
- Elected: May 13, 2000
- In office: 2000-2007
- Predecessor: Rustin R. Kimsey
- Successor: Patrick W. Bell

Orders
- Consecration: September 23, 2000 by Edmond L. Browning

Personal details
- Born: September 15, 1951 (age 75) [Portsmouth, VA], United States
- Denomination: Anglican
- Spouse: Kathleen
- Children: 1

William Otis Gregg (born September 15, 1951) was sixth bishop of the Episcopal Diocese of Eastern Oregon from 2000 to 2007. He was consecrated on September 23, 2000.

== Biography ==
Gregg was born on September 15, 1951, in Portsmouth, Virginia. He studied at the University of Richmond from where he earned a Bachelor of Divinity and later at the Episcopal Divinity School, from where he graduated with a Master of Divinity. He also holds a Master of Arts and a Doctor of Philosophy from the University of Notre Dame.

After ordination Gregg served in a number of posts, notably as rector of St Thomas' Church in Abingdon, Virginia, from 1982 to 1987, and associate professor at Saint Mary-of-the-Woods College in South Bend, Indiana, from 1991 to 1996. Between 1997 and 200 he was rector of St James' Church in New London, Connecticut.

He was elected Bishop of Eastern Oregon on May 13, 2000, on the second ballot. He was then consecrated on September 23, 2000, with former Presiding Bishop Edmond L. Browning as chief consecrator. He remained in office until his resignation on April 30, 2007. He then accepted the post of Assistant Bishop of North Carolina. In 2020 he joined the academic staff at Hood Theological Seminary.
