= William Chauncey Emhardt =

Secretary of the Episcopal church

William Chauncey Emhardt (January 29, 1874 – August 5, 1950) was secretary of the Episcopal Church's Advisory Commission on Ecclesiastical Relations, and a prominent figure in ecumenical relations between Anglicans and Orthodox Christians, as well as Anglicans and Old Catholics. He was ordained to the priesthood on May 19, 1898, by Bishop Frank Rosebrook Millspaugh, Bishop of the Episcopal Diocese of Kansas.

He received his A.B. from the University of Pennsylvania in 1894, following education at the Episcopal Academy, Philadelphia. He attended the now-defunct Philadelphia Divinity School, which conferred an honorary S.T.D. on him in 1931.

He served as rector of the Trinity Church, Arkansas City, Kansas (assisting at St. John's Military School, Salina, Kansas); Church of the Ascension, Gloucester, New Jersey (1902-1907); St. Luke's Episcopal Church, Newtown, Pennsylvania (1907-1920), and on a number of ecclesiastical commissions. He was the executive director of the Foreign Born Division of the National Council of the Episcopal Church.

== Bibliography ==
- An Unofficial Anglican Programme for Reunion, as Contained in a Letter to His Grace the Metropolitan of Athens, October 26, 1918 (1920)
- The Eastern-Orthodox Church: A Brief Description of the Orthodox Church of the East together with Some Thoughts on Reunion (1920)
- Historical Contact of the Eastern Orthodox and Anglican Churches: A review of the relations between the Orthodox Church of the East and the Anglican Church since the time of Theodore of Tarsus (1920)
- (with George Lamsa) The Oldest Christian People: A Brief Account of the History and Traditions of the Assyrian People and the Fateful History of the Nestorian Church. NY: Macmillan, 1926.
- The Eastern Church in the Western World (1928)
- Religion in Soviet Russia: Anarchy (Milwaukee: Morehouse; London: Mowbray, 1929)
- The Old Catholic Movement--Our Attitude toward It (1931).
