= William B. Spofford =

4th Bishop of the Episcopal Diocese of Eastern Oregon (1921-2013)

The Right Reverend William B. Spofford
- Bishop of Eastern Oregon
- Church: Episcopal Church
- Diocese: Eastern Oregon
- Elected: October 1968
- In office: 1969-1979
- Predecessor: Lane W. Barton
- Successor: Rustin R. Kimsey
- Other post: Assistant Bishop of Washington (1979-1984)

Orders
- Ordination: November 1944 (deacon); June 23, 1945 (priest) by William Appleton Lawrence
- Consecration: January 25, 1969 by John E. Hines

Personal details
- Born: January 28, 1921 Brooklyn, New York City, United States
- Died: November 5, 2013 (aged 92) Portland, Oregon, United States
- Denomination: Anglican
- Parents: William B. Spofford Sr. & Dorothy Grace Ibbotson
- Spouse: Pauline Lindell Fawcett (m. 1944; died 2008)
- Children: 5

William Benjamin Spofford, Jr. (January 28, 1921 – November 5, 2013) was the 4th Bishop of the Episcopal Diocese of Eastern Oregon from 1969 to 1979 From 1979 to 1984 he served as Assistant Bishop of Washington (D.C.).

== Early life and education ==
Spofford was born in Brooklyn on January 28, 1921, the son of Dorothy Grace Ibbotson and William B. Spofford Sr., also a priest and from 1919 to 1972 editor of The Witness. He was educated at the Lenox School for Boys, and later received a Bachelor of Arts from Antioch College in 1943, and a Bachelor of Divinity from the Episcopal Theological School (now the Episcopal Divinity School) in Cambridge, Massachusetts in 1945, which also bestowed its Distinguished Alumnus Award on him in 2009. He later studied at the Yale Center for Alcohol Studies and earned an MSW from the University of Michigan in 1950. He was also awarded a number of honorary doctorates, notably a Doctor of Divinity from the Church Divinity School of the Pacific in 1968, and a Doctor of Sacred Theology from the College of Idaho in 1972.

== Ordained ministry ==
Spofford was ordained deacon in November 1944 and priest on June 23, 1945 at the Church of the Good Shepherd in Boston by Bishop William Appleton Lawrence of Western Massachusetts. He had married Pauline Lindell Fawcett on September 9, 1944 and together had five children. She died in 2008. He initially served as minister-in-charge of the Church of the Good Shepherd in Boston from 1944 until 1946 and as acting minister at Grace Church in Jamaica, Queens in 1946. He then served as Executive Secretary of the Episcopal League for Social Action between 1946 and 1949 and as rector of St Thomas Church in Detroit from 1947 until 1950. In 1950 he became the Assistant Director of the Western Extension Center at the Town-Country Church Institute in Weiser, Idaho and then became its director in 1953. He held the latter post until 1956 when he was appointed chief of chaplain at the Massachusetts General Hospital. Between 1960 and 1968 he held the post of Dean of St Michael's Cathedral in Boise, Idaho.

== Bishop ==
In October 1968 Spofford was elected Missionary Bishop of Eastern Oregon and was consecrated on January 25, 1969 by Presiding Bishop John E. Hines. During his episcopacy the missionary district became a diocese and thus he became the first diocesan bishop of Eastern Oregon in 1971. He retired in 1979 and then served as Assistant Bishop in the Episcopal Diocese of Washington until 1984, and then briefly again in 1990. Later he was also bishop-chaplain at St. George's College, Jerusalem. He died at his home in Portland, Oregon on November 5, 2013.
