= Henry R. Gummey =

Henry Riley Gummey, Jr. (January 12, 1870 — May 29, 1941) was a prominent Episcopal priest and author active in Pennsylvania, Bermuda, and New Jersey. Gummey was born in Philadelphia and educated at Germantown Academy and Episcopal Academy, followed by studies at the University of Pennsylvania (BA, 1890), the General Theological Seminary in New York (1893), and the former Philadelphia Divinity School (PDS). In 1905, he received the D.D. from PDS, where he served as professor of Liturgy and Canon Law. He was made deacon in 1893 and priest in 1894 by Bishop Ozi William Whitaker.

Gummey was curate at the Parishes of Paget and Warwick in Bermuda. He was rector of the Church of St. John the Baptist, Germantown from 1897 to 1906, of Grace Church, Haddonfield, New Jersey (1907-1910), and of St. James, Downingtown (1913-1936). He was professor of liturgy at the University of the South in 1911 and 1912.

Riley was a member of the Henry Bradshaw Society, the Ecclesiological Society, the Plainsong and Medieval Music Society, the Christian Social Union, the Pennsylvania Society for the Prevention of Social Diseases, the Genealogical Society of Pennsylvania, the Historical Society of the Episcopal Church, the American Society of Church History, the University Club of Philadelphia, and the Historical Society of Montgomery County. He was also a prominent figure in American Anglican-Orthodox relations.

Gummey married Margaret Upjohn on June 30, 1897. He died in Philadelphia and is buried at St. Luke's Church, Germantown. His collection of rare books on Eucharistic theology is in the Yarnall Library of Theology of S. Clement's Church at the University of Pennsylvania. It includes 62 bound volumes of pamphlets on the history of the Holy Eucharist.

== Bibliography ==
- The Prayer of Consecration in the American Liturgy: An Exposition (Independently published, 1902)
- The Consecration of the Eucharist: A Study of the Prayer of Consecration in the Communion Office from the Point of View of the Alterations and Amendments Established Therein by the Revisers of 1789 (Philadelphia: Henry Anners; London: The De La More Press, 1908)
