= Steven T. Plummer =

Steven Tsosie Plummer (August 14, 1944 - April 2, 2005) was bishop of the Navajoland Area Mission in the Episcopal Church of the United States of America from 1990 to 2005. He was also the first Navajo bishop of the Episcopal Church.

Plummer attended Church Divinity School of the Pacific. He was ordained to the priesthood in June of 1976. He married Catherine Black in 1977. In 1991, he received an honorary doctorate from Nashotah House Theological Seminary in Wisconsin.
