= Peter Trimble Rowe =

Canadian prelate

The Right Reverend Peter Trimble Rowe
- Bishop of Alaska
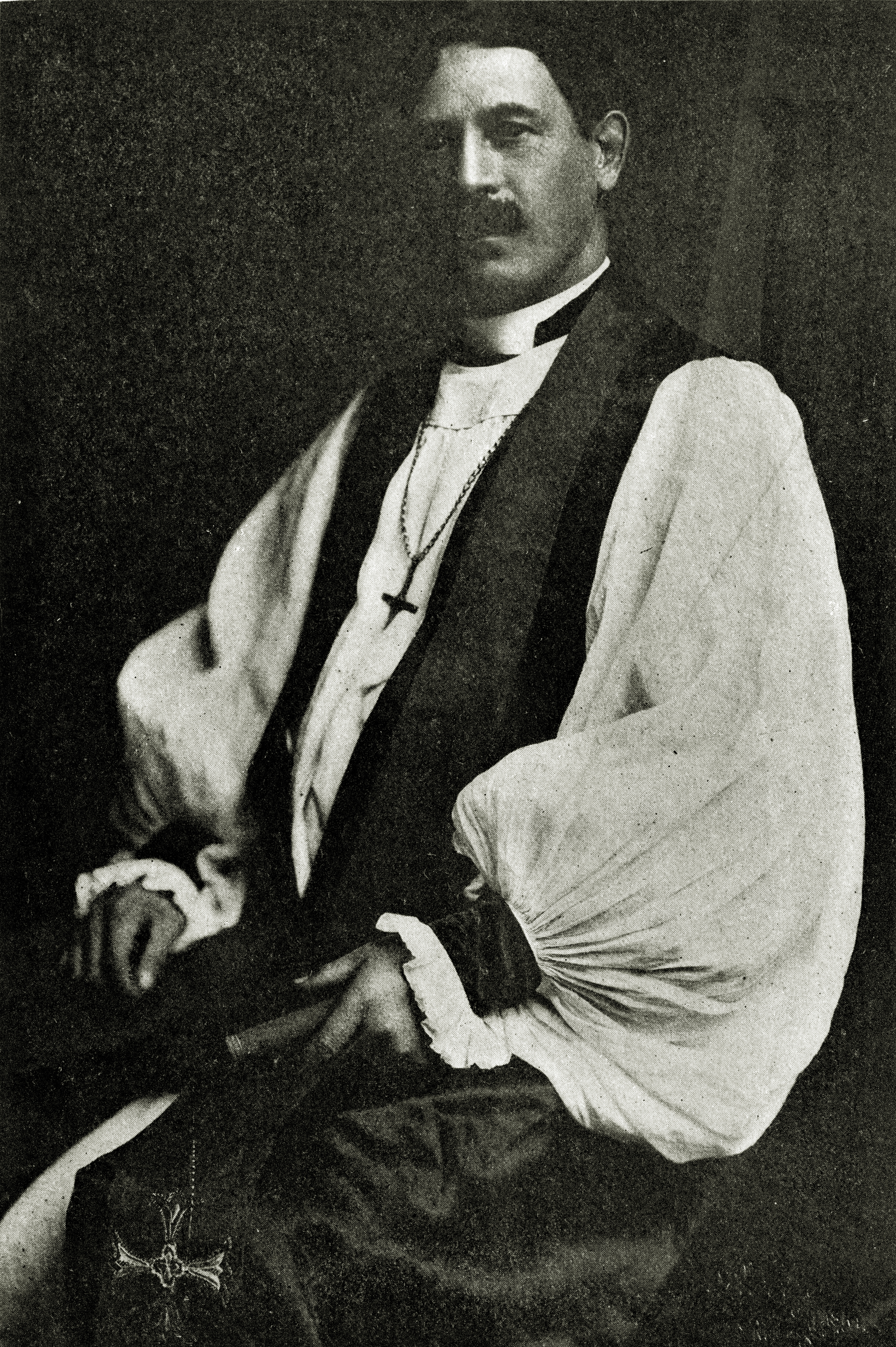
- Church: Episcopal Church
- Diocese: Alaska
- In office: 1895–1942
- Successor: John Boyd Bentley

Orders
- Ordination: November 14, 1880 by Frederick Fauquier
- Consecration: November 30, 1895 by William Croswell Doane

Personal details
- Born: November 20, 1856 Meadowvale, Toronto Township, Ontario, Canada
- Died: June 1, 1942 (aged 85) Victoria, British Columbia, Canada
- Buried: Sitka, Alaska
- Denomination: Anglican
- Parents: Peter Rowe & Mary Elizabeth Trimble
- Spouse: Dora Henriette Carry (m. 1882; died 1914) Rose H. Fullerton (m. 1915)
- Children: 5
- Education: Trinity College, Toronto

Peter Trimble Rowe (November 20, 1856 – June 1, 1942) was a Canadian prelate who served for decades as the first bishop of the American Episcopal Diocese of Alaska.

== Early life and education ==
Peter Rowe was born in Meadowvale, Toronto Township, Ontario. He attended local schools and went to Trinity College, Toronto. There he earned his bachelor's degree in 1878, his master's degree in 1880, and received an honorary Doctor of Divinity degree in 1895.

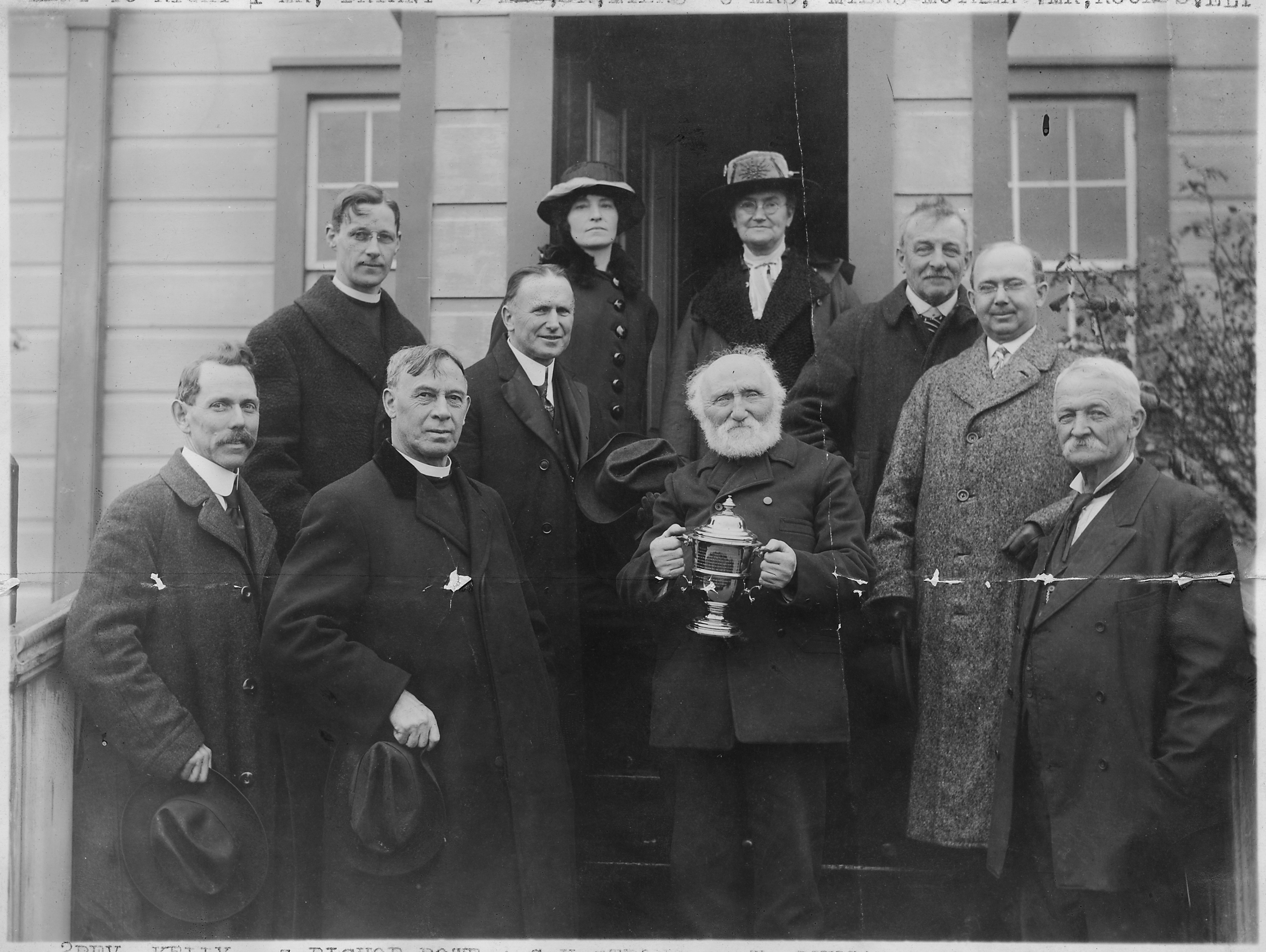
Rowe, second from left in the front row, standing next to William Duncan, to his left, in 1918. Duncan, late in his life, was presented with a loving cup on this occasion.

== Clergy ==
Rowe was ordained to the diaconate in 1878 and the priesthood in 1880, by Frederick Dawson Fauquier, bishop of the Diocese of Algoma.

In 1895, he was appointed Missionary Bishop of Alaska. He was consecrated on November 30, 1895, by William Croswell Doane, Ozi William Whittaker, and Thomas A. Starkey.

Rowe traveled across his vast diocese for decades, by dogsled, boat and other frontier means. He gained many admirers, among whom was his colleague Hudson Stuck, Archdeacon of the Yukon. Stuck praised Rowe's dedication in his three books published to combat exploitation of the native peoples among whom they served.

Rowe died in Victoria, British Columbia on June 1, 1942.
