= William Andrew Leonard =

American author and prelate of the Episcopal Church

The Right Reverend William Andrew Leonard D.D., LL.D.
- Bishop of Ohio
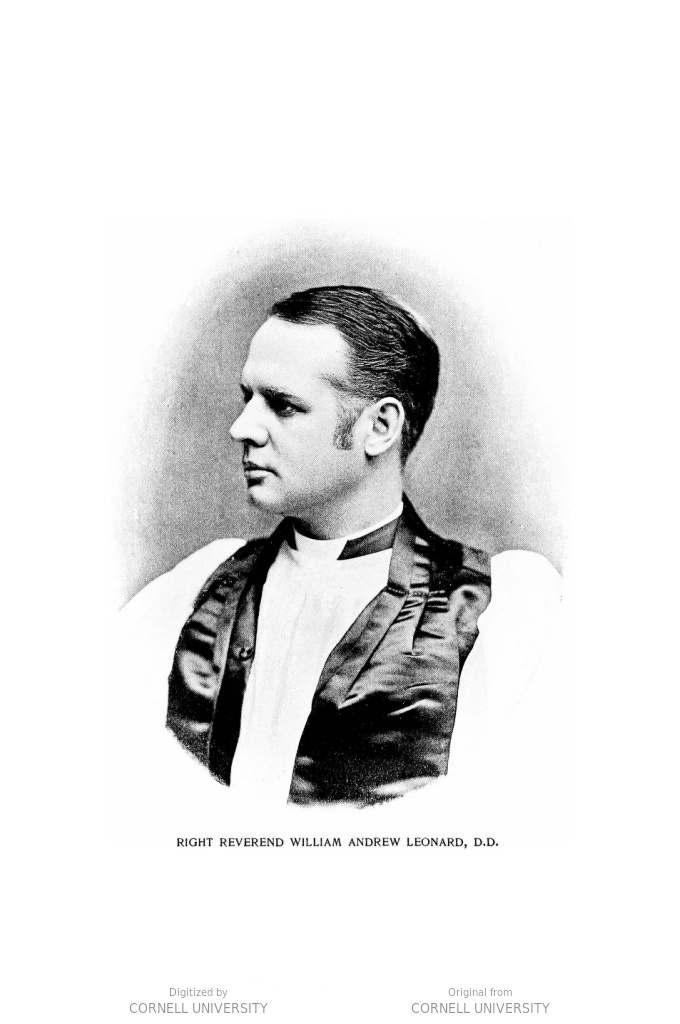
- Church: Episcopal Church
- Diocese: Ohio
- Elected: May 15, 1889
- In office: 1889–1930
- Predecessor: Gregory T. Bedell
- Successor: Warren Lincoln Rogers

Orders
- Ordination: July 21, 1873 by John Williams
- Consecration: October 12, 1889 by John Williams

Personal details
- Born: July 15, 1848 Southport, Connecticut, United States
- Died: September 21, 1930 (aged 82) Gambier, Ohio, United States
- Buried: Trinity Cathedral
- Denomination: Anglican
- Parents: William B. Leonard & Louise D. Bulkley
- Spouse: Sara Louisa Sullivan (m. 1873)
- Education: St Stephens College

William Andrew Leonard (July 15, 1848 - September 21, 1930) was an American author and prelate of the Episcopal Church, who served as the fourth Bishop of Ohio from 1889 till 1930.

== Early life and education ==
Leonard was born on July 15, 1848, in Southport, Connecticut, the son of William B. Leonard and Louise D. Bulkley. His grandfather was Stephen B. Leonard, a United States House of Representatives member from New York. He was educated at Phillips Academy in Andover, Massachusetts. He spent part of his early youth in Mount Vernon, Ohio, where he worked as a clerk in a clothing store owned by a relative. He then studied at St Stephen's College in Annandale-on-Hudson, New York, from which he graduated with a Bachelor of Arts in 1866. He also graduated with a Bachelor of Divinity from Berkeley Divinity School in 1871. In 1878, he received honorarr Doctor of Divinity degrees from Washington and Lee University, Berkeley Divinity School, and St Stephen's College, while in 1921, he received a Doctor of Laws from Kenyon College.

== Ordained ministry ==
Leonard was ordained deacon on May 31, 1871, in Trinity Church, Middletown, Connecticut, and then priest on July 21, 1873, in St John's Church, Stamford, Connecticut, on both occasions by Bishop John Williams. He served his diaconate at Holy Trinity Church in Brooklyn from 1871 to 1872. In 1872, he became rector of the Church of the Redeemer in Brooklyn. He subsequently served as chaplain of the Twenty-Third Regiment of the New York National Guard from 1876 till 1880. In 1880, he moved to Washington, D.C., to become rector of St. John's Episcopal Church, Lafayette Square.

== Bishop ==
On May 15, 1889, after four special conventions to elect a bishop, Leonard was elected Coadjutor Bishop of Ohio. He was consecrated on October 12, 1889, by Presiding Bishop John Williams. He immediately succeeded as diocesan bishop that same year after the resignation of Bishop Bedell. Leonard was one of the founders of Trinity Cathedral, the diocesan cathedral completed in 1907. He was also responsible for the construction of several buildings on the campus of Kenyon College. On two occasions, he also briefly served as acting Presiding Bishop in 1929 and 1930, respectively. Leonard died in office in Gambier, Ohio, on September 21, 1930.

== Publications ==
- Music in the Western Church: A Lecture on the History of Psalmody, Illustrated With Examples of the Music of the Various Periods (1872)
- Via Sacra: Or, Footprints Of Christ. A Book For Holy Week (1875)
- A Brief History of the Christian Church (1883)
- A Faithful Life (1888)
- The Story of the Prayer Book (1898)
- A Biography of Stephen Banks Leonard (1909)
