= Episcopal Diocese of Eastern Oregon =

Diocese of the Episcopal Church in the United States

Coordinates: 44°N 120°W

Diocese of Eastern Oregon

Location
- Country: United States
- Territory: Baker, Crook, Deschutes, Gilliam, Grant, Harney, Hood River, Jefferson, Klamath, Lake Malheur, Morrow, Sherman, Umatilla, Union, Wallowa, Wasco, Wheeler, Klickitat
- Ecclesiastical province: VIII (Pacific)

Statistics
- Churches: 19 (2024)
- Members: 1,476 (2025)

Information
- Denomination: Episcopal Church
- Established: November 19, 1971

Current leadership
- Bishop: Patrick W. Bell

Map
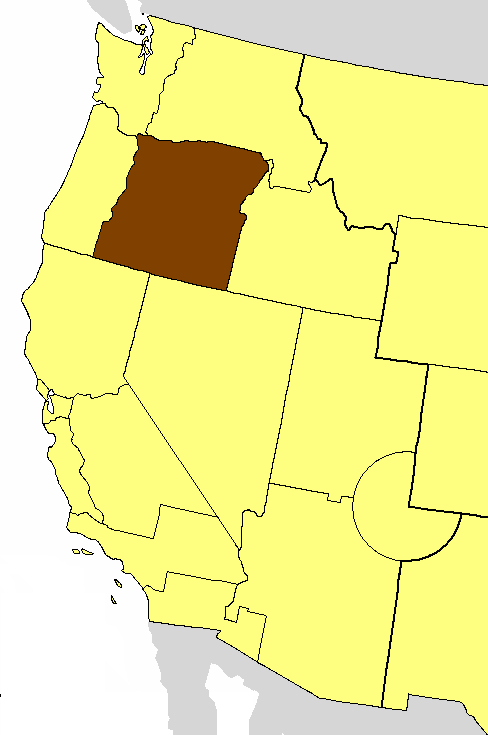
- Location of the Diocese of Eastern Oregon

Website
- www.episdioeo.org

The Episcopal Diocese of Eastern Oregon is the diocese of the Episcopal Church in the United States of America which has jurisdiction over Oregon east of the Cascade Mountains. It also includes Klickitat County, Washington. It is in Province 8. The diocesan office is in Cove, Oregon.

The diocese reported 2,016 members in 2017 and 1,476 members in 2025. Plate and pledge income for the 19 filing congregations of the diocese in 2025 was $1,835,762. Average Sunday attendance (ASA) for 2025 was 644 persons, a relative decrease from 913 in 2017.

== History ==
The Diocese of Eastern Oregon was created as a missionary district from the Episcopal Diocese of Oregon in 1907 and became a separate diocese in 1971.

== Leadership ==
Following the resignation in 2007 of the 6th Bishop of Eastern Oregon, William O. Gregg, to become assistant bishop in the Episcopal Diocese of North Carolina, the diocesan leadership concluded that it was not financially possible to appoint another diocesan bishop for the time being. Instead, it was proposed that a Provisional Bishop be appointed on a part-time basis for a period of three years in the first instance.

In March 2009, the Standing Committee of the Diocese appointed Nedi Rivera, Bishop Suffragan of the Episcopal Diocese of Olympia since 2004, as Assisting Bishop. Rivera was subsequently elected and installed as Provisional Bishop at the Diocesan Convention on May 23, 2009, for a three-year term to Spring 2012, serving on a fractional time (one third) basis. In Spring 2012, Rivera's term as Provisional Bishop was extended by one year, ending in March 2015.

On December 12, 2015 Patrick W. Bell was elected as the seventh Bishop of the diocese. Bell, who was serving as pastor of St. Luke's Episcopal Church in Coeur d’Alene, Idaho, was consecrated as bishop in April 2016. Bell announced his intention to continue to reside in Coeur d’Alene and commute to Oregon for his work as Bishop.

== List of bishops ==
Bishops of Eastern Oregon
From	Until	Incumbent	Notes
1907	1922	Robert L. Paddock	Robert Lewis Paddock (December 24, 1869, Brooklyn, NY – May 17, 1939, Brooklyn, NY); consecrated Missionary Bishop of Eastern Oregon December 18, 1907; retired September 1922.
1923	1945	William P. Remington	Consecrated c. 1913; suffragan in South Dakota 1913–1922; elected 1922; installed November 19, 1923; suffragan in Pennsylvania 1945–1951.
1946	1968	Lane W. Barton	Lane Wickham Barton (3 June 1899, Norwalk, OH – January 5, 1997, Vancouver, WA); elected September 11 and consecrated November 26, 1946; retired 1968.
1969	1979	William B. Spofford	William Benjamin Spofford, Junior (January 28, 1921—November 5, 2013); elected 1968; consecrated January 25, 1969; retired 1979.
1980	2000	Rustin R. Kimsey	Rustin Ray Kimsey (born January 20, 1935, Bend, OR - died April 11, 2015); elected March 22 and consecrated August 4, 1980; retired June 2000.
2000	2007	William O. Gregg	William "Bill" Otis Gregg (born in Portsmouth, VA); elected May 13 and consecrated September 23, 2000; resigned April 30, 2007.
2009	2016	Nedi Rivera, Provisional Bishop	Also suffragan in Olympia, 2005–2010; consecrated January 22, 2005; elected May and installed May 23, 2009; term ended March 2015.
2016	present	Patrick W. Bell	Elected on December 12, 2015, and consecrated in April, 2016.
