= Beverley Tucker =

Beverley Tucker may refer to:

- Nathaniel Beverley Tucker (1784–1851), American judge and legal scholar who often went by his middle name
- Nathaniel Beverley Tucker (journalist) (1820–1890), American editor, printer and diplomat
- Beverley D. Tucker (1846–1930), second bishop of the Episcopal Diocese of Southern Virginia
- Beverley Dandridge Tucker Jr. (1882–1969), sixth bishop of the Episcopal Diocese of Ohio
