= Hollerith (surname) =

Hollerith is a surname. Notable people with the surname include:

- Herman Hollerith (1860–1929), German-American statistician, inventor, and businessman
- Herman Hollerith IV (born 1955), American Episcopal bishop
- Randolph Hollerith (born 1963), American Episcopal priest
