= Francis Bland Tucker =

Francis Bland Tucker (January 6, 1895 – January 1, 1984) was an American Bible scholar, priest and hymn writer.

== Early and family life ==
Born in Norfolk, Virginia in 1895, Bland Tucker was the youngest of 13 children. His father, the Rev. Beverley Dandridge Tucker, had become rector of historic St. Paul's Church and soon helped establish Colonial Williamsburg, including the St. George Tucker House, named for an ancestor. St. George Tucker (1752–1827) had been a distinguished lawyer, legal scholar, state and federal judge during and after the American Revolutionary War. In fact, both sides of Tucker's family were among the First Families of Virginia. His mother, Anna Maria Washington, was a collateral descendant of the first U.S. president, and one of the last children born at Mount Vernon before it became a museum. Several family members also became priests and missionaries. His eldest brother Henry St. George Tucker (1874–1959) became 19th Presiding Bishop of the Episcopal Church. Beverley Dandridge Tucker Jr. (1882-1969) became bishop of the Episcopal Diocese of Ohio in 1932 (and retired in 1952).

F. Bland Tucker attended the University of Virginia and graduated from that institution and the Virginia Theological Seminary. He married Mary (Polly) Goldsborough Laird (1890-1972), daughter of the Rev. Henry Laird of Brookville, Maryland.

== Ministry ==
Upon being ordained, the Rev. Bland Tucker served at St. John's Church in Georgetown (Washington, District of Columbia).

Beginning in 1945, he served for 22 years as Rector of Christ Church in Savannah, Georgia, then was named "rector emeritus" and told he could live in the rectory for the rest of his life. A few months after his arrival at Christ Church, Tucker received an offer to become bishop of North Carolina. Although two of his brothers were bishops, he declined, preferring to become a simple parish priest. In 1953, the Forward Movement published More than Conquerors, a collection of Tucker's letters to his congregation, including about his seemingly miraculous recovery from lung cancer while awaiting surgery at Emory University in Atlanta, Georgia.

During the Civil Rights controversies relatively early in his Savannah ministry, Tucker refused to condone the practice of white churches excluding people at services for fear of "kneel-ins." Instead, he retorted, "I would not presume to speculate as to why my own parishioners come to church, much less someone I do not know," so Christ Church's doors remained open to any who wished to enter, during his official ministry that ended in 1967, and to the present day.

Although Tucker quipped that he preferred the 1892 version of the Book of Common Prayer, which he learned in his youth, and was well aware of the controversies that accompanied adoption of the 1928 version, he became a theological advisor to the commission that produced the 1979 Book of Common Prayer.

Bland Tucker also served on the two commissions, forty-two years apart, that revised hymnals of the Episcopal Church, and in his later years wrote hymns and translated others from Greek. The 1982 Episcopal Convention overwhelmingly approved the revised Hymnal which includes 17 of Tucker's contributions. Among these are the texts, Oh, Gracious Light (Hymns 25–26), Father, We Thank Thee Who Hast Planted (Hymns 302–303), and his original text, Our Father, by Whose Name (Hymn 587). Only John Mason Neale is credited with more items in the 1982 Hymnal.

== Death and legacy ==
F. Bland Tucker died on New Year's Day, 1984. Bishop Reeves conducted the funeral (which featured many hymns that Tucker had composed) and noted his friend's passing as the "end of an era." Tucker was buried at Savannah's historic Bonaventure Cemetery beside his beloved wife, whom he had survived for a dozen years. In 1999, the Rt. Rev. Henry I. Louttit, who had become the Bishop of Georgia, placed Tucker on a list of local saints remembered in the diocese.
