= Arthur C. Thomson =

American prelate

The Right Reverend Arthur Conover Thomson
- Bishop of Southern Virginia
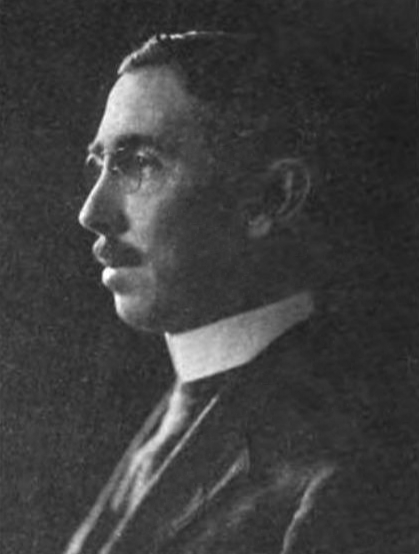
- Church: Episcopal Church
- Diocese: Southern Virginia
- In office: 1930–1937
- Predecessor: Beverley D. Tucker
- Successor: William A. Brown
- Previous posts: Suffragan Bishop of Southern Virginia (1917-1919); Coadjutor Bishop of Southern Virginia (1919-1930)

Orders
- Ordination: April 25, 1895 by Francis McNeece Whittle
- Consecration: September 27, 1917 by Daniel S. Tuttle

Personal details
- Born: April 16, 1871 Fredericksburg, Virginia, United States
- Died: December 16, 1946 (aged 75) Miami, Florida, United States]
- Buried: Portsmouth, Virginia
- Denomination: Anglican
- Parents: Elliot Heber Thomson, Jeanette Risdelle Conover
- Spouse: Mary Grayson Fitzhugh (m. 1893)

Arthur Conover Thomson (April 16, 1871 – December 16, 1946) was an American prelate who served as the third Bishop of Southern Virginia between 1930 and 1937.

== Early life and education ==
Thomson was born on April 16, 1871, in Fredericksburg, Virginia, the son of the Reverend Elliot Heber Thomson and Jeanette Risdelle Conover. His father served as Archdeacon of Shanghai in China and spent over 43 years on the mission field there. Thomson spent much of his childhood in China before attending Cheltenham Academy in Philadelphia. He studied at the University of Pennsylvania between 1887 and 1890 and graduated with a Bachelor of Arts in 1890. He then studied at the Virginia Theological Seminary and graduated in 1893. That same year he married Mary Grayson Fitzhugh. He was awarded a Doctor of Divinity in 1915 by the Virginia Theological Seminary.

== Ordained ministry ==
In June 1893, Thomson was ordained deacon and became rector of South Farnham Parish in Tappahannock, Virginia. On April 25, 1895, he was ordained a priest by Bishop Francis McNeece Whittle of Virginia at St. George's Church, Fredericksburg, Virginia. In 1895 he became rector of the Church of the Resurrection in Cincinnati, Ohio. He then served as rector of Trinity Church in Portsmouth, Virginia, between 1899 and 1917.

== Bishop ==
Thomson was elected Suffragan Bishop of Southern Virginia in 1917 and was consecrated on September 27, 1917, by Presiding Bishop Daniel S. Tuttle at Trinity Church, Portsmouth, Virginia. On May 26, 1919, he was elected Coadjutor Bishop of Southern Virginia. On January 17, 1930, he succeeded as diocesan Bishop of Southern Virginia. He retained the post until his retirement on October 9, 1937. After retirement he served as assistant to the bishop of South Florida.
