= William A. Brown (bishop) =

20th century American Episcopalian Bishop

The Right Reverend William A. Brown
- Bishop of Southern Virginia
- Church: Episcopal Church
- Diocese: Southern Virginia
- Elected: 1938
- In office: 1938–1950
- Predecessor: Arthur C. Thomson
- Successor: George P. Gunn

Orders
- Ordination: May 29, 1902 by Alfred Magill Randolph
- Consecration: May 3, 1938 by Henry St. George Tucker

Personal details
- Born: January 3, 1878 Albemarle County, Virginia, United States
- Died: July 12, 1965 (aged 87)
- Denomination: Anglican
- Parents: Henry William Brown, Sarah Slade Runyard
- Spouse: Mary Ramsey (m.1902); Winifred Washington Watts (m.1938)
- Children: 2

William Ambrose Brown (January 3, 1878 – July 12, 1965) was an American bishop who served as the fourth Bishop of Southern Virginia between 1938 and 1950.

== Early life and education ==
Brown was born in Albemarle County, Virginia, on January 3, 1878, the son of Henry William Brown and Sarah Slade Runyard, who emigrated to the United States from England in 1872. He was educated at the public schools of Danville, Virginia, before traveling to Salem, and graduated with a Bachelor of Arts in 1898 from Roanoke College, which awarded him a Master of Arts degree in 1901. During his schooling, the previous Episcopal Diocese of Virginia (which had encompassed the entire state since its inception) split twice, first in 1892 creating the Diocese of Southern Virginia, which contemplated splitting its western parishes (including Danville and Salem) into the Diocese of Southwestern Virginia. In 1902 Brown completed his education in Alexandria, graduating with a Bachelor of Divinity from the Virginia Theological Seminary. That alma mater awarded him a Doctor of Divinity degree in 1917. Rt.Rev. Brown later received an honorary Doctor of Laws degree from his other alma mater, Roanoke College, in 1938.

== Ordained ministry ==
Brown was ordained deacon in 1901 and priest on May 29, 1902, by Bishop Alfred Magill Randolph of Southern Virginia. He first served as rector of Christ Church in Blacksburg, Virginia and in 1902 became rector of Magill Memorial Church in Pulaski, Virginia. In 1904 Rev. Brown traveled to the state's Tidewater region and became rector of St. John's Church in Portsmouth, Virginia, and continued in that post for more than three decades, through the ministries of three diocesan bishops as well as the First World War (in which the Hampton Roads area experienced significant growth) and Great Depression, until his election as bishop in 1938. His daughter, Mary Brown Channel, would go on to design additions to that historic church during her architectural career.

== Episcopacy ==
Brown was elected Bishop of Southern Virginia 1938 and was consecrated on May 3, 1938, by Presiding Bishop Henry St. George Tucker at St John's Church, Portsmouth, Virginia. He retired in May 1950 and died on July 12, 1965.

== Family ==
Brown married twice. His first wife, Mary Ramsey, whom he married in 1902, bore two children, including Mary Brown Channel, the first woman licensed to practice architecture in Virginia.. After her death, the widower Brown remarried, to Winifred Washington Watts in 1938.
