= Beverley Dandridge Tucker Jr. =

American bishop

The Right Reverend Beverley Dandridge Tucker Jr. D.D., LL.D., L.H.D., S.T.D.
- Bishop of Ohio
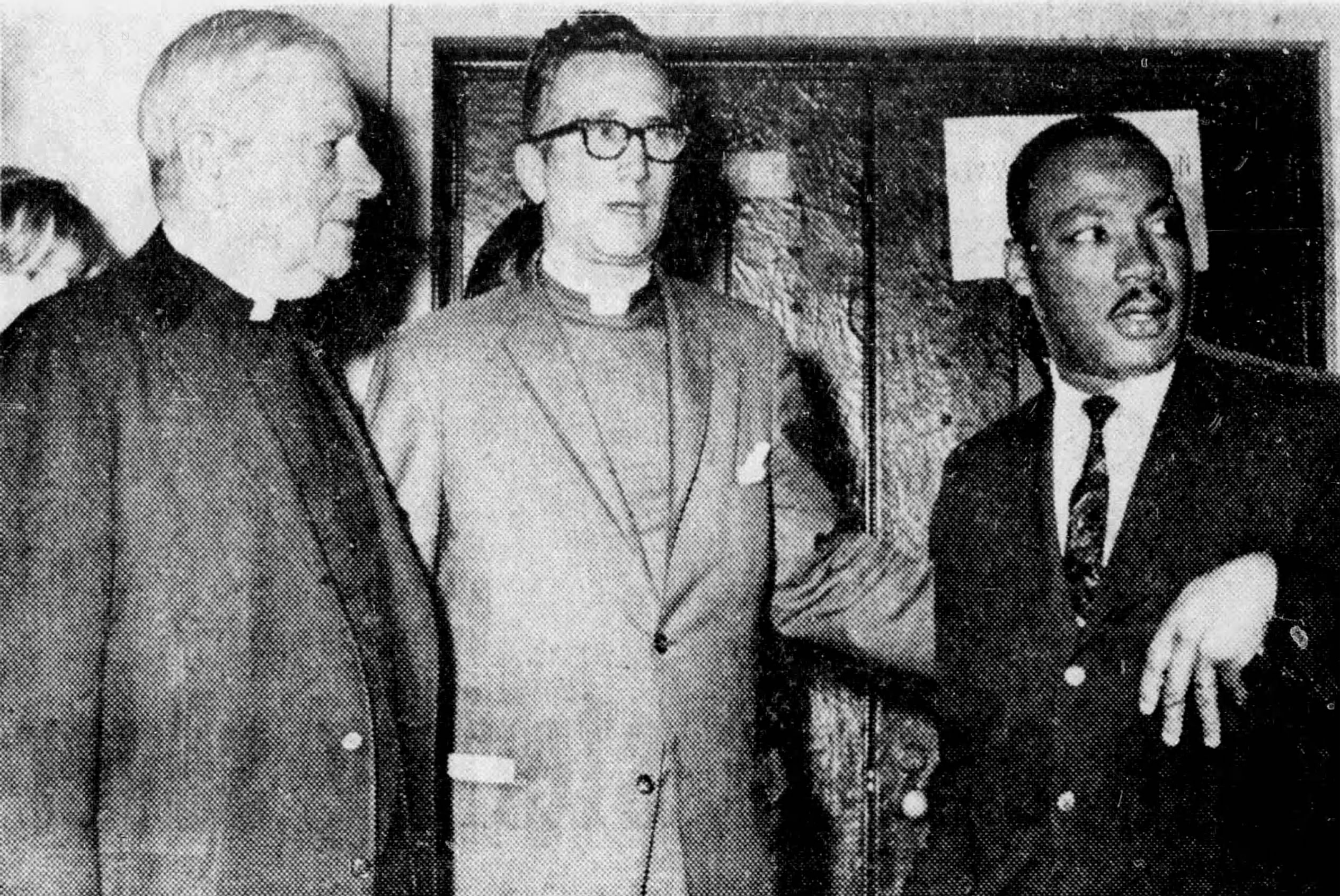
- Rt. Rev. Tucker (left) with Rev. W. Chave McCracken and Rev. Dr. Martin Luther King Jr. in 1963
- Church: Episcopal Church
- Diocese: Ohio
- Appointed: May 24, 1938
- In office: 1938–1952
- Predecessor: Warren Lincoln Rogers
- Successor: Nelson M. Burroughs
- Previous post: Coadjutor Bishop of Ohio (1938)

Orders
- Ordination: March 12, 1909 by Alfred Magill Randolph
- Consecration: September 28, 1938 by Henry St. George Tucker

Personal details
- Born: February 4, 1882 Warsaw, Virginia, United States
- Died: July 4, 1969 (aged 87) Cleveland, Ohio, United States
- Buried: University of Virginia Cemetery
- Denomination: Anglican
- Parents: Beverley D. Tucker & Anna Maria Washington
- Spouse: Eleanor Carson Lile (m. 1915)
- Children: 5
- Education: University of Virginia; Oxford University
- Alma mater: Virginia Theological Seminary

Beverley Dandridge Tucker Jr. (February 4, 1882 – July 4, 1969), was Rhodes Scholar who became sixth bishop of the Episcopal Diocese of Ohio, serving from 1938 to 1952 and continuing to work for ecumenism and interracial harmony after his retirement.

== Biography ==
His ancestors were among the First Families of Virginia. His father, Beverley Dandridge Tucker Sr. was an Episcopal priest who had served in the Confederate States Army and as chaplain of a Confederate veterans group as well as small parishes in Virginia's Northern Neck, and later helped establish Colonial Williamsburg and became the second bishop of the Southern Virginia. Two of his brothers became missionaries in China and Japan. His eldest brother Henry St. George Tucker became the second Missionary Bishop of Kyoto, but returned to his home state and became Bishop of the Diocese of Virginia and later Presiding Bishop of the Episcopal Church. His youngest brother Francis Bland Tucker turned down an invitation to become bishop of North Carolina, but distinguished himself as a parish priest in Savannah, Georgia, as a theologian helping to revise the Book of Common Prayer as well as wrote many hymns included in the Hymnal 1982.

This Rt. Rev. Tucker graduated from University of Virginia in 1902 and from the Virginia Theological Seminary in 1905. He became a Rhodes Scholar and studied at Oxford University, earning a B.A. (1908) and M.A. (1912). Tucker worked as a parish priest (rector) in Charlottesville, Virginia from 1908 to 1920 (at St. Paul's Memorial Episcopal Church near the UVa campus). He was also scoutmaster of Boy Scout Troop No. 1 at University, Va. beginning in 1912 for several years. He then briefly served as a professor at VTS (1920-1923) before deciding to resume his priestly calling in Virginia (1923–38). Selected Bishop of Ohio to succeed Warren Lincoln Rogers, Beverley Dandridge Tucker was consecrated by many bishops including his eldest brother, William Loyall Gravatt of West Virginia and Thomas C. Darst of East Carolina.

Bishop Tucker led his diocese through the Great Depression and World War II, fostering education as well as the development of small churches. He served on the boards of trustees of Kenyon College, Lake Erie College, and Western Reserve University. Nelson M. Burroughs was appointed his co-adjutor in 1949 and succeeded Bishop Tucker when he retired in 1952.

After his retirement, Tucker continued working to foster interracial harmony and ecumenism, including by introducing Rev. Dr. Martin Luther King Jr. at a rally in Cleveland, Ohio in 1963.
