= Charles Vaché =

American bishop (1926–2009)

The Right Reverend Claude Charles Vaché D.D.
- Bishop of Southern Virginia
- Church: Episcopal Church
- Diocese: Southern Virginia
- In office: 1978–1991
- Predecessor: David Rose
- Successor: Frank Vest
- Previous post: Coadjutor Bishop of Southern Virginia (1976-1978)

Orders
- Ordination: June 11, 1953 by George P. Gunn
- Consecration: May 29, 1976 by John Allin

Personal details
- Born: August 4, 1926 New Bern, North Carolina, United States
- Died: November 1, 2009 (aged 83) Virginia Beach, Virginia, United States
- Buried: Trinity Episcopal Church (Portsmouth, Virginia)
- Denomination: Anglican
- Parents: Jean Andrew Vaché & Edith Fitzwilson
- Education: University of North Carolina at Chapel Hill

Claude Charles Vaché (August 4, 1926 – November 1, 2009) was an American prelate of The Episcopal Church, who served as the seventh Bishop of Southern Virginia.

== Early life and education ==
Born in New Bern, North Carolina, Vaché was the son of the Reverend Jean Andrew Vaché, an Episcopal priest and his wife Edith Fitzwilson. He served in the U.S. Navy as World War II ended, and then received a Bachelor of Arts with honors from the University of North Carolina, Chapel Hill, where he was elected to the Phi Beta Kappa society. He graduated from the Seabury-Western Theological Seminary in Evanston, Illinois in 1952 with a Master of Divinity.

== Ministry ==
Bishop George P. Gunn of Southern Virginia ordained Vaché deacon on June 11, 1952, in Johns Memorial Church in Farmville, Virginia. He then served as deacon-in-charge and later rector of St Michael's Church in Bon Air, Virginia, following his ordination as priest on June 11, 1953, also by Rt. Rev. Gunn. During this time, he also served as chaplain to St. Christopher's School in nearby Richmond, the state capital. Called as rector of Trinity Episcopal Church in Portsmouth in 1957, Rev. Vaché served as its rector for 19 years, including during Virginia's Massive Resistance crisis, during which the Byrd Organization opposed integration of Virginia's schools (and one of the companion cases to Brown v. Board of Education involved Farmville's schools). Rev. Vaché came to embrace television, giving weekly theological commentary on a local station, as well as served on the original board of directors of Westminster Canterbury retirement home in Virginia Beach, and numerous other posts in the diocese. In 1962, he also published a bicentennial history of the historic Portsmouth parish (founded in the 17th century).

In view of the pending retirement of the bishop, the diocesan convention of clergy and laity elected Vaché Coadjutor Bishop of Southern Virginia in 1976. Presiding Bishop John Allin, bishop David Rose of Southern Virginia, and William Creighton of Washington, D.C. led the consecration service on May 29, 1976, in the Hampton Coliseum in Hampton, Virginia. Rt. Rev. Vaché then succeeded as diocesan bishop on March 31, 1978, and served in that post till 1991. Although Vaché initially opposed ordaining women, he ordained Susan Blount Bowman and Jacqueline Segar Gravatt as deacons in 1985, and became an advocate of allowing women to become priests. He also worked with fellow veterans such as VMI graduate and former Navy officer Rev. James Holt Newsom, Jr., who after a business career, became a priest and eventually rector of historic St. Paul's Church in Suffolk, Virginia for 29 years.

After his retirement from the Diocese of Southern Virginia (and the accession of Frank Vest as his successor), Vaché continued his ministry of reconciliation. Following the retirement of other bishops, he assisted the Diocese of East Carolina (1993-1996) and later the Episcopal Diocese of West Virginia (1999-2001), each time as interim bishop. Rt. Rev. Vaché also served as chaplain of St. George's College in Jerusalem (as well as a trustee for many years), and also as dean of St. George's Cathedral during a period of especial tension between Jews, Muslims and Christians in the holy city. He also ministered at points in his retirement in his own diocese, particularly at historic Bruton Parish in Williamsburg (1996-1999) as well as the Church of the Good Shepherd in Norfolk (2003-2004).

== Death and legacy ==
During his final years, Vaché suffered from Alzheimer's disease and lived at an assisted living facility in Virginia Beach. He died on November 1, 2009, and following his wishes, he was buried the following Friday at Trinity Episcopal Church in Portsmouth.
