= Herman Hollerith =

American statistician and inventor

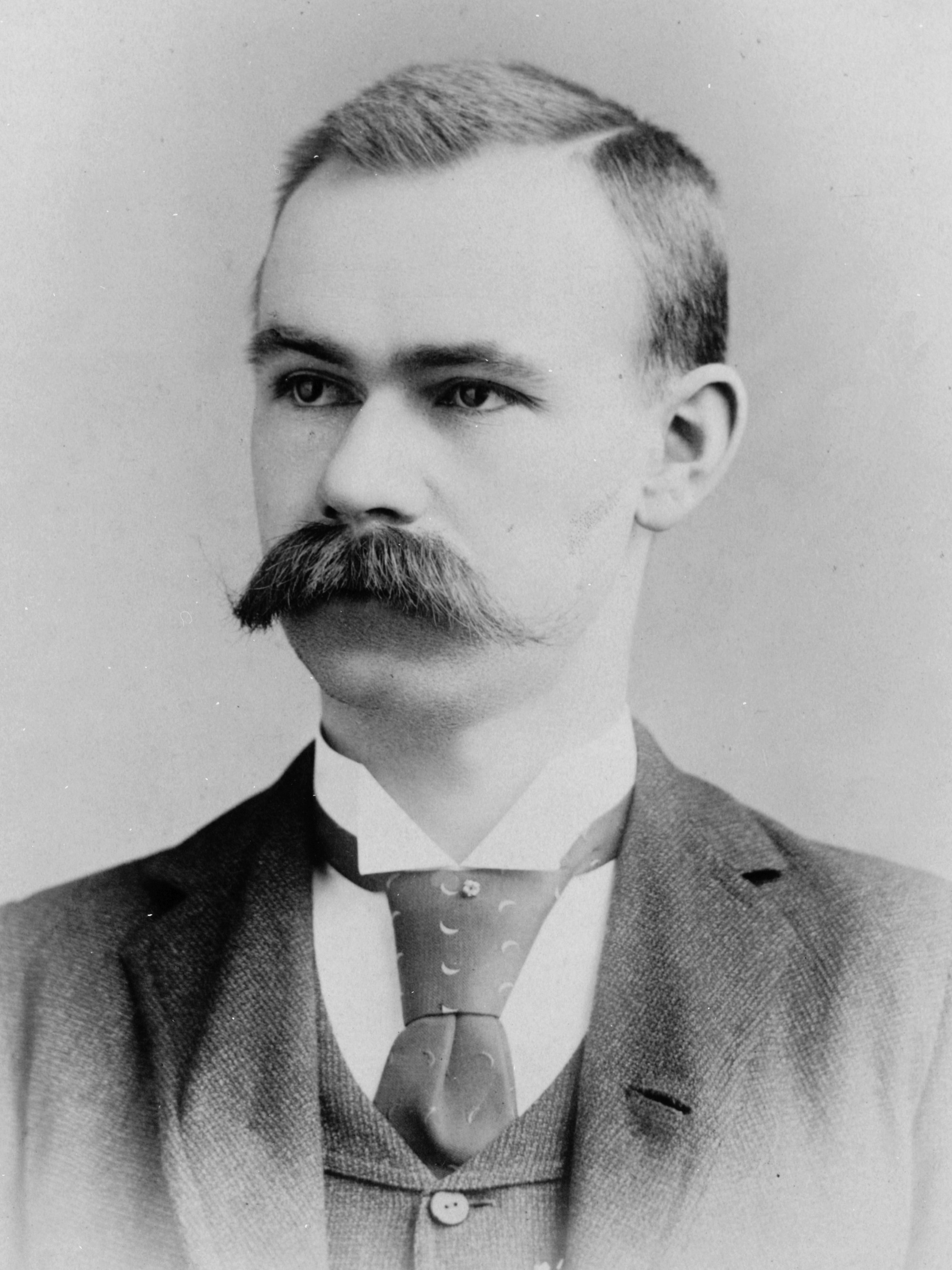
- Hollerith c. 1888
- Born: February 29, 1860; Buffalo, New York, U.S.
- Died: November 17, 1929 (aged 69); Washington, D.C., U.S.
- Resting place: Oak Hill Cemetery
- Education: City College of New York; Columbia University (BEng, PhD)
- Occupations: Statistician; inventor; businessman
- Known for: Electromechanical tabulation of punched card data; IBM
- Spouse: Lucia Beverly (Talcott) Hollerith
- Children: 6
- Awards: Elliott Cresson Medal (1890); World's Columbian Exposition, Bronze Medal (1892); National Inventors Hall of Fame (1990)

Herman Hollerith (February 29, 1860 – November 17, 1929) was a German-American statistician, inventor, and businessman who developed an electromechanical tabulating machine for punched cards to assist in summarizing information and, later, in accounting. His invention of the punched card tabulating machine, patented in 1884, marks the beginning of the era of mechanized binary code and semiautomatic data processing systems, and his concept dominated that landscape for nearly a century.

Hollerith founded a company that was amalgamated in 1911 with several other companies to form the Computing-Tabulating-Recording Company. In 1924, the company was renamed "International Business Machines" (IBM) and became one of the largest and most successful companies of the 20th century. Hollerith is regarded as one of the seminal figures in the development of data processing.

== Biography ==
Herman Hollerith was born in Buffalo, New York, in 1860, where he also spent his early childhood. His parents were German immigrants; his father, Forty-eighter Georg Hollerith, was a school teacher and Lutheran minister from Großfischlingen, then Bavarian Palatinate, today Rhineland-Palatinate. He entered the City College of New York in 1875, graduated from the Columbia School of Mines with an Engineer of Mines degree in 1879 at age 19, and, in 1890, earned a Doctor of Philosophy based on his development of the tabulating system. In 1882, Hollerith joined the Massachusetts Institute of Technology where he taught mechanical engineering and conducted his first experiments with punched cards. He eventually moved to Washington, D.C., living in Georgetown with a home on 29th Street and a business building at 31st Street and the Chesapeake and Ohio Canal, where today there is a commemorative plaque installed by IBM. He died of a heart attack in Washington, D.C., at age 69.

== Electromechanical tabulation of data ==
At the suggestion of John Shaw Billings, Hollerith developed a mechanism using electrical connections to increment a counter, recording information. A key idea was that a datum could be recorded by the presence or absence of a hole at a specific location on a card. For example, if a specific hole location indicates marital status, then a hole there can indicate married while not having a hole indicates single. Hollerith determined that data in specified locations on a card, arranged in rows and columns, could be counted or sorted electromechanically. A description of this system, An Electric Tabulating System (1889), was submitted by Hollerith to Columbia University as his doctoral thesis, and is reprinted in Brian Randell's 1982 The Origins of Digital Computers, Selected Papers. On January 8, 1889, Hollerith was issued U.S. Patent 395,782, claim 2 of which reads:

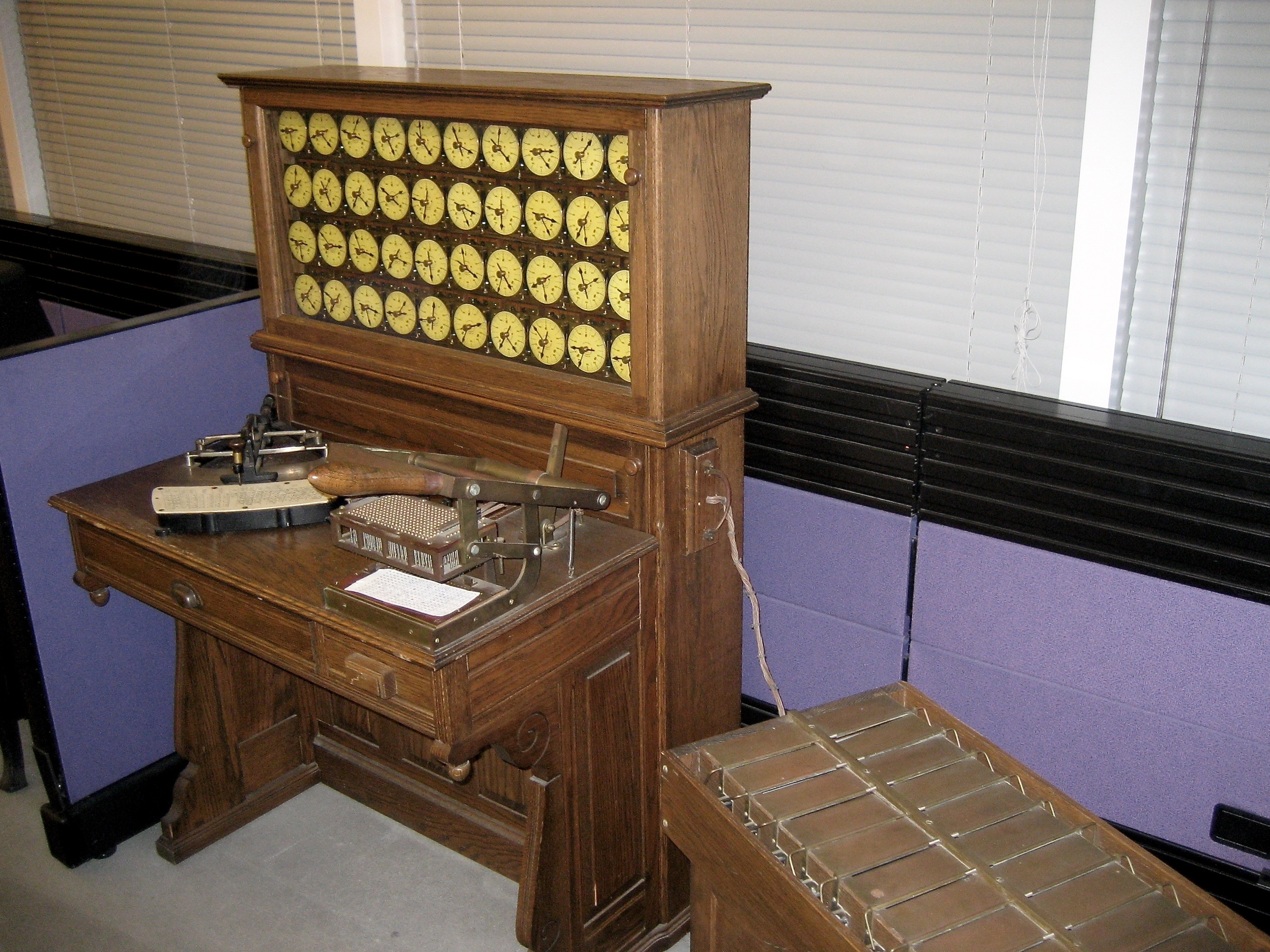
Replica of Hollerith tabulating machine with sorting box, c. 1890. The "sorting box" was an adjunct to, and controlled by, the tabulator. The "sorter", an independent machine, was a later development.

The herein-described method of compiling statistics, which consists in recording separate statistical items pertaining to the individual by holes or combinations of holes punched in sheets of electrically non-conducting material, and bearing a specific relation to each other and to a standard, and then counting or tallying such statistical items separately or in combination by means of mechanical counters operated by electro-magnets the circuits through which are controlled by the perforated sheets, substantially as and for the purpose set forth.

== Inventions and businesses ==
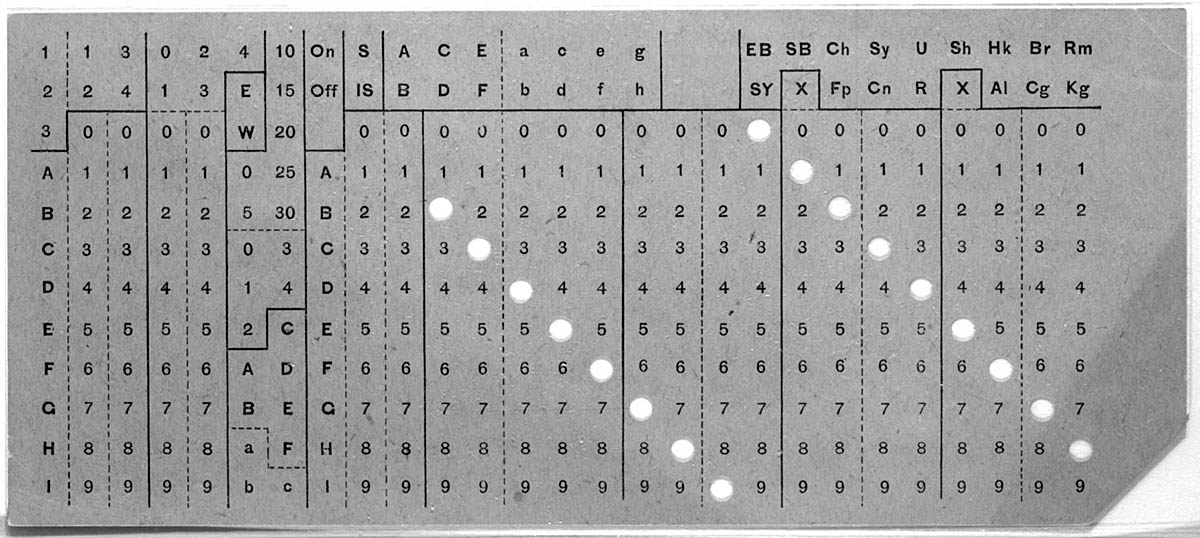
Hollerith punched card

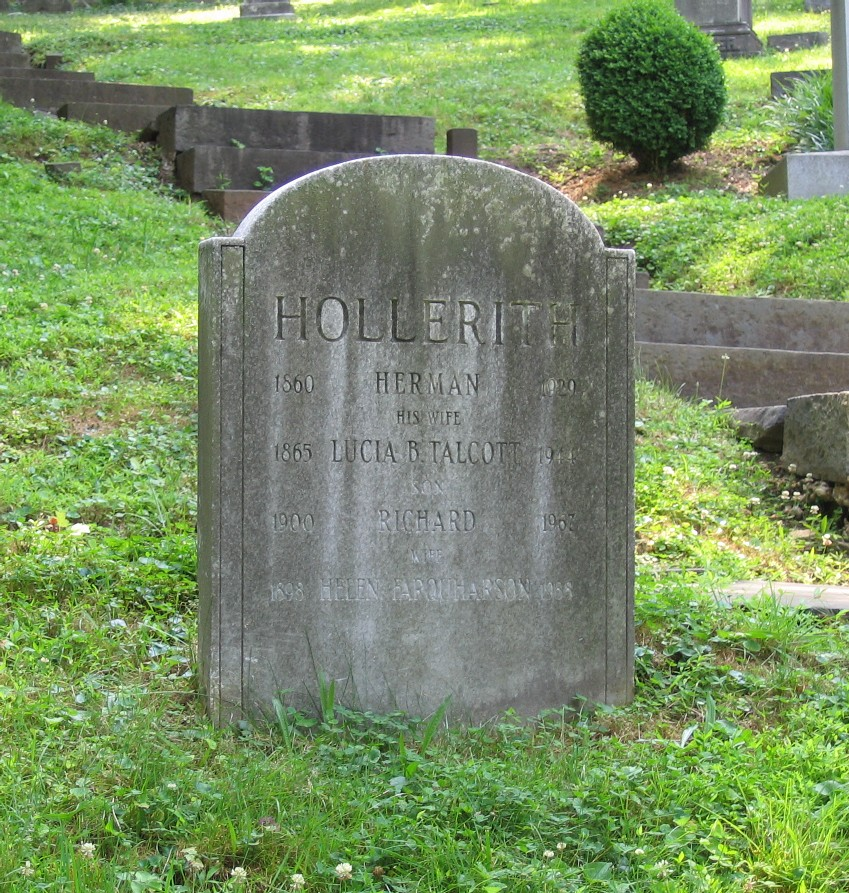
Hollerith's grave at Oak Hill Cemetery in Georgetown in Washington, D.C.

Hollerith had left teaching and began working for the United States Census Bureau in the year he filed his first patent application. Titled "Art of Compiling Statistics", it was filed on September 23, 1884; U.S. Patent 395,782 was granted on January 8, 1889.

Hollerith initially did business under his own name, as The Hollerith Electric Tabulating System, specializing in punched card data processing equipment. He provided tabulators and other machines under contract for the Census Office, which used them for the 1890 census. The net effect of the many changes from the 1880 census: the larger population, the data items to be collected, the Census Bureau headcount, the scheduled publications, and the use of Hollerith's electromechanical tabulators, reduced the time required to process the census from eight years for the 1880 census to six years for the 1890 census.

In 1896, Hollerith founded the Tabulating Machine Company (in 1905 renamed The Tabulating Machine Company). Many major census bureaus around the world leased his equipment and purchased his cards, as did major insurance companies. Hollerith's machines were used for censuses in England & Wales, Italy, Germany, Russia, Austria, Canada, France, Norway, Puerto Rico, Cuba, and the Philippines, and again in the 1900 U.S. census.

He invented the first automatic card-feed mechanism and the first keypunch. The 1890 Tabulator was hardwired to operate on 1890 Census cards. A control panel in his 1906 Type I Tabulator simplified rewiring for different jobs. The 1920s removable control panel supported prewiring and near instant job changing. These inventions were among the foundations of the data processing industry, and Hollerith's punched cards (later used for computer input/output) continued in use for almost a century.

In 1911, four corporations, including Hollerith's firm, were amalgamated to form a fifth company, the Computing-Tabulating-Recording Company (CTR). Under the presidency of Thomas J. Watson, CTR was renamed International Business Machines Corporation (IBM) in 1924. By 1933 The Tabulating Machine Company name had disappeared as subsidiary companies were subsumed by IBM.

== Death and legacy ==
Herman Hollerith died November 17, 1929. Hollerith is buried at Oak Hill Cemetery in the Georgetown neighborhood of Washington, D.C.

Hollerith cards were named after Herman Hollerith, as were Hollerith strings and Hollerith constants.

His great-grandson, the Rt. Rev. Herman Hollerith IV, was the Episcopal bishop of the Diocese of Southern Virginia, and another great-grandson, Randolph Marshall Hollerith, is an Episcopal priest and the dean of Washington National Cathedral in Washington, D.C.

== See also ==
- Unit record equipment
- History of IBM
- List of pioneers in computer science
