= David Rose (bishop) =

American bishop

The Right Reverend David Shepherd Rose D.D.
- Bishop of Southern Virginia
- Church: Episcopal Church
- Diocese: Southern Virginia
- In office: 1971–1978
- Predecessor: George P. Gunn
- Successor: Charles Vaché
- Previous posts: Suffragan Bishop of Southern Virginia (1958-1964); Coadjutor Bishop of Southern Virginia (1964-1971)

Orders
- Ordination: April 1939 by James M. Maxon
- Consecration: September 16, 1958 by Henry Knox Sherrill

Personal details
- Born: March 10, 1913 Nashville, Tennessee, United States
- Died: November 19, 1997 (aged 84) Tallahassee, Florida, United States
- Buried: Bruton Parish Church
- Denomination: Anglican
- Parents: Charles Solon Rose & Amy Payne
- Spouse: Frances Lewis Luce (m.1947)
- Children: 1
- Education: Sewanee: The University of the South

David Shepherd Rose (March 10, 1913 – November 19, 1997) was an American prelate who served as the sixth Bishop of Southern Virginia between 1971 and 1978.

== Early life and education ==
Rose was born on March 10, 1913, in Nashville, Tennessee, the son of Charles Solon Rose and Amy Payne. He could trace his ancestry to Rev. Robert Rose who emigrated from Scotland to the Virginia colony in 1725 and established churches in what became southwestern Virginia, as well as John Sevier (Tennessee's first governor) and James Robertson (one of the founders of Nashville).

Rose attended Hume-Fogg High School before traveling to Sewanee for college. He graduated from Sewanee: The University of the South with a Bachelor of Arts in 1936. In 1938 he also graduated from the School of Theology of the same university with a Bachelor of Divinity. He married Frances Lewis Luce on January 6, 1947, and together had one son. In 1958 he spent some months studying at St Augustine's College, Canterbury. He was awarded a Doctor of Divinity from the Virginia Theological Seminary on October 13, 1959.

== Ordained ministry ==
Rose was ordained deacon on April 10, 1938, by Bishop James M. Maxon of Tennessee, in Christ Church, Nashville, Tennessee. He then became assistant at the Cathedral of St Mary in Memphis, Tennessee, where he remained until his ordination to the priesthood in April 1939 by Bishop Maxon. Between 1939 and 1943 he served as associate rector of Christ Church in Pensacola, Florida and priest-in-charge of St John's Church in Warrington, Florida, St Mary's Church in Milton, Florida and St Andrews-by-the-Sea in Destin, Florida. During WWII he served as an army chaplain. In 1946 he became assistant to the Bishop of Florida, while in 1948 he became rector of the Church of the Good Shepherd in Corpus Christi, Texas.

== Bishop ==
On May 7, 1958, Rose was elected Suffragan Bishop of Southern Virginia during a diocesan convention. He was consecrated bishop on September 16, 1958, by Presiding Bishop Henry Knox Sherrill. He was then elected Coadjutor Bishop of Southern Virginia in 1964 and then succeeded as diocesan bishop in 1971. During his time as bishop, he was co-founder of the Church of the Holy Apostles in Virginia Beach, together with Bishop Walter Francis Sullivan of Richmond, where Catholics and Episcopalians worship together. Plans were first conceived in 1974 and the church opened in 1977. He retired in 1978 and died on November 19, 1997, in Tallahassee, Florida.
