= The Partisan Leader =

1836 novel by Nathaniel Beverley Tucker

The Partisan Leader: A Tale of the Future
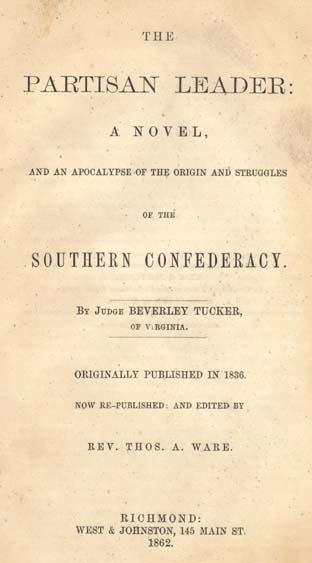
- Title page of the 1862 Confederate edition
- Author: Nathaniel Beverley Tucker
- Language: English
- Genre: Political novel
- Publisher: Duff Green
- Publication date: 1836
- Publication place: United States
- Media type: Print (Hardback & Paperback)
- Pages: 392

The Partisan Leader; A Tale of The Future is a political novel by the antebellum Virginia author and jurist Nathaniel Beverley Tucker. A two-volume work first published in 1836 in New York City by Duff Green under the pen-name Edward William Sydney, the novel is set thirteen years into the future, in 1849, and imagines a world where tyrannical four-term president Martin Van Buren oppresses the Southern United States, and the American states south of Virginia secede from the Union. The story traces the formation of a band of Virginia insurgents who seek to free their state from federal control and adjoin it to the independent Southern Confederacy.

Following the actual secession of the Southern states, it has been viewed as a window into the development of secessionist thought, and, in some ways, a preview of the American Civil War.

== Synopsis ==
The novel is set thirteen years into the future, in 1849, and imagines a world where a tyrannical, corrupt Martin Van Buren, serving his fourth term as president, spearheads a conspiracy to "subdue the spirit" of the Southern United States. As a result, the American states south of Virginia (South Carolina, North Carolina, Georgia, Louisiana, Texas, Arkansas, Mississippi, and Florida) have seceded from the Union. The story traces the formation of a band of Virginia guerilla insurgents who seek to free their state from federal control and adjoin it to the independent Southern Confederacy.

== Publication history ==
It was written by Nathaniel Beverley Tucker, a writer and Fire-Eater (pro-slavery secessionist advocate). was initially published as a two-volume work in 1836 in New York City by Duff Green under the pen-name Edward William Sydney. It was reprinted in 1837 in Washington, D.C.

In 1861, it was reprinted in New York City by Rudd & Carleton with the title A Key to the Disunion Conspiracy, further adding of the book that it was "Secretly Printed in Washington (in the year 1836) ... but afterwards suppressed". Northerners presented the book as proof that Southerners had been planning their succession for decades. A Confederate edition was published in Richmond in 1862 by West & Johnston. The Confederate edition was also retitled, but to The Partisan Leader: A Novel, and an Apocalypse of the Origin and Struggles of the Southern Confederacy, suggesting that the book was literally prophetic.

== Analysis and legacy ==
Following its republication in 1861, The New York Times wrote of the work that it was a "curious book, prophetic of the whole secession movement". Ever since the Southern states actually withdrew from the Union in 1861, the work has been viewed as a window into the development of secessionist thought, and, in some ways, a preview of the American Civil War.

The novel was noted for its uncharacteristically negative depiction of the Supreme Court of the United States for its time, depicting Van Buren as using "the servile Judge Baker of the Supreme Court" as a tool through which to exercise power. Terrorism scholar J.M. Berger said of the depiction of Van Buren that it bore "comically little resemblance" to the real man, who was a single-term president.

Pro-slavery activist Edmund Ruffin read the book; he composed a similar dystopian propaganda work, Anticipations of the Future, in 1860.

== Bibliography ==
- Robert J. Brugger, Beverley Tucker: Heart over Head in the Old South (Baltimore: Johns Hopkins University Press, 1977).
- Beverley D. Tucker, Nathaniel Beverley Tucker: Prophet of the Confederacy, 1784-1851 (Tokyo: Nan'undo, 1979).
