= Old Norfolk City Hall =

- U.S. National Register of Historic Places
- Virginia Landmarks Register
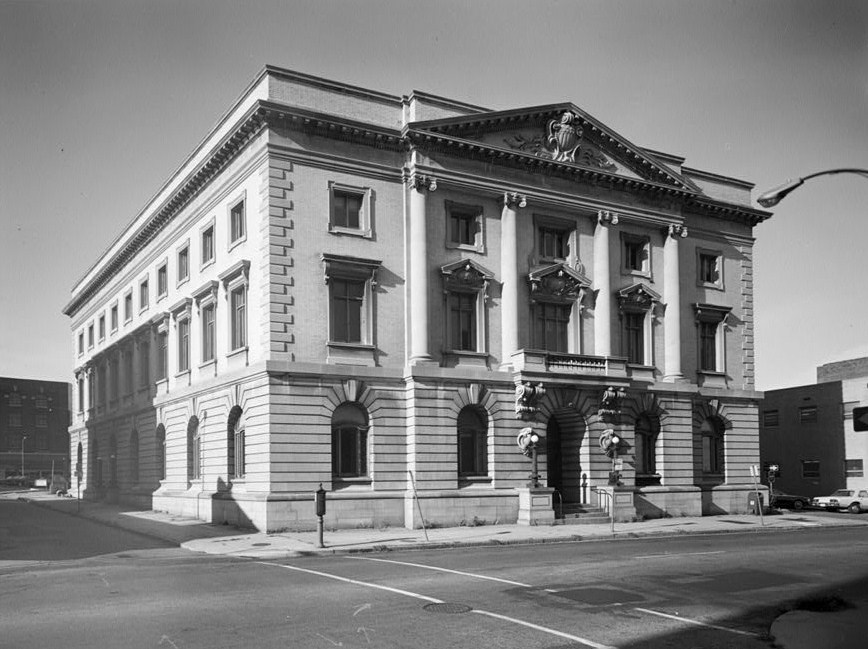
- Old Norfolk City Hall & Courthouse, HABS Photo, August 1981

- Location within Virginia Location within the United States
- Location: 235 E. Plume St., Norfolk, Virginia
- Coordinates: 36.8467°N 76.2903°W
- Area: 0.5 acres (0.20 ha)
- Built: 1898–1900
- Architect: Wyatt & Nolting
- Architectural style: Neo-Palladian Revival
- NRHP reference No.: 81000674
- VLR No.: 122-0082

Significant dates
- Added to NRHP: October 29, 1981
- Designated VLR: July 21, 1981

Old Norfolk City Hall, also known as the Seaboard Building and U.S. Post Office and Courthouse, is a historic city hall located at Norfolk, Virginia. It was built in 1898–1900, and is a three-story faced with rusticated stone and yellow brick in a Neo-Palladian Revival style. It features a central pedimented engaged portico with Corinthian order pilasters that contains the main entrance. The building housed a post office and Federal courts until they moved to the Walter E. Hoffman United States Courthouse about 1935. Title to the building was transferred from the U.S. government to the city of Norfolk in 1937, when it was converted into a city hall.

It was listed on the National Register of Historic Places in 1981. In 2009, it became Norfolk's main library. In 2014, the library was expanded to become the Slover Branch/Downtown Norfolk Public Library; the expansion included construction of a new atrium connecting the former city hall with the neighboring Selden Arcade. The library is named in honor of Samuel L. Slover, former mayor of Norfolk.
