= James R. Moodey =

The Right Reverend James Russell Moodey D.D.
- Bishop of Ohio
- Church: Episcopal Church
- Diocese: Ohio
- Elected: December 11, 1982
- In office: 1983–1993
- Predecessor: John H. Burt
- Successor: J. Clark Grew II
- Previous post: Coadjutor Bishop of Ohio (1983)

Orders
- Ordination: January 5, 1958 by Henry Hobson
- Consecration: June 18, 1983 by John Allin

Personal details
- Born: December 9, 1932 Brooklyn, New York City, New York, United States
- Died: September 5, 2005 (aged 72) Damariscotta, Maine, United States
- Denomination: Anglican
- Parents: John Reginald Moodey & Matil Cochran
- Spouse: Penelope Hall Moodey (m. 1959)
- Children: 3
- Education: Episcopal Theological School
- Alma mater: Hamilton College

James Russell Moodey (December 9, 1932 – September 5, 2005) was bishop of the Episcopal Diocese of Ohio from 1983 to 1994.

== Early life and education ==
Moodey was born on December 9, 1932, in Brooklyn, New York City, the son of the Reverend John Reginald Moodey (1894-1980) and Matil Cochran (1896-1981). He was educated in the Long Island public schools, before enrolling at Hamilton College, from where graduated with a Bachelor of Arts in 1954. He also studied at the Episcopal Theological School in Cambridge, Massachusetts, and graduated in 1957. While there, he served one summer in Haiti. He received an honorary Doctor of Divinity from Kenyon College, where he served as a trustee from 1984 to 1994, and another from Hamilton College in 1988.

== Ordained ministry ==
Moodey was ordained deacon on June 22, 1957, by Bishop Anson Phelps Stokes of Massachusetts. He was ordained priest on January 5, 1958, by Bishop Henry Hobson of Southern Ohio. He then became assistant at Christ Church in Cincinnati, Ohio. During that time, he met and married Penelope Wallace Hall in 1959. In 1960 he became rector of the Church of the Nativity in New Castle, Delaware, while in 1965, he moved to Scranton, Pennsylvania to serve as rector of St Luke's Church. Between 1976 and 1983, he served as rector of St Paul's Church in Chestnut Hill, Philadelphia.

== Episcopacy ==
On December 11, 1982, during a special diocesan convention, Moodey was elected Coadjutor Bishop of Ohio. He was consecrated on June 18, 1983 with Presiding Bishop John Allin as chief consecrator, and succeeded as diocesan bishop. He founded the Episcopal Community Services Foundation, to provide funds for community ministry. He retired in 1993. In 1996, he became Assistant Bishop of Maine, and served in the diocese till 1997. Moodey died at his home in Damariscotta, Maine on September 5, 2005, after years suffering from metastatic kidney cancer.
