= J. Clark Grew II =

American prelate of the Episcopal Church (born 1939)

The Right Reverend Joseph Clark Grew II D.D.
- Bishop of Ohio
- Church: Episcopal Church
- Diocese: Ohio
- Elected: October 9, 1993
- In office: 1994–2004
- Predecessor: James R. Moodey
- Successor: Mark Hollingsworth

Orders
- Ordination: December 20, 1978 by John Bowen Coburn
- Consecration: March 5, 1994 by Edmond L. Browning

Personal details
- Born: December 20, 1939 (age 86) New York City, New York, United States
- Denomination: Anglican
- Parents: Henry Sturgis Grew, Jr. & Selina Richards Wood
- Spouse: Sarah (Wendy) Loomis (m. 1972)
- Children: 3
- Education: Harvard College; Episcopal Theological School

Joseph Clark Grew II (December 20, 1939 - December 22, 2025) was an American prelate of the Episcopal Church, who served as Bishop of Ohio from 1994 to 2004.

== Early life, education, and naval career ==
Grew was born on December 20, 1939, in New York City, the son of Henry Sturgis Grew, Jr. and Selina Richards Wood. Grew was the great nephew of Joseph Grew, who was an American career diplomat and Foreign Service officer, notably serving as the United States Ambassador to Japan at the time of the Attack on Pearl Harbor. He was educated at St Mark's School in Southborough, Massachusetts and graduated in 1958. He then enrolled in Harvard College, and earned a Bachelor of Arts in 1962. After college, he served in the United States Navy from 1962 to 1967. He also commanded the USS Constitution from June 28, 1965, till April 28, 1967. He became a lieutenant.

== Post-naval career ==
After retiring from the navy, Grew served as a faculty member of Groton School, and then as director of admissions and assistant headmaster, and dean, of the faculty at St Mark's School. On December 27, 1972, he married Sarah (Wendy) Loomis, and together they had three children.

== Ordained ministry ==
Grew then enrolled at the Episcopal Divinity School in Cambridge, Massachusetts to study theology. He graduated with a Master of Divinity in 1978, and was ordained to the diaconate on June 18, 1978, and to the priesthood on December 20, 1978. He served as rector of St John's Church in Westwood, Massachusetts from 1978 to 1982, and then rector of Church of the Holy Spirit in Lake Forest, Illinois from 1982 till 1993.

== Bishop ==
Grew was elected on the fifth ballot as the 10th Bishop of Ohio October 9, 1993, and was consecrated to the episcopate on March 5, 1994, with Presiding Bishop Edmond L. Browning as chief consecrator. During his episcopacy, he promoted ecumenism, dialogue with other dioceses in Ireland, and support for greater inclusion of women, gay, and lesbian Episcopalians in the church. He retired in 2004, and served at Emmanuel Episcopal Church, Boston.
