= Walter E. Hoffman United States Courthouse =

- US Post Office and Courthouse
- U.S. National Register of Historic Places
- Virginia Landmarks Register
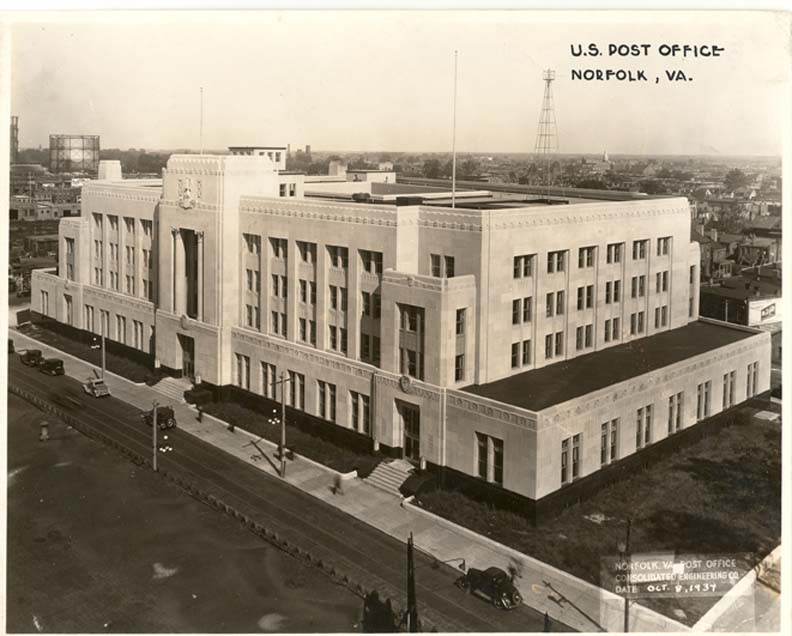
- US Post Office and Courthouse

- Location within Virginia Location within the United States
- Location: 600 Granby St., Norfolk, Virginia
- Coordinates: 36°51′13″N 76°17′19″W
- Area: 1.9 acres (0.77 ha)
- Built: 1932
- Architect: Randolf, Cooke,& Van Leeuwen; Mitchell, Benjamin F.
- Architectural style: Art Deco
- NRHP reference No.: 84000098
- VLR No.: 122-0058

Significant dates
- Added to NRHP: October 10, 1984
- Designated VLR: October 18, 1983

The Walter E. Hoffman United States Courthouse, formerly known as the U.S. Post Office and Courthouse, is a courthouse of the United States District Court for the Eastern District of Virginia in Norfolk, Virginia. Built in 1932, it was listed on the National Register of Historic Places in 1984, reflecting Art Deco architecture. Historically it served as a courthouse and additionally as a post office.

== Significance ==
The courthouse, located in downtown Norfolk, was constructed as a Post Office and Courthouse in 1932–34. Local Norfolk architects, Benjamin F. Mitchell and the firm of Rudolph, Cooke, and VanLeeuwen, were jointly responsible for the architectural design. Although built during the Depression, the building is quite lavish in its design and finishes. Upon its completion, this four-story, gray limestone building was considered at the time to fall "little short of magnificence", according to the local paper, the Virginian-Pilot. The elaborate Art Deco interior is marked with a high level of craftsmanship.

During the first two decades of the twentieth century, the city of Norfolk experienced an explosion of prosperity, in part due to the rapid growth of the Naval Base. The need for a new, larger courthouse and post office was becoming so acute that temporary postal stations were established to handle the overflow of postal congestion. At the time, the courthouse and Post Office were both housed in the circa 1898 Federal Courthouse at 235 E. Plume Street. In 1915, a committee was appointed and headed by Norfolk's Mayor Wyndham R. Mayo to petition Congress for an appropriation of funds for the construction of a new Federal building in the city. The committee included Postmaster Major Clinton L. Wright, as well as many civic and business leaders. This petition was never approved, despite being submitted and resubmitted throughout the 1920s as the need for more space increased. In 1922, funds to acquire temporary housing for mail operations were allocated.

In 1929, Congress made a tentative allocation of $1.15 million for the Norfolk Federal building. Menalcus Lankford, Congressman elect from Norfolk, and Postmaster Major Wright, successfully realized $2.05 million in appropriations for the federal building. A site was selected on January 12, 1931. The location consisted of two small blocks between Brambleton Avenue on the north, East Bute Street on the south, Monticello Avenue on the east and Granby Street on the west, bisected by York Street. The site consisted of approximately 81,000 square feet, part of which had been occupied by St. Luke's Episcopal Church, destroyed by fire ten years earlier.

On April 9, 1931, the Virginian-Pilot announced that a team formed by local architect Benjamin F. Mitchell in association with the firm of Rudolph, Cooke and VanLeeuwen was selected to design the new building. B.F. Mitchell, an architect of many Norfolk projects, had worked for the city in the planning and building of the City Market. He designed Booker T. Washington High School and Southgate Terminal, one of the largest construction projects in the area. The firm of Mitchell, Rudolph, Cooke and VanLeeuwen was known for designing several apartment buildings, the addition to the Virginia Beach Casino, and several buildings in North Carolina. Among the architects assigned to the team was Mary Brown Channel, who joined the firm after her graduation from Cornell University in 1933; in 1935 she would become the first woman licensed to practice architecture in the commonwealth of Virginia.

Bids were opened in Washington on April 11, 1932 for the construction of the foundation of Norfolk's new Federal Building. The Virginia Engineering Company of Newport News won the contract with the lowest offer of $210,000. Part of the bid required that the foundation of the building was to be completed in 120 days.

The construction of the remainder of the building was opened for bid on October 21, 1932. Shortly after this time, the Treasury Department decided to reduce the building to four stories in height instead of five stories. The construction contract was awarded to Consolidated Engineering Company (Baltimore, MD) with the low bid of $1,034,000. Although the height of the building was scaled down, measures were taken during construction to allow for the addition of a fifth story at a future date. Although more than $2 million had been appropriated for the construction, the funding was later cut to $1,925,000. The building's total cost was $2.71 million, including $575,000 for the purchase of the site and $210,000 for construction of the foundation.

John Rapelye was selected to serve as the consulting engineer by the Treasury Department in January, 1933. By the following September, the cornerstone was laid "with solemn rites" (The Virginian-Pilot, September 8, 1933). Postmaster General James A. Farley and Virginia Senator Harry Byrd were among the special guests who spoke at the ceremony. The building was officially complete on October 14, 1934, when the keys to the building were turned over to the Post Office by Rapelye. However, the Post Office did not move into its quarters until the following week, October 21, 1934. The courthouses were moved in shortly afterwards. The Post Office remained in the building for 50 years, moving to a separate facility in 1984. At this time the remainder of the building was rehabilitated for additional courthouses for the U.S. District Court of Eastern Virginia. The building, renamed the Walter E. Hoffman U.S. Courthouse, was entered on the National Register of Historic Places in October, 1984.

Although this outstanding Art Deco building is one of only a few Art Deco federal buildings in the Tidewater area, the building reflects a national trend in Federal building design of the 1930s that became the Art Moderne style of the 1930s and 1940s. These new federal buildings were monumental in scale, a tribute to the democratic ideals of the 1930s, with reference to the strength of the government. A Virginian-Pilot article from September 22, 1934 noted that the building was "fashioned in conservative modernistic design and giving the impression of unlimited stability and bulk." Compared to the earlier Beaux Arts style, the designs were restrained in ornament, expressing a new attitude that was fresh, clean-lined and modern in the simplicity of the forms and materials. The building illustrates the strong rectilinear qualities associated with the Art Deco style, and later Art Moderne style, and incorporates classical features popular in earlier governmental buildings.

Also typical of the Art Deco style was the choice and use of the materials. Limestone is the primary exterior material, with a contrasting dark granite base and decorated aluminum spandrels between aluminum-framed windows. On the interior, the design and use of slick materials, such as granite, marble, aluminum, are presented in a simply composed geometric design with a high level of refinement. All of the cast aluminum designs are the work of a young local artist, Wyatt Hibbs. "All the appointments here are ultramodern, combining beauty with utility to a high degree" (Virginian-Pilot, September 8, 1934). It is the materials and their exquisite design and treatment that separates the building from the general body of Depression era work. Although the buildings designed and constructed under the WPA/PWA programs present similar stylistic devices and some of the same materials, the economic situation forced a more restrained approach, eventually resulting in a distinct style - the Art Moderne. Significant to the building's history is the short period of time required for its construction, just over two years. Today, having undergone a complete rehabilitation, with relatively few exceptions, both the exterior and interior are in excellent condition.

The Walter E. Hoffman Courthouse stands as a significant Federal building, contributing to the architectural and historic character of Norfolk. It specifically enhances its streetscape as part of a planned complex of civic structures.

== Architectural description ==
The Walter E. Hoffman U.S. District Courthouse is a trapezoidal-shaped building located on an irregular-shaped lot covering a two-city block area. The building is four stories in height, plus a basement. The primary (west) elevation fronts directly onto Granby Street and is 311 feet wide. The north elevation, facing Brambleton Avenue, is 218 feet wide. The south elevation, facing Bute Street, is the smallest side at 140 feet wide, and the east elevation, facing Monticello Avenue, is the longest at 321 feet wide.

The building illustrates many significant characteristics of the Art Deco style that were popular in the 1920s and 1930s. Its streamlined, elegant, and rectilinear designs and polished materials are mixed with simplified classical features that are typical of nationally designed government buildings.

The stepped-back, simplified ziggurat massing of the building establishes a long east–west horizontal axis with smaller, vertical axes at the main and secondary entrances. The second through fourth stories are stepped back from the partially below-ground basement and first story. The exterior walls terminate with a decorative parapet at both the first story and roof. The form and massing combined with two types of carved ornament also serve to distinguish the separate services of post office and courthouse.

All of the exterior elevations of the building are clad in light gray limestone wall panels set above a substantial base of polished black granite, approximately seven feet in height. Ordered fenestration, typically paired one-over-one aluminum-framed windows, organizes all facades. At the basement level, the original paired metal windows with metal louvers provide natural light and ventilation.

The building's main entrance is located on the west elevation, with three secondary entrances (now fire exits) on the west and east elevations. The full-height main entrance bay projects beyond the main facade and extends to the penthouse level on the roof. The secondary entrances are alike in design, and rise three stories in height. The architectural features at these entrances are similar to the main entrance, but are smaller in scale and simpler in decoration. All of the entrances feature simple aluminum-framed plate glass doors with brass hardware in a distinctive Art Deco design.

On the north elevation, the first and last bays project as one-story wings. The original loading dock platform and canopy for the postal area, located between the one-story wings, was removed in 1985. The area was infilled using replicated materials, features, and design motifs from adjoining facades: carved stone banding, aluminum double-hung windows, and polished black granite base. A new ramp with polished black granite walls has been installed to provide barrier-free access to the building. The upper part of the north elevation is flanked on either end by two full-height limestone-clad towers that handle furnace exhaust.

An interior court originally featured three skylights which provided natural light to the first floor postal workroom below. These have been removed and the openings infilled with a flat roof slab. These skylights were originally designed to provide natural light to the first floor postal workroom.

Since the postal function was removed in 1983, the building functions only as a courthouse, with several of the historic courtrooms largely intact on the third floor. Although additional courtrooms have been added, all have been executed with a high level of craftsmanship, featuring solid wood full-height paneling and carved wood details. Many secondary spaces throughout the building have been rehabilitated and renovated over the years, but were carefully fitted with replications of the original wood details: solid wood base, chairrail, window sills and stools, door casings, and paneled doors. In many cases the original materials were cleaned or refinished and reinstalled. In many of the secondary spaces and hallways, modern dropped ceilings and fluorescent lighting have been added, concealing the original plaster ceiling.

The first and third floors are historically the most elaborate with a lavish application of marbles, terrazzo, and ornamental cast aluminum finishes. The first floor L-shaped Main Lobby features full-height marble wall panels in a "crotch mahogany" or butterfly pattern. The marble floor is presented in a herringbone design with alternating tones of pink and rose marble, edged with a green marble border. Three of the six original oblong writing tables, made of marble and cast aluminum, remain in the north–south portion of the Main Lobby.

The original main courtroom on the third floor (USDC Courtroom #1), and adjoining Courtroom Lobby and Judge's Chambers, are equally lavish. Cream-colored mansota marble lines the walls of the Courtroom Lobby; the Main Courtroom, largely intact, features a mansota marble wainscot and classically detailed acoustic stone walls and pilasters.

The original, utilitarian postal workroom and offices on the first and second floors have been carefully rehabilitated for judicial offices and courtrooms. The basement houses the major machinery and provides storage space. The building has been adapted for barrier-free use and dead-end corridors were eliminated to comply with fire codes.

The organization of the site and its landscape treatment is typical of freestanding urban buildings. The building is approached from Granby Street, with reserved parking on the Bute Street and Brambleton Avenue sides. The building retains its original pink granite curbs and steps. The landscaping has been confined to a narrow strip between the building and the sidewalk on the east and west elevations. Minimal plantings remain on the south elevation, originally designed as an open grass panel surrounded by an oval grove walk and a ring of plantings.
