= Mary Brown Channel =

American architect

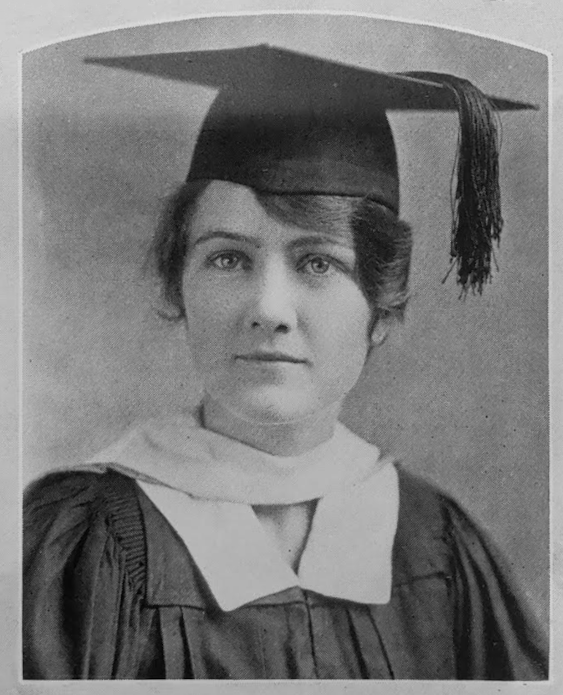
- Mary Brown Channel's 1929 yearbook photo at Randolph-Macon Woman's College
- Born: December 8, 1907; Portsmouth, Virginia, U.S.
- Died: January 21, 2006 (aged 98)
- Education: Randolph-Macon Woman's College; Cornell University College of Architecture, Art, and Planning
- Occupation: Architect
- Known for: First woman licensed to practice architecture in Virginia
- Spouse: Warren Henry Channel (m. 1941)
- Children: 1
- Parents: William A. Brown; Mary Ramsay Brown

Mary Ramsay Brown Channel (December 8, 1907 – January 21, 2006) was an American architect. She was the first woman licensed to practice architecture in Virginia, although other female architects such as Ethel Furman had previously been active in the state.

== Early life and education ==
The daughter of William Ambrose Brown and Mary Ramsay Brown, Channel was a native of Portsmouth, Virginia.

She received a bachelor's degree in mathematics at Randolph-Macon Woman's College in 1929, and expressed a desire to study architecture at the University of Virginia, as had her brother. As women were denied entry into the university's graduate programs, at the time, she applied instead to the School of Architecture at Cornell University, from which she graduated in 1933. Second in her class, she won the Baird Prize Competition Medal, the first woman to receive the honor.

== Career ==
Returning to Portsmouth, she took a position with the firm of Rudolph, Cooke, and Van Leeuwen in Norfolk; unsalaried for two years, she nevertheless gained a great deal of experience, working on a team that designed numerous civic buildings including the city's federal courthouse.

In 1935, in a class of five, she was one of three to pass the licensing exam offered by the Virginia Examining Board. Following which, she opened a practice of her own in Portsmouth.

In October 1941, she married businessman Warren Henry Channel. The birth of her first child led her to restrict her work to residential and ecclesiastical projects; even so she kept her license until 1990, and was developing architectural drawings until after she turned 80.

Buildings designed by Channel were erected throughout southeastern Virginia, including in Greenbrier, Blackstone, and Portsmouth; she also designed additions and extensions to Portsmouth's St. John's Church and Abigarlos, among other structures. A collection of papers related to her career, including drawings and sketches for around 160 projects, were donated to the Special Collections Library at Virginia Tech in 2007, where it forms part of the collection of the International Archive of Women in Architecture.
