= Frank Vest =

Bishop of the Episcopal Diocese of Southern Virginia

The Right Reverend Frank Harris Vest D.D., D.H.L.
- Bishop of Southern Virginia
- Church: Episcopal Church
- Diocese: Southern Virginia
- In office: 1991–1998
- Predecessor: Charles Vaché
- Successor: David Conner Bane Jr.
- Previous posts: Suffragan Bishop of North Carolina (1985-1989); Coadjutor Bishop of Southern Virginia (1989-1991)

Orders
- Ordination: June 1963 by William Henry Marmion
- Consecration: May 19, 1985 by John Allin

Personal details
- Born: January 5, 1936 Roanoke, Virginia, United States
- Died: April 5, 2008 (aged 72) Lynchburg, Virginia, United States
- Denomination: Anglican
- Parents: Frank Harris Vest and Viola Gray Woodson
- Spouse: Ann Jarvis
- Children: 3
- Education: Roanoke College

Frank Harris Vest, Jr. (January 5, 1936 – April 5, 2008) was the eighth bishop of the Episcopal Diocese of Southern Virginia, serving from 1991 to 1998.

== Early life and education ==
Vest was born in Roanoke, Virginia on January 5, 1936, the son of Frank Harris Vest and Viola Gray Woodson. He was educated at Blacksburg High School in Blacksburg, Virginia. He then studied at Roanoke College and graduated with a Bachelor of Arts in 1959. He also studied at the Virginia Theological Seminary from where he earned his Master of Divinity in 1962. The same seminary awarded him an honorary Doctor of Divinity in 1985 and the University of the South awarded him a Doctor of Humane Letters in 1987. He was awarded another honorary Doctor of Divinity by St Paul's College in 1991 and Roanoke College in 1998, respectively. He married Ann Jarvis on June 14, 1961, and together they had three children: a daughter and two sons.

== Ordained ministry ==
Vest was ordained deacon in June, 1962, and priest in June, 1963 by Bishop William Henry Marmion of Southwestern Virginia. In 1962 he became curate at St John's Church in Roanoke, Virginia, while in 1964 he became rector of Grace Church in Radford, Virginia and chaplain at Radford University. Between 1968 and 1973 he served as rector of Christ Church in Roanoke, Virginia. In 1973 he became rector of Christ Church in Charlotte, North Carolina, where he remained till 1985.

== Bishop ==
Vest was elected Suffragan Bishop of North Carolina in 1985 and was consecrated on May 19, 1985, in the Duke Chapel, Durham, North Carolina, with Presiding Bishop John Allin as chief consecrator. In 1989 he was then elected Coadjutor Bishop of Southern Virginia, with the right of succession. He succeeded as diocesan bishop in 1991 and retired in 1998. He died on April 5, 2008, in Lynchburg, Virginia.

Episcopal Church (USA) titles
Preceded by C. Charles Vache	8th Bishop of Southern Virginia; 1991–1998	Succeeded by David Conner Bane Jr.
Vacant Title last held by Moultrie Moore	3rd Bishop Suffragan of North Carolina; 1985–1989	Succeeded by Huntington Williams, Jr.
