= David Conner Bane Jr. =

American bishop

The Right Reverend David Conner Bane
- Bishop of Southern Virginia
- Church: Episcopal Church
- Diocese: Southern Virginia
- In office: 1998–2006
- Predecessor: Frank Vest
- Successor: Herman Hollerith IV
- Previous post: Coadjutor Bishop of Southern Virginia (1997-1998)

Orders
- Ordination: 1985
- Consecration: April 9, 1997 by Herbert Thompson Jr.

Personal details
- Born: 1942 (age 83–84) Morgantown, West Virginia, United States
- Denomination: Anglican
- Spouse: Elizabeth
- Children: 4

David Conner Bane Jr. (born 1940) is an American prelate who served as the ninth Bishop of Southern Virginia, serving from 1998 to 2006.

== Early life and education ==
Bane was born in Morgantown, West Virginia in 1940. He studied at Bethany College, graduating with a bachelor's degree in economics and then at West Virginia University, from which he received a master's degree in business administration. After four years serving with the U.S. Air Force and dozen year career as a businessman, and separation from his wife in 1975 due to his alcoholism, he began attending church in Morgantown, West Virginia with her, and heard a call to the ministry and turned his life (and career) around. Bane studied at the Virginia Theological Seminary in Alexandria, Virginia and graduated in 1985. The same year he was ordained a deacon and priest.

== Ministry ==
After ordination he became rector at St. John's Church in Wheeling, West Virginia (1985-1987), then accepted a call from St James' Church in Keene, New Hampshire (1987-1991). In 1991 he transferred to Dayton, Ohio and served as rector at Christ Church until accepting the offer from the Diocese of Southern Virginia. Bane was elected Coadjutor Bishop of Southern Virginia on April 9, 1997, during a diocesan special session on the seventh ballot. On September 6, 1997, by Bishop Herbert Thompson Jr. of Southern Ohio led the consecration service at the Hampton Convocation Center. He succeeded Rt. Rev. Frank Vest diocesan bishop on June 27, 1998.

== Resignation and renunciation ==
Due to the number of years of division in the diocese, which culminated with a report from three bishops which advised deep systemic change within the diocese, during a Special Council of the Diocese, Bane announced his intention of resigning as Bishop of Southern Virginia on October 12, 2005. He formally resigned on February 11, 2006, during the 2006 Annual Council.

On June 12, 2009, Presiding Bishop Katharine Jefferts Schori announced her acceptance of Bane's intention to renounce his ministry as a bishop of the Episcopal Church and resign from the church. Bane was at the time ministering in the Anglican Diocese of Pittsburgh which had separated from the Episcopal Diocese of Pittsburgh. After executing his renunciation on May 22, 2009, Rt.Rev. Bane joined the Anglican Church in North America, a breakaway denomination that separated from the Episcopal Church and the Anglican Church of Canada. However, on March 21, 2015, Bane left the ACNA and wrote a letter rescinding his renunciation of the Episcopal Church. He was formally restored as a member of the Episcopal Church and of the House of Bishops on April 8, 2015.

Episcopal Church (USA) titles
Preceded by Frank Vest	9th Bishop of Southern Virginia; 1998–2006	Succeeded by Herman Hollerith IV
