= John H. Burt =

American Episcopal priest (1918–2009)

The Right Reverend John Harris Burt D.D.
- Bishop of Ohio
- Church: Episcopal Church
- Diocese: Ohio
- Elected: May 20, 1966
- In office: 1967–1983
- Predecessor: Nelson M. Burroughs
- Successor: James R. Moodey
- Previous post: Coadjutor Bishop of Ohio (1967)

Orders
- Ordination: January 1944 by William Scarlett
- Consecration: February 4, 1967 by John E. Hines

Personal details
- Born: April 11, 1918 Marquette, Michigan, United States
- Died: October 20, 2009 (aged 91) Marquette, Michigan, United States
- Buried: Park Cemetery, Marquette, Michigan
- Denomination: Anglican
- Parents: Bates Gilbert Burt & Emily May Bailey
- Spouse: Martha May Miller (m. 1946)
- Children: 4
- Education: Columbia University; Virginia Theological Seminary
- Alma mater: Amherst College

John Harris Burt (April 11, 1918 – October 20, 2009) was an American prelate, civil rights activist, and social worker, who served as the eighth bishop of the Episcopal Diocese of Ohio from 1967 to 1983.

== Early life and education ==
Burt was born in Marquette, Michigan on April 11, 1918, to the Reverend Bates Gilbert Burt (1878-1946) and Emily May Bailey (1883-1945). He was educated tat the high school of Pontiac, Michigan, before studying at Amherst College, from where he graduated with a Bachelor of Arts in 1940. He also served as the managing editor of the college newspaper, president of his fraternity and vice president of his senior class. He then did some a post-graduate studies in Social Work at Columbia University, after which he worked as a social worker at Christodora House in New York City. He then enrolled at the Virginia Theological Seminary, and graduated with a Bachelor of Divinity in 1943. He was awarded honorary Doctor of Divinity degrees from Amherst College in 1940, Youngstown University in 1958, the Virginia Theological Seminary in 1967, and Kenyon College in 1967. He married Martha May Miller (1921-2011) on February 16, 1946.

== Ordained ministry ==
Burt was ordained deacon in July 1943 by Bishop Frank W. Creighton of Michigan, and priest in January 1944, by Bishop William Scarlett of Missouri. He served as canon of the Cathedral chapter of Christ Church Cathedral in St. Louis, and as rector of St Paul's Church in St. Louis between 1943 and 1944. He then served as chaplain with the U.S. Navy between 1944 and 1946.

In 1946, he became chaplain at the University of Michigan, while in 1950, he became rector of St John's Church in Youngstown, Ohio. Between 1957 and 1967, he served as rector of All Saints' Church in Pasadena, California, where he transformed the parish into a leading voice for social change.

== Bishop ==
On May 20, 1966, Burt was elected Coadjutor Bishop of Ohio, and was consecrated on February 4, 1967, in Trinity Cathedral, Cleveland, Ohio with Presiding Bishop John E. Hines as chief consecrator. He succeeded as diocesan that same year, and retired in 1983.

== Civil Rights ==
Burt was a friend of the Reverend Martin Luther King Jr.; he was instrumental in organizing civil rights rallies in Los Angeles, notably the 1963 civil rights event in Wrigley Field that attracted 30,000 people, and the 1964 event that was attended by 15,000 in the Los Angeles Memorial Coliseum. He also actively supported Cesar Chavez and the Farmworkers Movement.

Burt was also a vocal opponent of the Vietnam War. He was chosen by the Presiding Bishop to serve as a delegate on an interfaith global tour that included visiting South Vietnam and attending the International Inter-Religious Symposium of Peace in New Delhi. After the 1978 fall of the steel industry in Youngstown, Ohio, he co-founded the Ecumenical Coalition of the Mahoning Valley, for which he was awarded the Thomas Merton Award. He was also a supporter of the ordination of women to the priesthood and was the first Bishop of Ohio to ordain women in the diocese.
