= Susan B. Haynes =

The Right Reverend Susan B. Haynes
- Bishop of Southern Virginia
- Church: Episcopal Church
- Diocese: Southern Virginia
- Elected: September 21, 2019
- In office: 2020–present
- Predecessor: Herman Hollerith IV
- Previous posts: rector, St. Paul Episcopal Church, Mishawaka, Indiana

Orders
- Ordination: December 21, 2004 (deacon); June 24, 2005 (priest) by Edward S. Little II
- Consecration: February 1, 2020 by Michael Curry

Personal details
- Born: 1959 (age 66–67) Tampa, Florida, United States
- Denomination: Anglican
- Spouse: Rev. Thomas Erskine Haynes
- Children: 2 children
- Education: University of the South; Middle Tennessee State University
- Alma mater: Vanderbilt University Divinity School

Susan Bunton Haynes (born 1959) is the 11th bishop of the Episcopal Diocese of Southern Virginia, the first female bishop of the diocese.

== Early and family life ==
Born in Tampa, Florida and raised in South Carolina, she received a bachelor's degree from the University of the South in 1981 and a master's degree from Middle Tennessee State University in 1989 and M.Div. from Vanderbilt University Divinity School in 1993. She married fellow Floridian Thomas E. Haynes in 1982 and he taught at the Culver Academies before being ordained a priest in 2010 and serving as priest in charge of St. Thomas Episcopal Church in Plymouth and pastor of St. Elizabeth's Episcopal Church in Culver, both in Marshall County, Indiana. They have two children.

== Ministry ==
Ordained as a deacon by Bishop Edward S. Little II of the Diocese of Northern Indiana on December 21, 2004, Haynes was ordained to the priesthood on June 24, 2005, and became an associate priest at St. James Cathedral in South Bend, St. Joseph County, Indiana, rising to become the priest in charge before accepting a position as rector of St. Paul's Episcopal Church in Mishawaka (also in St. Joseph County), where she served for 11 years.

On September 21, 2019, Rev. Haynes was elected to become the 11th bishop of the Diocese of Southern Virginia, the seat having been vacant following the retirement of the Rt. Rev. Herman Hollerith IV in January 2019. Her ordination being scheduled to occur in Saint Bede Catholic Church resulted in controversy, as the Catholic Church does not recognize the Episcopal Church's ordinations nor the ordination of women. An invitation from the Catholic parish had been approved by Roman Catholic Diocese of Richmond Bishop Barry Knestout as an ecumenical gesture. On 17 January 2020, the Episcopal Diocese of Southern Virginia announced they were moving the ordination to Williamsburg Community Chapel, citing that the event was "causing dismay and distress" in the Saint Bede community and invoking the warning of St. Paul against "pursuing behavior that might cause problems for others within their community." Presiding Bishop Michael Curry presided at her consecration to the episcopate on February 1, 2020, in Williamsburg, Virginia and Bishop Edward S. Little II preached.
