= Nathaniel Beverley Tucker (journalist) =

American journalist

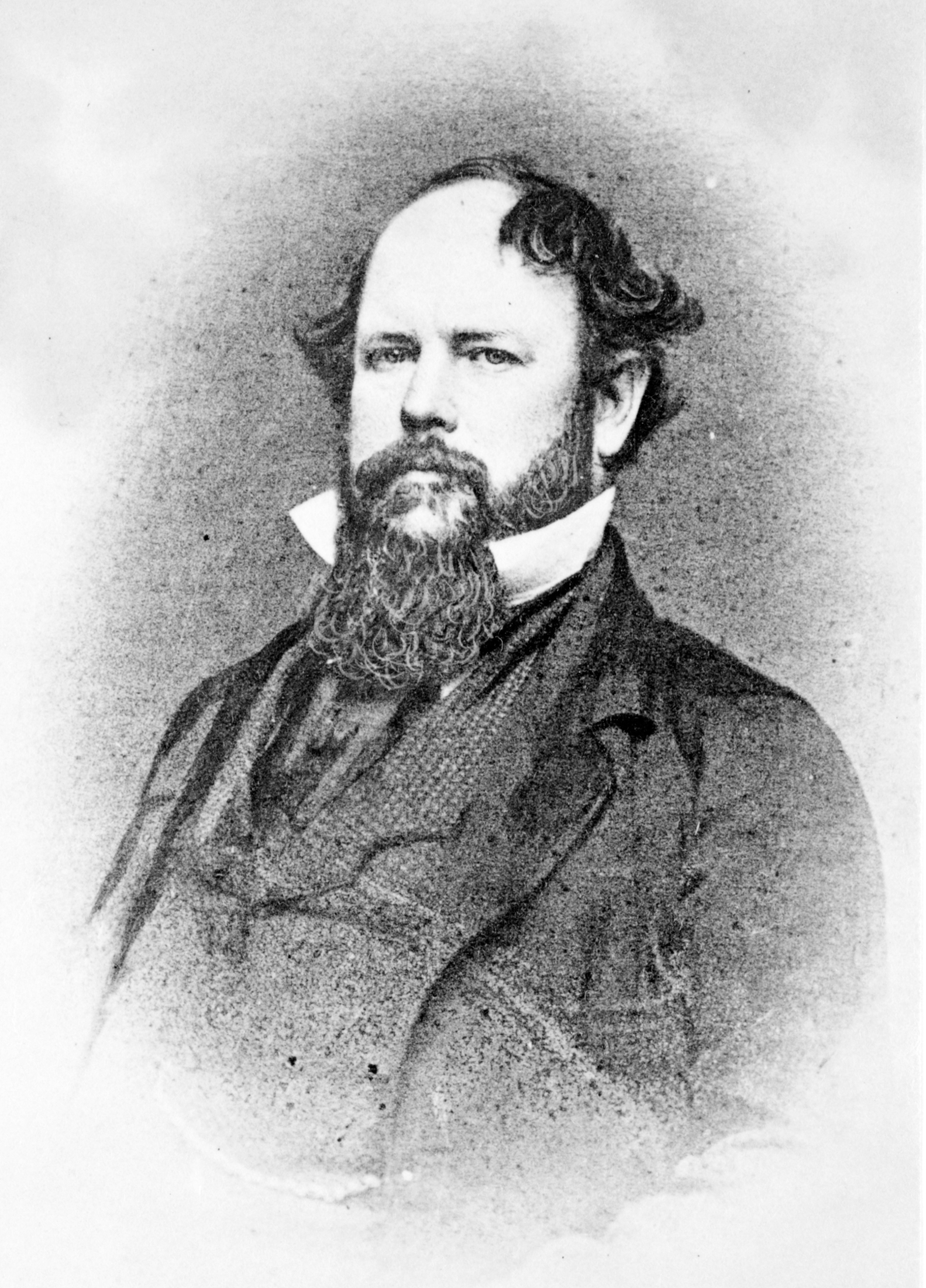
"Beverly Tucker", 1860 to 1880 photograph of an earlier portrait

Nathaniel Beverley Tucker (June 8, 1820 – July 4, 1890) was an American journalist, printer, and diplomat. During the American Civil War he was a Confederate States (Southern) economic agent in France, England, and Canada, and also a secret representative in the North.

== Biography ==
Tucker was born in Winchester, Virginia, the son of Congressman Henry St. George Tucker, Sr. and Ann Evelina Hunter. Thus he was the brother of John Randolph Tucker, Congressman, and the uncle of Henry St. George Tucker, III, Congressman. He was named for the writer and judge Nathaniel Beverley Tucker, his own uncle.

Tucker was educated at the University of Virginia. He founded the Washington Sentinel and was its editor from 1853 to 1856. In December 1853 he was elected printer to the United States Senate, and in 1857 he was appointed consul to Liverpool, England, where he remained until 1861. Then he joined the Confederate Army.

The Confederate government sent him to the United Kingdom and France in 1862, and to Canada in 1863–64, to arrange the trade of cotton for food. He also made some secret diplomatic representations to Northern men of influence. During the War he was on the Union "Wanted List", and in its aftermath he was charged as a conspirator in the successful 1865 plot to assassinate Abraham Lincoln. Although he was never arrested, he was never pardoned either.

After the War he went to Mexico, and remained there until the reign of Maximilian I of Mexico (not recognized by the U.S.) came to an end in June 1867, when he returned to Canada. Upon returning to the United States in 1869, he resided in Washington, D.C., and Berkeley Springs, West Virginia. In 1890 he died in Richmond, Virginia.

In 1840 or 1841, Tucker married Jane Shelton Ellis (born about 1820 in Richmond, Virginia), the daughter of Charles Ellis and Jane Shelton. Among his eight children was Beverley Dandridge Tucker, Episcopal Bishop of Southern Virginia. (Thus he was the grandfather of Henry St. George Tucker, the Presiding Bishop of the Episcopal Church, USA from 1938 to 1946.)
