= Cynthia Beverley Washington Coleman =

American preservationist and writer (1832–1908)

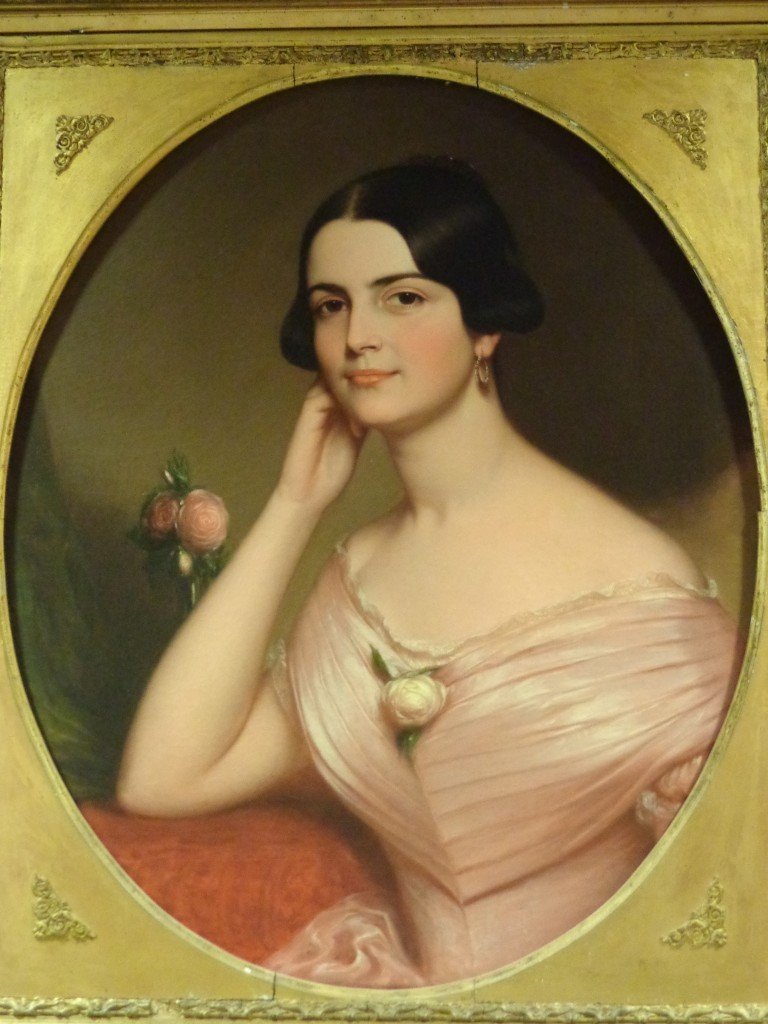
- Born: Cynthia Smith Tucker; January 18, 1832; Saline County, Missouri
- Died: October 24, 1908 (aged 76); Williamsburg, Virginia
- Other name: Cynthia Beverley Tucker Washington Coleman
- Occupations: Preservationist, writer

Cynthia Beverley Washington Coleman (née Tucker; 1832–1908) was an American preservationist and writer. She was one of the first preservationists to advocate for the restoration of historic buildings in Williamsburg, Virginia. Her work predated the establishment of the Colonial Williamsburg Foundation, with Coleman credited as a forebear of that organization's restoration and preservation work in the city.

== Biography ==
She was born in Saline County, Missouri and christened Cynthia Smith Tucker, but her middle name was later changed to Beverley. Her father was writer and judge Nathaniel Beverley Tucker, a prominent advocate for States Rights, southern unity, and the continuation of slavery. In 1834, the Tucker family moved to Williamsburg, Virginia, where Nathaniel Tucker had accepted a professorship at the nearby College of William and Mary. As such, Cynthia grew up in the Williamsburg area, and was educated both at home and at a Loudoun County boarding school.

In 1852, Cynthia married Henry Augustine Washington, a legal scholar and professor of history at William and Mary. The couple often travelled between Williamsburg and Washington D.C., where Henry often sat in on congressional debates. However, their family life did not last long: their two daughters both died in infancy, and in 1858 Henry was killed in an accident with an air rifle. In 1861, she married Charles Washington Coleman, a Williamsburg native and surgeon. The couple's marriage took place early in the American Civil War, and soon Charles joined the Confederate army to work as a surgeon while she remained in Williamsburg. During the 1862 Peninsula campaign, Williamsburg was occupied by the Union army, and, by 1863, Cynthia had moved to North Carolina, only returning after the war ended.

After the Civil War ended, the reunited Coleman family grew extensively, with Cynthia having six children between 1862 and 1874 - two would die in infancy, and one of her daughters would die young. Looking for a way to honor her daughter's death, in 1883 she founded an association dedicated to raising funds for Bruton Parish Church in Williamsburg. To raise money, the association gathered ivy and early flowers for sale, sold baked goods, and collected donations. Cynthia's efforts proved to be a major success, and the association being able to refurbish the parish church's graveyard.

Inspired by this success (and after an altercation with the rector of Burton church over funds), she redirected her efforts to preserving other historic buildings in Williamsburg, many of which were in a state of dilapidation. Working with other preservationists, she hoped to establish a women's historical association to better manage historical properties - when Preservation Virginia was established in 1889, the organization's first meeting was held at Cynthia's house in Williamsburg and she was named the director of Preservation's Colonial Capital branch. The first structure Cynthia worked to restore was the Powder Magazine in Williamsburg, which had long since been abandoned; organizing public support and funds, she and other members of the association purchased and restored the structure, which is now administrated as part of Colonial Williamsburg. Cynthia would go on to raise awareness of other endangered buildings in Williamsburg and would travel the state seeking funds for restoration projects. She also served as vice president of Preservation Virginia from 1889 to 1905. She was also a member of the Virginia chapter of the Colonial Dames of America and would write a number of historical vignettes on the history of Virginia (though she asked to remain uncredited).

Cynthia Coleman died on 24 October 1908 and is buried at Bruton Parish Church. She is considered by some sources to be a forebear of the movement to establish Colonial Williamsburg, and her portrait is preserved in the Swem Library at William and Mary.
