= Anne B. Jolly =

American prelate of the Episcopal Church (born 1954)

The Right Reverend Anne B. Jolly
- Bishop of Ohio
- Church: Episcopal Church
- Province: Province V
- Diocese: Ohio
- Elected: November 19, 2022
- In office: 2023–
- Predecessor: Mark Hollingsworth, Jr.

Orders
- Ordination: 2014 by Dena Harrison
- Consecration: April 29, 2023 by Michael Curry

Personal details
- Born: Anne B. Jolly
- Denomination: Episcopal
- Residence: Cleveland, OH
- Spouse: David Jolly
- Children: 3
- Education: Furman University (BA); School of Theology at Sewanee (MDiv)

Anne B. Jolly is the Episcopal bishop of Ohio, the first woman to hold that ecclesiastical post.

Jolly had been a salesperson and recruiter in the private business world.

She "was elected as Bishop Coadjutor of the Episcopal Diocese of Ohio during the 206th annual convention on November 19, 2022 ... on the second ballot...." The election took place in Cleveland, Ohio. The election was held at a secular venue, the Cleveland Marriott Downtown at Key Tower. She "is the first woman to be chosen as a bishop in the Episcopal Diocese of Ohio," and was to succeed the incumbent bishop, who as of the election had not yet announced the exact date when he would retire. She had previously served as the incumbent priest several congregations in parishes in Austin, Texas, Chattanooga, Tennessee, Greenville, South Carolina, and most recently, at St. Gregory's in Deerfield, Illinois. She succeeded the Rt. Rev. Mark Hollingsworth, Jr.
