= Beverley D. Tucker =

19th and 20th-century American Episcopal bishop

The Right Reverend Beverley Dandridge Tucker
- Bishop of Southern Virginia
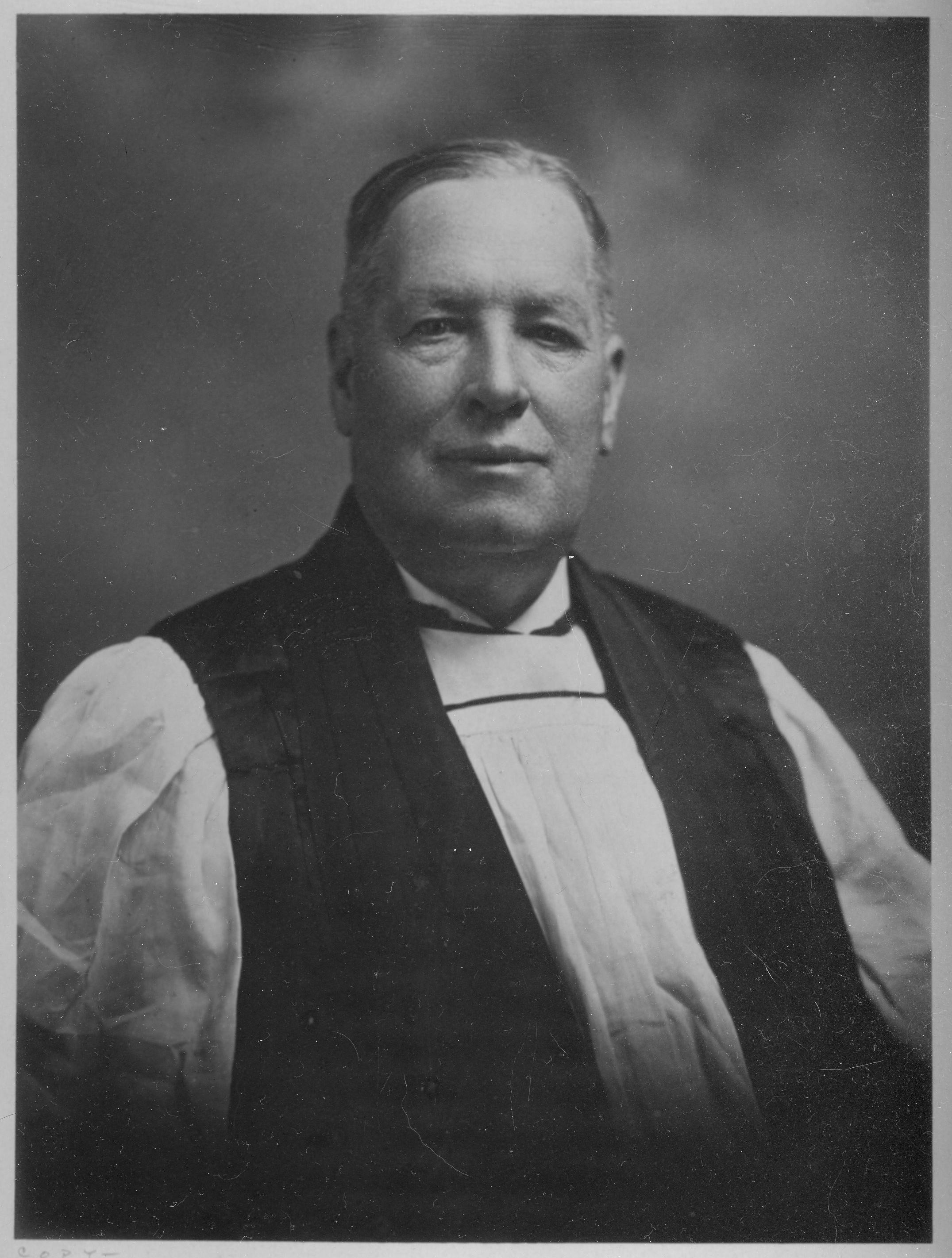
- Church: Episcopal Church
- Diocese: Southern Virginia
- In office: 1918–1930
- Predecessor: Alfred Magill Randolph
- Successor: Arthur C. Thomson
- Previous post: Coadjutor Bishop of Southern Virginia (1906–1918)

Orders
- Ordination: June 25, 1875 by John Johns
- Consecration: October 3, 1906 by Alfred Magill Randolph

Personal details
- Born: November 9, 1846 Richmond, Virginia, United States
- Died: January 17, 1930 (aged 83)
- Buried: Zion Episcopal Churchyard, Charles Town, West Virginia
- Denomination: Anglican
- Parents: Nathaniel Beverley Tucker, Jane Shelton Ellis
- Spouse: Anna Maria Washington
- Children: 13
- Education: University of Toronto; University of Virginia
- Alma mater: Virginia Theological Seminary

Beverley Dandridge Tucker (November 9, 1846 – January 17, 1930) was the second bishop of the Episcopal Diocese of Southern Virginia. Four of his sons also distinguished themselves within the Episcopal Church.

== Early and family life ==
Born in Richmond, Virginia, on November 9, 1846, Beverley Dandridge Tucker was one of eight children of Nathaniel Beverley Tucker (then a journalist and printer) and his second wife, Jane Shelton Ellis (1820-1901). The Tuckers (and Dandridges) were among the First Families of Virginia, owned plantations and enslaved people, and were proud of their descent from English ancestors. George Tucker of County Kent, England, emigrated to Bermuda about the year 1619, and his descendant, the lawyer and judge St. George Tucker (Tucker's great-grandfather), moved from Bermuda to Virginia in about 1770.

Tucker's father served as U.S. Consul in Liverpool, England, an important trading point for Virginia cotton, from 1857 until joining the Confederate cause in 1861 upon Virginia's secession from the Union. He then represented the Confederacy in the same locale. Young Beverley thus received his early education in English and Swiss schools, and also studied at the University of Toronto. During the American Civil War, Tucker returned to Virginia and enlisted in the Confederate States Army, becoming a private in the Otey battery and witnessing the final eighteen months of the Confederacy.

After the Confederacy was defeated, Tucker taught school for five years in Winchester, Virginia. He also took classes at the University of Toronto and taught school before entering the Virginia Theological Seminary in Alexandria, Virginia, in 1871, where he found his life's work and graduated in 1873. He received honorary degrees from Roanoke College in 1897 and from the College of William and Mary.

Tucker married Anna Maria Washington (1851-1927). They had 13 children, including the Episcopal priest and hymn composer Francis Bland Tucker; Beverley Dandridge Tucker the 6th Bishop of the Episcopal Diocese of Ohio and a Rhodes scholar; and Henry St. George Tucker, the 19th Presiding Bishop of the Episcopal Church, and medical missionary Augustine Washington Tucker.

== Career ==
Tucker became a priest of the Episcopal Church and Bishop John Johns in 1873 assigned him to the historic Lunenburg parish in Richmond County, Virginia, where he served as rector until 1882. Tucker became a staunch Democrat and chaplain of the Pickett-Buchanan camp of Confederate Veterans. He then accepted a position as rector of the historic St. Paul's Church in Norfolk, Virginia, where he served until his consecration as co-adjutor bishop of the new Diocese of Southern Virginia, as discussed below. In 1905, Tucker delivered a sermon on "Continuity of the Life of the Church" at a service inaugurating the restoration of the interior of Bruton Parish Church in nearby Williamsburg to its colonial form and appearance. Tucker served on the board of visitors of the College of William & Mary in Williamsburg, as well as at the General Convention of the Episcopal Church beginning in 1892, as well as on the board of trustees of his alma mater, Virginia Theological Seminary.

In 1892, the Diocese of Virginia split, as had been contemplated for more than a decade, and Norfolk and Williamsburg were made part of the new Diocese of Southern Virginia, with Alfred Magill Randolph as its first bishop, but with a planned additional split of the western part of that diocese. To ensure continuity in the event of his demise, in 1905, Randolph asked for a co-adjutor bishop and Virginia-born missionary Arthur Selden Lloyd was elected, but declined the post. The following year, Tucker was selected and consecrated by Randolph and several other bishops, including fellow former Confederate George William Peterkin, bishop of the Diocese of West Virginia. Despite his association with the diocese's Tidewater region, with historic churches and congregations, Tucker was concerned about educational deficits, particularly in Virginia's mountain regions. He established several archdeaneries, in which a priest supervised missionaries and teachers in new churches and schools in underserved areas. When Randolph died in 1918, Tucker succeed as the diocesan bishop. He then made Arthur C. Thomson, who had been consecrated as suffragan bishop the previous year (as Randolph's health deteriorated), as his co-adjutor. Rt.Rev. Tucker excelled at social interactions with wealthy potential donors, including Coca-Cola heiress and philanthropist Letitia Pate Whitehead Evans and John D. Rockefeller Jr., who helped establish Colonial Williamsburg.

Tucker also published several books, including Confederate Verses, Sketch of St. Paul's Church, Scattered Essays and Poems, and My Three Loves (1910).

== Death and legacy ==
Tucker died in 1930 and was buried with his wife among her relatives in the Zion Episcopal Churchyard in Charles Town, West Virginia. A plaque in Bruton Parish recognizes Tucker's lifelong work among African-Americans.
