= Nelson Burroughs =

American prelate

The Right Reverend Nelson Marigold Burroughs D.D., S.T.D.
- Bishop of Ohio
- Church: Episcopal Church
- Diocese: Ohio
- Appointed: May 19, 1949
- In office: 1952–1967
- Predecessor: Beverley Dandridge Tucker
- Successor: John H. Burt
- Previous post: Coadjutor Bishop of Ohio (1949-1952)

Orders
- Ordination: December 1925 by Charles Fiske
- Consecration: November 16, 1949 by Henry St. George Tucker

Personal details
- Born: July 12, 1899 Bridgeport, Connecticut, United States
- Died: December 19, 1998 (aged 99) Boston, Massachusetts, United States
- Buried: Seaside Cemetery, Chatham, Massachusetts
- Denomination: Anglican
- Spouse: Ann Bywater Cluett (m. 1938)
- Children: 4
- Education: Wesleyan University; Berkeley Divinity School

Nelson Marigold Burroughs (July 12, 1899 - December 19, 1998) was an American prelate of the Episcopal Church, who served as Bishop of Ohio from 1952 to 1967.

== Early life and education ==
Burroughs was born in Bridgeport, Connecticut on July 12, 1899, the son of Robert Nelson Burroughs (1868-1947) and Lillian May Dunworth (1867-1949). He studied at the Wesleyan University, where he earned his undergraduate Bachelor of Arts in 1922. He also studied at Berkeley Divinity School and graduated with a Bachelor of Sacred Theology in 1925. He was awarded an honorary Doctor of Divinity from Wesleyan University in 1942 and a Doctor of Sacred Theology from Berkeley Divinity School in 1950. He married Ann "Nancy" Bywater Cluett (1912-2010) on December 28, 1938, and together they had four children.

== Ordained ministry ==
Burroughs was made deacon in May 1925 by Bishop Chauncey B. Brewster of Connecticut, and ordained priest in December 1925 by Bishop Charles Fiske of Central New York. He served as assistant at St Paul's Church in Syracuse, New York between 1925 and 1927, before becoming rector of St Mark's Church in Syracuse, New York in 1927. In 1930, he became rector of St John's Church in Troy, New York, and in 1939, rector of Christ Church in Cincinnati, Ohio, where he remained until 1949.

== Bishop ==
On May 19, 1949, during a special diocesan convention, Burroughs was elected Coadjutor Bishop of Ohio. He was consecrated on November 16, 1949, with Presiding Bishop Henry St. George Tucker as chief consecrator. He succeeded as diocesan bishop in 1952 and remained until his retirement in 1967.

During that time he founded 19 congregations and oversaw the construction of 36 church buildings. Burroughs died on December 19, 1998, in a hotel room while in Boston to attend the annual Christmas Carol Service at Trinity Church.
