= Mark Hollingsworth =

American prelate of the Episcopal Church (born 1954)

The Right Reverend Mark Hollingsworth D.D.
- Bishop of Ohio
- Church: Episcopal Church
- Diocese: Ohio
- Elected: November 15, 2003
- In office: 2004–2023
- Predecessor: J. Clark Grew II
- Successor: Anne B. Jolly

Orders
- Ordination: 1982 by William E. Swing
- Consecration: April 17, 2004 by Wendell Gibbs

Personal details
- Born: Mark Hollingsworth Jr. April 11, 1954 (age 72) Dover, Massachusetts, United States
- Denomination: Anglican
- Parents: Caroline Jeanes (mother); Mark Hollingsworth Sr. (father)
- Spouse: Susan Melville Hunt (m. 1988)
- Children: 4
- Education: Church Divinity School of the Pacific; Trinity College

Mark Hollingsworth Jr. (born April 9, 1954) is an American prelate of the Episcopal Church, who served as the 11th Bishop of Ohio from 2003 to 2023.

== Early life ==
Hollingsworth was the son of Caroline Jeanes and Mark Hollingsworth Sr., chairman of paper manufacturer Hollingsworth & Vose in East Walpole, Massachusetts. He was raised in Dover, Massachusetts, along with four sisters. He attended St. Paul's School in Concord, New Hampshire.

He received a Bachelor of Arts degree in 1976 from Trinity College in Hartford, Connecticut, majoring in religious studies. There, he was a member of St. Anthony Hall. He received a Master of Divinity degree at the Church Divinity School of the Pacific in 1981. Later, he received an honorary Doctor of Divinity from the Church Divinity School of the Pacific.

William E. Swing, bishop of California, ordained him deacon and priest in 1981 and 1982, respectively.

== Career ==
From 1981 to 1983, Hollingsworth was the chaplain of the Cathedral School for Boys in San Francisco, California. He served as the associate rector of St. Francis in-the-Fields Church in Harrods Creek, Kentucky from 1983 to 1986. Next, he was rector of St. Anne's in-the-Fields in Lincoln, Massachusetts from 1986 to 1994. From 1994 to 2004, he was the Archdeacon of the Diocese of Massachusetts.

On November 15, 2003, Hollingsworth was elected the 11th bishop of the Episcopal Diocese of Ohio. He was consecrated on April 17, 2004, in Cleveland, Ohio.

Hollingsworth founded Epiphany at Sea, a program taking inner-city middle school students to sea on fishing schooners. He was a conference leader for CREDO, and served on its advisory board. His is also a trustee for the Bexley-Seabury Seminary, Episcopal Preaching Foundation, the Ocean Classroom Foundation, the Church Divinity School of the Pacific, and Kenyon College.

== Personal life ==
Hollingsworth married Susan Melville Hunt on July 30, 1988. She was a candidate for a Ph.D. from Harvard University. She is the daughter of Priscilla and Richard M. Hunt of Cambridge, Massachusetts. Her father was a marshal and senior lecturer of Harvard University. They are the parents of Sophie, Isaac, Eli, and Lily.

== See also ==
- List of Episcopal bishops of the United States
- Historical list of the Episcopal bishops of the United States

Episcopal Church (USA) titles
Preceded by J. Clark Grew II	Bishop of Ohio; 2004–present	Incumbent
