= Trinity Episcopal Church (Portsmouth, Virginia) =

Historic church in Virginia, United States

- U.S. National Register of Historic Places
- U.S. Historic district – Contributing property
- Virginia Landmarks Register
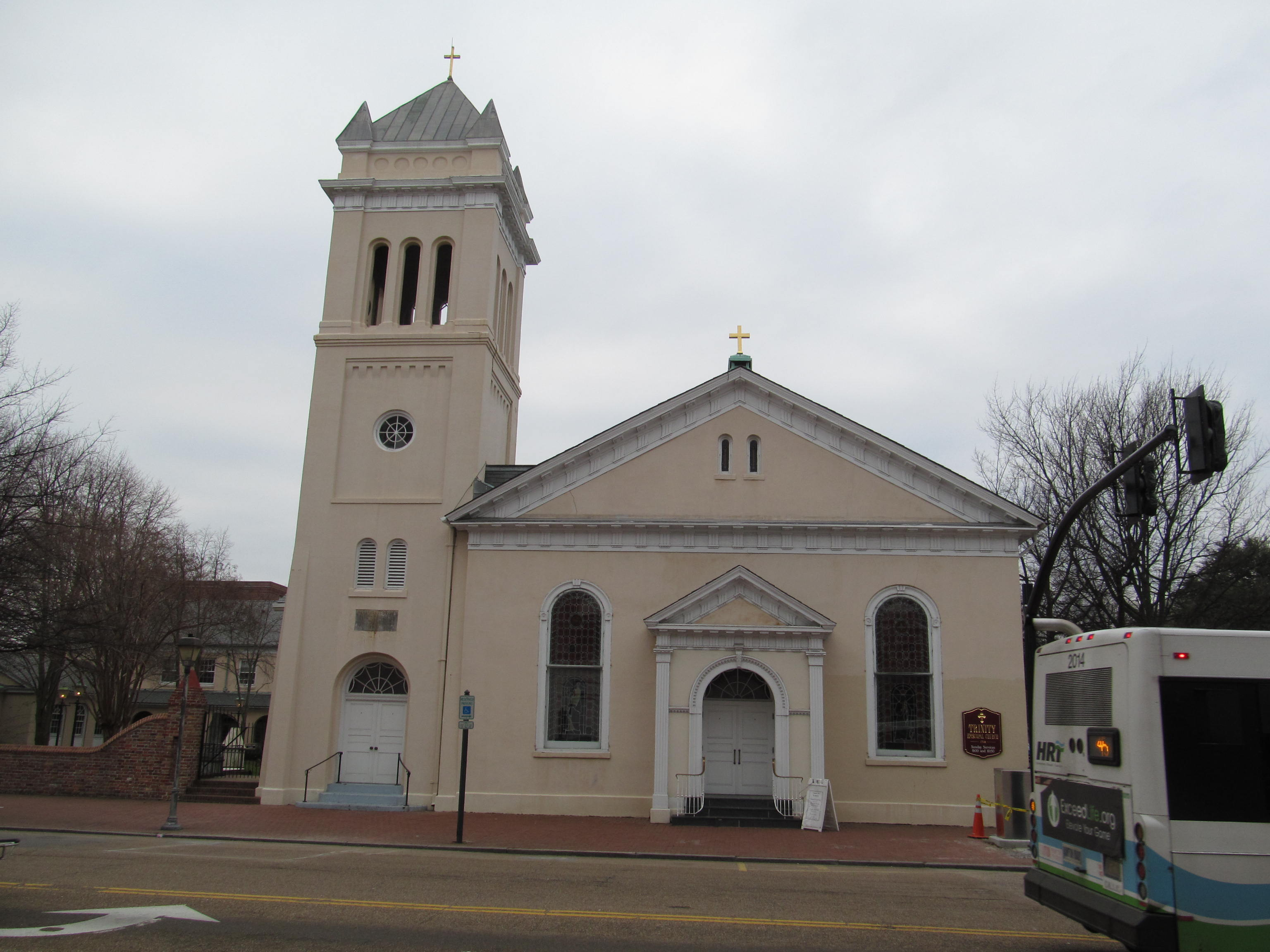
- Trinity Episcopal Church

- Location within Virginia Location within the United States
- Location: High and Court Sts., Portsmouth, Virginia
- Coordinates: 36°50′5″N 76°18′5″W
- Area: 9 acres (3.6 ha)
- Built: 1828-1830, 1887
- Architect: Cassell & Cassell
- NRHP reference No.: 73002219
- VLR No.: 124-0028

Significant dates
- Added to NRHP: May 14, 1973
- Designated VLR: April 17, 1973

Trinity Episcopal Church is a historic Episcopal church located in Portsmouth, Virginia. It was built between 1828 and 1830, and is a stuccoed brick building. It has an attached bell tower. Also on the property is the contributing parish house, built in 1887. During the American Civil War, the church was used as a hospital.

Rt.Rev. C. Charles Vaché, who served as its rector for 19 years before becoming the Bishop of Southern Virginia, wrote a history of the parish.

It was listed on the National Register of Historic Places in 1973. It is located in the Downtown Portsmouth Historic District.
