= Randolph Hollerith =

American Episcopal priest (born 1963)

The Very Reverend Randolph Hollerith
- Dean of Washington National Cathedral
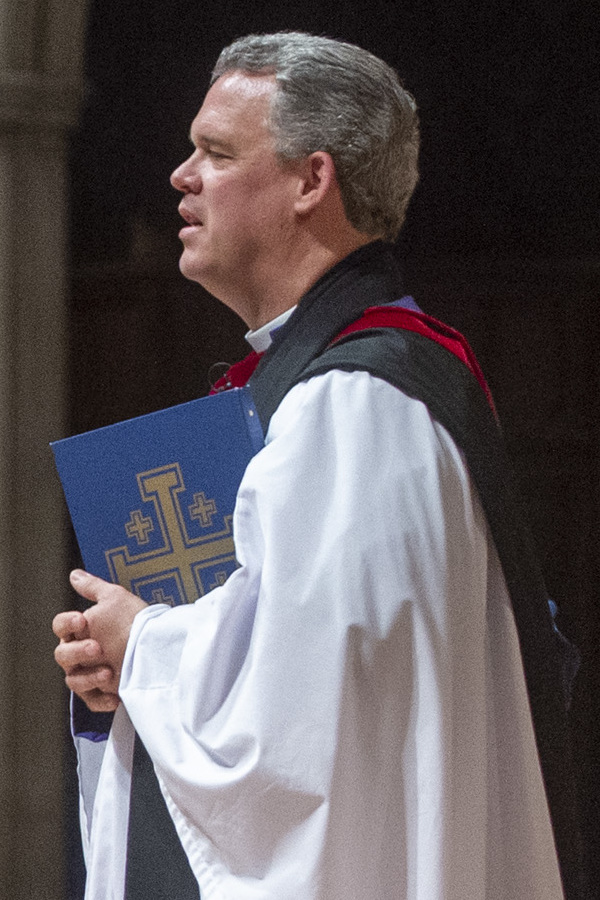
- Hollerith in 2018
- Church: Episcopal Church
- Diocese: Washington
- In office: August 2016-present
- Predecessor: Gary R. Hall

Orders
- Ordination: April 16, 1991 by Peter J. Lee

Personal details
- Born: October 10, 1963 (age 62) Washington, D.C., United States
- Denomination: Anglicanism
- Spouse: Melissa Hollerith
- Children: 2

Randolph Marshall Hollerith (born October 10, 1963) is an American Episcopal priest. Since August 2016, he has been the dean of Washington National Cathedral, the cathedral of the Episcopal Diocese of Washington and the seat of the presiding bishop of the Episcopal Church.

== Life and career ==
Hollerith had served as rector of St. James Episcopal Church, Richmond, Virginia, from 2000 to 2016. His brother is Herman Hollerith IV, a retired Bishop of Southern Virginia.

Hollerith earned a bachelor's degree from Denison University and a master's degree from Yale Divinity School. He was ordained in the Episcopal Church as a deacon on June 2, 1990, and as a priest on April 16, 1991; both ordinations were by Peter J. Lee, Bishop of Virginia.

He was appointed a member of the Order of St John (MStJ) in September 2017.

As Dean of the Cathedral, Hollerith has presided over the state funerals of Jimmy Carter, Dick Cheney, George H.W. Bush, Madeleine Albright, Colin Powell, John McCain, and Lindsey Graham.
