= Herman Hollerith IV =

The Right Reverend Herman Hollerith M.Div.
- Bishop of Southern Virginia
- Church: Episcopal Church
- Diocese: Southern Virginia
- Elected: September 27, 2008
- In office: 2009–2018
- Predecessor: David Conner Bane Jr.
- Successor: Susan Bunton Haynes

Orders
- Ordination: June 11, 1983 (deacon); December 10, 1983 (priest)
- Consecration: February 13, 2009 by Katharine Jefferts Schori

Personal details
- Born: 1955 (age 70–71) Baltimore, Maryland, United States
- Denomination: Anglican
- Spouse: Lizzie Hollerith

Herman "Holly" Hollerith IV (born 1955) was the tenth bishop of the Episcopal Diocese of Southern Virginia, serving from 2009 until 2018.

== Biography ==
Hollerith was born in Baltimore, Maryland in 1955. He studied at Denison University and graduated with a Bachelor of Science. He then studied at the Yale Divinity School from where he earned his Master of Divinity in 1983. He was ordained to the diaconate on June 11, 1983, and to the priesthood on December 10, 1983. He then became assistant at Christ Church in Roanoke, Virginia. He also served as rector of Bruton Parish Church in Williamsburg, Virginia and rector of Prince George Winyah in Georgetown, South Carolina.

He was consecrated on February 13, 2009, and retired on December 31, 2018.

His brother is Randolph Hollerith, the current Dean of Washington National Cathedral.

== See also ==
- List of Episcopal bishops of the United States
- Historical list of the Episcopal bishops of the United States
- Herman Hollerith
