= Nathaniel Beverley Tucker =

American novelist

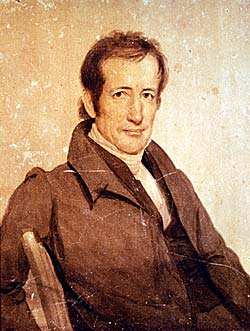
Nathaniel Beverley Tucker (early 19th century)

Nathaniel Beverley Tucker (September 6, 1784 – August 26, 1851) was an American author, judge, legal scholar, and political essayist.

== Life and politics ==
Tucker was generally known by his middle name. He was born into a socially elite and politically influential Virginia family: his father was the noted legal scholar St. George Tucker, and his half-brother was John Randolph of Roanoke. His mother was Frances Bland Randolph Tucker, daughter of Theodorick Bland of Cawsons. Tucker's older brother Henry St. George Tucker, Sr., too, went on to have an eminent career as a law professor and Congressman in antebellum Virginia. His nephew Nathaniel Beverley Tucker, a U.S. diplomat and later secret agent for the Confederacy, was named after him. His daughter Cynthia became a notable preservationist in Virginia.

He graduated from the College of William & Mary in 1801, studied law, and practised in Virginia. After moving with his family to the Missouri territory in 1816, Tucker served as a circuit court judge from 1817 until 1832. He returned to Virginia in 1833 and served as a Professor of Law at William and Mary, his alma mater, from 1834 to his death in 1851.

Tucker opposed the nullification movement in South Carolina, but maintained that individual states had the right to secede from the Union. From the 1830s onward he was a Fire-Eater and a leading academic spokesman for states' rights and Southern unity. He wrote frequently for the Southern Literary Messenger and other periodicals, and carried on an extensive correspondence with influential Southern political leaders, including President John Tyler, Secretary of State Abel P. Upshur, and South Carolina Governor James Henry Hammond.

Tucker was a Freemason. He was one of the Organizers of the Grand Lodge of Missouri and served as its second Grand Master from 1821 to 1824.

He died in Winchester, Virginia, at the age of 66 years.

== Fiction ==
Tucker is probably best remembered for his 1836 novel The Partisan Leader. Set in the United States of 1849, the story depicts a war between secessionist guerrillas in Virginia and a despotic federal government led by President-turned-dictator Martin Van Buren. In Tucker's future, the slaveholding states south of Virginia have already seceded, driven out of the Union by Van Buren's centralizing government and exploitative tariff policy. While the Old Dominion itself remains under federal control, the plot of The Partisan Leader concerns the efforts of patriotic Virginian irregulars to defeat government forces and join the independent Southern Confederacy.

At the onset of the American Civil War in 1861, the novel was regarded by many in the North and South as a prophetic vision of the collapse of the Union. It was republished that year in New York with the subtitle "A Key to the Disunion Conspiracy", and next year in Richmond with the subtitle "A Novel, and an Apocalypse of the Origin and Struggles of the Southern Confederacy".

Tucker wrote two other novels. George Balcombe, also published in 1836, was called "the best American novel" by Edgar Allan Poe. Gertrude was serialized 1844–1845 in the Southern Literary Messenger.

== Works ==
Besides the works already mentioned, he wrote:

- Discourse on the Importance of the Study of Political Science as a Branch of Academic Education in the United States (Richmond, 1840)
- Discourse on the Dangers that threaten the Free Institutions of the United States (1841)
- Lectures intended to Prepare the Student for the Study of the Constitution of the United States (Philadelphia, 1845)
- Principles of Pleading (Boston, 1846).

He left an unfinished life of his half-brother, John Randolph of Roanoke. He wrote a great number of political and miscellaneous essays, and was a large contributor to The Southern Literary Messenger of Richmond, Virginia, and to the Southern Quarterly Review. He also maintained an extensive correspondence with scholars and politicians.

== Bibliography ==
- Robert J. Brugger, Beverley Tucker: Heart over Head in the Old South (Baltimore: Johns Hopkins University Press, 1977).
- Beverley D. Tucker, Nathaniel Beverley Tucker: Prophet of the Confederacy, 1784-1851 (Tokyo: Nan'undo, 1979).
- Drew Gilpin Faust, A Sacred Circle: The Dilemma of the Intellectual in the Old South, 1840-1860 (Philadelphia: University of Pennsylvania Press, 1977).
- "Recent Deaths"; New York Daily Times; September 18, 1851; page 2. (Accessed from The New York Times (1851–2003), ProQuest Historical Newspapers, September 19, 2006).
