= George P. Gunn =

American prelate (1903–1973)

The Right Reverend George Purnell Gunn D.D.
- Bishop of Southern Virginia
- Church: Episcopal Church
- Diocese: Southern Virginia
- In office: 1950–1971
- Predecessor: William A. Brown
- Successor: David Rose
- Previous post: Coadjutor Bishop of Southern Virginia (1948-1950)

Orders
- Ordination: June 1930 by Robert Carter Jett
- Consecration: January 6, 1948 by Henry Knox Sherrill

Personal details
- Born: October 11, 1903 Winona, Mississippi
- Died: June 16, 1973 (aged 69) Norfolk, Virginia
- Denomination: Anglican
- Parents: Elijah Steirling Gunn & Susan Ellwood Carter
- Spouse: Frances Hawkins Purnell (m.1930)
- Children: 3
- Education: University of Virginia

George Purnell Gunn (October 11, 1903 – June 16, 1973) was an American prelate who served as the fifth Episcopal Bishop of Southern Virginia between 1950 and 1971.

== Early life and education ==
Gunn was born on October 11, 1903, in Winona, Mississippi, the son of Rev. Elijah Sterling Gunn and Susan Ellwood Carter. Based on his parents' ancestry, Gunn later became active with the First Families of Virginia. Raised in Halifax County, Virginia, young George attended to the Virginia Episcopal School in Lynchburg between 1921 and 1923. In 1924 he went to Charlottesville for studies at the University of Virginia, graduating with a Bachelor of Arts in 1927. He then traveled to Alexandria to study for the ministry at the Virginia Theological Seminary, graduating in 1930. The same institution awarded him a Doctor of Divinity in 1948. He married Frances Hawkins Purnell on September 3, 1930, and together had three children.

== Ministry ==
Bishop Robert Carter Jett of the Episcopal Diocese of Southwestern Virginia ordained Gunn as a deacon in October 1929 and priest in June 1930. He then became rector of Moore Parish in Altavista, Campbell County, Virginia. In 1932 he left that position and traveled to the eastern part of the Commonwealth to become rector of the Church of the Good Shepherd in Norfolk, Virginia, where he remained till 1948.

== Bishop ==
Gunn was elected Coadjutor Bishop of Southern Virginia on September 17, 1947, during a diocesan special convention called by bishop William A. Brown, who planned to retire in several years after training his successor. He was consecrated on January 6, 1948, by Presiding Bishop Henry Knox Sherrill in a ceremony also attended by many Episcopal bishops. Rt.Rev. Gunn then succeeded as diocesan bishop on January 6, 1950, when Bishop Brown retired. Bishop Gunn continued fulfilling his pastoral and administrative duties as bishop of the diocese with many historic churches as well as booming populations due to military expansion in its Hampton Roads area until his own retirement in 1971. He died in Norfolk, Virginia, on June 16, 1973.
