= Alfred Magill Randolph =

American bishop

The Right Reverend Alfred Magill Randolph D.D., LL.D.
- Bishop of Southern Virginia
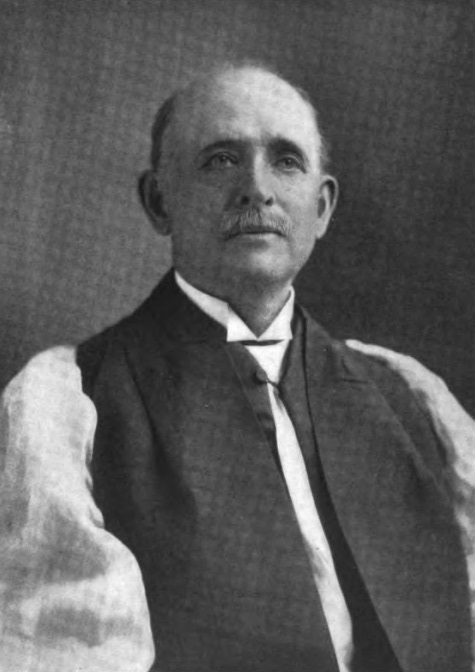
- Church: Episcopal Church
- Diocese: Southern Virginia
- Elected: October 1892
- In office: 1892–1918
- Successor: Beverley D. Tucker
- Previous post: Coadjutor Bishop of Virginia (1883-1892)

Orders
- Ordination: November 18, 1860 by John Johns
- Consecration: October 21, 1883 by Alfred Lee

Personal details
- Born: August 31, 1836 Winchester, Virginia, United States
- Died: April 6, 1918 (aged 81) Norfolk, Virginia, United States
- Buried: Hollywood Cemetery (Richmond, Virginia)
- Denomination: Anglican
- Spouse: Sarah Griffith Hoxton
- Children: 5
- Education: College of William & Mary

Alfred Magill Randolph (August 31, 1836 – April 6, 1918) was the first bishop of Southern Virginia in The Episcopal Church.

== Early and family life ==
Alfred Magill Randolph was born on August 31, 1836, at "the Meadows" in Winchester, Virginia, to Mary Buckner Thruston Magill Randolph and her husband Robert Lee Randolph of Casanova, Virginia. His father's family could trace its ancestry to colonial days and was one of the First Families of Virginia. His ancestor Col. William Randolph of Yorkshire, England emigrated in 1674 and was clerk of Henrico County, Virginia as well as member of the House of Burgesses and rose to Speaker and member of the Royal Council, as well as helped found the College of William and Mary. Alfred Randolph was one of four brothers—his younger brother Buckner Magill Randolph also becoming an Episcopal priest in the Diocese of Virginia. The R. L. Randolph family owned 61 slaves in the 1840 census, and at least 70 in the 1850 census, the last before the patriarch's death.

After education by private tutors, Alfred Randolph attended the College of William & Mary in Williamsburg, from which he graduated in 1855. He then moved to Alexandria to study for the ministry, and graduated from the Virginia Theological Seminary in 1858. He later received honorary doctorates from William & Mary in 1876, Washington and Lee University in 1887, and the University of the South in 1902.

On April 27, 1859, he married Sarah (Sallie) Griffith Hoxton of Alexandria, whose late father William W. Hoxton had served as a U.S. Army doctor. Their children included Dr. Robert Lee Randolph (1860-1919), Elizabeth L. Randolph Ambler (1862-1910), Mary T. Randolph (1865-1873), Alfred M. Randolph Jr (1868-1927), Sallie W. Randolph (1870-1891), Evelyn B. Randolph Wright (1872-1923), Eleanor C. Randolph Garnett (1875-1958) and Frances H. Randolph Taylor (1878-1957).

== Career ==
After graduation, the newly ordained deacon was assigned to St. George's Church in Fredericksburg, Virginia, whose long-serving rector, Dr. McGuire, suffered a fatal heart attack just two weeks later. The young minister took charge of the parish so well that five months later he was made rector at age 22, shortly after being ordained an Episcopal priest in 1860. During the American Civil War, Fredericksburg was subject to repeated shelling and severe fighting, so Rev. Randolph evacuated with his family in 1862.

Rev. Randolph became a chaplain in the Confederate Army and served from 1862 to 1865. After the war ended, Rev. Randolph briefly led a parish in Halifax, Virginia.

After Bishop John Johns consolidated the Unionist and Confederate parishes, Rev. Randolph returned to Alexandria and served as rector at historic Christ Church from January to September 1867. He left the parish in the autumn to accept the rectorship at Emmanuel Church in Baltimore, Maryland, where he served from 1867 to 1883.

In 1883, Randolph was named assistant bishop of Virginia, to serve under Rt.Rev. Francis McNeece Whittle. Presiding Bishop Alfred Lee of Delaware led the service of consecration at Baltimore's Emmanuel Church, joined by John Williams of Connecticut, William B. W. Howe of South Carolina, Thomas Underwood Dudley of Kentucky, Burgess, William Stevens Perry of Iowa, and George William Peterkin of West Virginia, among others. He moved to Richmond, but visited throughout the large diocese.

When the Diocese of Southern Virginia was created in 1892, he became its first bishop and established his seat at Norfolk. Rt. Rev. Randolph believed strongly in education, including for African Americans and women, and became President of the Bishop Payne Divinity School in Petersburg, as well as President of the Boards of Trustees of St. Paul's Normal and Industrial School in Lawrenceville and of the Sweet Briar Institute in Amherst.

== Death and legacy ==
Bishop Randolph died at his home in Norfolk on April 6, 1918, succeeded by his co-adjutor since 1906 Beverley D. Tucker. Rt. Rev. Tucker also presided over the funeral service at St. Paul's Church in Norfolk, which included a Confederate honor guard. Former Maryland Confederate soldier and President of the House of Deputies Rev. Randolph Harrison McKim, who had succeeded Rev. Randolph at Alexandria's Christ Church delivered a eulogy at his other former parish, Emmanuel Church in Baltimore.
