= Episcopal Diocese of Ohio =

Episcopal Church diocese in the US

Diocese of Ohio Dioecesis Ohioensis
- Seal of the Diocese of Ohio

Location
- Country: United States
- Territory: 48 northern counties of Ohio
- Ecclesiastical province: Province V

Statistics
- Congregations: 80 (2025)
- Members: 11,907 (2025)

Information
- Denomination: Episcopal Church
- Established: January 5, 1818
- Cathedral: Trinity Cathedral
- Language: English

Current leadership
- Bishop: Anne B. Jolly

Map
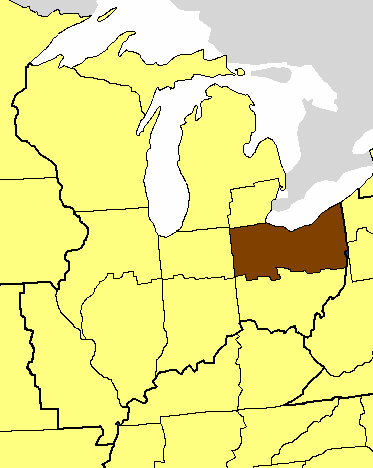

Website
- dohio.org

The Diocese of Ohio is diocese of the Episcopal Church in Ohio, United States. It was organized in 1817 and was the first diocese established outside of the original 13 colonies. The first bishop was Philander Chase. Since that time the Diocese has been served by 11 additional bishops. The 12th and current bishop, the Right Reverend Anne B. Jolly was ordained and consecrated as bishop in April 2023.

The Diocese of Ohio includes 80 parishes in the northern 48 counties of the State of Ohio. The diocese was contiguous with the state of Ohio, but was divided into two dioceses in 1875, due to the geographical size of the diocese and the poor health of Bishops MacIlvaine and Bedell. The Episcopal Diocese of Ohio, which retained the original name, and the Diocese of Southern Ohio headquartered in Cincinnati. It is one of 15 dioceses that make up the Province of the Midwest (Province 5).

In 2025, the diocese reported average Sunday attendance (ASA) of 3,897 persons; this was a relative decrease from 5,937 reported in 2016. Between 2015 and 2025, reported membership declined from 19,288 to 11,907. The 80 congregations of the diocese reported $14,472,085 of plate and pledge income in 2025.

Originally the diocesan see, or headquarters city, was located in Gambier in south-central Ohio, but moved to Cleveland shortly after the diocesan split. Offices are located on Euclid Avenue near Trinity Cathedral, the cathedral of the diocese.

== History ==
As settlers and missionaries moved westward after the Revolutionary War, they brought their faith traditions with them, including those of the newly formed Episcopal Church. In the Ohio Territory, three clergyman served as early missionaries. Efforts in the Ohio Valley were led by Deacon James Kilbourne and Joseph Doddridge, while Roger Searle led efforts in the Western Reserve. Shortly after Ohio was admitted to the Union, the first Episcopal church was established in the state at Worthington, near present-day Columbus in 1804. After years of fruitless petitions and through the hard work of missionaries and others, the General Convention of the Episcopal Church granted Ohio a separate diocese in 1818.

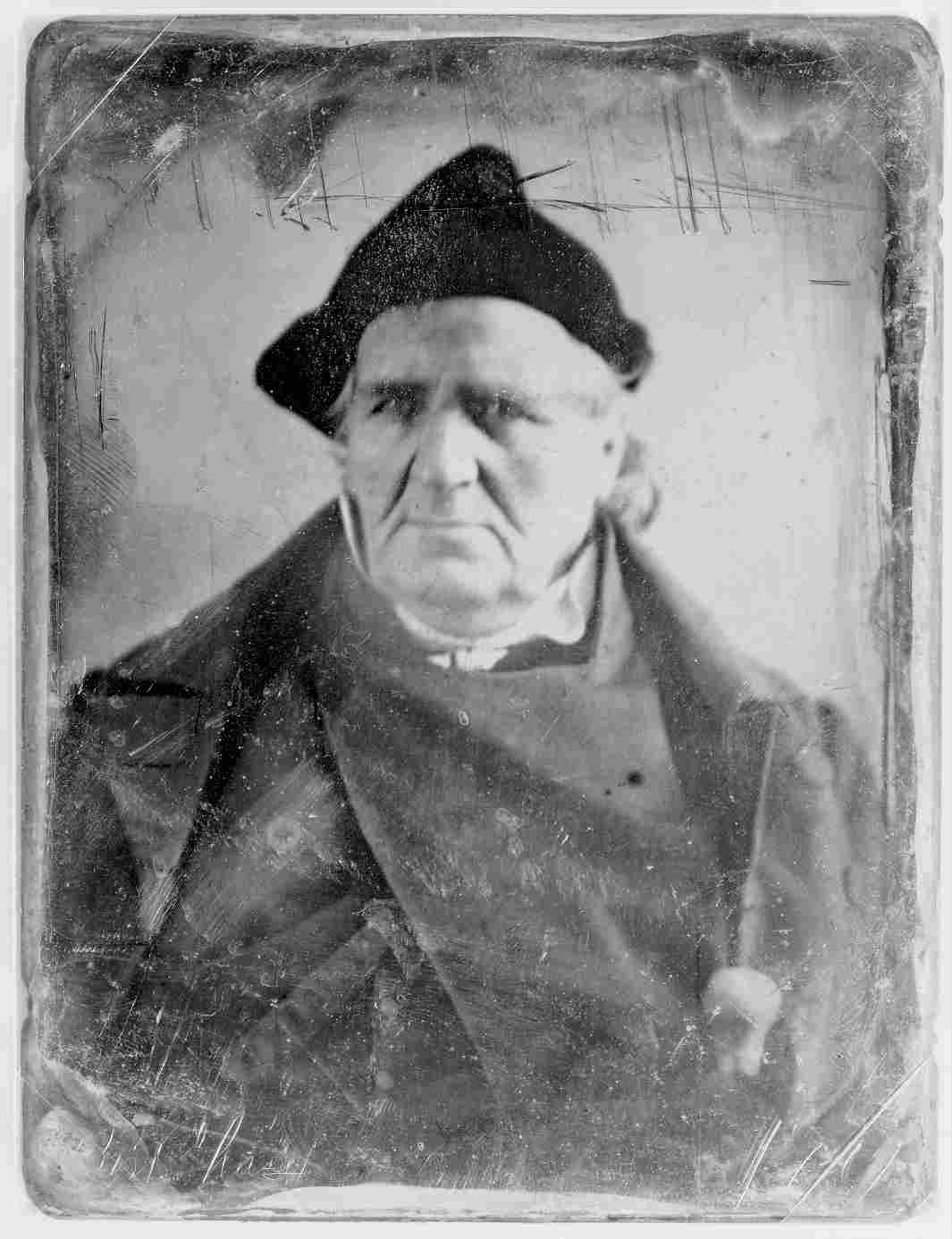
Philander Chase

Philander Chase was elected first Bishop of Ohio in 1818 and consecrated as such in 1819. Chase returned from a fund raising trip to England in 1823 and established the diocesan headquarters and a new Episcopal college, Kenyon College, in Gambier. Kenyon College and Gambier were named for Lord Kenyon and Lord Gambier, the largest benefactors of the college and new diocese. Bishop Chase resigned after a leadership dispute in 1832 and soon moved to Illinois where he was elected first bishop of the Diocese of Illinois Illinois.

Charles Pettit McIlvaine succeeded him as Ohio's bishop and Kenyon College's president. The Rt. Rev. Charles McIlvaine was an ardent abolishionist and a leading advocate of the Evangelical movement, which called upon the Episcopal Church to turn from the more Anglo-catholic reforms of the Oxford Movement and return to a purer Protestant expression in the church. In December 1861 Bishop MacIlvaine was part of delegation sent to England by President Abraham Lincoln to assist in counteracting a hostile negative opinion which had arisen following "the Trent Affair."

Upon Bishop McIlvaine's death in 1873, Gregory Thurston Bedell became the Third Bishop of Ohio, having been consecrated as assistant bishop in 1859. Bishop Bedell had staunchly supported the Union in the Civil War, and, like McIlvaine, has been credited with keeping the Episcopal Church unified during this time, unlike many other denominations. In 1875, the General Convention, at the request of the Convention of the Diocese of Ohio, split the diocese into two separate dioceses. The Diocese of Ohio favored more evangelical expression of worship and theology, and Bishop Bedell moved its headquarters to Cleveland at its northeast corner, in the growing urban areas along Lake Erie. Thomas Augustus Jaggar was then consecrated the first bishop of the new Episcopal Diocese of Southern Ohio, which had some parishes favoring more Anglo-catholic styles and established its headquarters in Cincinnati in the state's southwestern corner.

William Andrew Leonard was consecrated as the Fourth Bishop of Ohio in 1889 and was responsible, with financial backing from William G. Mather, for constructing Trinity Cathedral, completed in 1907. Charles F. Schweinfurth designed the structure in English Perpendicular Gothic form from Indiana limestone. Diocesan offices were located in the adjoining church house, where they remain.

== Bishops ==
=== Current ===
Anne B. Jolly was consecrated as the 12th Bishop of Ohio on April 29, 2023 "Office of the Bishop". The Diocese of Ohio.

=== Former ===
Bishops who have served the diocese include:

1. Philander Chase (1819-1832)
2. Charles Pettit McIlvaine (1832-1873)
3. Gregory T. Bedell (1873-1889)
4. William Andrew Leonard (1889-1930)
5. Warren Lincoln Rogers (1930-1938)
6. Beverley D. Tucker (1938-1952)
7. Nelson M. Burroughs (1952-1967)
8. John Harris Burt (1967-1983)
9. James R. Moodey (1983-1994)
10. J. Clark Grew II (1994-2004)
11. Mark Hollingsworth, Jr. (2004-2023)
