= Episcopal Diocese of Southern Virginia =

Episcopal Church diocese in the US

Coordinates: 37°05′31.4″N 76°27′53.9″W

Diocese of Southern Virginia

Location
- Country: United States
- Ecclesiastical province: Province III

Statistics
- Congregations: 100 (2025)
- Members: 17,475 (2025)

Information
- Denomination: Episcopal Church
- Established: November 23, 1892
- Cathedral: None

Current leadership
- Bishop: Susan Bunton Haynes

Map
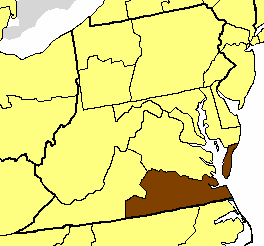
- Location of the Diocese of Southern Virginia

Website
- diosova.org

Episcopal Diocese of Southern Virginia is the diocese of the Episcopal Church in the United States of America located in the southeast area of Virginia. It is in Province III (for the Middle Atlantic region). The diocese includes the Hampton Roads area, Richmond south of the James River, most of the region known as Southside Virginia, and both Northampton and Accomack Counties of the Eastern Shore of Virginia.

The diocese reported 26,382 members in 2015 and 17,475 members in 2025. Plate and pledge income for the 100 filing congregations of the diocese in 2025 was $23,091,604. Average Sunday attendance (ASA) in 2025 was 6,356 persons.

The Diocese of Southern Virginia was created as a split from the Diocese of Virginia in 1892. The Diocese of Southwestern Virginia split off from the Diocese of Southern Virginia in 1919. The diocesan offices are in Newport News.

Susan Bunton Haynes was consecrated the Eleventh Bishop of Southern Virginia in a ceremony held in Williamsburg, Virginia on February 1, 2020.

Chanco on the James is an outdoor ministry of the diocese, named for the Powhatan Christian Chanco. It is a retreat center for youth and adults, as well as one of the longest running summer camp programs in Virginia. It is situated on 125 acres of woods surrounded by natural wildlife along the James River in Surry.

== Historical significance ==
When English colonists established Jamestown, Virginia on May 14, 1607, those settlers built one of the first churches in the New World, in what would eventually become the Diocese of Southern Virginia. The Jamestown church also became the meeting place of the first New World legislative assembly on July 30, 1619, but was ultimately burned down (with most of the city) in Bacon's Rebellion. On Sunday June 24, 2007, Presiding Bishop Katharine Jefferts Schori led the celebration of the 400th anniversary of the first Anglican service of Holy Communion in the New World at Jamestown.

After the statehouse burned in 1698, the capital of the Colony of Virginia moved to the City of Williamsburg, which is also now located in the Diocese of Southern Virginia and most famous after restoration as Colonial Williamsburg. Williamsburg's historic church, Bruton Parish, located on Duke of Gloucester Street, remains active today. As the colonial era ended, when the House of Burgesses gathered for sessions in Williamsburg, American patriots George Washington, Thomas Jefferson, and Patrick Henry, among others, worshipped at Bruton Parish.

The Diocese also includes St. John's Episcopal Church, Elizabeth City Parish, in Hampton, Virginia. Established in 1610, St. John's is the oldest English-speaking Parish in continuous existence in the United States. The parish occasionally uses Communion silver (a chalice and two patens) crafted in 1618. This communion silver has the longest history of continuous use in the United States of any English church silver.

== Bishops ==
The Diocese of Southern Virginia has had eleven diocesan bishops:

1. Alfred M. Randolph (1892–1918)
  Beverley D. Tucker Coadjutor (1906–1918)
2. Beverly D. Tucker (1918–1930)
  Arthur C. Thomson Suffragan (1917–1919); Coadjutor (1919–1930)
3. Arthur C. Thomson (1930–1937)
4. William A. Brown (1938–1950)
  George P. Gunn Coadjutor (1948–1950)
5. George P. Gunn (1950–1971)
  David S. Rose Suffragan (1958–1964); Coadjutor (1964–1971)
6. David S. Rose (1971–1978)
  C. Charles Vache Coadjutor (1976–1978)
7. C. Charles Vache (1978–1991)
  Frank Vest Coadjutor (1989–1991)
8. Frank Vest (1991–1998)
  O'Kelley Whitaker Assisting Bishop (1992–1997)
  David Conner Bane Jr. Coadjutor (1997–1998)
9. David Conner Bane Jr. (1998–2006)
  Donald Purple Hart Assisting Bishop (1998–2001)
  Carol Joy W.T. Gallagher Suffragan (2002–2005)
  Robert Hodges Johnson Assisting Bishop (2006)
  John Clark Buchanan Assisting Bishop (2006–2009)
10. Herman Hollerith IV (2009–2018)
11. Susan Bunton Haynes (2020–present)
