= Jaggar =

Jaggar is a surname. Notable persons with that surname include:

- Alison Jaggar (born 1942), American feminist author
- Dave Jaggar (born 1967), New Zealander computer scientist
- Thomas Augustus Jaggar (1839–1912), American bishop
- Thomas Jaggar (1871–1953), American volcanologist
