= William A. Jones (bishop of Missouri) =

Bishop of Missouri

The Right Reverend William Augustus Jones D.D.
- Bishop of Missouri
- Church: Episcopal Church
- Diocese: Missouri
- Elected: December 7, 1974
- In office: 1975–1992
- Predecessor: George L. Cadigan
- Successor: Hays Hamilton Rockwell

Orders
- Ordination: July 25, 1952 by Theodore N. Barth
- Consecration: May 3, 1975 by John Allin

Personal details
- Born: January 24, 1927 Memphis, Tennessee, United States
- Died: October 11, 2020 (aged 93) Kennett Square, Pennsylvania, United States
- Denomination: Anglican
- Parents: William Augustus Jones & Martha Wharton
- Spouse: Margaret Loaring Clark (m. 1949; died 2020)
- Children: 4
- Education: Southwestern At Memphis; Yale University

William Augustus Jones Jr. (January 24, 1927 - October 11, 2020) was an American prelate of the Episcopal Church, who served as the eighth Bishop of Missouri, from 1975 to 1992.

== Early life and education ==
Jones was born on January 24, 1927, in Memphis, Tennessee, the son of William Augustus Jones and Martha Wharton. He was educated at the Memphis High School, and then studied at Southwestern At Memphis from where he earned a Bachelor of Arts in 1948. He also graduated with a Bachelor of Divinity after studies at the Yale University in 1951. On August 26, 1949, he married Margaret Loaring Clark, and together had four daughters.

== Ordained ministry ==
Jones was ordained deacon on January 1, 1952, by Bishop Edmund P. Dandridge of Tennessee, at St John's Church in Memphis, Tennessee. He was ordained priest on July 25, 1952, by Bishop Theodore N. Barth, Coadjutor of Tennessee, at the Church of the Messiah in Pulaski, Tennessee. He served as priest-in-charge of the Church of the Messiah until 1957, when he became curate at Christ Church in Nashville, Tennessee. In 1958, he became rector of St Mark's Church in LaGrange, Georgia, while in 1965, he transferred to Mountain Brook, Alabama, to serve as associate rector of St Luke's Church. A year later, in 1966, he became the Director of The Association for Christian Training and Service in Memphis, a post he held until 1972. Between 1972 and 1975, he served as rector of St John's Church in Johnson City, Tennessee.

== Bishop ==
On December 7, 1974, Jones was elected Bishop of Missouri during a special diocesan convention held at Christ Church Cathedral in St. Louis. He was consecrated on May 3, 1975, by Presiding Bishop John Allin. Bishop Jones was the first Bishop of Missouri to ordain a woman to the priesthood in 1976. He was also active in the Civil Rights movement in the South and fought for funds to continue hospital services for people in need in inner city St. Louis. Jones retired in 1992, and spent a year as a minister at St Margaret's Church in Rainham, Kent, England. Jones died on October 11, 2020.
