= William Scarlett (bishop) =

American bishop

The Right Reverend William Scarlett D.D., LL.D.
- Bishop of Missouri
- Church: Episcopal Church
- Diocese: Missouri
- Elected: January 28, 1930
- In office: 1933–1952
- Predecessor: Frederick Foote Johnson
- Successor: Arthur C. Lichtenberger
- Previous post: Coadjutor Bishop of Missouri (1930-1933)

Orders
- Ordination: May 16, 1910 by Edwin Stevens Lines
- Consecration: May 6, 1930 by Boyd Vincent

Personal details
- Born: October 3, 1883 Columbus, Ohio, United States
- Died: March 28, 1973 (aged 89) Castine, Maine, United States
- Buried: Castine Cemetery, Castine, Maine
- Denomination: Anglican
- Parents: William Scarlett & Myra Siebert
- Spouse: Leah Oliver Van Riper (m. 1941)
- Education: Harvard University

William J. Scarlett (October 3, 1883 – March 28, 1973) was Bishop of the Episcopal Diocese of Missouri, serving from 1930 to 1952.

== Early life and education ==
Scarlett was born in Columbus, Ohio on October 3, 1883, the son of William Scarlett and Myra Siebert. He graduated from Harvard University with a Bachelor of Arts in 1905, and was honored with a Doctor of Divinity in 1950. He attended the Episcopal Theological School in Cambridge, Massachusetts, receiving a Bachelor of Divinity in 1909, and a Doctor of Divinity in 1967. He was also awarded a Doctor of Law from the University of Arizona in 1922.

== Ordained ministry ==
Scarlett was ordained deacon in June 1909 by Bishop William Lawrence of Massachusetts. He was later ordained as a priest on May 16, 1910 by Bishop Edwin Stevens Lines of Newark. Initially he served as assistant at St George's Church in New York City between 1909 and 1911, before becoming Dean of Trinity Cathedral in Phoenix, Arizona in 1911. In 1922, he became Dean of Christ Church Cathedral in St. Louis, where he remained till 1930.

== Bishop ==
During the ninety-first annual diocesan convention of January 28, 1930, Scarlett was elected Coadjutor Bishop of Missouri on the first ballot. He was consecrated on May 6, 1930 by Bishop Boyd Vincent of Southern Ohio, in Christ Church Cathedral. He succeeded as diocesan in 1933. Scarlett was well known for his focus on social issues and social justice, particularly during the Great Depression and World War II. He was also a champion of ecumenism, and was one of the founders of the St. Louis Chapter of the Conference of Christians and Jews. He also advocated for the equal rights and condemned racism. He retired in 1952, and later moved to Castine, Maine where he died on March 28, 1973.
