= Kenneth Lester Price Jr. =

American prelate of the Episcopal Church (born 1943)

The Right Reverend Kenneth Lester Price Jr. D.D.
- Suffragan Bishop of Southern Ohio
- Church: Episcopal Church
- Diocese: Southern Ohio
- Elected: June 25, 1994
- In office: 1994–2012
- Other posts: Assistant Bishop of Southern Ohio (2015-present); Provisional Bishop of Pittsburgh (2009-2012)

Orders
- Ordination: 1968 by Wilburn C. Campbell
- Consecration: October 29, 1994 by Edmond L. Browning

Personal details
- Born: 1943 (age 82–83) Charleston, West Virginia, United States
- Denomination: Anglican
- Spouse: Marianne
- Children: 2
- Education: General Theological Seminary
- Alma mater: West Virginia University

Kenneth Lester Price Jr. (born 1943) is an American prelate of the Episcopal Church, who served as Suffragan Bishop of Southern Ohio between 1994 and 2012, and Provisional Bishop of Pittsburgh between 2009 and 2012. Since 2015, he has served as Assistant Bishop of Southern Ohio.

== Early life and education ==
Price was born in Charleston, West Virginia in 1943. He studied at the West Virginia University and graduated with a Bachelor of Arts in 1965. This was followed by a period of study at the General Theological Seminary, which led him to earn his Master of Divinity in 1968. He also graduated with a Master of Arts in Counseling from Marshall University in 1974. He was warded a Doctor of Divinity from the General Theological Seminary in 1995.

== Ordained ministry ==
Price was ordained deacon and priest in 1968 in the Episcopal Diocese of West Virginia. He then served as curate, and then rector, of Trinity Church in Parkersburg, West Virginia. Later, he served as rector of St Andrew's Church in Barboursville, West Virginia. He then became Archdeacon of West Virginia, and rector of St Matthew's Church in Wheeling, West Virginia.

== Bishop ==
On June 25, 1994, Price was elected Suffragan Bishop of Southern Ohio on the third ballot. He was then consecrated on October 29, 1994, in Christ Church Cathedral by Presiding Bishop Edmond L. Browning. He served as interim bishop of Southern Ohio between 2005 and 2007, in the absence of a diocesan bishop. On September 3, 2009, Price was elected Provisional Bishop of Pittsburgh, and served in that capacity, in addition to remaining Suffragan of Southern Ohio, till 2012, when he retired from both posts. In 2015, he became an Assistant Bishop in Southern Ohio. After the retirement of diocesan bishop Tom Breidenthal late in 2020, he was called to offer interim leadership there under the title "Bishop in Southern Ohio" while retaining the canonical status of an assistant bishop and working under the authority of the Standing Committee of the diocese.
