= John McGill Krumm =

American bishop and author

The Right Reverend John McGill Krumm
- VI Bishop of Southern Ohio
- Church: Episcopal Church
- Diocese: Southern Ohio
- Elected: 1970
- In office: 1971–1980
- Predecessor: Roger Blanchard
- Successor: William Grant Black
- Other post: Bishop of the Convocation of Episcopal Churches in Europe (1980–1984)

Orders
- Ordination: December 24, 1938 by W. Bertrand Stevens
- Consecration: March 20, 1971 by John E. Hines

Personal details
- Born: March 15, 1913 South Bend, Indiana, United States
- Died: October 23, 1995 (aged 82) Tustin, California, United States
- Denomination: Anglican
- Parents: William Frederick Krumm, Harriett Vincent McGill
- Education: Virginia Theological Seminary
- Alma mater: University of California at Los Angeles

John McGill Krumm (March 15, 1913 – October 23, 1995) was an American bishop and author. He was the sixth bishop of the Episcopal Diocese of Southern Ohio.

== Early life and education ==
Krumm was born on March 15, 1913, in South Bend, Indiana, the son of William Frederick Krumm and Harriett Vincent McGill. He studied at the University of California at Los Angeles and graduated with a Bachelor of Arts in philosophy in 1935. He also studied at the Virginia Theological Seminary, graduating with a Bachelor of Divinity in 1938. He also earned his Doctor of Philosophy in church history from the Yale Divinity School in 1948. He was awarded a Doctor of Sacred Theology by Kenyon College in 1962, a Doctor of Divinity by Berkeley College and the General Theological Seminary, respectively, in 1975, and a Doctor of Humane Letters by the Hebrew Union College.

== Ordained ministry ==
Krumm was ordained deacon in June 1938 and priest on December 24, 1938. He served as vicar of St Timothy's Church in Compton, California, St Anne's Church in Lynwood, California, and St George's Church in Hawthorne, California, from 1938 to 1941. Between 1941 and 1943 he was assistant at St Paul's Church in New Haven, Connecticut, until he became rector of St Matthew's Church in San Mateo, California, in 1943. In 1948, he was appointed Dean of St Paul's Cathedral in Los Angeles. In 1952, he moved to New York City to become chaplain at Columbia University, a post he retained till 1965. In 1964, he criticized the church's refusal to seat women deputies at General Convention, calling the church “behind the times, out‐of‐date and Victorian in its attitudes.” Then, between 1965 and 1971, he served as rector of the Church of the Ascension in New York City.

=== Bishop ===
In 1970, Krumm was elected the sixth Bishop of Southern Ohio, and consecrated on March 20, 1971, by the presiding bishop, John E. Hines. As bishop, he was a member of the Standing Commission on Ecumenical Relations and was involved with the Consultation on Church Union. He was also one of the first bishops to ordain women in 1977, after the Episcopal church approved the ordination of women to the priesthood. Krumm retired in 1980 and became Bishop of the Convocation of Episcopal Churches in Europe, residing in Paris until his resignation in 1984. In 1983, he became bishop-in-residence at St Paul's Church in Tustin, California, and also Assistant Bishop of Los Angeles. Krumm died suddenly on October 23, 1995, in Tustin, California, after suffering a heart attack.

== Bibliography ==
- Roadblocks to Faith (Morehouse-Gorham, 1954)
- Why I am an Episcopalian (Nelson, 1957)
- Modern Heresies (Seabury Press, 1961)
- Christianity and the New Morality (Henderson, 1965)
- The Art of Being a Sinner (Seabury, 1967)
- Denver Crossroads (Forward Movement, 1979)
- Why Choose the Episcopal Church? Description and contents (Forward Movement, [1974] 1996, rev. ed.)
