= William Grant Black =

American bishop

The Right Reverend William Grant Black D.D.
- VII Bishop of Southern Ohio
- Church: Episcopal Church
- Diocese: Southern Ohio
- Elected: June 23, 1979
- In office: 1980–1992
- Predecessor: John McGill Krumm
- Successor: Herbert Thompson Jr.
- Previous post: Coadjutor Bishop of Southern Ohio (1979-1980)

Orders
- Ordination: April 17, 1962
- Consecration: November 8, 1979 by John Allin

Personal details
- Born: April 17, 1920 Muncie, Indiana, United States
- Died: July 7, 2013 (aged 93) Springfield, Illinois, United States
- Denomination: Anglican
- Spouse: June Marie Mathewson (m. 1942; died 1993) Frances King Mathewson (m. 2000)
- Children: 3
- Education: University of Illinois at Urbana–Champaign; University of Chicago Divinity School
- Alma mater: Greenville College

William Grant Black (April 17, 1920 – July 7, 2013) was seventh bishop of the Diocese of Southern Ohio in The Episcopal Church.

== Early life, education, and military career ==
Black was born on April 17, 1920, in Muncie, Indiana, the son of the Reverend Joseph Charles Black, a Free Methodist minister and Verna Dell Grimes. He attended Urbana High School, graduating in 1937. He graduated with a Bachelor of Arts from Greenville College in 1941. He met June Marie Mathewson at the college, and married on December 3, 1942. In 1942, Black enlisted in the United States Army, training at Fort Benning in Georgia, and graduating as a second lieutenant. He was then sent to New Guinea with the 31st Dixie Division. As a rifle company platoon leader and company commander Captain Black helped lead campaigns in Aitape, Morotai and Mindanao. He was later awarded the Purple Heart and the Silver Star.

Upon his return to the United States after the war, he continued his education, graduating with a Master of Education in History and Philosophy from the University of Illinois at Urbana–Champaign in 1952. Simultaneously, he also did work at the YMCA in Champaign, Illinois. He then pursued studies at the University of Chicago Divinity School, graduating with a Bachelor of Divinity in 1955. In 1973 he was named Divinity School alumnus of the year. In 1980, he was awarded two honorary Doctor of Divinity degrees, one from Kenyon College and another from the Episcopal Theological Seminary in Lexington, Kentucky. Black received an honorary degree from Hebrew Union in 1993.

== Ordained ministry ==
Black became an Episcopalian in 1957, and was made deacon in October 1961; he was ordained to the priesthood on his 42nd birthday, April 17, 1962, at the Rockefeller Chapel. He served as curate, and then priest-in-charge, of Christ Church in Woodlawn, Chicago, before becoming rector of the Church of the Good Shepherd in Athens, Ohio, in 1962. In 1973, he became rector of the Church of Our Saviour in Cincinnati, where he remained till 1979. In the mid-1970s, he was an early champion of the Metropolitan Community Church (MCC), an LGBT religious community that found a home at the Church of Our Savior. He and the church faced opposition from the largely conservative community but stood strong in the face of it, based on principle. He was also an early supporter of ordaining women. Black chaired the human relations commission in Athens & was on the civil rights commission in Cincinnati where he also was in an ecumenical-interreligious study group consisting of Christians, Jews and Muslims. While in Athens, he served on Governor Rhodes' mental health & retardation commission and as a governor's appointee on the 13 - state Appalachian Regional Commission with Senators Taft (OH) & Byrd (WVa). He also chaired the new hospital (O'Bleness) construction board in Athens, 1969–1971.

== Bishop ==
Black was elected Coadjutor Bishop of Southern Ohio on June 23, 1979, and was consecrated on November 8, 1979, with Presiding Bishop John Allin as chief consecrator. He succeeded as diocesan bishop in 1980, retiring in 1992. After the death of his first wife, June Marie Mathewson Black, in 1993, Black married Frances King Mathewson on May 15, 2000. He died on July 7, 2013, of complications from Parkinson's disease.
