= Henry Hobson =

American bishop

The Right Reverend Henry Wise Hobson D.D.
- IV Bishop of Southern Ohio
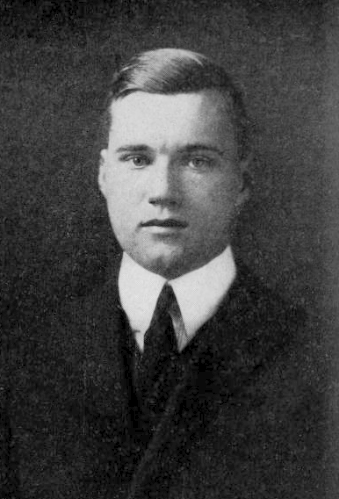
- At Yale in 1914
- Church: Episcopal Church
- Diocese: Southern Ohio
- Elected: January 28, 1930
- In office: 1931–1959
- Predecessor: Theodore I. Reese
- Successor: Roger Blanchard
- Previous post: Coadjutor Bishop of Southern Ohio (1930-1931)

Orders
- Ordination: June 15, 1920 by William Lawrence
- Consecration: May 1, 1930 by Boyd Vincent

Personal details
- Born: May 16, 1891 Denver, Colorado, United States
- Died: February 10, 1983 (aged 91) Cincinnati, Ohio, United States
- Denomination: Anglican
- Parents: Henry Wise Hobson I & Katherine Sophia Thayer
- Spouse: Edmonia Taylor Bryan (m. 1918)
- Children: 4; Katharine Bryan Hobson (b. 1919); Henry Wise Hobson III (b. 1921); Anne Jennings Hobson (1924-1959); Margery Thayer Hobson (b. 1926)
- Education: Yale University; Episcopal Divinity School

Henry Wise Hobson II (May 16, 1891 - February 10, 1983), was the bishop for the Episcopal Diocese of Southern Ohio. When he was consecrated at the age of 38 in 1930, he was the youngest Episcopal bishop in the United States, and at his death, he was the oldest bishop in the Episcopal Church. He was also involved with the founding of Forward Movement Publications at the Episcopal Church.

== Early life ==
Hobson was born in Denver, Colorado on May 16, 1891, the son of Henry Wise Hobson I & Katherine Sophia Thayer. He graduated from Phillips Academy, Andover, Massachusetts in 1910 and Yale University in 1914. He was an officer in the infantry during World War I and was awarded the Distinguished Service Cross for his heroism in France, after being wounded twice. After the war he entered the Episcopal Divinity School in Cambridge, Massachusetts, and graduated in 1920.

== Ordained ministry ==
Hobson was ordained deacon on December 5, 1919 by Samuel G. Babcock, Suffragan Bishop of Massachusetts, and then priest on June 15, 1920 by Bishop William Lawrence of Massachusetts. After ordination he became assistant minister at St John's Church in Waterbury, Connecticut between 1920 and 1921. He then became the rector of All Saints' Church in Worcester, Massachusetts in 1921. On January 28, 1930, Hobson was elected Coadjutor Bishop of Southern Ohio, during the fifty-sixth annual convention of the diocese. He was consecrated on May 1, 1930 in Christ Church by Bishop Boyd Vincent, former Bishop of Southern Ohio. He then succeeded as diocesan bishop on October 13, 1931, upon the death of Bishop Reese.

== Family ==
His son Henry Wise Hobson III married Elizabeth Mary Balch in 1941. His daughter Margery Thayer Hobson married Gerard Thomas on February 13, 1955. Henry Wise Hobson died on February 10, 1983.
