= Roger Blanchard =

American bishop

The Right Reverend Roger Wilson Blanchard
- V Bishop of Southern Ohio
- Church: Episcopal Church
- Diocese: Southern Ohio
- Elected: 1958
- In office: 1959–1970
- Predecessor: Henry Hobson
- Successor: John McGill Krumm
- Previous post: Coadjutor Bishop of Southern Ohio (1958-1959)

Orders
- Ordination: March 1937 by Henry Knox Sherrill
- Consecration: November 11, 1958 by Henry Knox Sherrill

Personal details
- Born: September 11, 1909 Brockton, Massachusetts, United States
- Died: February 17, 1998 (aged 88) Bristol, Maine, United States
- Denomination: Anglican
- Parents: Charles Francis Blanchard, Grace Wilson
- Spouse: Patricia Alice Goodwillie (m. 1936; died 1995)
- Education: Episcopal Theological School; Boston University

Roger Wilson Blanchard (September 11, 1909 - February 17, 1998) was an American bishop of the Episcopal Church. He was the church's Bishop of Southern Ohio from 1959 to 1970.

== Early life and education ==
Blanchard was born on September 11, 1909, in Brockton, Massachusetts, the son of Charles Francis Blanchard and Grace Ida Wilson. He was educated in the public schools of Brockton, and then at Boston University, from which he graduated with a Bachelor of Arts in 1932. He then enrolled at the Episcopal Theological Seminary in Cambridge, Massachusetts, and earned a Bachelor of Divinity in 1936. Blanchard married Patricia Alice Goodwillie (1908-1995) on June 11, 1936, and together they had three children. He was awarded honorary Doctor of Divinity degrees by Lake Erie College and Kenyon College, respectively, in 1958.

== Ordained ministry ==
Blanchard was ordained deacon in June, 1936, and priest in March 1937 by Bishop Henry Knox Sherrill of Massachusetts. He served as curate at St Stephen's Church in Lynn, Massachusetts, from 1936 to 1938, and then as rector of St Peter's Church in Beverly, Massachusetts, from 1938 to 1943. In 1943, he became rector of Calvary Church in Columbia, Missouri, while in 1949, he became the executive secretary of the Division of College Work for the national church. In 1956, he became Dean of St John's Cathedral in Jacksonville, Florida, retaining the post till 1958.

=== Bishop ===
In 1958, Blanchard was elected Coadjutor Bishop of Southern Ohio and was consecrated at Christ Church, Cincinnati, on November 11, 1958, with the Presiding Bishop, Henry Knox Sherrill as chief consecrator. He then succeeded as diocesan bishop in May 1959 and remained so until his retirement in 1970. In retirement he served as an assisting bishop in the Diocese of Massachusetts.

Blanchard died on February 17, 1998, following a long illness.
