= Arthur C. Lichtenberger =

American bishop

The Most Reverend Arthur C. Lichtenberger
- 21st presiding bishop of the Episcopal Church
- Church: Episcopal Church
- Appointed: October 11, 1958
- In office: 1958–1964
- Predecessor: Henry Knox Sherrill
- Successor: John E. Hines
- Previous posts: Coadjutor Bishop of Missouri (1951-1952); Bishop of Missouri (1952-1959)

Orders
- Ordination: November 21, 1926 by Logan H. Roots
- Consecration: April 5, 1951 by Henry Knox Sherrill

Personal details
- Born: January 8, 1900 Oshkosh, Wisconsin, United States
- Died: September 3, 1968 (aged 68) Bethel, Vermont, United States
- Buried: Christ Church Cathedral
- Denomination: Anglican
- Parents: Adam Lichtenberger, Theresa Heitz
- Spouse: Florence Elizabeth Tate
- Children: 1
- Education: Kenyon College

Arthur Carl Lichtenberger (January 8, 1900 – September 3, 1968) was a bishop of the Episcopal Church in the United States. He served as Bishop of Missouri from 1952 to 1959, and as presiding bishop of the Episcopal Church from 1958 to 1964.

== Early life ==
Lichtenberger was born in Oshkosh, Wisconsin, where his father ran a grocery store. He attended Kenyon College in Gambier, Ohio, where he played quarterback on the football team and was president of the Sigma Pi fraternity chapter. He was also president of the senior class, chairman of the Commons Committee, president of the Kenyon Masonic Club, lettered in basketball, headed the college choir, and served on both the Collegian and Reveille staffs. He graduated cum laude from Kenyon with a Bachelor of Philosophy degree in 1923 and was chosen by the English Department to give the class address. While working on a farm in Iowa during a summer in college he met his future wife, Florence Tate. The couple had two children, a son and a daughter. Their daughter died during her infancy.

== Early ministries ==
Lichtenberger was influenced to join the priesthood by his father-in-law, the Reverend Martin Tate, and entered the Episcopal Theological School in Cambridge, Massachusetts. He earned his Bachelor of Divinity degree in 1925, and did his postgraduate work at the General Theological Seminary in Manhattan. He was ordained a deacon on March 21, 1925, and a priest on November 21, 1926.

He began his ministry as missionary professor of New Testament at St. Paul's Divinity School in Wuchang, China. He and his family were forced to flee during a Communist uprising in 1927 and lost all their possessions. In 1928 he returned to the U.S. to be rector of Grace Church in Cincinnati, Ohio for five years, then rector of St. Paul's Church in Brookline, Massachusetts, for eight years. After serving as dean of Trinity Cathedral in Newark, New Jersey he went back to teaching as professor of pastoral theology at General Theological Seminary in New York City.

== Bishop ==
In 1951 he became the Bishop of Missouri, and he held that post until he was elected the presiding bishop in 1958. As Bishop of Missouri he initiated congregational studies on the church's mission and established new congregations. In 1956 he assumed the chairmanship of an Episcopal delegation studying the problems of the Church of South India.

In 1958 he was an attendee of the Lambeth Conference in London.

In 1961 he was the first Episcopal Church leader to meet with a pope when he met Pope John XXIII at the Vatican. The meeting was commemorated with his image on a stamp from the Vatican post office.

In 1963, Princeton University gave him an honorary degree of Doctor of Divinity.

On February 21, 1963, the church completed work on the Episcopal Church Center (which had begun in 1958) in New York City. The center housed the national church's missionary, educational, and social work offices.

On November 23, 1963, he received a telegram from Robert F. Kennedy, U.S. attorney general and brother of the late president, asking that he participate in the funeral of John F. Kennedy. Lichtenberger, was recovering from phlebitis at the time and asked Bishop William Creighton to represent him.

He retired from his position in 1964 because of health reasons and became a visiting professor at the Episcopal Theological Seminary.

He died in 1968 in Bethel, Vermont. He owned a farm there where he liked to go fishing.

In 2010 he posthumously received the Founders' Award from the Sigma Pi fraternity.

== Published work ==
- The Way of Renewal: Meditations for the Forty Days of Lent (1960)
- The Church's Schools in a Changing World (1961)
- The Day Is At Hand (1964)

== See also ==
- List of presiding bishops of the Episcopal Church in the United States of America
- List of Episcopal bishops of the United States
- Historical list of the Episcopal bishops of the United States

Episcopal Church (USA) titles
Preceded by Henry Knox Sherrill	21st Presiding Bishop; November 15, 1958 – October 12, 1964	Succeeded by John Elbridge Hines
Preceded by William Scarlett	Bishop of Missouri; 1952–1958	Succeeded by George Cadigan
