= Cadigan =

Cadigan is an Irish surname. Notable people with the surname include:

- Dave Cadigan (born 1965), American football player
- George L. Cadigan (1910–2005), American Catholic bishop
- Pat Cadigan (born 1953), American-born science fiction author
