= Charles Franklin Robertson =

Episcopal Bishop of Missouri

The Right Reverend Charles Franklin Robertson D.D., LL.D., S.T.D.
- Bishop of Missouri
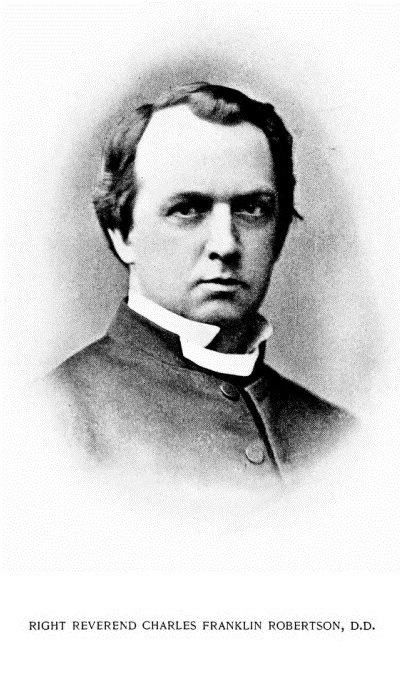
- Church: Episcopal Church
- Diocese: Missouri
- Elected: September 3, 1868
- In office: 1868–1886
- Predecessor: Cicero Stephens Hawks
- Successor: Daniel S. Tuttle

Orders
- Ordination: October 23, 1862 by Horatio Potter
- Consecration: October 25, 1868 by Benjamin B. Smith

Personal details
- Born: March 2, 1835 New York City, New York, United States
- Died: May 1, 1886 (aged 51) St. Louis, Missouri, United States
- Buried: Bellefontaine Cemetery
- Denomination: Anglican
- Parents: James Robertson & Mary Ann Canfield
- Spouse: Rebecca Duane
- Children: 5
- Education: Yale University

Charles Franklin Robertson (March 2, 1835 – May 1, 1886) was the second Bishop of Missouri in The Episcopal Church. He was one of six children born to James Robertson and Mary Ann Canfield Robertson.

== Biography ==
Charles Franklin Robertson graduated with honors from Yale in 1859, and through his studies, became strongly attracted to religious life. He entered the general theological seminary of the Protestant Episcopal Church, where he completed his work and was ordained deacon on June 29, 1862. Later that same year, on October 23, he was advanced to priesthood by Bishop Potter and was assigned to St. Mark's Parish in Malone, New York.

On September 1, 1868, he was called to the rectorship of St. James Parish in Batavia, New York, and two days later was elected Bishop of the Diocese of Missouri. He visited every parish and mission in the state of Missouri during the first year of his episcopate, and established new missions wherever he found a knot of church people unoccupied.

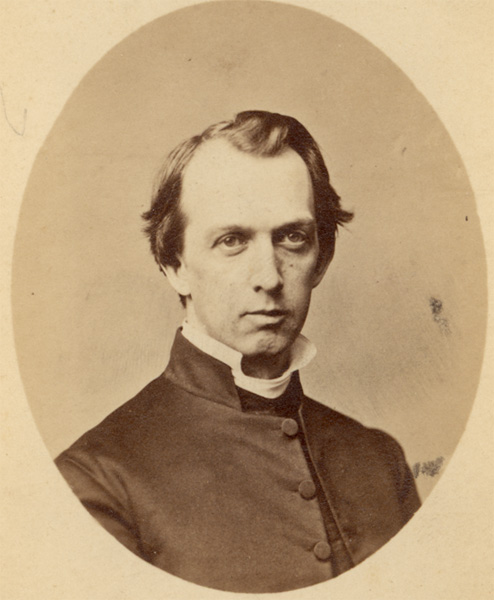
Charles Franklin Robertson

At the end of his eighteen years' episcopate, the number of churches and diocese had greatly increased, and the revenue of the church had tripled. Robertson rapidly became an influential member of the House of Bishops, and was honored with a full share of the labors connected with the administration of the general institutions of the church. He was responsible for the establishment of the Parochial Trust Fund (now the Corporation of the Episcopal Diocese of Missouri) to hold the title to church property. Charles Franklin Robertson established a school for girls that lasted more than 40 years and provided young women with a classical education, and also founded the first Diocesan newspaper in 1870, which was published until the 1930s.

Charles soon married Rebecca Duane Robertson, and gave birth to Albert Robertson. Albert did not live long, dying during the family's relocation to St. Louis, Missouri. Charles and Rebecca had two more children, James and Frances.

Robertson was vice president of the St. Louis Social Science Association and the National Conference of Charities and Correction. He was an active member of the Missouri Historical Society and the historical societies of Virginia, Wisconsin, Maryland, Kansas, and Georgia. In recognition of his learning and contributions to knowledge, he was honored by several universities, receiving the degree of Doctorate of Sacred Theology from Columbia College in New York in 1868, Doctor of Divinity from the University of the South in Sewanee, Tennessee in 1883, and Doctor of Laws in English (L.L.D.) from the university of the state of Missouri in 1883.

His funeral was held at Christ Church Cathedral in St. Louis on May 4, 1886, and he was buried in Bellefontaine Cemetery in St. Louis, Missouri.

== See also ==
- Historical list of bishops of the Episcopal Church in the United States of America
