= Thomas E. Breidenthal =

American bishop (1951–2026)

The Right Reverend Thomas Edward Breidenthal Ph.D.
- IX Bishop of Southern Ohio
- Church: Episcopal Church
- Diocese: Southern Ohio
- Elected: November 11, 2006
- In office: 2007–2020
- Predecessor: Herbert Thompson Jr.
- Successor: Wayne Smith; Provisional Bishop
- Other posts: Seminary professor, University trustee

Orders
- Ordination: 1981 (deacon); June 12, 1982 (priest) by Matthew P. Bigliardi
- Consecration: April 28, 2007 by Katharine Jefferts Schori

Personal details
- Born: March 3, 1951 Jersey City, New Jersey, U.S.
- Died: May 14, 2026 (aged 75)
- Denomination: Anglican
- Parents: Leslie Theron Breidenthal & Ruth Veach
- Spouse: Margaret Garner (m. 1984)
- Children: 2
- Education: University of Victoria; Church Divinity School of the Pacific
- Alma mater: Portland State University

Thomas Edward Breidenthal (March 3, 1951 – May 14, 2026) was an American Episcopal bishop who served as the ninth Bishop of Southern Ohio from 2007 to 2020.

== Early life and education ==
Breidenthal was born on March 3, 1951, in Jersey City, New Jersey, to Leslie Theron and Ruth Veach Breidenthal. He was raised in Europe and the Midwest until his family settled in Eugene, Oregon. He attended high school as a theater major at the Interlochen Arts Academy. He earned a B.A. from Portland State University and an M.A. in English Literature from the University of Victoria. He received his M.Div. from the Church Divinity School of the Pacific in 1981.

== Ordination and Ministry ==
Breidenthal was made a deacon in 1981 by Matthew Paul Bigliardi, Bishop of Oregon. He was later ordained a priest on June 12, 1982, by Bishop Bigliardi.

He pastored or assisted congregations in Oregon (1981–1983, 1989–1992), Oxford (1983–1986), and New York, as well as serving as a high school chaplain at The Harvard School in Studio City, California. Breidenthal was an Episcopal Church Foundation Fellow at Oxford University being awarded the degree of Doctor of Philosophy in Theology. From 1992 through 2001 he was the John Henry Hobart Professor of Christian Ethics and Moral Theology at The General Theological Seminary in New York City. While in New York, Breidenthal was an assisting priest at the Church of St. Mary the Virgin, Times Square. He was director of the Center for Jewish-Christian Studies at GTS from 1992 to 2001. He then went on to serve as Dean of Religious Life and of the Chapel at Princeton University.

From 2003 to 2009, Breidenthal served as Episcopal Church chairman of the Anglican-Roman Catholic Dialogue Consultation in the United States (ARCUSA). He also served as a member of the General Board of Examining Chaplains.

== Episcopacy ==
Breidenthal was elected the ninth bishop of Southern Ohio on November 11, 2006, at the diocesan convention, held in Vern Riffe Center for the Arts on the campus of Shawnee State University in Portsmouth, Ohio. He was later consecrated on April 28, 2007, at the Mershon Auditorium, Ohio State University in Columbus.

At the 2009 diocesan convention, Breidenthal announced that he would lift the ban on blessing of same-sex unions in the diocese starting in 2010. He was one of four nominees for Presiding Bishop of the Episcopal Church in 2015.

On September 18, 2020, Breidenthal announced his retirement on November 29, 2020, citing health issues and a desire to focus on recovery from alcoholism.

== Personal life and death ==
Breidenthal served on the boards of Kenyon College, Bexley-Seabury Seminary, and the National Association of Episcopal Schools in addition to various civic and ecumenical engagements. Breidenthal and his wife, Margaret Garner Breidenthal, married in 1984 and had two daughters, Magdalene and Lucy.

The Diocese of Southern Ohio announced on May 2, 2026, that Breidenthal had entered hospice care. He died on the Feast of the Ascension, May 14, 2026, at the age of 75.

== Bibliography ==
- Bodies Politic: Toward a Theology of Christian Households (1993)
- (contributor) Our Selves, Our Souls, and Bodies: Sexuality and the household of God (Cambridge, Massachusetts, Cowley, 1996) ISBN 1561011223
- Christian Households: The Sanctification of Nearness (1997) (Wipf and Stock Publishers, 2004) ISBN 9781592448869
- Sacred Unions: A New Guide to Life-Long Commitment (2006)
- (contributor) Soul Proclamations: Singing the Magnificat With Mary (Forward Movement, 2015) ISBN 9780880284158
- (contributor) White Supremacy, the Beloved Community, and Learning to Listen (House of Bishops, 2020)
- (contributor) Realizing Beloved Community: Report from the House of Bishops Theology Committee (New York: Church Publishing, 2022) ISBN 9781640655928
- (contributor) The Crisis of Christian Nationalism: Report from the House of Bishops Theology Committee (New York: Church Publishing, 2024) ISBN 9781640658035

== See also ==
- List of Episcopal bishops of the United States
- Historical list of the Episcopal bishops of the United States
