= St. Paul Episcopal Cathedral (Cincinnati) =

Coordinates: 39°06′10″N 84°31′05″W

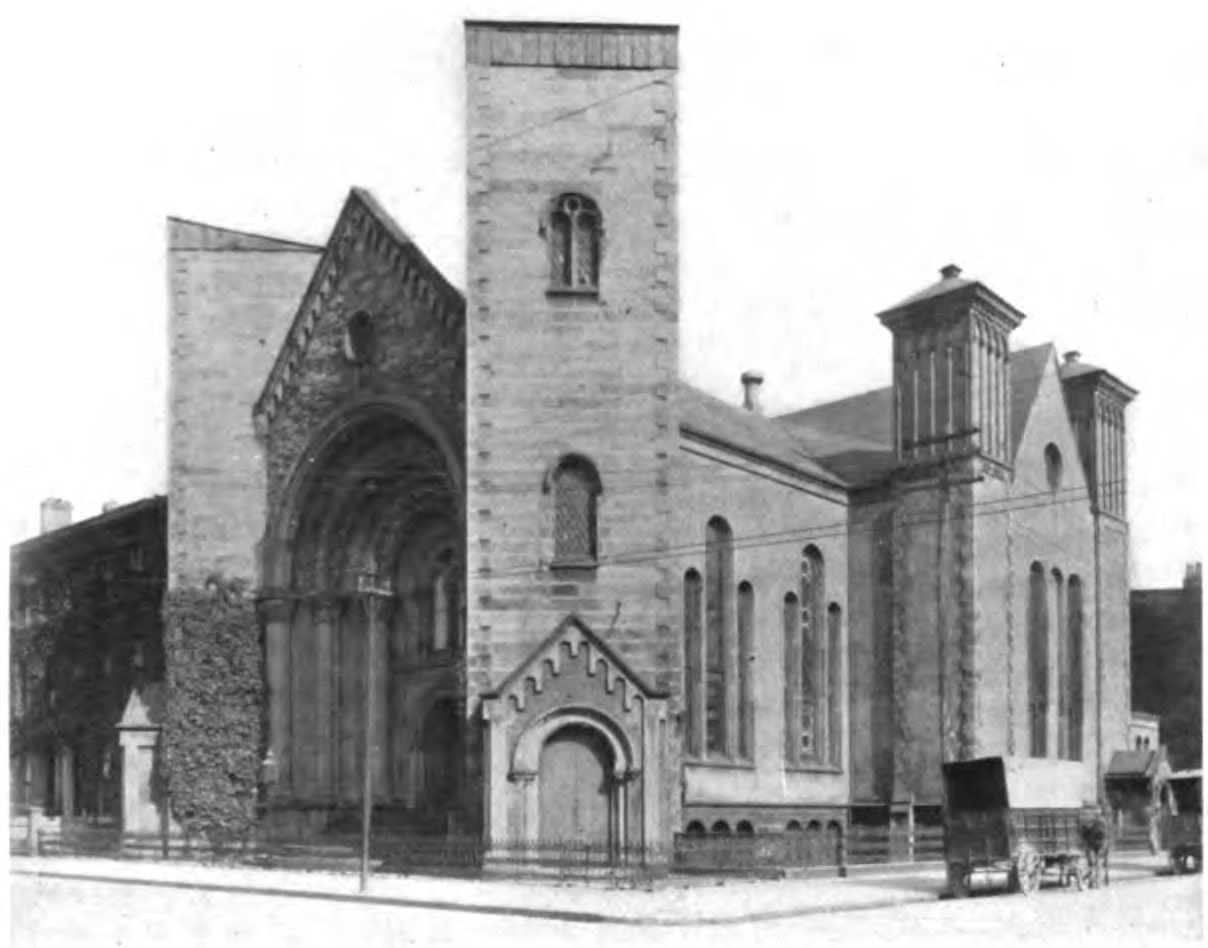
- circa 1912
- St. Paul Episcopal Cathedral
- Location: Cincinnati, Ohio, US
- Denomination: Episcopalian
- Website: N/A

History
- Founded: 1828

Architecture
- Demolished: 1932

The St. Paul Episcopal Cathedral (1852) was located on the southeast corner of Seventh and Plum Streets, in Cincinnati, Ohio. The church was across from the Saint Peter in Chains Cathedral and next to the Plum Street Temple. The original St. Paul's Episcopal Church was located at 111 East Fourth Street. The congregation was formed in 1828 by the Rev. Samuel Johnson, pastor of Christ Church. He had been unable to collect two years of back pay. He won over a sizable portion of the flock to the new church. In 1883 the church merged with St. John's Episcopal Church at Seventh and Plum Streets, which had been formed by the Rev. Nicholson in 1851. The church became the cathedral of the Episcopal Diocese of Southern Ohio.

One guidebook writes of the church, "For decades after the completion of this stately church in 1852, elegant and fashionable Cincinnatians worshiped there." The Rev. Nicholas Hamner Cobbs served this church for several years before becoming Bishop of Alabama. Salmon P. Chase was superintendent of the Sunday school. In November 1875, the Second Annual Meeting of the National Woman's Christian Temperance Union was held at St. Paul's.

The building was demolished in 1937. Many of its members had moved to the suburbs. Today Christ Church Cathedral on Fourth Street is the seat of the Episcopal Diocese of Southern Ohio, and the chapel in the diocesan headquarters next door (which also houses the Forward Movement) is named after St. Paul.
