= St. James Episcopal Church (Zanesville, Ohio) =

Historic church in Ohio, United States

- U.S. National Register of Historic Places
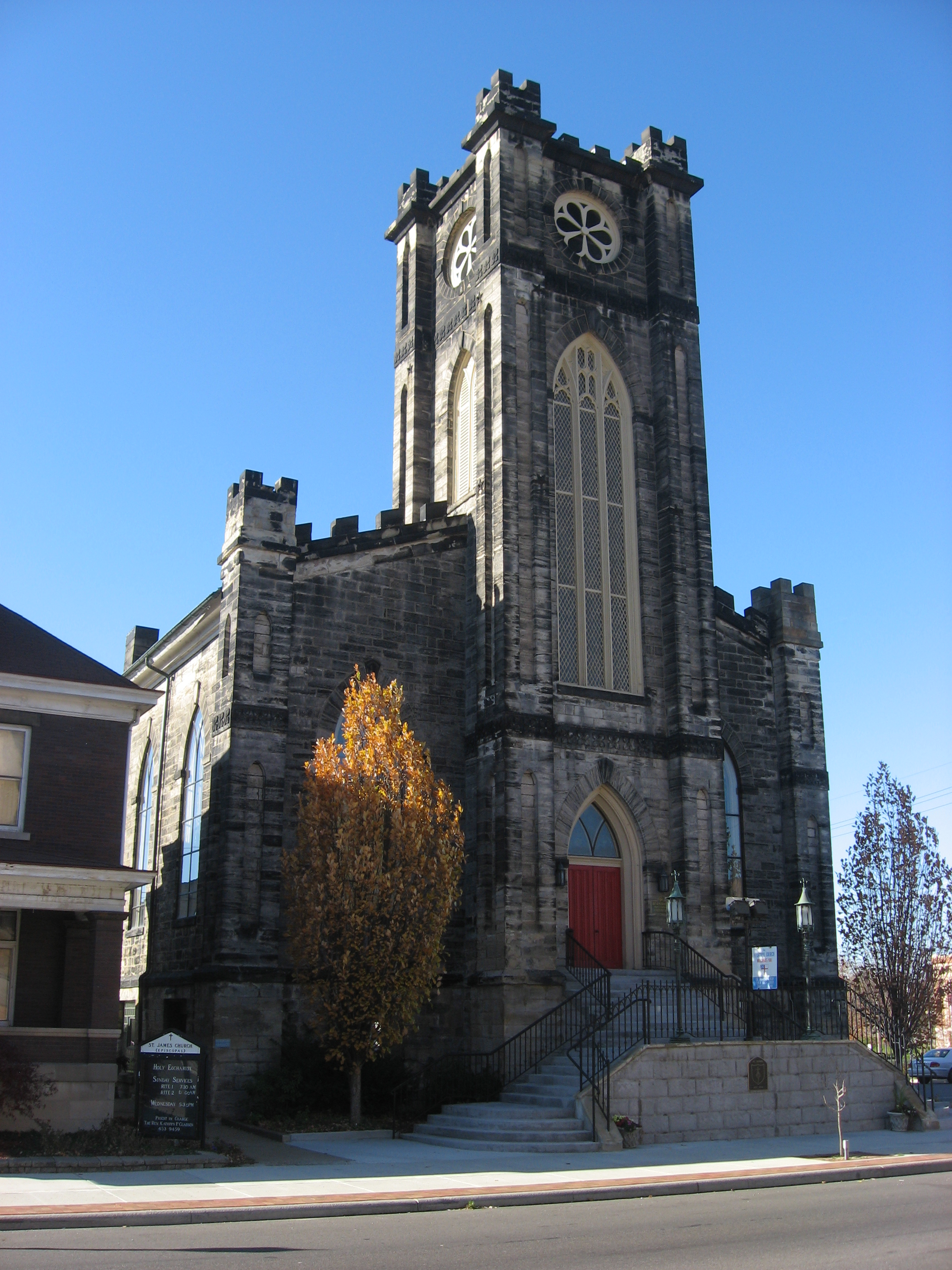

- Location within Ohio Location within the United States
- Location: 155 N. 6th St., Zanesville, Ohio, USA
- Coordinates: 39°56′35″N 82°0′20″W
- Area: less than one acre
- Built: 1843
- Architect: Adams, W.A.
- Architectural style: Gothic Revival
- NRHP reference No.: 78002167
- Added to NRHP: October 2, 1978

St. James Episcopal Church is a historic church at 155 N. 6th Street in Zanesville, in the U.S. state of Ohio. It is a congregation of the Episcopal Diocese of Southern Ohio. In 2019, the church reported 163 members; in 2023, it reported 67 members. Average Sunday Attendance (ASA) reported in 2024 was 41 persons. This was a relative decrease on ASA of 64 in 2020. Plate and pledge financial support reported by the church in 2024 was $118,258.

== History ==
The church was built in 1843 and added to the National Register in 1978.
