= Trinity Episcopal Church (McArthur, Ohio) =

Historic church in Ohio, United States

- U.S. National Register of Historic Places
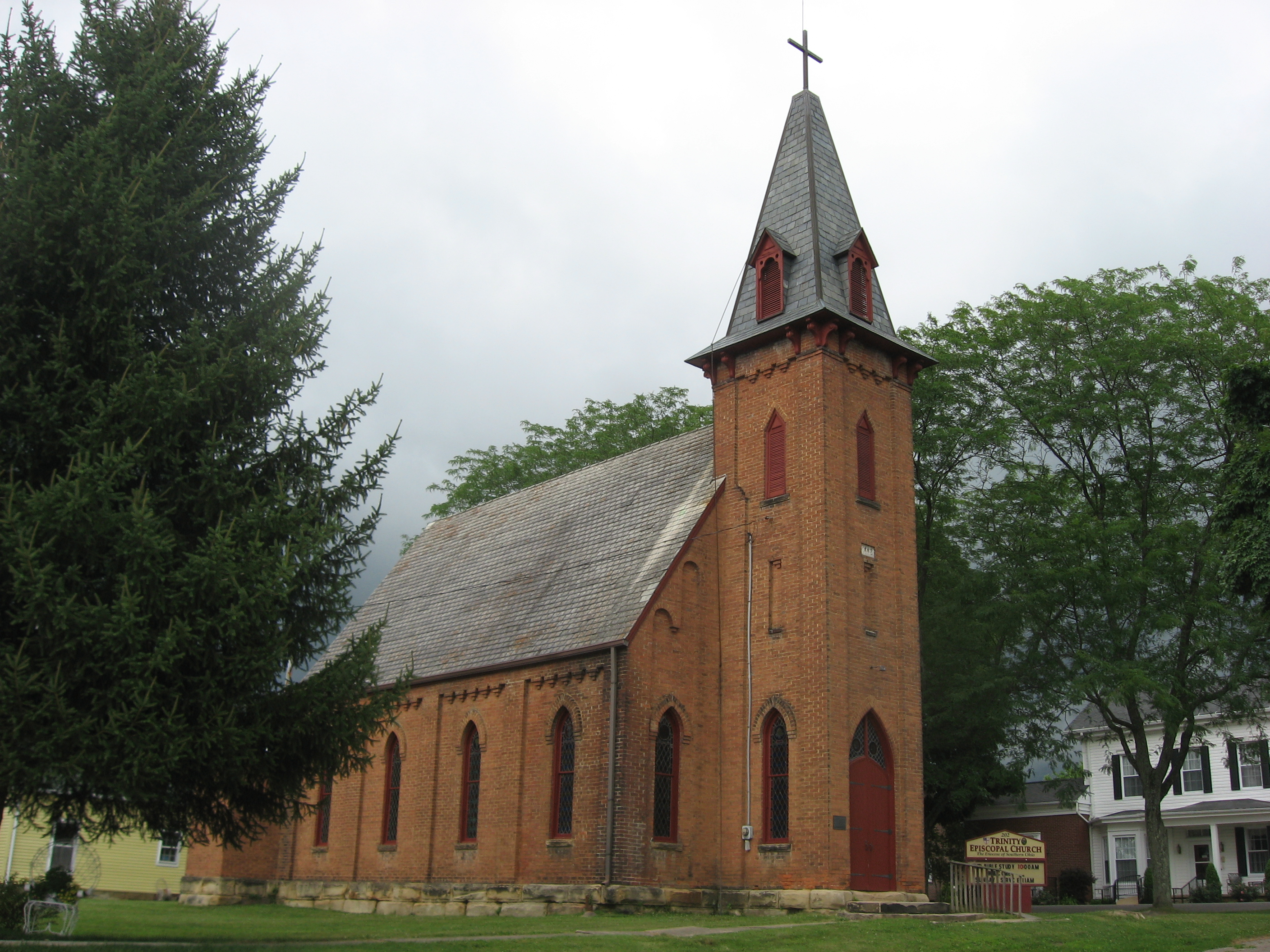
- Front and side of the church

- Location within Ohio Location within the United States
- Location: Sugar and High Sts., McArthur, Ohio
- Coordinates: 39°14′51″N 82°28′49″W
- Area: Less than 1 acre (0.40 ha)
- Built: 1882
- Architect: Oscar W. Gilman
- Architectural style: Late Gothic Revival
- NRHP reference No.: 76001540
- Added to NRHP: March 16, 1976

Trinity Episcopal Church is a parish of the Episcopal Church's Diocese of Southern Ohio in McArthur, Ohio, United States. The parish worships in a historic church located at the intersection of Sugar and High Streets; built in the nineteenth century, it has been designated a historic site.

In 2023, the church reported five members. Plate and pledge financial support reported by the church in 2023 was $7,945. Average Sunday Attendance (ASA) reported in 2024 was five persons. This was a relative decrease on ASA of 35 in 2017.

== Construction ==
Trinity Episcopal Church was built in 1882 on land formerly owned by Andrew Wolf, whose donation included an adjacent house for use as a rectory. The parish employed local contractor Oscar W. Gilman to design the building and to arrange for its construction. Seven years after the church was finished, Gilman was again hired by the church to add the bell tower.

== Architecture ==
Among the hallmarks of Gilman's design are a steep gabled roof, an apse, and buttresses. The church is an example of the Late Gothic Revival style of architecture, due to elements such as its lancet windows of stained glass. The walls are built of handmade bricks that rest upon a foundation of hand-cut sandstone blocks; both the sandstone and the clay for the bricks were obtained locally.

== Recent history ==
In 1976, Trinity Episcopal Church was listed on the National Register of Historic Places because of its well-preserved historic architecture. As a longtime McArthur landmark, it was seen as significant primarily in local history.

Trinity Episcopal Church is an active parish of the Episcopal Diocese of Southern Ohio. In 2012, its pastor was Bruce Smith.
