= Cicero Stephens Hawks =

American bishop

The Right Reverend Cicero Stephens Hawks D.D.
- Bishop of Missouri
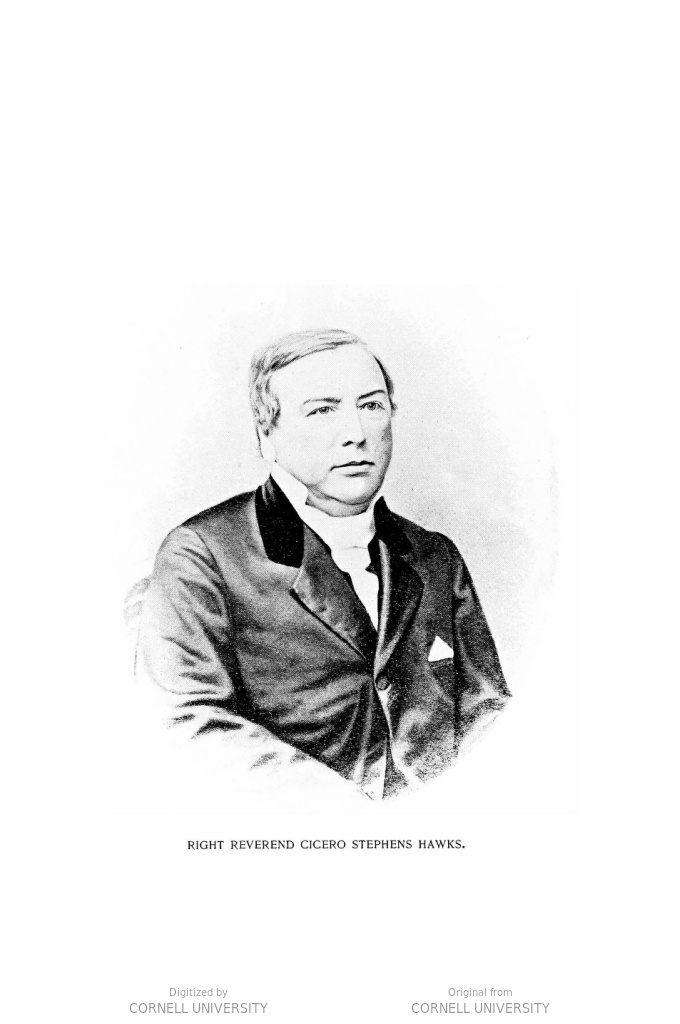
- Church: Episcopal Church
- Diocese: Missouri
- Elected: 1844
- In office: 1844–1868
- Successor: Charles Franklin Robertson

Orders
- Ordination: July 24, 1836 by Benjamin T. Onderdonk
- Consecration: October 20, 1844 by Philander Chase

Personal details
- Born: May 26, 1812 New Bern, North Carolina, United States
- Died: April 19, 1868 (aged 55) St. Louis, Missouri, United States
- Buried: Bellefontaine Cemetery
- Denomination: Anglican
- Parents: Francis Hawks & Julia Airay Stephens
- Spouse: Ann Marie Jones; Ada Leonard

Cicero Stephens Hawks (May 26, 1812 – April 19, 1868) was the first Episcopal bishop of Missouri.

== Biography ==
Hawks was born in New Bern, North Carolina. After an education at the University of North Carolina, Hawks began to study the law, but abandoned it in favor of a clerical occupation. He was ordained deacon on December 8, 1834, and priest on July 24, 1836. His first parishes were in Saugerties and Buffalo, New York. His brothers, Francis Lister Hawks and William Nassau Hawks, were also Episcopal priests. Hawks married Ann Jones in 1835.

He became rector of Christ Church, St. Louis, Missouri in 1844, in what was then the Diocese of Missouri and Indiana. After the diocese was divided, Hawks became the bishop of Missouri. He was the 44th bishop in the ECUSA, and was consecrated on October 20, 1844, by Bishops Philander Chase, Jackson Kemper, and Samuel Allen McCoskry. He received a D.D. from the University of Missouri in 1847. During his service as bishop, he continued to be the rector of Christ Church, serving in both positions until 1854, when he relinquished the rectorship. During a cholera epidemic in 1849, Hawks ministered to the sick of the city. He became ill in 1867, and asked Bishop Thomas H. Vail of Kansas to assist in his parish visitations. Hawks died the following year, on April 19, 1868, and was buried at Bellefontaine Cemetery in St. Louis.

== Sources ==
Conard, Howard Louis (1901). Encyclopedia of the History of Missouri: A Compendium of History and Biography for Ready Reference. Vol. 3. The Southern History Co. p. 206.
