= Deon K. Johnson =

Barbadian-American Anglican bishop

The Right Reverend Deon K. Johnson
- XI Bishop of Missouri
- Church: Episcopal Church
- Diocese: Missouri
- Elected: November 23, 2019
- Installed: June 13, 2020
- Predecessor: Wayne Smith
- Previous posts: Rector St. Paul's Episcopal Church, Brighton, Michigan

Orders
- Ordination: December 19, 2003 by J. Clark Grew II
- Consecration: June 13, 2020 by Wayne Smith
- Rank: Diocesan bishop

Personal details
- Born: Barbados
- Denomination: Anglican
- Parents: Verna Johnson & Henderson Brathwaite
- Spouse: Jhovanny Osorio-Vazquez
- Children: 2
- Education: Case Western Reserve University & The General Theological Seminary

Deon Kevin Johnson is the eleventh bishop of the Episcopal Diocese of Missouri. He was elected on November 23, 2019, and was consecrated and installed on June 13, 2020. His ordination and consecration was originally scheduled for April 25, 2020, but the coronavirus forced a postponement of the event. He succeeded Wayne Smith as Bishop of Missouri.

A native of Barbados, Johnson emigrated to the United States when he was 14 years old. He studied at Case Western Reserve University and graduated with a Bachelor of Arts in English and History in 2000. He also graduated with a Master of Divinity from the General Theological Seminary in 2003. He was ordained deacon on June 15, 2003, and priest on December 19, 2003. After ordination, he served as associate rector at Christ Church in Shaker Heights, Ohio, until 2006, when he became rector at St Paul's Church in Brighton, Michigan. From 2012, he also later served as a consultant at the Office of Black Ministries.

On November 23, 2019, Johnson was elected to the post of Bishop of Missouri, having been elected on the first ballot. He received a majority of the clergy and lay votes in the election. Johnson is the first black gay bishop in The Episcopal Church.

== See also ==
- List of Episcopal bishops of the United States
- List of bishops of the Episcopal Church in the United States of America
