= Kristin Uffelman White =

American prelate of the Episcopal Church

The Right Reverend Kristin Uffelman White
- X Bishop of Southern Ohio
- Diocese: Southern Ohio
- Elected: September 20, 2023

Orders
- Ordination: May 30, 2009 (deacon); December 5, 2009 (priest) by Sanford Hampton (deacon); Jeffrey Lee (priest)
- Consecration: February 17, 2024 by Wendell Gibbs

Personal details
- Born: October 15, 1972 (age 53) Anchorage, AK
- Denomination: Anglican
- Spouse: John
- Children: 1 daughter
- Education: Cottey College (AA); Western Oregon University (BS); Willamette University (MA); Seabury-Western Theological Seminary (M.Div)

Kristin Uffelman White is an Episcopal bishop who is serving as the tenth Bishop of the Diocese of Southern Ohio. She is the first woman to serve that position. Prior to her consecration, she served as the Canon to the Ordinary for Congregational Leadership and Development in the Episcopal Diocese of Indianapolis from 2018 to 2023.

Before ordained ministry, White worked as a high school English teacher in Oregon. She has served congregations in Chicago and Indianapolis. She was born in Anchorage, Alaska and raised in Prineville, Oregon where her father was also an Episcopal priest.

== Episcopacy ==
White was elected on September 30, 2023 at Christ Church Cathedral in Cincinnati, Ohio. She was consecrated February 17, 2024 in Columbus, Ohio at the Greater Columbus Convention Center.

== See also ==
- List of Episcopal bishops of the United States
- Historical list of the Episcopal bishops of the United States
