= Hays Hamilton Rockwell =

American Episcopalian bishop (1936–2025)

The Right Reverend Hays Hamilton Rockwell D.D.
- Bishop of Missouri
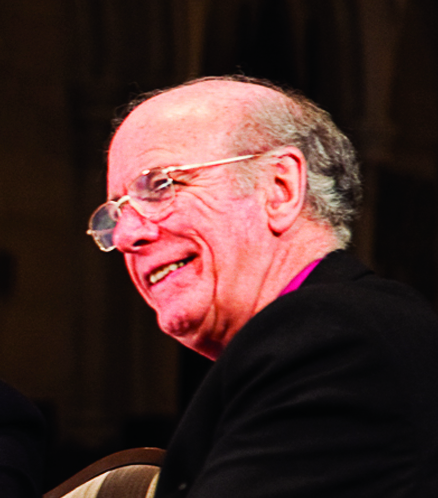
- Rockwell speaks at a 2010 event in New York City.
- Church: Episcopal Church
- Diocese: Missouri
- Elected: October 27, 1990
- In office: 1992–2002
- Predecessor: William A. Jones
- Successor: George Wayne Smith
- Previous post: Coadjutor Bishop of Missouri (1991–1992)

Orders
- Ordination: 1962 by John Seville Higgins
- Consecration: March 2, 1991 by Edmond L. Browning

Personal details
- Born: August 17, 1936 Detroit, Michigan, U.S.
- Died: August 2, 2025 (aged 88)
- Denomination: Anglican
- Parents: Walter Francis Rockwell & Kathryn McElroy
- Spouse: Linda Hullinger (m. 1957)
- Children: 4
- Education: Brown University

Hays Hamilton Rockwell (August 17, 1936 – August 2, 2025) was an American Episcopalian bishop. He was ninth bishop of the Episcopal Diocese of Missouri.

== Early life and education ==
Rockwell was born in Detroit, Michigan, on August 17, 1936, the son of Walter Francis Rockwell and Kathryn McElroy. He was educated at Brown University (B.A., 1958) and the Episcopal Theological School in Cambridge, Massachusetts (B.Div. 1961). He also earned an honorary Doctor of Divinity from Kenyon College in 1974, and from the Seminary of the Southwest in 1984.

== Ordained ministry ==
Rockwell was ordained deacon in 1961 and priest in 1962. He began his priestly career at St. George's School, Middletown, Rhode Island (1961–69) and then moved to Rochester, New York where he served first as chaplain at the University of Rochester (1969–71) and then as dean at Bexley Hall Theological Seminary (1971–76). From there he moved to New York City in 1976 where he served for fifteen years as the fourteenth rector of St. James' Episcopal Church on the Upper East Side. Under his leadership St. James' initiated a ministry for the homeless and became one of the first churches to divest from investments in apartheid South Africa.

In 1976 he was elected to the Anglican Consultative Council.

== Bishop ==
In 1990 he was elected bishop coadjutor of the Diocese of Missouri, becoming bishop diocesan in June 1992. In November 2000, he announced his plan to retire in the summer of 2002. He was succeeded by George Wayne Smith.

== Death ==
Rockwell died on August 2, 2025, at the age of 88.

== See also ==
- List of Episcopal bishops of the United States
- Historical list of the Episcopal bishops of the United States
