= Diocese of Missouri =

Episcopal Church diocese in the US

Diocese of Missouri Diœcesis Missuriensis

Location
- Country: United States
- Ecclesiastical province: Province V
- Coordinates: 38°37′50″N 90°11′54″W

Statistics
- Congregations: 39 (2024)
- Members: 8,708 (2023)

Information
- Denomination: Episcopal Church
- Established: November 16, 1840
- Cathedral: Christ Church Cathedral

Current leadership
- Bishop: Deon K. Johnson

Map
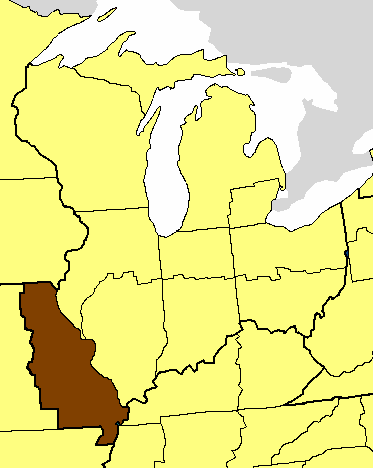
- Location of the Diocese of Missouri

Website
- diocesemo.org

The Episcopal Diocese of Missouri is the diocese of the Episcopal Church in the United States of America with jurisdiction over 54 counties in eastern Missouri. It has 39 congregations and is in Province 5. Its cathedral, Christ Church Cathedral, is in St. Louis, as are the diocesan offices. The current bishop is Deon K. Johnson.

In 2024, the diocese reported average Sunday attendance (ASA) of 2,432 persons, a decrease from 3,559 in 2015. The most recent membership statistics (2023) showed 8,708 members, down from 10,413 reported in 2015. No membership statistics were reported in 2024 national parochial reports. The 39 congregations of the diocese reported $11,035,072 of plate and pledge income in 2024.

== From frontier to the 20th century ==
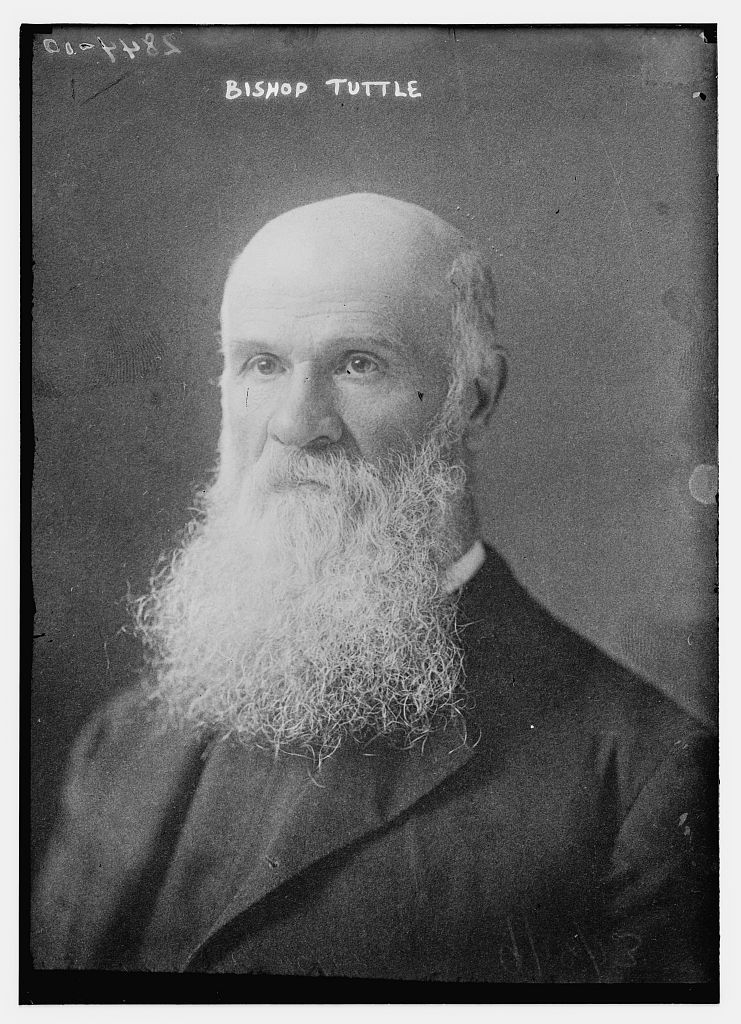
Daniel S. Tuttle, third Bishop of Missouri

The Episcopal Diocese of Missouri was founded in 1841 by the Episcopal congregations that already existed in the state. In 1844, the diocese elected its first bishop, Cicero Hawks, who presided over five priests and nine congregations. He held the diocese together during the Civil War, increasing the reputation of the Episcopal Church in Missouri. After Hawks' death in 1868, the diocese elected Charles F. Robertson as the second bishop of the diocese. By the time of his death in 1886, the diocese had grown to 51 congregations and 40 missions throughout the state. After the election of the third bishop, Daniel S. Tuttle, the Diocesan Convention approved a plan to split the diocese in half. Tuttle supported the newly created Episcopal Diocese of West Missouri by providing funds to sustain it through its first years.

== The church's mission expands ==
As Tuttle aged, the Diocesan Convention appointed Frederick Foote Johnson as bishop coadjutor in 1911. He took over as diocesan bishop upon Tuttle's death in 1923. During Johnson's tenure, the diocese expanded its youth and campus ministries. As Johnson's health failed, the dean of Christ Church Cathedral, William Scarlett, was appointed as bishop coadjutor. He succeeded Johnson in 1930. Scarlett worked tirelessly for social reform, championing the cause of those left jobless and homeless during the Great Depression. In 1935, the Episcopal City Mission was formed to minister to those in jail. He also revitalized the Christian Education system at this time.

== The civil rights movement ==
Scarlett was succeeded by Arthur C. Lichtenberger in 1950. As Bishop, he held a prominent role in the St. Louis civil rights movement. He was elected as the presiding bishop of the Episcopal Church in 1958. He was succeeded as diocesan bishop by George L. Cadigan, who continued Lichtenberger's civil rights mission. Cadigan worked with lay leaders and community members to fight for the rights of African Americans in Missouri. He also gave more control of the church to laity. Cadigan retired in April 1975 and died December 14, 2005.

== Developments ==
William Jones succeeded Cadigan, and he immediately attempted to deal with the discord in the diocese. The Church failed to attract new members to replace those who left over disagreement with the direction the Church was taking, exemplified by a new Book of Common Prayer and the ordination of women.

Jones retired in 1992. He was replaced by Hays Rockwell, who had been elected bishop coadjutor in 1990. Rockwell's episcopacy has been characterized as a time of renewal with an influx of new rectors for many of the congregations, a restructuring of the diocesan staff, an emphasis on congregational development, and maintenance of an Episcopal presence in the city of St. Louis and rural areas of the diocese. Rockwell retired in June 2002 and was replaced by Wayne Smith on June 6, 2002.

Following Smith's decision to retire in 2020, Deon K. Johnson was elected as Bishop on November 23, 2019. Johnson was consecrated as bishop on June 13, 2020.

== Bishops ==
1. Cicero Stephens Hawks (1844-1868)
2. Charles Franklin Robertson (1868-1886)
3. Daniel S. Tuttle (1886-1923)
4. Frederick Foote Johnson (1923-1933)
5. William Scarlett (1933-1952)
6. Arthur C. Lichtenberger (1952-1959)
7. George Leslie Cadigan (1959-1975)
8. William Jones (1975–1992)
9. Hays Hamilton Rockwell (1992-2002)
10. Wayne Smith (2002-2020)
11. Deon K. Johnson (2020-present)
