= Wayne Smith (bishop) =

American bishop

The Right Reverend Wayne Smith
- Bishop Provisional of Southern Ohio; X Bishop of Missouri
- Church: Episcopal Church
- Diocese: Missouri
- Elected: November 3, 2001
- In office: 2002–2020
- Predecessor: Hays Hamilton Rockwell
- Successor: Deon K. Johnson
- Other posts: Provisional Bishop, Southern Ohio (2021-2024)
- Previous post: Coadjutor Bishop of Missouri (2002)

Orders
- Ordination: 1982 by Sam Byron Hulsey
- Consecration: March 2, 2002 by J. Clark Grew II

Personal details
- Born: George Wayne Smith; January 29, 1955 (age 71) Abilene, Texas, United States
- Denomination: Anglican (prev. Baptist)
- Spouse: Debra Morris Smith
- Children: 3
- Education: Baylor University, B.A., M.A. Nashotah House, M.Div. Sewanee, D.Min.

George Wayne Smith (born January 29, 1955) is a bishop of the Episcopal Church. He previously served as the 10th Bishop of the Episcopal Diocese of Missouri from 2002 to his retirement in 2020. He was succeeded by the 11th bishop, the Rt. Rev. Deon K. Johnson, on June 13, 2020. He also served as Bishop Provisional for Episcopal Diocese of Southern Ohio from 2021 to 2024.

Smith was born in Abilene, Texas. He was raised a Baptist and converted to the Episcopal Church while a student at Baylor University. Smith received his seminary education at Nashotah House in Milwaukee, Wisconsin. Smith was ordained as a deacon in 1981 followed by ordination to the priesthood in 1982. Smith served congregations in both Texas and Michigan before becoming the rector of St. Andrew's Episcopal Church in Des Moines, Iowa.

On November 3, 2001 Smith was elected to the post of Bishop of Missouri, having been elected on third ballot. He was consecrated on March 6, 2002 as Bishop Coadjutor to Bishop Hays Rockwell and subsequently succeeded him on June 6, 2002. Smith is the 975th Bishop consecrated in the Episcopal Church.

In the first years of his episcopacy, the church, both nationally and locally, struggled with issues related to sexuality. Financial adversity in those early years resulted in a reduction of diocesan staff and programs. Bishop Smith has supported the growth of the Community of Deacons within the Diocese. The Diocese has entered into a productive companion relationship with the Diocese of Lui in Sudan with clergy and lay persons involved in on-site missions there. Congregations are being called to develop mission within their communities, strengthening their three part call to prayer, community and a presence beyond the church doors.

In a letter dated April 27, 2018, Smith informed the Diocese of Missouri that he intended to retire after a successor was elected, consecrated as bishop, and installed in office. He asked that the election be held during the 2019 diocesan convention, with the winner of the election being seated in April 2020.

On November 23, 2019 the diocese elected Deon K. Johnson as Smith's successor.

Smith was elected Provisional Bishop of the Diocese of Southern Ohio in 2021. He served until 2024, when he was succeeded by Kristin Uffelman White.

== See also ==
- List of Episcopal bishops of the United States
- List of bishops of the Episcopal Church in the United States of America
