= Theodore I. Reese =

Bishop of the Episcopal Diocese of Southern Ohio

The Right Reverend Theodore Irving Reese D.D.
- III Bishop of Southern Ohio
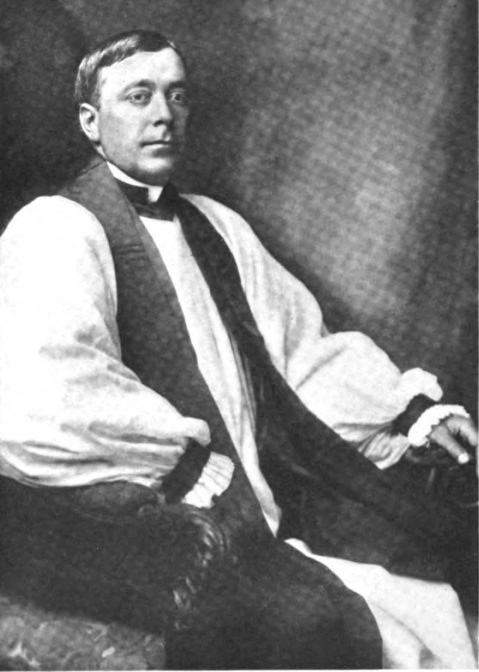
- Church: Episcopal Church
- Diocese: Southern Ohio
- Elected: 1912
- In office: 1929–1931
- Predecessor: Boyd Vincent
- Successor: Henry Hobson
- Previous post: Coadjutor Bishop of Southern Ohio (1913-1929)

Orders
- Ordination: June 28, 1898 by Henry C. Potter
- Consecration: March 25, 1913 by Boyd Vincent

Personal details
- Born: March 10, 1873 New York City, New York, United States
- Died: October 13, 1931 (aged 58) Cincinnati, Ohio, United States
- Buried: Green Lawn Cemetery
- Denomination: Anglican
- Parents: George Bickham Reese & Elizabeth Kip Irving
- Spouse: Louise Comins (m. 1899)
- Education: Cambridge Theological School
- Alma mater: Columbia University

Theodore Irving Reese (March 10, 1873 - October 13, 1931) was bishop of the Episcopal Diocese of Southern Ohio from 1929 to 1931.

== Early life and education ==
Reese was born on March 10, 1873, in New York City, the son of the Reverend George Bickham Reese and Elizabeth Kip Irving. He was a great-nephew of Washington Irving. He was educated at St Paul's School in Concord, New Hampshire, and then at Columbia University from where he graduated with a Bachelor of Arts in 1894. He also studied at the Cambridge Theological School, and earned a Bachelor of Divinity in 1897. He received an honorary Doctor of Divinity from Kenyon College in 1913.

== Ordained ministry ==
Reese was made a deacon by Bishop Ellison Capers in 1897, and then ordained priest on June 28, 1898, by Bishop Henry C. Potter. He married Louise Comins on June 22, 1899. After ordination, he became rector of St Michael's Church in Milton, Massachusetts, while in 1907 he became rector of Trinity Church in Columbus, Ohio, a post he retained till 1913.

== Bishop ==
Reese was elected Coadjutor Bishop of Southern Ohio in 1912, and was consecrated on March 25, 1913, as Coadjutor Bishop of Southern Ohio. He became diocesan bishop in 1929, but died in office two years later.
