= Thomas Augustus Jaggar =

American bishop (1839–1912)

The Right Reverend Thomas Augustus Jaggar
- I Bishop of Southern Ohio
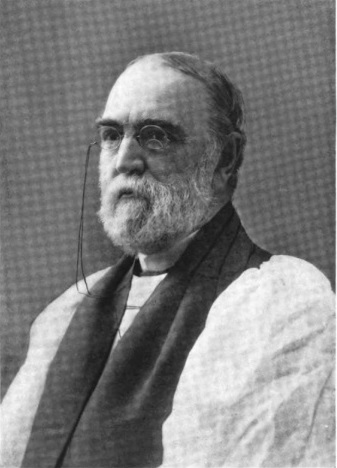
- Church: Episcopal Church
- Diocese: Southern Ohio
- Elected: January 14, 1875
- In office: 1875–1904
- Successor: Boyd Vincent

Orders
- Ordination: June 3, 1863 by Horatio Potter
- Consecration: April 28, 1875 by Benjamin B. Smith

Personal details
- Born: June 2, 1839 New York City, US
- Died: December 13, 1912 (aged 73) Cannes, France
- Buried: Mount Auburn Cemetery
- Denomination: Anglican
- Spouse: Ann Louise Lawrence (m. 1862; died 1908) Mary Elizabeth Jellison (m. 1910)
- Education: General Theological Seminary

Thomas Augustus Jaggar (June 2, 1839 – December 13, 1912) was an American prelate who was bishop of the Episcopal Diocese of Southern Ohio from 1875 to 1904.

== Early life and education ==
Jaggar was born on June 2, 1839, in New York City, the son of Walter Jaggar and Julia Ann Niles. He was educated in New York City by private tuition, before commencing preparation for the ministry while engaging in business. He studied at the General Theological Seminary and graduated in 1860. In 1874, he was awarded a Doctor of Divinity from the University of Pennsylvania.

== Ordained ministry ==
Jagger was ordained deacon on November 10, 1860, and became assistant at St George's Church in Flushing, Queens. In May 1862, he was appointed to, and given charge of, Trinity Church in Bergen Point. He was ordained priest on June 3, 1863, by the Bishop of New York Horatio Potter. In 1864, he became rector of Anthon Memorial Church in New York City (present-day All Souls Church), while in 1868, he succeeded as rector of St John's Church in Yonkers, New York. Between 1870 and 1875, he served as rector of the Church of the Holy Trinity, Philadelphia.

== Bishop and later life ==
He was consecrated bishop on April 28, 1875, with Presiding Bishop Benjamin B. Smith as chief consecrator. Following the election of Boyd Vincent as coadjutor in 1889, he was given oversight of American churches in Europe. He resigned in October 1904, and was named the tenth rector of The Cathedral Church of St. Paul, Boston, Massachusetts in 1906. He died in Cannes, France.

== Family ==
On April 22, 1862, he married Ann Louise Lawrence (1834-1908), daughter of John W. Lawrence and Mary King Bowne, daughter of Walter Bowne. Their son, Thomas Augustus Jaggar, Jr., became a volcanologist. He remarried in 1910, to Mary Elizabeth Jellison.
