= Church of Our Saviour (Cincinnati) =

Coordinates: 39°7′31″N 84°30′37″W

Church of Our Savior
- The Parish Church of Our Savior
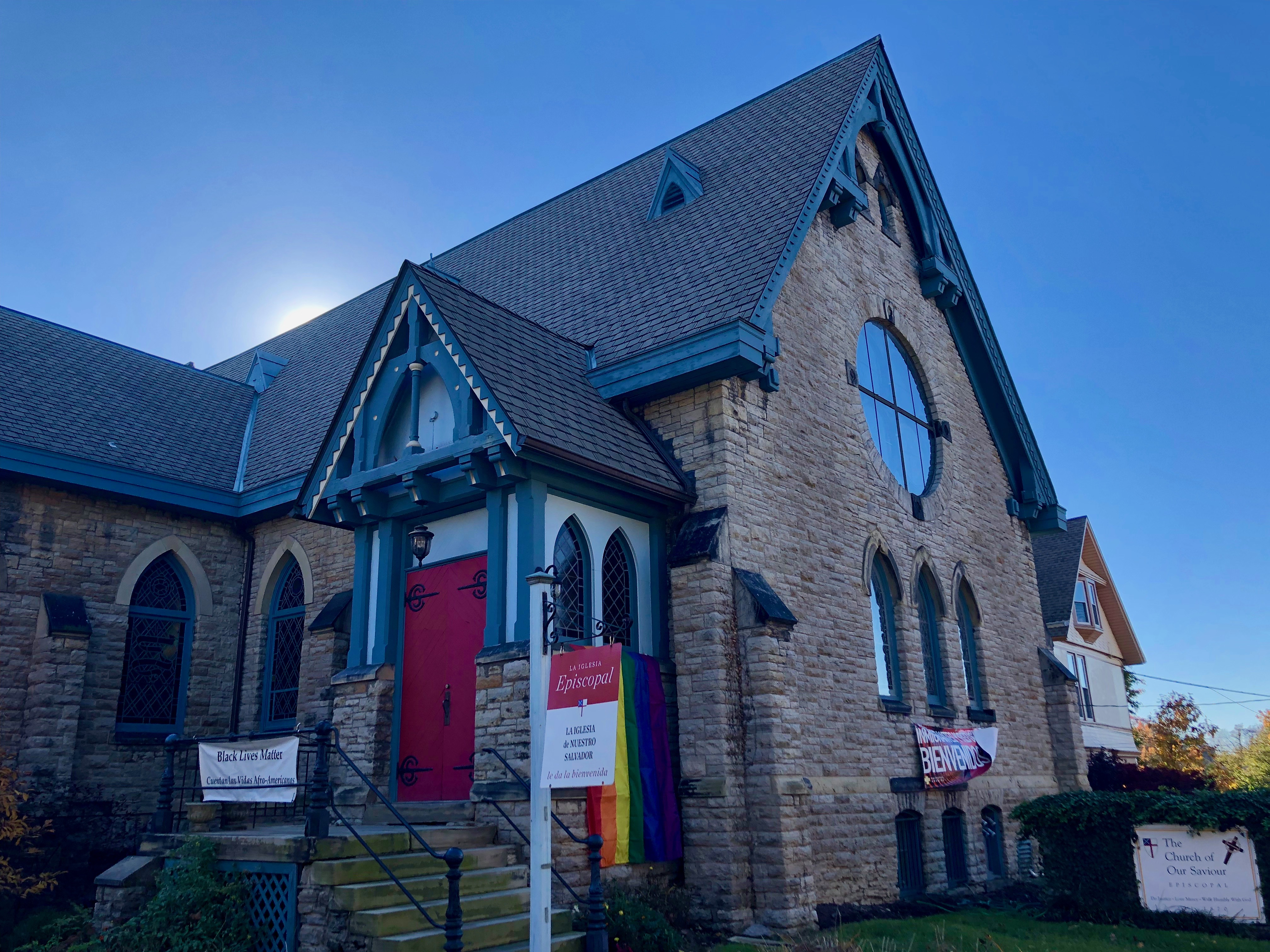
- Church of Our Savior
- Location: 65 East Holister Street, Mount Auburn, Cincinnati, Ohio
- Country: United States
- Denomination: Episcopal Church
- Website: Church of Our Savior

History
- Dedication: Our Saviour, Jesus Christ

Administration
- Province: V
- Diocese: Southern Ohio
- Parish: Our Saviour

Clergy
- Rector: The Rev. Paula Jackson

The Church of Our Saviour, located at 65 East Holister Street in the Mount Auburn neighborhood of Cincinnati, Ohio, is a parish of the Episcopal Diocese of Southern Ohio. The parish's historic stone church was built in 1877 in the Gothic Revival style. Our Saviour was founded by wealthy residents of the once-affluent suburb of Mount Auburn, about 1 mi (1.6 km) north of downtown. Cincinnati annexed Mount Auburn in 1849.

The church reported 105 members in 2022 and 98 members in 2023; no membership statistics were reported nationally in 2024 parochial reports.No membership statistics were reported in 2024 national parochial reports. Plate and pledge income reported for the congregation in 2024 was $99,629. Average Sunday attendance (ASA) in 2024 was 23 persons.

The congregation has, in recent generations, worked for social justice and since the early 1970s, the Church of Our Saviour has also been intentionally open and affirming towards its gay and lesbian members. For 24 years, Cincinnati's Metropolitan Community Church used facilities at the church for worship and other activities. Recently the congregation has reached out to the Latino community, offering bilingual Mass and services to communities of recent immigrants.

The first Head Start program in Mount Auburn began at the church, as did the Mount Auburn Community Council, the Bethany House (a shelter for homeless mothers and children) in the Rectory, and AIDS Volunteers of Cincinnati (AVOC).

The church draws active members from as far away as Dayton, Ohio and Northern Kentucky.

== See also ==
- Church of Our Saviour (disambiguation)
