= Boyd Vincent =

American Episcopal bishop

The Right Reverend Boyd Vincent D.D., S.T.D.
- II Bishop of Southern Ohio
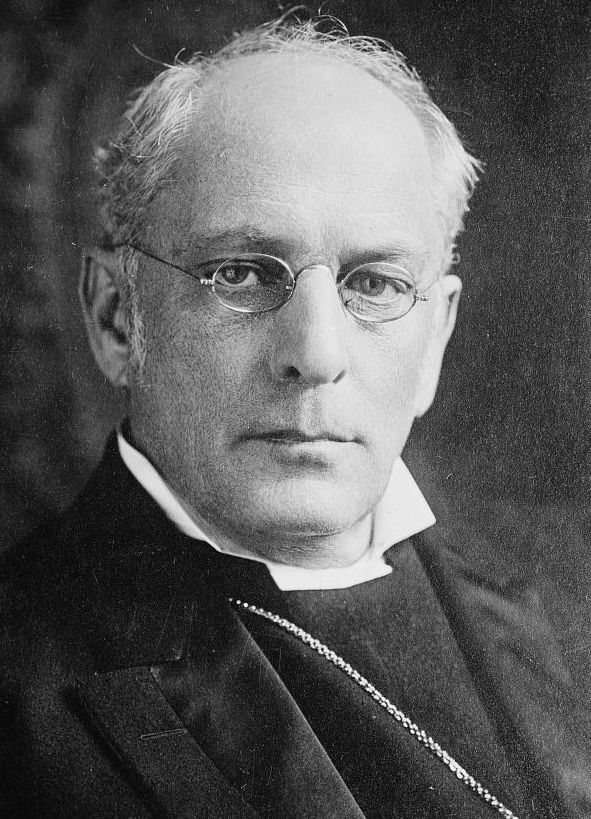
- Church: Episcopal Church
- Diocese: Southern Ohio
- Elected: 1888
- In office: 1904–1929
- Predecessor: Thomas Augustus Jaggar
- Successor: Theodore I. Reese
- Previous post: Coadjutor Bishop of Southern Ohio (1889–1904)

Orders
- Ordination: June 12, 1872 by John Barrett Kerfoot
- Consecration: January 25, 1889 by John Franklin Spalding

Personal details
- Born: May 18, 1845 Erie, Pennsylvania, United States
- Died: January 14, 1935 (aged 89) Cincinnati, Ohio, United States
- Buried: Erie Cemetery
- Denomination: Anglican
- Parents: Bethuel Boyd Vincent & Sarah Ann Strong
- Education: Yale College

Boyd Vincent (May 18, 1845 – January 14, 1935) was a bishop of the Episcopal Diocese of Southern Ohio from 1889 to 1929.

== Biography ==
Vincent was born in Erie, Pennsylvania, on May 18, 1845, the son of Bethuel Boyd Vincent, a banker, and Sarah Ann Strong. He was a younger brother of Brigadier General Strong Vincent. Vincent graduated with a Bachelor of Arts from Yale College in 1867, and attended Berkeley Seminary in Middletown, Connecticut from 1869 to 1871. In 1889, he was awarded a Doctor of Sacred Theology by Trinity College, and a Doctor of Divinity by Kenyon College.

== Ordained ministry ==
Returning home, he was ordained deacon on June 18, 1871, and became assistant at St Paul's Church in Erie, Pennsylvania. He was ordained priest on June 12, 1872 at St Paul's Church by Bishop John Barrett Kerfoot of Pittsburgh. He served as rector of the Church of the Cross and Crown in Erie, Pennsylvania between 1872 and 1874. He then moved to Calvary Church East Liberty in Pittsburgh, Pennsylvania, to serve as rector in 1874.

== Bishop ==
Vincent was elected Coadjutor Bishop of Southern Ohio in 1888, and was consecrated in St Paul's Church, Cincinnati, on January 25, 1889, by Bishop John Franklin Spalding of Colorado. He then succeeded as diocesan bishop in 1904, and remained in office till his resignation in 1929. He died on January 14, 1935.

== Written work ==
He authored Our Family of Vincents in 1924, a privately printed family history, as well as dedicated Strong Vincent High School in Erie in 1930 before his death.
