= Herbert Thompson Jr. =

American bishop

The Right Reverend Herbert Thompson Jr. D.Min.
- VIII Bishop of Southern Ohio
- Church: Episcopal Church
- Diocese: Southern Ohio
- Elected: 1988
- In office: 1992–2005
- Predecessor: William Grant Black
- Successor: Thomas E. Breidenthal
- Previous post: Coadjutor Bishop of Southern Ohio (1988-1992)

Orders
- Ordination: 1965
- Consecration: September 24, 1988 by Edmond L. Browning

Personal details
- Born: 1933 New York City, New York, United States
- Died: August 16, 2006 (aged 72) Italy
- Denomination: Anglican
- Spouse: Russelle Cross (m. 1968; died 2002)
- Children: 3
- Education: General Theological Seminary
- Alma mater: Lincoln University

Herbert Thompson Jr. (December 11, 1933 – August 16, 2006) was an American prelate of the Episcopal Church, who served as the eighth Bishop of Southern Ohio between 1992 and 2005.

== Early life and education ==
Thompson was born in 1933, in The Bronx, New York City, and was raised in Harlem and Fort Greene, Brooklyn. He served in the United States Air Force between 1952 and 1956. He then graduated from Lincoln University in 1962 with a Bachelor of Arts, and enrolled at the General Theological Seminary, graduating in 1965 with a Master of Divinity. He also graduated with a Doctor of Ministry from the United Theological Seminary in 1992, and was awarded honorary doctorates from Berkeley College, Bexley Hall, the General Theological Seminary, Kenyon College, and the Hebrew Union Theological Seminary.

== Ordained ministry ==
Thompson was ordained deacon and priest in 1965 for the Episcopal Diocese of Long Island. He then became vicar of St Gabriel's Church in Brooklyn, serving till 1971 after becoming rector of Christ Church in Bellport, New York. In 1977, he became rector of Grace Church in Jamaica, Queens, where he remained till 1988. He also served as a deputy to General Convention for the Diocese of Long Island, president of the Standing Committee, a Canon of the Cathedral chapter of the Cathedral of the Incarnation, deputy to provincial synod, and executive director of Interfaith Services of Brooklyn.

== Bishop ==
In 1988, Thompson was elected Coadjutor Bishop of Southern Ohio, and was consecrated on September 24, 1988, by Presiding Bishop Edmond L. Browning. He succeeded as diocesan bishop in 1992, and retired in 2005. He died while on vacation in Italy on August 16, 2006.
