= George L. Cadigan =

American bishop

The Right Reverend George Leslie Cadigan D.D.
- Bishop of Missouri
- Church: Episcopal Church
- Diocese: Missouri
- Elected: December 4, 1958
- In office: 1959–1975
- Predecessor: Arthur C. Lichtenberger
- Successor: William A. Jones
- Previous post: Coadjutor Bishop of Missouri (1959)

Orders
- Ordination: September 15, 1936 by John T. Dallas
- Consecration: April 16, 1959 by Arthur C. Lichtenberger

Personal details
- Born: April 12, 1910 Mount Vernon, New York, United States
- Died: December 14, 2005 (aged 95) Topsham, Maine, United States
- Denomination: Anglican
- Spouse: Charlotte Young (m. 1937; died 1943) Jane Jones (m. 1944; died 1993)
- Children: 4
- Education: Amherst College

George Leslie Cadigan (April 12, 1910 – December 14, 2005) was seventh bishop of the Episcopal Diocese of Missouri from 1959 to 1975. He was an alumnus of Amherst College.

== Early life and education ==
Cadigan was born on April 12, 1910, in Mount Vernon, New York, the son of Edward J. Cadigan and Christine Lindbloom. He was educated at the public schools of Mount Vernon and the Episcopal High School in Alexandria, Virginia. He then studied at Amherst College from where he earned a Bachelor of Arts in 1933. Whilst at Amherst he was class president, and played football. He then attended the Episcopal Theological School in Cambridge, Massachusetts, graduating in 1935, and then at Jesus College in Cambridge, England, graduating in 1936. He was awarded a Doctor of Divinity from Amherst College, the University of the South, and Hobart College, respectively.

== Ordained ministry ==
Cadigan was ordained deacon on September 15, 1935, and priest on September 15, 1936, by Bishop John T. Dallas of the Episcopal Diocese of New Hampshire. He initially served as curate at Grace Church in Amherst, Massachusetts and chaplain of Amherst College. In 1937, he became rector of St Paul's Church in Brunswick, Maine, while in 1942, he became rector of Grace Church in Salem, Massachusetts. Between 1948 and 1959, he was rector of St Paul's Church in Rochester, New York.

== Bishop ==
On December 4, 1958, during a special diocesan meeting, Cadigan was elected Coadjutor Bishop of Missouri on the first ballot. He was consecrated on April 16, 1959, by Presiding Bishop and Bishop of Missouri Arthur C. Lichtenberger, whom he succeeded as Bishop of Missouri on May 15, 1959. His episcopacy is credited with growth in the number of Episcopalians in the suburbs surrounding St. Louis, including the creation of new parishes such as in Crestwood, Creve Coeur, Ellisville, Manchester, Northwoods, Spanish Lake, and Warson Woods. He is also credited for beginning major repairs and renovations to Christ Church Cathedral, and creation of a revolving loan program for congregations. Cadigan was also supportive of the ordination of women, and after his retirement, expressed support for the full inclusion of gay and lesbian members in the Church. He retired in 1975, and became a counselor at Amherst College. He also served as chaplain at the University of Massachusetts and served at Grace Church in Amherst, where he once served as curate, until 1984, when he retired of all his posts. He died on December 14, 2005, in Topsham, Maine.

== Family ==
Cadigan married Charlotte Young in 1937, and together they had two children. After her death in 1943, he married Jane Jones on August 15, 1944, and together they had two children.
