= Church of the Messiah (Pulaski, Tennessee) =

Historic church in Tennessee, United States

- U.S. National Register of Historic Places
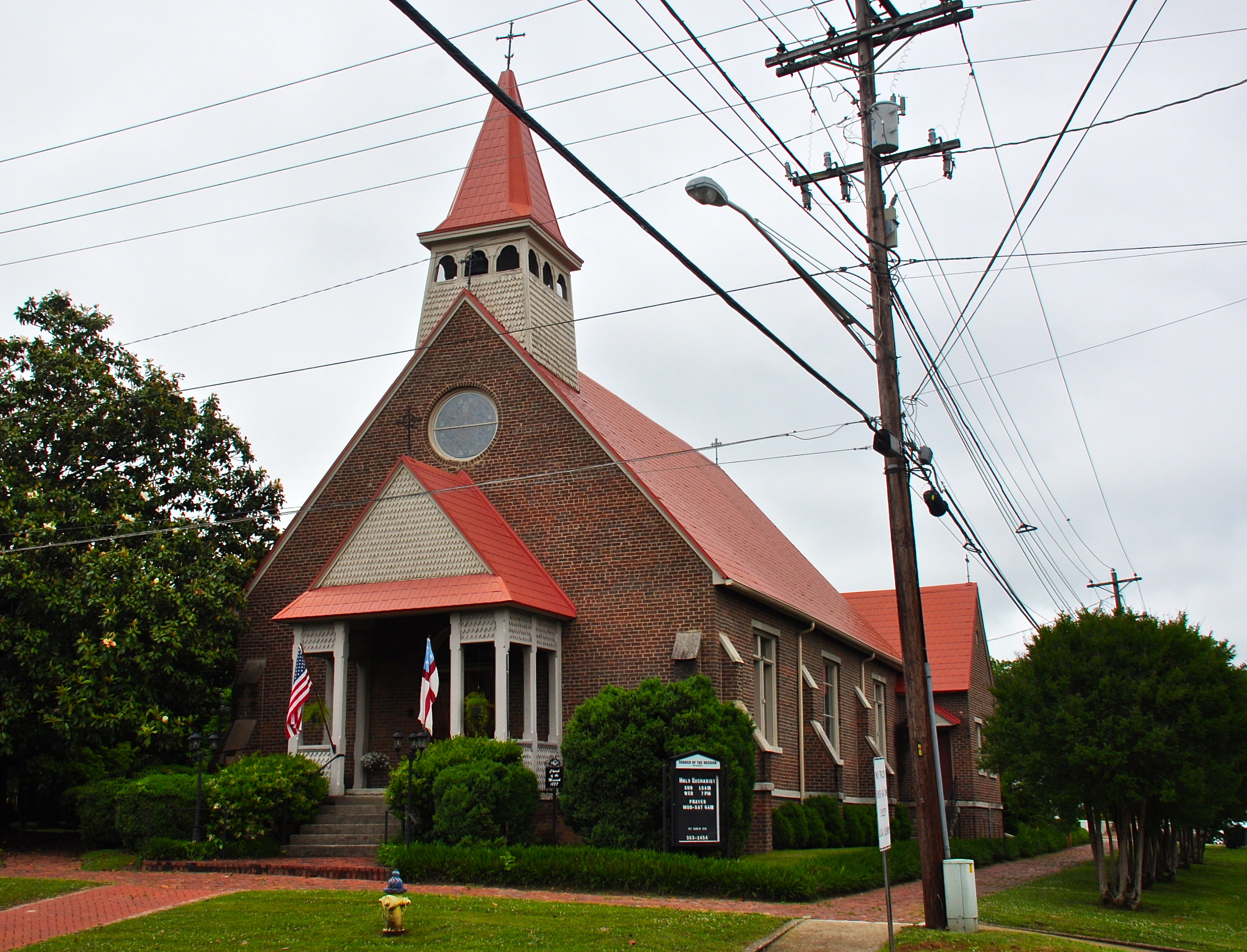
- Church of the Messiah, May 2014.

- Location within Tennessee Location within the United States
- Location: W. Madison and N. 3rd Sts., Pulaski, Tennessee
- Coordinates: 35°12′0″N 87°1′59″W
- Area: less than one acre
- Built: 1887
- Architect: Quintard, George W.
- NRHP reference No.: 83003031
- Added to NRHP: July 28, 1983

The Church of the Messiah, located at 114 North 3rd Street in Pulaski, Tennessee, in the United States, is an historic Episcopal church that is listed on the National Register of Historic Places. It was built in 1887 and designed by architect George W. Quintard, the brother of Charles Quintard, the Episcopal Bishop of Tennessee.

== History ==
The Church of the Messiah was established in 1834.

Its current building was consecrated on December 11, 1887, by Bishop Charles Quintard. Earlier in the year, the setting of the building's cornerstone had been attended by more than 3,000 people, including four Episcopal bishops and a former governor of Tennessee, John Calvin Brown. Money for construction of the church building was donated by Brown and his wife in memory of their daughter, Daisy Brown.

The church building was added to the National Register on July 28, 1983.

== Current use ==
The Church of the Messiah is an actively functioning parish in the Episcopal Diocese of Tennessee. The current Priest-in-Charge is The Rev. Justin Taliaferro.

== See also ==
National Register of Historic Places listings in Giles County, Tennessee
