= Diocese of Southern Ohio =

Episcopal Church diocese in the US

Diocese of Southern Ohio Diœcesis Ohioensis Meridionalis

Location
- Country: United States
- Territory: The Ohio counties of Adams, Athens, Belmont, Brown, Butler, Champaign, Clark, Clermont, Clinton, Darke, Delaware, Fairfield, Fayette, Franklin, Gallia, Greene, Guernsey, Hamilton, Highland, Hocking, Jackson, Lawrence, Licking, Madison, Meigs, Miami, Monroe, Montgomery, Morgan, Muskingum, Noble, Perry, Pickaway, Pike, Preble, Ross, Scioto, Vinton, Warren, and Washington
- Ecclesiastical province: Province V

Statistics
- Congregations: 70 (2025)
- Members: 14,075 (2025)

Information
- Denomination: Episcopal Church
- Established: January 13, 1875
- Cathedral: Christ Church Cathedral
- Language: English, Spanish

Current leadership
- Bishop: Kristin Uffelman White
- Auxiliary Bishops: Kenneth Lester Price Jr. Nedi Rivera; Wendell N. Gibbs, Jr.

Map
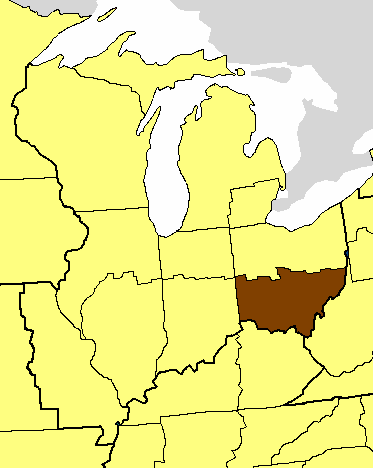
- Location of the Diocese of Southern Ohio

Website
- www.diosohio.org

The Diocese of Southern Ohio is the diocese of the Episcopal Church with jurisdiction over 40 counties in southern Ohio, United States. It is one of 15 dioceses that make up the Province of the Midwest (Province 5). The offices of the Bishop of Southern Ohio and the cathedral, Christ Church Cathedral, are both located in downtown Cincinnati.

In 2025, the diocese reported average Sunday attendance (ASA) of 4,721 persons, a decline from 6,605 in 2015. The most recent membership statistics (2025) showed 14,075 persons in 70 churches, a decrease from 19,619 in 2015.

== History ==
The Diocese of Southern Ohio was created from the Diocese of Ohio in 1875. The diocese's original cathedral, St. Paul Episcopal Cathedral, Cincinnati, was located in downtown Cincinnati but was demolished in 1937 due to structural problems. Thomas A. Jaggar became the first bishop in 1875. The see was vacant following the retirement of Thomas E. Breidenthal on November 29, 2020.

Bishop Wayne Smith of Missouri was elected as the Provisional Bishop on July 17, 2021.

The Right Rev. Kristen Uffelman White became the first female bishop of the Diocese of Southern Ohio on February 17, 2024.

== List of churches and religious communities ==
Cincinnati area parishes

- All Saints Episcopal Church, Pleasant Ridge
- Ascension & Holy Trinity, Wyoming
- Calvary Church, Clifton, Cincinnati
- Christ Church, Glendale
- Christ Church Cathedral, Downtown, Cincinnati
- Church of Our Saviour, Mount Auburn, Cincinnati
- Church of The Advent, East Walnut Hills, Cincinnati
- Church of The Ascension, Middletown
- Church of The Good Samaritan, Amelia
- Church of The Redeemer, Hyde Park, Cincinnati
- Grace Episcopal Church, College Hill
- Holy Trinity Episcopal Church, Kenwood
- Holy Trinity Episcopal Church, Oxford
- Indian Hill Episcopal Church, Indian Hill (joint Presbyterian parish)
- St. Andrew's Episcopal Church, Evanston, Cincinnati
- St. Anne's Episcopal Church, West Chester
- St. Barnabas Episcopal Church, Montgomery
- St. James Episcopal Church, Westwood, Cincinnati
- St. Patrick's Episcopal Church, Lebanon
- St. Simon of Cyrene Episcopal Church, Lincoln Heights
- St. Thomas Episcopal Church, Terrace Park
- St. Timothy's Episcopal Church, Anderson Township
- Trinity Episcopal Church, Hamilton

Columbus area parishes

- All Saints Episcopal Church, New Albany
- Church of St Edward, Whitehall
- St. Alban's Episcopal Church, Bexley
- St. Andrew's Episcopal Church, Pickerington
- St. James Episcopal Church, Clintonville
- St. John's Episcopal Church, Franklinton
- St. John's Episcopal Church, Lancaster
- St. John's Episcopal Church, Worthington
- St. Luke's Episcopal Church, Granville
- St. Mark's Episcopal Church, Upper Arlington
- St. Matthew's Episcopal Church, Westerville
- St. Patrick's Episcopal Church, Dublin
- St. Paul's Episcopal Church, Logan
- St. Peter's Episcopal Church, Delaware
- St. Philip's Episcopal Church, Columbus
- St. Stephen's Episcopal Church, Columbus
- Trinity Episcopal Church, Columbus
- Trinity Episcopal Church, London
- Trinity Episcopal Church, Newark

Dayton area parishes

- Christ Episcopal Church, Dayton
- Christ Episcopal Church, Springfield
- Christ Episcopal Church, Xenia
- Church of Our Savior, Mechanicsburg
- Church of The Epiphany, Urbana
- St. Christopher's Episcopal Church, Fairborn
- St. Francis Episcopal Church, Springboro
- St. George's Episcopal Church, Dayton
- St. James Episcopal Church, Piqua
- St. Margaret's Episcopal Church, Trotwood
- St. Mark's Episcopal Church, Dayton
- St. Mary's Episcopal Church, Waynesville
- St. Paul's Episcopal Church, Dayton
- St. Paul's Episcopal Church, Greenville
- Trinity Episcopal Church, Troy

Eastern area

- Church of The Epiphany, Nelsonville
- Church of The Good Shepherd, Athens
- Grace Episcopal Church, Pomeroy
- St. James Episcopal Church, Zanesville
- St. John's Episcopal Church, Cambridge
- St. Luke's Episcopal Church, Marietta
- St. Peter's Episcopal Church, Gallipolis
- Trinity Episcopal Church, McArthur

Central area

- All Saints Episcopal Church, Portsmouth
- Christ Episcopal Church, Ironton
- All Saints Lutheran/Episcopal Community, Washington Court House
- St. Mary's Episcopal Church, Hillsboro
- St. Paul's Episcopal Church, Chillicothe
- St. Philip's Episcopal Church, Circleville

Missions

- Community of the Transfiguration, Motherhouse, Glendale
- Procter Center

== List of bishops ==
The bishops of Southern Ohio have been:

Diocesan bishops

1. Thomas Augustus Jaggar, (1875–1904)
2. Boyd Vincent, (1904–1929)
3. Theodore I. Reese, (1929–1931)
4. Henry Wise Hobson, (1931–1959)
5. Roger Blanchard, (1959–1970)
6. John McGill Krumm, (1971–1980)
7. William Black, (1980–1992)
8. Herbert Thompson Jr., (1992–2005), deceased 2006
9. Thomas E. Breidenthal, (2007–2020)
10. Kristin Uffelman White, (2024-present)

Other bishops

- Boyd Vincent, coadjutor bishop (1889)
- Theodore I. Reese, coadjutor bishop (1913)
- Paul Jones, acting bishop (1929)
- Henry Wise Hobson, coadjutor bishop (1930)
- Roger W. Blanchard, coadjutor bishop (1958)
- William Black, coadjutor bishop (1979)
- Kenneth Lester Price Jr., suffragan bishop (1994-2012), interim bishop (2005-2007), assisting bishop (2015-present)
- Nedi Rivera, assisting bishop (2010–present)
- Wendell N. Gibbs, Jr., assisting bishop (2021 - present)
- Wayne Smith, bishop provisional (2021–2024)

== See also ==
- List of bishops of the Episcopal Church in the United States of America
