= Christ Church Cathedral (Cincinnati) =

Cathedral church of the Episcopal Diocese of Southern Ohio, US

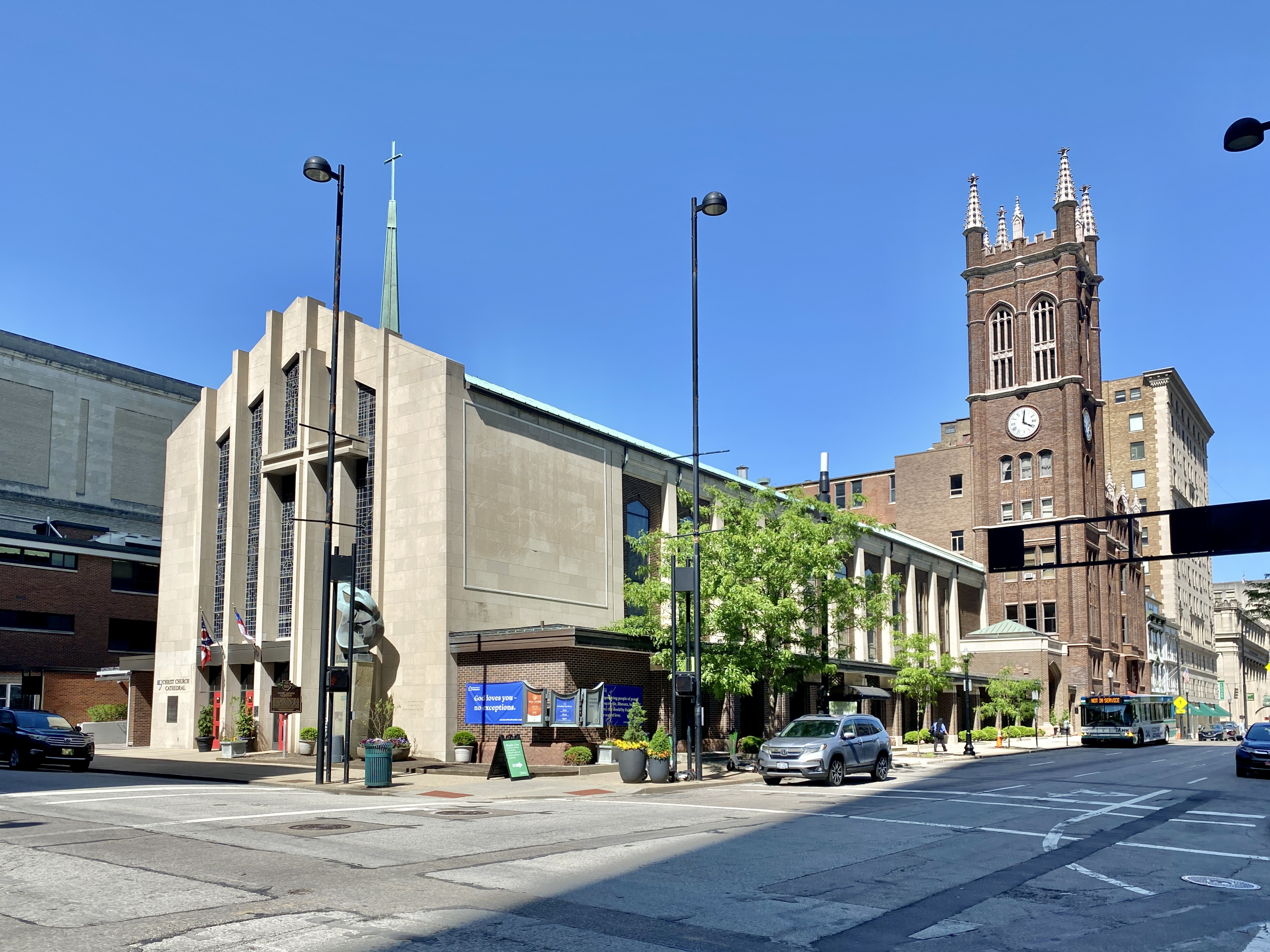

Religion
- Affiliation: Episcopal Church in the United States of America
- District: Episcopal Diocese of Southern Ohio
- Leadership: Rev. Owen C. Thompson
- Status: Active

Location
- Location: (United States) Cincinnati, Ohio, USA
- Interactive map of Christ Church Cathedral
- Coordinates: 39.100922°N 84.507448°W

Architecture
- Architect: David Briggs Maxfield
- Type: Cathedral
- Style: Parish House, Gothic Revival; Cathedral, Modern
- Completed: Parish House, 1907; Cathedral, 1957
- Materials: Brick

Website
- www.cincinnaticathedral.com

Christ Church Cathedral, Cincinnati, is the cathedral church of the Episcopal Diocese of Southern Ohio, United States.

== History ==
Christ Church was founded in 1817 by then missionary Rev. (future Bishop and Presiding Bishop) Philander Chase, and prominent early settlers of Cincinnati including William Henry Harrison (who became the ninth president of the United States) and Dr. Daniel Drake. In 1820, the church was formally incorporated in the State of Ohio; the first building was on East Sixth Street.

In 1835, the church moved to its present location at 318 East Fourth Street. The red-brick structure of 1835 was modeled after the old Stepney church St. Dunstan's in London.

The Gothic Revival-style Parish House was built in 1907, which today provides office space, rooms for classes and meetings, a gymnasium, the cathedral library and the cathedral shop.

The Centennial Chapel, located north of the present cathedral, was erected in 1917 to commemorate the church's centennial anniversary. It provides a setting for smaller worship services and concerts as well as a still space for individual prayer and meditation. It may have been designed by prominent Cincinnati architect Frederick W. Garber's firm.

The 1835 building, deemed unsafe, was replaced in 1957 with the current building, designed in a modern style by David Briggs Maxfield. Although it incorporates features such as the stained glass windows from the original church erected in 1835, the building is in contrast to the older buildings in the cathedral complex. It was remodeled in the 1980s and then again in the 1990s.

On Palm Sunday 1993, Christ Church was consecrated the cathedral of the Episcopal Diocese of Southern Ohio, succeeding the former St. Paul Episcopal Cathedral, Cincinnati. The following year, the largest renovation project in the history of Christ Church began, involving the church and the entire church complex, and the cathedral was rededicated in 1998.

== Christ Church Cathedral today ==
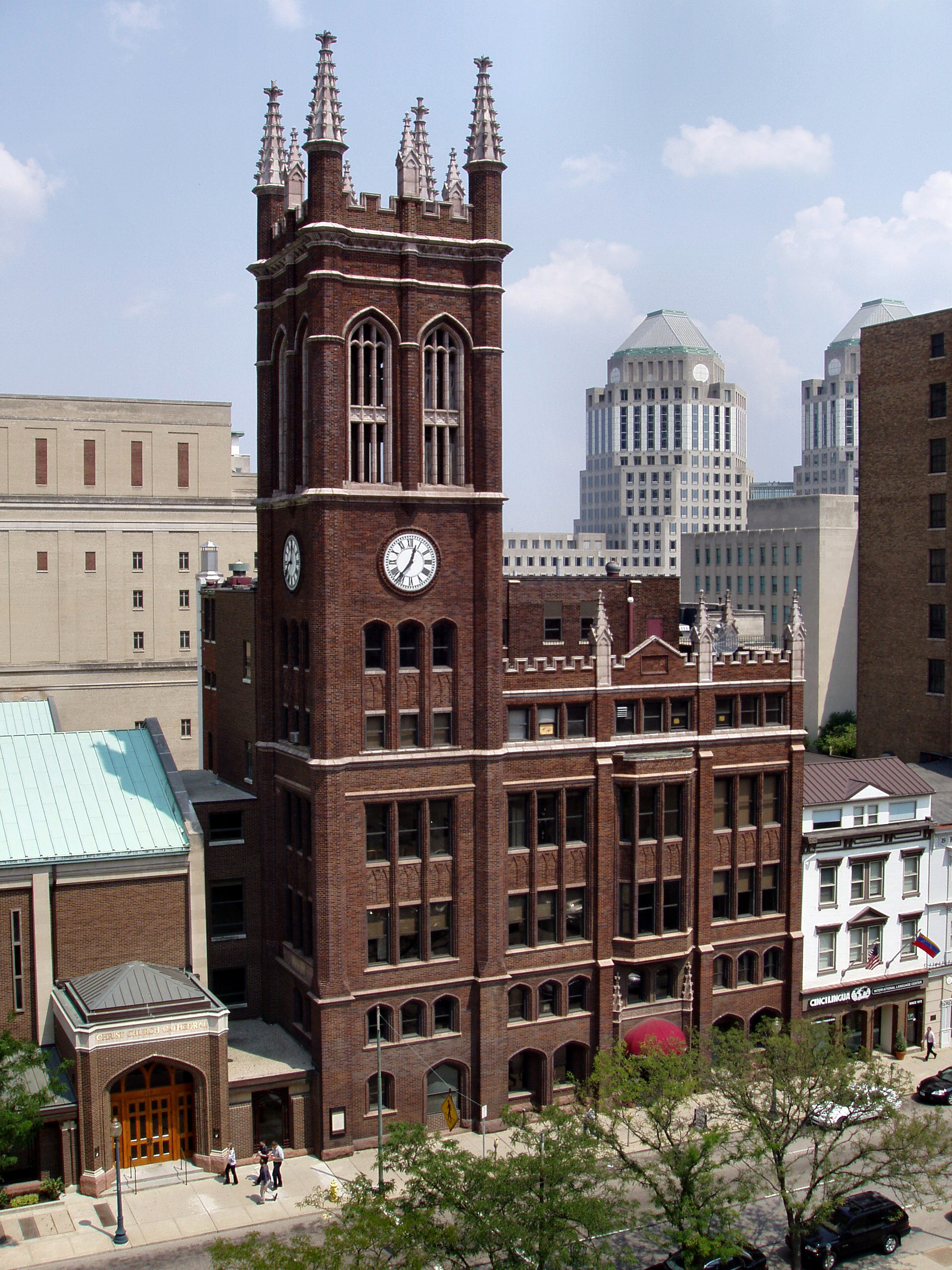
The Parish House with the nave partially visible to the left.

Christ Church continues its history of service to the community that extends back two centuries.

In 2021, the Very Reverend Owen C. Thompson became the first African American dean of the cathedral. Dean Thompson is the son of the Right Reverend Herbert Thompson Jr., who served as the diocesan bishop of the Episcopal Diocese of Southern Ohio from 1992 to 2005. That same year, a Richard, Fowkes & Co. Opus 24 organ was installed in the cathedral at the back of the cathedral's sanctuary.

== See also ==
- List of the Episcopal cathedrals of the United States
- List of cathedrals in the United States
