= Christ Church Cathedral (St. Louis, Missouri) =

- U.S. National Register of Historic Places
- U.S. National Historic Landmark
- St. Louis Landmark
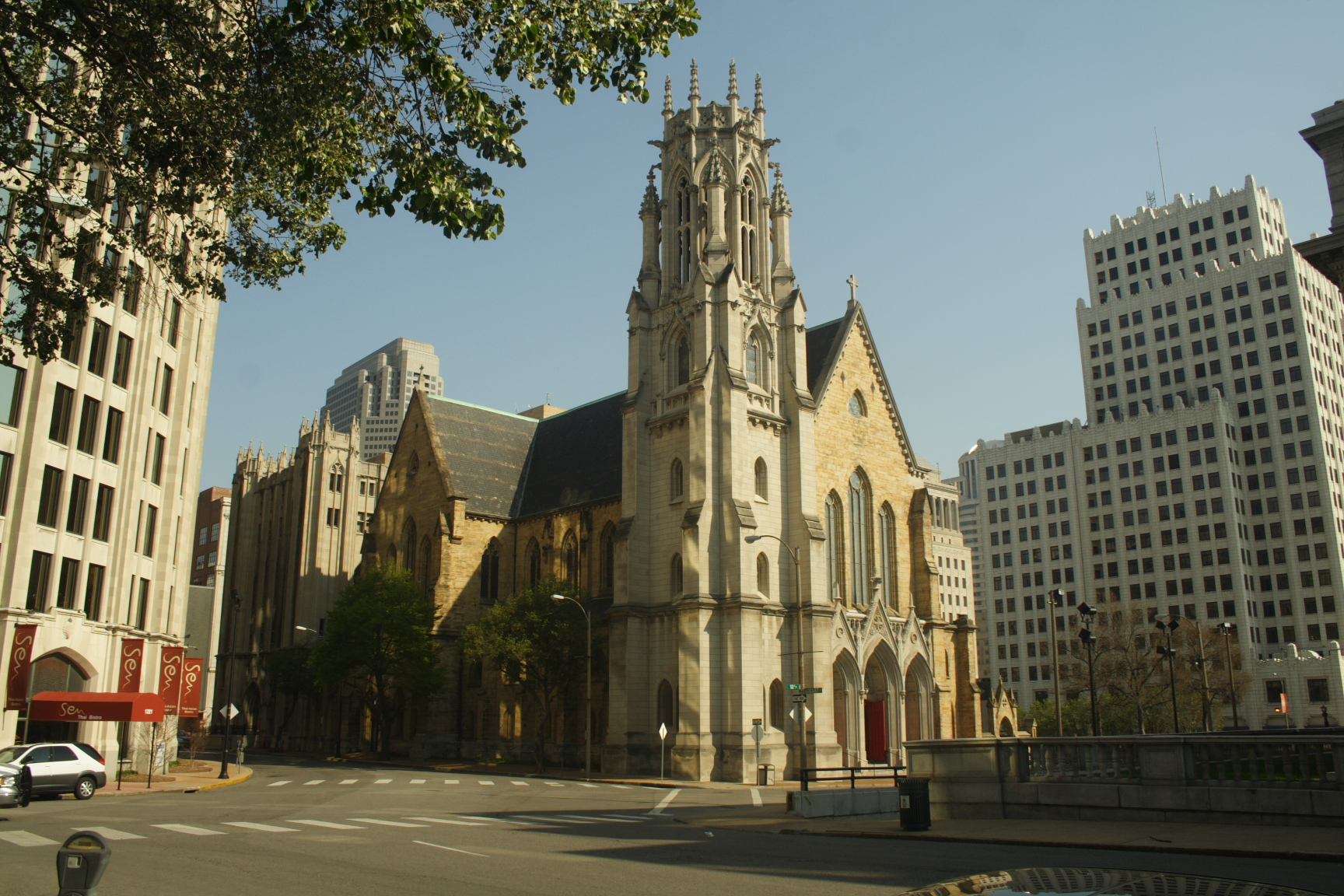
- Christ Church Cathedral

- Location within St. Louis Location within Missouri Location within the United States
- Location: 1210 Locust Street; St. Louis, Missouri
- Coordinates: 38°37′49″N 90°11′55″W
- Built: 1859
- Architect: Leopold Eidlitz; Legg, Jerome B.
- Architectural style: Late Gothic Revival, Greek Revival
- NRHP reference No.: 90000345

Significant dates
- Added to NRHP: March 7, 1990
- Designated NHL: October 12, 1994

Christ Church Cathedral is the Episcopal cathedral for the Diocese of Missouri. It is located at 1210 Locust Street in St. Louis, Missouri. The dean of the cathedral is the Very Reverend Kathie Adams-Shepherd. Adams-Shepherd is also the first female dean of this cathedral. Built during 1859–67, it is one of the few well-preserved surviving works of Leopold Eidlitz, a leading mid-19th-century American architect, and was designated a National Historic Landmark in 1994 for its architecture.

In 2015, the cathedral reported 632 members; in 2025, it reported 583 members. Plate and pledge financial support reported by the cathedral in 2025 was $420,621. Average Sunday Attendance (ASA) reported by the cathedral in 2025 was 178 persons.

== History and description ==
The cathedral was built between 1859 and 1867, and designed by architect Leopold Eidlitz. The Gothic Revival structure was an expression of the city's sense of its significance as the United States expanded westwards. It was one of the earliest churches influenced by the revival within the Episcopal Church of early Christian practices and styles, which later was influenced by the Oxford Movement originating in England. It was designated a National Historic Landmark in 1994.

The cathedral is located in what is now downtown St. Louis, at the southeast corner of Thirteenth and Locust streets. The main body of the church was built of Illinois sandstone, and its roof is of purple and green slate. It is basically a cruciform structure, with a tower projecting from the northern facade at the northwest corner. The base of the tower houses a baptistry, with a font of Italian marble.

A smaller sandstone chapel dates to 1893–95. From 1910 to 1912, a tower and porch were added of Indiana limestone. The chime of three steel bells, dedicated in 1912, were cast by the Bochumer Verein Foundry in 1904. The bourdon bell, weighing 5,732 pounds, is the largest bell in Missouri. The cathedral originally housed an organ from the Roosevelt Organ Company; in 1926 the Skinner Organ Company installed a new organ.

Montana silver magnate Charles D. McLure, a St. Louis native, was revealed to be the anonymous donor of $50,000 toward constructing the cathedral (approximately $6.5 million today).

== See also ==
- List of the Episcopal cathedrals of the United States
- List of cathedrals in the United States
- List of National Historic Landmarks in Missouri
- National Register of Historic Places listings in Downtown and Downtown West St. Louis
