= Nina Howell Starr =

American photographer, art historian and art dealer

- Born: Cornelia Margaret Howell; 1903; Newark, New Jersey, U.S.
- Died: May 14, 2000 (aged 96–97); Hamden, Connecticut, U.S.
- Education: Wellesley College, Barnard College, Bennington College, University of Florida
- Known for: Art history, photography, art dealer

Nina Howell Starr (1903–2000) was an American photographer, art historian, and art dealer. She is known for her influence in the career of artist Minnie Evans, and her photo-documentation of American roadside attractions and folk art culture.

== Early life and education ==
She was born Cornelia Margaret Howell in 1903 in Newark, New Jersey. Her parents were Edison Pioneer John White Howell and Frederica Burckle Gilchrist. Her sister was Jane Howell Lovejoy, former president of the Detroit Board of Education and a former governor of Wayne State University.

Starr briefly attended Wellesley College, and she graduated in 1926 from Barnard College. The summer after graduation, she married professor Nathan Comfort Starr (1896–1981), he specialized in Arthurian literature and Arthurian legends. Her sister-in-law was artist Ruth Starr Rose. Nathan and Nina had four children together, one son and three daughters. In the 1930s, she continued her studies and took architecture courses at Bennington College in Vermont.

The couple initially settled down in Cambridge, Massachusetts for her husband's academic career, but they later moved to Williamstown, Massachusetts; Annapolis, Maryland; Winter Park, Florida; Gainesville, Florida; New York City; and Hamden, Connecticut. In 1952–1953, Nathan Comfort Starr was a Fulbright Visiting Scholar at Kansai University in Osaka, Japan and Nina joined him in the travels.

In 1963, at the age of 60 she received her MFA degree in photography from the University of Florida, studying under Van Deren Coke and Jerry Uelsmann.

== Career ==
Starr was opinionated and advocated for modern design, racial equality, etiquette, the English language, folk art, women's rights, and photography, amongst other things. She would often write to newspapers to express her ideas. She became interested in photography at the age of 53.

In 1962, Starr had heard of self-taught artist Minnie Evans, and Starr visited Evan's place of work at the Airlie Gardens in North Carolina. Evans was working at the gardens when they met, and since 1948 Evans had displayed her artwork near her work station. Starr became Evan's representative and publicist for the next 25 years- she arranged and organized Evan's art exhibitions, taped interviews with the artist, she set Evan's art sales prices, and more. In the 1960s, Starr helped launch Evan's career with her first New York City art exhibition. Starr was instrumental in arranging a 1975 solo exhibition of Evan's drawings at the Whitney Museum of American Art, where Starr served as a guest curator, and she helped publish the related exhibition catalogue.

Starr's photography became known in the 1970s when she was in her 70s, while living in New York City.

== Death ==
She died on May 14, 2000, at the age of 97, in her home in Hamden, Connecticut.

== Publications ==
- Starr, Nina Howell (March 22, 1953). "Letters to the Times, Use of Films Abroad; Documentary Pictures to Portray American Scene Recommended". The New York Times. p. 162.
- Starr, Nina Howell (June 13, 1961). "Letters to the Times, Duty to Fight Segregation". The New York Times. p. 34.
- Starr, Nina Howell (Summer 1969). "The Lost World of Minnie Evans". The Bennington Review. 111 (2): 41.
- Starr, Nina Howell (September 1, 1969). "Letters". Newsweek.
- Starr, Nina Howell (1975). Minnie Evans (exhibition catalogue). Whitney Museum of American Art.
- Starr, Nina Howell (Winter 1994). "Minne Evans and Me". Folk Art. 19 (4): 52–60 – via issuu.

== See also ==
- Women in the art history field
