= Minnie Evans =

African American female painter (1892–1987)

- Born: Minnie Eva Jones; December 12, 1892; Long Creek, North Carolina, U.S.
- Died: December 16, 1987 (aged 95); Wilmington, North Carolina, U.S.
- Occupation: Artist

Minnie Eva Evans (December 12, 1892 – December 16, 1987) was an African-American artist who worked in the United States from the 1940s to the 1980s. Evans used different types of media in her work such as oils and graphite, but started with using wax and crayon. She was inspired to start drawing due to visions and dreams that she had all throughout her life, starting when she was a young girl. She is known as a southern folk artist and outsider artist, as well as a surrealist and visionary artist.

== Personal life ==
Evans (born Minnie Eva Jones) was born to Ella Jones on December 12, 1892 in Long Creek, North Carolina. Ella was only 13 years old at the time. Evans' biological father, George Moore, left after she was born. When Evans was two months old, she and her mother moved to Wilmington, North Carolina, to live with her maternal grandmother, Mary Croom Jones in 1893. Evans, like other children her age, had an active imagination at all hours of the day. In her case, the whimsical visions she received would keep her up throughout the night, so that she hardly ever got any rest. This lack of sleep, together with her family's need for her assistance, caused her schooling to end at the age of 13. Minnie attended school until the sixth grade and in 1903, she, Ella, and Mary Croom Jones moved to Wrightsville Sound, a town close to Wilmington. Minnie attended St. Matthew African Methodist Episcopal Church in Wrightsville Beach, North Carolina.

In Wrightsville, Ella Jones met her future husband, Joe Kelly, and they married in 1908. During this time, Jones worked as a "sounder" selling shellfish door to door. In 1908, one of Joe Kelly's daughter's from a previous marriage introduced Minnie Jones to Julius Caesar Evans. Minnie Jones, who was 16 years old at the time, married Julius (aged 19) that same year. They got married illegally and Minnie Evans lied about age. The couple had three sons, Elisha Dyer, David Barnes Evans, and George Sheldon Evans. Though Evans had many supporters, her husband was not one of them. He would often tell her to stop making up visions and to focus on things to maintain the household. He believed her to be going crazy from the art she was creating.

Beginning in 1916, Minnie Evans was employed as a domestic worker at the home of her husband's employer, Pembroke Jones, a wealthy industrialist. The Evans family lived on Jones's hunting estate, "Pembroke Park", known today as the subdivision Landfall. Pembroke Jones died in 1919 and his wife, Sarah (Sadie) Jones remarried Henry Walters. Evans continued to work for Sadie Jones and now Henry Walters, on the Airlie Estate. Sadie Jones turned the Airlie Estate into gardens in the early 1900s and it later became one of the most famous gardens of the south. After Sadie Jones died, a man named Albert Corbet bought the property in 1948 and assigned Evans to be the gatekeeper and take admission from public visitors. She held this position for the rest of her life. She retired from her job as the gatekeeper when she was 82 years old in 1974.

== Career ==
Evans began drawing on Good Friday 1935, when she finished two drawings using pen and ink "dominated by concentric and semi-circles against a background of unidentifiable linear motifs". These two pieces were titled "My Very First" and "My Second", respectively. From a young age, Minnie depicts her experiences of receiving visions and viewing mythical creatures that acquaintances could not. Inevitably, these visions circulated throughout her life as she started to hear and see more into her early adulthood. She heard a voice in her head that said: "Why don't you draw or die?" After this, Evans did not resume drawing until 1940. She started using pencil and wax on paper for her beginning works and she later worked with oil paints and mixed media collages. Her subject matter were usually either biblical scenes or scenes from nature. Often, it was a mixture of both. Her influences included African, Caribbean, East India, Chinese, and Western cultures. Since she held the position as gatekeeper at the Airlie Gardens, she often used the gardens as her inspiration in her work to depict nature scenes. When not taking tickets, Evans was always off painting another vision inspired by her floral surroundings.

Evans first started selling her work at the Airlie Gardens by hanging her pieces on the front gate of the gardens. She would often give her pieces away to visitors. Soon she became known throughout the south and visitors would come to the gardens just to see her work. In 1961, she had her first formal exhibition of drawings and oils at the Little Artists Gallery (now St. Johns Museum) in Wilmington, North Carolina.

In 1962, Evans met photographer, folk art specialist, and art historian, Nina Howell Starr. Starr, an artist herself (photographer), knew of Evans' work in 1961 and wanted to meet the artist in person. Starr would go on to represent Evans and publicized her work for the next 25 years. Evans originally sold her first paintings for 50 cents a piece. Starr encouraged Evans to sell her paintings for better prices and assisted Evans throughout her career. Evans felt her work was too personal to share with the public which held her from releasing anything until 1961 when she had her first major art exhibition at The Little Gallery in Wilmington, now known as St. John's Museum.

From 1962 until 1973, Starr recorded interviews with Evans about her work. At first, Evans was wary to trust Starr with her work, but they gained a mutual respect for each other. Starr helped to launch Evans' career by storing and selling her art in New York City. She also guided her in the art world by making her sign and date her pieces. In 1966, Starr arranged for Evans' first New York exhibit at the Church of Epiphany and Clements Episcopal Church. In August 1969, another exhibition of Evans' work took place at the Art Image Gallery of New York and in 1975, curated a major Evans exhibition at the Whitney Museum of American Art. With failing health, another exhibition of her work was curated in 1980 at the St. John's Museum. She also had many other exhibitions in New York as well.

Many art critics have labelled Evans work as "surrealistic", "visionary", and "psychedelic". Religion played a vital role in Evans life, as well as in many of Evans paintings. Evans confessed she wasn't sure of the meanings behind her paintings, stating: "When I get through with them I have to look at them like everybody else. They are just as strange to me as they are to anybody else."

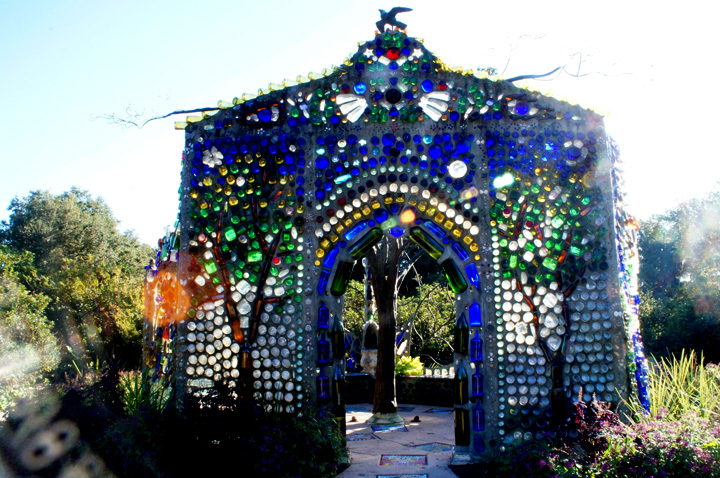
Minnie Evans Bottle Chapel designed and built by Virginia Wright-Frierson

Evans created "one of the most powerful works of art", which was a self-portrait on the cover of a scrapbook in 1981.

Evans died in Wilmington, North Carolina, on December 16, 1987, at the age of 95, leaving more than 400 artworks to the St. Johns Museum of Art (now the Cameron Art Museum) in Wilmington. After Evans' death, artist Virginia Wright-Frierson designed and built the Minnie Evans Bottle Chapel at Airlie Gardens in her memory. Made almost entirely from reused glass bottles, the Bottle Chapel was created as a tribute to folk artist Minnie Evans and featured works from many other artists. When looking at a top view of the chapel, it resembles a flower with a leaf on each side. Along the path, colored cement has pressed flowers and plants that Evans used in her paintings. Children’s art that Evans inspired was transformed into 95 stepping stones, each for a year of her life. The chapel itself contains stained glass with many faces and figures that resemble one's Evans used. "Minnie Evans Day" was proclaimed on May 14, 1994, in Greenville, North Carolina.

Evans was the subject of the documentary The Angel that Stands By Me: Minnie Evans' Art (1983), by Allie Light and Irving Saraf. The title of the documentary comes from a quote by Evans herself, in which she says: "God has sent me an angel that stands by me. [It] stands with me and directs me what to do."

In 2025 Evans was the subject of a Museum of Fine Arts Boston exhibition “The Visionary Art of Minnie Evans,” as well as an exhibition at the High Museum of Art, “The Lost World: The Art of Minnie Evans.” Evans is also the subject of Minnie Evans: Draw or Die, a documentary by filmmaker Linda Royal.

== Famous works ==
=== Inspiration, style, and technique ===
Evans began to draw and paint at the age of 43, creating her first pieces of artwork on a scrap of paper bag. She was known to free-hand her drawings from left to right. Minnie Evans was notorious for drawing with anything on hand, including discarded window shades, book bindings, scrap paper. She also favored the use of Crayola crayons as she said “they are the best.” Five years later she decided to really dedicate herself to recording her dreams through art. Filled with Edens and heavens, the landscape of her dream world is principally free of the threat of hell. She painted her early works on US Coast guard stationery and later worked with more precision, using ink, graphite, wax crayon, watercolor and oil on canvas, board and paper.

Evans drawings were inspired by her dreams and filled with many colors inspired by her work at Airlie Gardens. Minnie Evans was raised as a Christian. She had this recurring dream that Abraham Prophets were carrying and throwing her around to a Cemetery in Wilmington where union soldiers who fought in the Civil War were buried. Her designs are complex, with elements recalling the art of China and the Caribbean combined with more Western themes. The central motif in many pieces is a human face surrounded by plant and animal forms. The eyes, which Evans equated with God's omniscience, are central to each figure, often three eyes were depicted and frontal faces with concealed lips. Symmetry was also a common theme in Evans' work In addition, God is sometimes depicted with wings and a multicolored collar and halo and shown surrounded by all manner of creatures.

Her drawing became compulsive, and her friends and family became worried that she was losing her mind. Over time, however, they gained respect for her art and believed she had a gift. A friend of hers said: "I really feel like Minnie has powers that not many of us have. I'm sure she has."

=== Works ===
Her first works, titled My Very First and My Second, are ink on paper. The entire surface is filled with abstract designs and shapes with nature images and themes in both. These works are not in color. After handing her these drawings to a mysterious prophet, Evans was told that they foreshadowed the current global conflict, World War II. Madame Tula later instructed Evans to make a new painting featuring the war's conclusion. Days later, Evans painted Invasion Picture, capturing total destruction, bombs, and a figure of Fu Manchu.

Another work titled "Design: Airlie Garden" depicts flowers, plants, and butterflies. The nature theme is shown here, but this piece is somewhat atypical due to the asymmetry of the painting.

Two other works, both untitled are more typical works by Evans. One, dated 1996, depicts a woman with a feathered headdress and a green bird. This piece has bold colors, symmetrical, and includes nature themes. The media used is graphite, ink, tempera, and wax crayon on paper. The other is a female portrait including the theme of eyes, bold colors, and nature designs as well. The media used are gouache, ink, and wax crayon on paper.

Her work is highly collected by many museums and collectors all across the world. Many of her works can be viewed at the Museum of Modern Art, the Smithsonian Institution, the Abby Aldrich Rockefeller Folk Art Museum, the American Folk Art Museum, the Whitney Museum of American Art, the Pérez Art Museum Miami, the Ogden Museum of Southern Art, and the High Museum of Art.

A review of a 2017 exhibit notes the contrast between Evans' later works -- "increasingly sophisticated" faces and greater "familiarity with nature"—with her first drawings between 1935 and 1940, which "indicate her innate genius and awareness, in the raw and in transition."

== Exhibitions ==
=== MoMa Exhibitions ===
- 1997 "A decade collecting: Selected recent acquisitions in Modern Drawing " MoMa
- 1999 "Sight Gags: Grotesque Caricature and modern wit in modern and contemporary drawings" MoMa
- 2000 "Making choices" MoMa
- 2008 "Glossolaila: Languages of drawing" MoMa
- 2008 "Wunderkrammer: A century of curiosities" MoMa
- 2016-2017 "From the collection: 1960-1969" MoMa
- 2019-2023 "521: Masters of Popular Painting" MoMa
- 2023-2024 "Artists choice: Grace Wales Bonner- Spirit Movers" MoMa
- 2024-2025 "Vital Signs: Artists and the Body" MoMa
- (2026-current) 407: Sign Posts MoMa

== Publications ==
Art exhibition catalogues, in ascending order by date:

- Starr, Nina Howell (1975). Minnie Evans (exhibition catalogue). Whitney Museum of American Art.
- Kahan, Mitchell (1986). Heavenly Visions: the Art of Minnie Evans, January 18 - April 13, 1986, North Carolina Museum of Art (exhibition catalogue). Raleigh, North Carolina: North Carolina Museum of Art. ISBN 9780882599519.
- Black Folk Artists: Minnie Evans & Bill Traylor - African American Museum, Hempstead, New York, 10 June - 10 September 1989. African American Museum, Hempstead, New York. 1989.
- Lovell, Charles M; Hester, Erwin (1993). Minnie Evans: Artist (exhibition catalogue). Greenville, North Carolina: Wellington B. Gray Gallery, East Carolina University. ISBN 978-0963675903.
