= Hunley Elebash =

American bishop

The Right Reverend Hunley Elebash D.D.
- Bishop of East Carolina
- Church: Episcopal Church
- Diocese: East Carolina
- In office: 1973–1983
- Predecessor: Tom Wright
- Successor: Sidney Sanders
- Previous post: Coadjutor Bishop of East Carolina (1968-1973)

Orders
- Ordination: March 15, 1951 by Frank Juhan
- Consecration: October 2, 1968 by John E. Hines

Personal details
- Born: July 23, 1923 Pensacola, Florida, United States
- Died: October 20, 1993 (aged 70) Wilmington, North Carolina, United States
- Buried: Oakdale Cemetery (Wilmington, North Carolina)
- Denomination: Anglican
- Parents: Eugene Perrin Elebash, Ann Hunley Agee
- Spouse: Maurine Ashton
- Children: 2
- Education: Sewanee: The University of the South

Hunley Agee Elebash (July 23, 1923 – October 20, 1993) was bishop of the Episcopal Diocese of East Carolina from 1973 to 1983.

== Early life and education ==
Elebash was born on July 23, 1923, in Pensacola, Florida, the son of Eugene Perrin Elebash (1893-1946) and Ann Hunley Agee (1894-1958). He was educated at Pensacola High School. He later studied at Sewanee: The University of the South and graduated with a Bachelor of Science in 1944. He married Maurine Ashton on November 2, 1946, and together they had a son and a daughter. In 1950 he received a Bachelor of Divinity from the University of the South.

== Ordained ministry ==
Elebash was ordained deacon on June 23, 1950, and priest on March 15, 1951, by Bishop Frank Juhan of Florida at St John's Cathedral, Jacksonville, Florida. He served as assistant priest at St Mark's Church in Jacksonville, Florida from 1950 to 1953 before becoming rector of St Catherine's Church in Jacksonville, Florida, in 1953. On January 15, 1957 he was made rector of St John's Church in Wilmington, North Carolina. In 1964 he left St John's and became the executive secretary of the Diocese of East Carolina.

== Bishop ==
In 1968, Elebash was elected Coadjutor Bishop of East Carolina and was consecrated on October 2, 1968, at St James' Church in Wilmington, North Carolina, with Presiding Bishop John E. Hines as chief consecrator. He succeeded as diocesan bishop in 1973 and retired in August 1983.
