= Alfred Watson =

Alfred Watson may refer to:

- Alfred Watson (actuary) (1870–1936), British government actuary
- Alf Watson (1907–1992), Australian athlete
- Alfred A. Watson (1818–1905), Episcopal bishop of East Carolina, United States
- Alfred Michael Watson (1908–1990), Roman Catholic bishop of Erie, United States
- Alfred Watson (cricketer) (1888–1957), Tasmanian cricket captain in 1927/28
- Alf Watson (rugby league), 1930s British rugby league footballer
- Rat Watson (1894–1965), American football player
