= Thomas C. Darst =

American bishop

The Right Reverend Thomas Campbell Darst D.D.
- Bishop of East Carolina
- Church: Episcopal Church
- Diocese: East Carolina
- Elected: October 7, 1914
- In office: 1915–1945
- Predecessor: Robert Strange
- Successor: Tom Wright

Orders
- Ordination: June 1903 by William Loyall Gravatt
- Consecration: January 6, 1915 by Daniel S. Tuttle

Personal details
- Born: November 10, 1875 Pulaski, Virginia, United States
- Died: September 1, 1948 (aged 72) Wilmington, North Carolina, United States
- Buried: Oakdale Cemetery
- Denomination: Anglican (prev. Presbyterian)
- Parents: Thomas Welch Darst & Margaret Rebecca Glendy
- Spouse: Florence Newton Wise (m. 1902, d.1914); Fannie Lauriston Hardin (m. 1916)
- Children: 4
- Education: Roanoke College

Thomas Campbell Darst (November 10, 1875 – September 1, 1948) was the third Bishop of the Episcopal Diocese of East Carolina from 1915 to 1945.

== Early life and education ==
Darst was born on November 10, 1875, in Pulaski, Virginia, the son of Major Thomas Welch Darst and Margaret Rebecca Glendy. He was raised as a Presbyterian. He was educated in public schools in Pulaski and later in Salem. He graduated from Roanoke College in 1899. He then also joined the Episcopal Church. He also enrolled at the Virginia Theological Seminary where he trained for the priesthood and graduated in 1902. On November 5, 1902, he married Florence Newton Wise. After her death in 1914, he married Fannie Lauriston Hardin on April 26, 1916. He had sons from the first marriage and a daughter from the second. He was awarded a Doctor of Divinity from the Virginia Seminary in 1914, University of the South in 1915, University of North Carolina in 1927 and Duke University in 1934.

== Ordained ministry ==
Darst was made deacon in June 1902 by Bishop George William Peterkin of West Virginia and ordained priest in June 1903 by William Loyall Gravatt, Coadjutor Bishop of Virginia. Between 1902 and 1903, he served as assistant at Christ Church in Fairmont, West Virginia, while between 1903 and 1905 he was rector of Trinity Church in Upperville, Virginia, Emmanuel Church in Middleburg, Virginia and Redeemer Church in Aldie, Virginia. In 1905 he became rector of St Mark's Church in Richmond, Virginia, while in 1909 he transferred to Newport News, Virginia to become rector of St Paul's Church. Between 1914 and 1915 he served as rector of St James' Church in Richmond, Virginia.

== Bishop ==
Darst was elected Bishop of East Carolina on October 7, 1914, and consecrated on January 6, 1915, in St James' Church, Wilmington, North Carolina with Presiding Bishop Daniel S. Tuttle as chief consecrator. He retired on May 1, 1945, and was succeeded by Tom Wright (Bishop of East Carolina). He died on September 1, 1948, at the James Walker Memorial Hospital in Wilmington, North Carolina after suffering a heart attack. His funeral was held at St James' Wilmington and buried at the Oakdale Cemetery.
