= Clifton Daniel (bishop) =

American bishop

The Right Reverend Clifton Daniel D.D.
- Dean of the Cathedral of St John the Divine
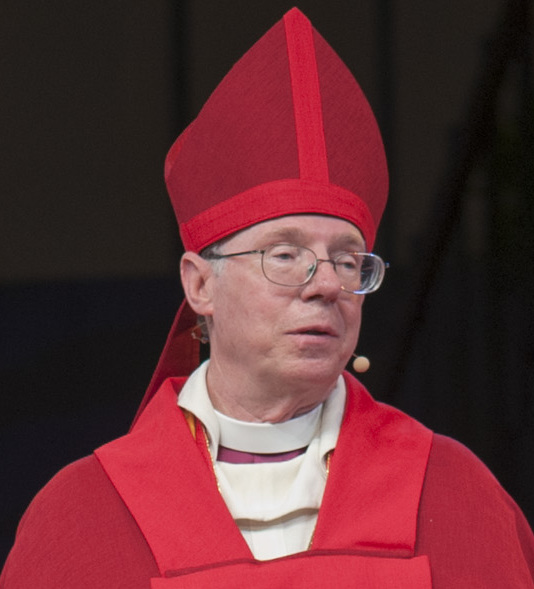
- Bishop Daniel in 2012
- Church: Episcopal Church
- Diocese: New York
- Elected: June 10, 2018
- In office: 2018–2022
- Predecessor: James A. Kowalski
- Previous posts: Coadjutor Bishop of East Carolina (1996–1997); Bishop of East Carolina (1997–2013)

Orders
- Ordination: April 1973 by Hunley Elebash
- Consecration: September 21, 1996 by Edmond L. Browning

Personal details
- Born: July 4, 1947 (age 79) Goldsboro, North Carolina, United States
- Denomination: Anglican
- Spouse: Anne Miller
- Children: 3

Clifton Daniel, 3rd (or III; called Dan; born July 4, 1947) is a bishop in the Episcopal Church. He served as the dean of the Cathedral of St. John the Divine from 2018 to 2022.

Ordination history of Clifton Daniel
History
Episcopal consecration
- Principal consecrator: Edmond L. Browning
- Co-consecrators: Sidney Sanders; Charles Vaché; George Nelson Hunt III
- Date: September 21, 1996
- Place: Williams Arena at Minges Coliseum
Episcopal succession
Bishops consecrated by Clifton Daniel as principal consecrator
- John C. Bauerschmidt: 2007
- Dabney Tyler Smith: 2007
- Mark Lawrence: 2008
- Gregory Brewer: 2012

== Early life and education ==
Daniel was born on July 4, 1947 in Goldsboro, North Carolina, United States. He attended the University of North Carolina at Chapel Hill and graduated in 1969 with a Bachelor of Arts in Spanish education. He earned his Master of Divinity from Virginia Theological Seminary in Alexandria, Virginia. He received honorary Doctor of Divinity degrees from both Virginia Theological Seminary in 1997 and the University of the South in Sewanee, Tennessee in 1998.

== Ordained ministry ==
Daniel was ordained to the diaconate in June 1972, and then to the priesthood in April 1973. In 1996 he was elected and consecrated bishop coadjutor of the Episcopal Diocese of East Carolina. With the death of B. Sidney Sanders, he became the diocesan bishop on June 5, 1997. He served the diocese until 2013, when he became provisional bishop of the Episcopal Diocese of Pennsylvania. After the consecration of Daniel Gutierrez in 2016, Daniel was first named interim dean–then on June 20, 2018 appointed 10th Dean–of the Cathedral of St. John the Divine in New York City. He resigned as dean on June 30, 2022.

== Personal life ==
He married Anne William Miller with whom he had three daughters. His wife died in 2017.

== Sources ==
- Episcopal Diocese of East Carolina website

Episcopal Church (USA) titles
Preceded by B. Sidney Sanders	Bishop of East Carolina; 1997-2013	Succeeded by Robert Skirving
Preceded by Charles Bennison	16th Bishop of Pennsylvania; 2013-2016	Succeeded by Daniel G. P. Gutierrez
