= General McRae =

General McRae may refer to:

- Alexander Duncan McRae (1874–1946), Canadian Army major general
- Dandridge McRae (1829–1899), Confederate States Army brigadier general
- James McRae (United States Army officer) (1862–1940), U.S. Army major general
- William MacRae (1834–1882), Confederate States Army brigadier general
