= Robert Skirving =

American Episcopal bishop

The Right Reverend Robert Skirving
- Bishop Emeritus of East Carolina
- Church: Episcopal Church
- Diocese: East Carolina
- Elected: May 17, 2014
- In office: 2014–2026
- Predecessor: Clifton Daniel
- Successor: Sarah Fisher

Orders
- Ordination: December 17, 1986 by Derwyn Jones
- Consecration: November 8, 2014 by Katharine Jefferts Schori

Personal details
- Born: August 26, 1960 (age 65) Windsor, Ontario, Canada
- Denomination: Anglican
- Spouse: Sandy Skirving
- Children: 2

Robert Stuart Skirving was the eighth bishop of the Episcopal Diocese of East Carolina. He was elected on May 17, 2014 and consecrated on November 8, 2014. As a part of his ministry in the wider Episcopal Church, Bishop Skirving also served as the Chancellor of Sewanee: The University of the South.

== Biography ==
Skirving was born on August 28, 1960, in Windsor, Ontario, Canada. He studied at the University of Waterloo in Ontario and graduated with a Bachelor of Arts in philosophy in 1982. He then earned a Master of Divinity from Huron University College in London, Ontario in 1986.

He was ordained deacon on May 1, 1986, in St Paul's Cathedral, London, Ontario, and then a priest on December 17, 1986, in St James' Westminster Church in London, Ontario by Derwyn Dixon Jones, the Bishop of Huron. He then became assistant curate at the Church of St John the Evangelist in London, Ontario. Between 1988 and 1991, he became rector of Advent Church, Redeemer Church, and Trinity Church in Ridgetown. In 1992, he became rector of St Mark's Church in Brantford, Ontario. In 1998, he graduated with a Doctor of Ministry from Seabury-Western Theological Seminary. From 1999 till 2004, he served as rector of Bishop Cronyn Memorial Church in London, Ontario, while in 2005, he became rector of St John's Church in Midland, Michigan, after being received into the Episcopal Church by the Bishop of Eastern Michigan Edwin M. Leidel Jr.

== Bishop ==
On May 17, 2014 Skirving, was elected the eighth bishop of the Episcopal Diocese of East Carolina during a reconvened session of the 131st Diocesan Convention of the Diocese of East Carolina, held at Christ Church in New Bern, North Carolina. Six months following his election, on November 8, 2014, Skirving was consecrated bishop at the Rock Springs Center in Greenville, North Carolina, with Presiding Bishop Katharine Jefferts Schori as chief consecrator. On October 12, 2018, the Board of Trustees of the University of the South elected Skirving to serve as the 25th Chancellor of the University. In a letter to the Board of Trustees on November 18, 2022, Skirving announced his intent to step down as chancellor as soon as his successor had been elected. On December 29, 2022, the Rt. Rev. Dr. Jacob Owensby, bishop of the Episcopal Diocese of Western Louisiana, was elected the 26th chancellor of the University of the South, succeeding Skirving. On November 16, 2024 Skirving called for the election of his successor stating that by his intended step-down date, 2026, he will have served in ordained ministry for 40 years and "will be ready to retire." On November 15, 2025, at the 142nd Diocesan Convention held at the Maxwell Agricultural Convention Center in Goldsboro, North Carolina, the Rev. Sarah Fisher, at the time, rector of St. Catherine’s Episcopal Church in Marietta, Georgia, was elected to be the next bishop of the diocese after three ballots. Fisher's ordination and consecration as the ninth Bishop of the Episcopal Diocese of East Carolina was held at the Riverfront Convention Center in New Bern on May 23, 2026,. Skirving retired after Fisher's consecration after 11 years in the office of the bishop.

== See also ==
- List of Episcopal bishops of the United States
- Historical list of the Episcopal bishops of the United States
