= Sarah Fisher (bishop) =

American bishop

Sarah Kathleen Fisher is an American Episcopal bishop currently serving as the 9th Bishop of East Carolina.

== Education ==
Fisher was awarded a Bachelor of Arts degree in psychology from Agnes Scott College in Decatur, Georgia, in 1993 and a Master of Divinity degree from General Theological Seminary in New York City in 2005.

== Career ==
Fisher's ordination as a deacon in 2004 and as a priest in 2005 both took place in Georgia. She served in the Diocese of Chicago as curate of St. Paul the Redeemer church from 2005 to 2007 and as rector of St. Peter's church from 2007 to 2012 before returning to the Diocese of Georgia. After working briefly as a hospital chaplain and interim rector, she became associate rector of St. Patrick's Church in Dunwoody in 2014 and rector of St. Catherine's Church in Marietta in 2017.

On November 15, 2025, Fisher was elected to serve as the ninth Bishop of East Carolina, succeeding Robert Skirving. Her consecration took place at the Riverfront Convention Center in New Bern, North Carolina, on May 23, 2026, in the presence of the Presiding Bishop of the Episcopal Church of America, Sean Rowe.

== Personal life ==
Fisher is married to the Rev. Mandy Brady, who is also an Episcopal priest.
