= Tom Wright (bishop of East Carolina) =

Episcopal bishop (1904–1997)

The Right Reverend Thomas Henry Wright D.D.
- Bishop of East Carolina
- Church: Episcopal Church
- Diocese: East Carolina
- Elected: May 24, 1945
- In office: 1945–1973
- Predecessor: Thomas C. Darst
- Successor: Hunley A. Elebash

Orders
- Ordination: 1930
- Consecration: October 5, 1945 by Henry St. George Tucker

Personal details
- Born: October 16, 1904 Wilmington, North Carolina, United States
- Died: April 26, 1997 (aged 92) Porters Neck, North Carolina, United States
- Denomination: Anglican
- Parents: John Maffitt Wright, Josie Young Whitaker
- Spouse: Hannah Hagans Knowlton
- Children: 4
- Education: Sewanee: The University of the South

Thomas Henry Wright (October 16, 1904 – April 26, 1997) was fourth bishop of the Episcopal Diocese of East Carolina from 1945 till 1973.

== Early life and education ==
Wright was born on October 16, 1904, in Wilmington, North Carolina, the son of John Maffitt Wright (1869-1906) and Josephine "Josie" Young Whitaker (1866-1940). He graduated with a Bachelor of Arts from Sewanee: The University of the South in 1926. He then worked as a clerk with the Standard Oil Corporation of New Jersey between 1926 and 1927. Later, he studied at the Virginia Theological Seminary and graduated with a Bachelor of Divinity in 1930. On December 1, 1937, he married Hannah Hagans Knowlton and together had four children. He was awarded several honorary degrees of Doctor of Divinity: from the University of South in 1946, the Virginia Theological Seminary in 1946, Washington and Lee University in 1940 and the University of North Carolina in 1965.

== Ordained ministry ==
Wright was ordained to the diaconate in 1929 and to the priesthood in 1930. He was in charge of Trinity Church in Lumberton, North Carolina, between 1929 and 1930, and later assistant at the Chapel of the Cross in Chapel Hill, North Carolina, from 1931 to 1932. Subsequently, he was also chaplain at the University of North Carolina, until becoming national acting secretary of college work of the Episcopal Church in 1933. In 1934, he became chaplain at the Virginia Military Institute and subsequently chaplain at Washington and Lee University and rector of Robert E. Lee Memorial Church in Lexington, Virginia, three posts he retained till 1941. He became Dean of Grace Cathedral in San Francisco in 1941, until resigning to accept the post of rector of St Mark's Church in San Antonio, Texas, in 1943.

== Bishop ==
Wright was elected bishop on May 24, 1945, and consecrated on October 5, 1945, at St James' Church in Wilmington, North Carolina, with Presiding Bishop Henry St. George Tucker as chief consecrator. He retired on December 31, 1973.
