= Robert Strange (bishop) =

American bishop

The Right Reverend Robert Strange D.D.
- Bishop of East Carolina
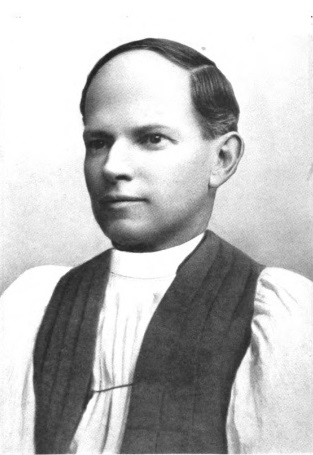
- Church: Episcopal Church
- Diocese: East Carolina
- Elected: May 26, 1904
- In office: 1905–1914
- Predecessor: Alfred A. Watson
- Successor: Thomas C. Darst
- Previous post: Coadjutor Bishop of East Carolina (1904-1905)

Orders
- Ordination: November 15, 1885 by Theodore B. Lyman
- Consecration: November 1, 1904 by Ellison Capers

Personal details
- Born: December 6, 1857 Wilmington, North Carolina, United States
- Died: August 23, 1914 (aged 56) Wilmington, North Carolina, United States
- Buried: St James's Church, Wilmington, North Carolina
- Denomination: Anglican
- Parents: Robert Strange & Caroline Wright
- Spouse: Elizabeth Stone Buford (m. September 29, 1886)
- Children: 2
- Education: University of North Carolina

Robert Strange (December 6, 1857 – August 23, 1914) was second bishop of the Episcopal Diocese of East Carolina, serving from 1905 to 1913.

== Early life and education ==
Strange was born in Wilmington, North Carolina on December 6, 1857, the son of Robert Strange, a lawyer and army officer, and Caroline Wright. He was also the grandson of Judge and Senator Robert Strange. He was baptized in St James's Church in Wilmington, North Carolina. He studied at the Horner School and the University of North Carolina, graduating with a Bachelor of Arts in 1879 and also receiving the debater's medal. He then studied at Berkeley Divinity School and graduated in 1883.

== Ordained ministry ==
In April 1884, he was ordained deacon by Bishop Alfred A. Watson, of East Carolina and priest on November 15, 1885 by Bishop Theodore B. Lyman of North Carolina. He served as a missionary at Lawrenceville, Virginia between 1884 and 1885. He then became rector of the Church of the Good Shepherd in Raleigh, North Carolina, while in 1887 he became rector of St James's Church in Wilmington, North Carolina. In 1900 he transferred to Richmond, Virginia to become rector of St Paul's Church.

== Bishop ==
On May 26, 1904, Strange was elected Coadjutor Bishop of East Carolina and was consecrated on November 1, 1904 in St James's Church with the Bishop of South Carolina Ellison Capers as primary consecrator. He succeeded as diocesan bishop in April 1905 and retained the post till his death in 1914.
