= Elisabeth Chant =

American painter

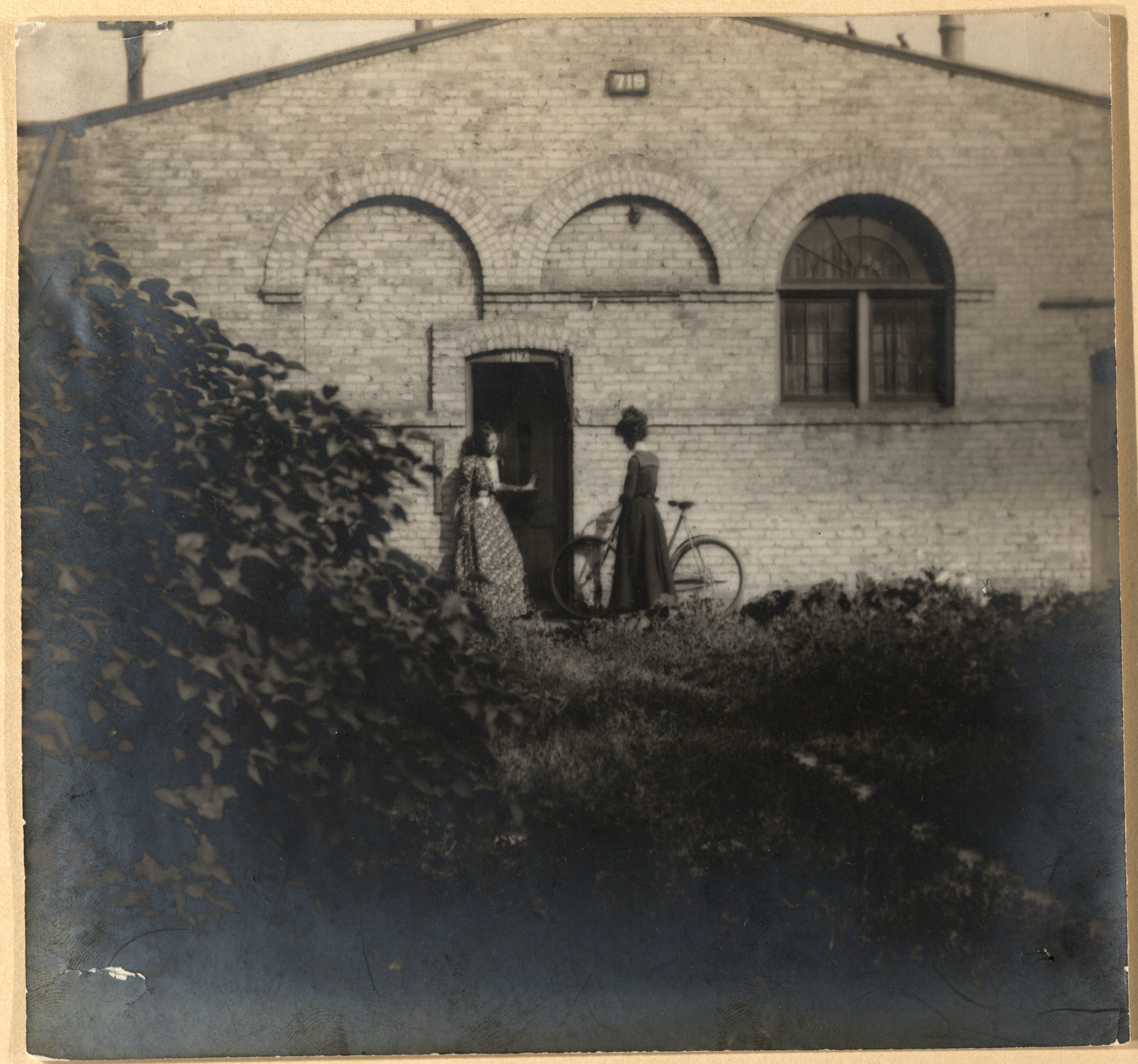
Chant (left) at the studio of the Minneapolis Art School (1889)

Elisabeth Augusta Chant (March 10, 1865 – September 21, 1947) was an American painter and teacher, noted especially for her landscapes.

== Early life and education ==
Born in Yeovil, Somerset, Chant was the daughter of James Chant, a merchant captain involved in the Asian spice trade, and Elizabeth Rowe Wills; she was one of nine children. She claimed that before she was seven she had sailed the world as one of her father's passengers. With her family she immigrated to the United States in 1873, settling in Hawley, Minnesota, with numerous other Yeovil residents; upon her mother's death, her father moved the family to Minneapolis and opened a market. She early displayed a taste for art, but was encouraged to turn her talents elsewhere, so she enrolled in the Training School for Nurses at Northwestern Hospital for Women and Children and graduated in 1886.

== Nursing and art ==
She continued taking art lessons, studying with Douglas Volk between 1890 and 1893 and receiving instructions in the evenings from Burt Harwood. The outbreak of the Spanish–American War in 1898 saw her transferred by the American Red Cross to the American South, where she worked in Savannah and Augusta, Georgia. She was discharged in 1899 and returned to Minneapolis, becoming active with the Handicraft Guild and the Minneapolis Art League and creating murals and decorative paintings as well as pottery and prints. During a two-year sojourn in England beginning in 1901 she traced her family's relationship to King Arthur and his court, with the result that much of her work became focused on medieval legends. The tour also provided fodder for a series of feature articles for the Minneapolis Journal. A decade later she moved to Springfield, Massachusetts for work, remaining for six years at a firm that specialized in various interior fittings and furnishings.

== Treatment for manic depression ==
Chant long had a reputation as an eccentric – in later years she dressed in an outré manner and claimed to talk to "spirits" – and in July 1917 concerns about her well-being led members of her family to have her arrested and committed to the Minnesota Sanitarium. Later in the year she was transferred to the Rochester Hospital in Rochester, where she underwent treatment for manic depression, a condition which may have been exacerbated by the deaths of several family members and a close friend.

== Travels, return, and promotion of art in Wilmington ==
On her release in 1920 she began a trip to China, Japan, Korea, and the Philippines, all of which she had visited in childhood; upon her return to the United States she settled in Wilmington, North Carolina, forswearing nearly all ties with her family. In Wilmington Chant first attempted to establish an art colony; when prevented by limited finances and poor health, she turned her attention instead to supporting the local artistic community. In 1923 she established the Wilmington Art League, which later led to the creation of the Wilmington Art Association. She was also active in promoting the creation of the Wilmington Museum of Art, which opened in 1938 and which was the forerunner of the town's current art museum. She taught design, painting, and batik, both in her own studio and at the museum; pupils included Claude Howell, Henry Jay MacMillan, Helen MacMillan Lane, Hester Donnelly, and Joe Nesbitt. She encouraged her pupils to look to the wider world for influence; her own work was informed by the Arts and Crafts Movement, the work of the Pre-Raphaelites, and the art of William Morris.

== Death ==
Chant died in Wilmington and is buried there in Oakdale Cemetery.
