= Sidney Sanders =

American Episcopalian bishop (1930–1997)

The Right Reverend Brice Sidney Sanders D.D.
- Bishop of East Carolina
- Church: Episcopal Church
- Diocese: East Carolina
- In office: 1983–1997
- Predecessor: Hunley A. Elebash
- Successor: Clifton Daniel
- Previous post: Coadjutor Bishop of East Carolina (1979-1983)

Orders
- Ordination: February 22, 1956 by John Vander Horst
- Consecration: October 26, 1979 by John Allin

Personal details
- Born: October 15, 1930 Nashville, Tennessee, United States
- Died: June 5, 1997 (aged 66) Greenville, North Carolina, United States
- Denomination: Anglican
- Parents: Waller Richard Sanders, Agnes Mortimer Jones
- Spouse: Nancy Elizabeth Robinson
- Children: 3
- Education: Vanderbilt University

Brice Sidney Sanders (October 15, 1930 – June 5, 1997) was sixth bishop of the Episcopal Diocese of East Carolina between 1983 till 1997.

== Early life and education ==
Sanders was born on October 15, 1930, in Nashville, Tennessee, the son of Waller Richard Sanders and Agnes Mortimer Jones. His brother, William Evan Sanders, served as the eighth Bishop of Tennessee. He studied at Vanderbilt University from where he graduated with a Bachelor of Arts in 1952 and later at the Episcopal Theological School from where he earned his Master of Sacred Theology in 1955. On August 22, 1953, he married Nancy Elizabeth Robinson and together had three children. He was awarded a Doctor of Divinity from the Virginia Theological Seminary in 1980 and another from the University of the South in 1984.

== Ordained ministry ==
Sanders was ordained deacon in 1955 and priest on February 22, 1956, by Bishop John Vander Horst, Suffragan Bishop of Tennessee, at St James' Church, Union City, Tennessee. He was in charge of St James' from 1955 to 1958. In 1958 he became rector of the Church of the Good Shepherd, in Fountain City, Tennessee, and in 1961 became rector of Eastern Shore Chapel in Virginia Beach, Virginia. Between 1970 and 1975, he served as chaplain and associate dean for student affairs at Virginia Theological Seminary, before becoming Dean of St Andrew's Cathedral in Jackson, Mississippi in 1975.

== Episcopacy ==
On June 9, 1979, Sanders was elected on the second ballot, as the Coadjutor Bishop of East Carolina, during a special convention in New Bern, North Carolina. He was then consecrated on October 26, 1979, with Presiding Bishop John Allin as primary consecrator, at St Mary's Church in Kinston, North Carolina. He succeeded as diocesan bishop in August 1983 and remained bishop till his death in 1997.
