= Episcopal Diocese of East Carolina =

Episcopal Church diocese in the US

Coordinates: 35.2927°N 77.5872°W

Diocese of East Carolina

Location
- Country: United States
- Ecclesiastical province: Province IV
- Deaneries: 5
- Headquarters: Kinston

Statistics
- Parishes: 67 (2024)
- Members: 14,133 (2023)

Information
- First holder: Alfred A. Watson
- Denomination: Episcopal Church
- Established: October 9, 1883
- Secular priests: 51
- Language: English, Spanish

Current leadership
- Parent church: Episcopal Church
- Bishop: Sarah Fisher
- Archdeacons: 1
- Bishops emeritus: Robert Skirving

Map
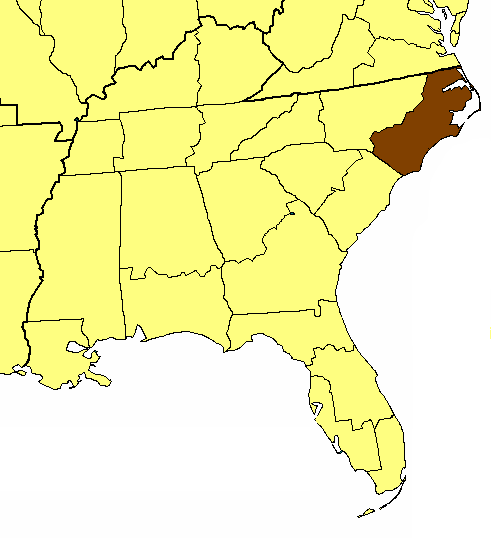
- Location of the Diocese of East Carolina

Website
- www.diocese-eastcarolina.org

The Episcopal Diocese of East Carolina is a diocese of the Episcopal Church in the United States that covers most of eastern North Carolina. The diocese was formed from the existing Diocese of North Carolina on October 9, 1883, by action of the General Convention of the Episcopal Church. It consists of the congregations of the Episcopal Church in the eastern portion of the state of North Carolina and forms part of Province IV of the Episcopal Church. Major cities of the diocese include Wilmington, Fayetteville, New Bern, and Greenville. Originally its offices were located in Wilmington, but in 1983 a new diocesan house was built in Kinston, North Carolina, in order to be located more centrally in the diocese's territory. The diocese's current bishop is Sarah Fisher.

In 2024, the diocese reported average Sunday attendance (ASA) of 4,215 persons, a decrease from 6,234 in 2015. No membership statistics were reported in 2024 national parochial reports. In 2015, the church reported 17,385 members; in 2023, it reported 14,133 members.

== History ==
=== Colonial Beginnings ===
The first Anglican presence in what would become the Episcopal Diocese of East Carolina began with Sir Walter Raleigh's Roanoke Colony in 1584. The first Anglican baptisms in the colony and on the North American Continent as a whole occurred in August 1587, with those of Manteo and Virginia Dare on August 18 and August 20, respectively. The Roanoke Colony disappeared sometime between 1570 and 1590. In 1663, a Royal Charter granted religious tolerance to the settlers of the colony while also supporting and offering patronage for churches and clergy under the authority of the governor. No Anglican clergy were in the province at this time.

The first law to establish the Church of England in North Carolina was the Vestry Act of 1701. The act formed five parishes across the colony, each with a vestry of twelve vestrymen who were responsible for building a church, securing a reader for services, levying taxes for revenue, and helping the poor and orphans. The proprietors of the colony disallowed this act because they deemed that the vestry to be too powerful and the support for the clergy was to be insufficient. However, this act was put into effect in the Chowan precinct, which over time led to the foundation of St. Paul's Church in Edenton, North Carolina. Also during this time, St. Thomas' Episcopal Church in Bath, North Carolina, was founded. The vestry acts of 1704-1705 and 1711 were similarly ineffective. The Vestry Act of 1715 was allowed to stand, and progress began to be made, albeit slowly, and the establishment was weak.

Despite the establishment of the Church of England in North Carolina, issues quickly arose. Like in all of the American colonies, there was no bishop in the colony itself, and the colony was under the jurisdiction of the Bishop of London. Anyone seeking ordination or confirmation had to make the arduous journey across the Atlantic to England. Because of this, there were never enough clergymen to minister to the thirty-two parishes established in the colony by 1774, and the population of around 18,000 Anglicans.

Some of the most important clergymen during the colonial period included missionaries sent by the Society for the Propagation of the Gospel, such as the Reverends James Adams, Giles Rainsford, and Ebenezer Taylor. The Reverend John LaPierre, a French Huguenot and Anglican clergyman, relocated from South Carolina to the Cape Fear region in 1728 and subsequently to New Bern in 1735, where he served until he died in 1755. The Rev. Dr. Richard Marsden, also from South Carolina, was called the best minister in America by a member of the Governor's Council. At the same time, he served in New Hanover and Onslow Counties. John Boyd was the first candidate for ordination from North Carolina, sailing to London to be ordained by the Bishop of London, and then returning to serve in Bertie, Chowan, and Brunswick Counties. The Rev. John Garzia served at St. Thomas' Episcopal Church in Bath from 1735 until he died in 1744. Clement Hall, a local from Perquimans County, was ordained a deacon and priest by the Bishop of London in 1744. Upon return to North Carolina served as the rector of St. Paul's Church in Edenton for fifteen years. During his ministry, Hall traveled 14,000 miles, delivered 675 sermons, and baptized over 6,000 people. Hall employed the services of Daniel Earle in 1756 as schoolmaster in Edenton, founding the first secondary school in North Carolina. Earle, after becoming schoolmaster, took holy orders and succeeded Hall as rector of St. Paul's upon Hall's death in 1759.

=== The Revolutionary War and the Formation of a New Diocese ===
During the rising tension leading up to the American Revolutionary War, Anglican clergy in the colony faced a difficult decision. Some remained loyal to the British Crown and were forced from their parishes or left after the British withdrawal. Some stayed in place and were somewhat tolerated. And some were entirely on board with the patriot cause and adjusted toward the patriot movement. The North Carolina State Convention disestablished the Church of England in 1776. The Protestant Episcopal Church in the United States of America was established with a series of three General Conventions from 1785 to 1789. Despite the formation of this new American church, a diocese was not established in North Carolina until 1817. Attempts to form a diocese started at conventions held in 1790, 1793, and 1794. During these conventions, the Rev. Charles Pettigrew was elected Bishop but was never consecrated, and the diocese remained unformed.

The Episcopal Diocese of North Carolina was finally formed in 1817 at a convention held in New Bern, being placed under the supervision of the Bishop of Virginia. The diocese did not have its own bishop until 1823, when at that year's Diocesan Convention the Rev. John Stark Ravenscroft was elected bishop. Ravenscroft was consecrated in Philadelphia. The diocese spanned the entirety of the State of North Carolina, but consisted of only twenty-five parishes, mostly located in the eastern part of the state. John Ravenscroft died in 1830 and was subsequently replaced by the Rev. Levi Silliman Ives as bishop of the diocese. Ives struggled with the doctrinal appeal of the Roman Catholic Church and resigned as bishop in 1852 to convert to the Roman Catholic faith. After Ives resigned, the Rev. Thomas Atkinson was chosen to succeed him as bishop. Atkinson was the bishop of the diocese at the time of the American Civil War. The war brought struggles into the, diocese leading to the suspension of services and the exiling of clergy. Some clergymen served as military chaplains, namely the Rev. Alfred A. Watson. In 1862, the diocese became affiliated with the Protestant Episcopal Church in the Confederate States of America, but quickly rejoined the northern church after the war. Thomas Atkinson's declining health led to the Diocesan Convention of 1866 to consider dividing the diocese. At the Diocesan Convention of 1873, under Atkinson's recommendation, the convention elected the Rev. Theodore Benedict Lyman as an assistant bishop. Talks of dividing the diocese continued at the following conventions. Lyman became diocesan bishop after Atkinson died in 1881. Lyman was opposed to dividing the diocese but agreed after a set of conditions were met. At the 1883 convention, the diocese voted to divide itself into a new diocese, comprising everything east of what is now Interstate 95.

=== The Diocese of East Carolina ===
The inaugural convention of the new diocese took place in December 1883. At that time, they chose the name "The Diocese of East Carolina," as proposed by the Rev. Dr. Joseph C. Huske, Rector of St. John's in Fayetteville, North Carolina. Also at this convention, the Rev. Dr. Alfred A. Watson was unanimously elected bishop of the new diocese and was consecrated in April 1884, with Bishop Lyman participating. The first diocesan convention, presided over by Watson, occurred in May 1884; however the constitution and canons of the new diocese were adopted at the next convention in 1885. The diocese was divided into three missionary districts, Edenton, New Bern, and Wilmington, each meeting twice a year under its dean. Problems quickly arose in the newborn diocese, one of which was the lack of adequate support from the poor and rural agricultural area for missions and clergy. The Bishop's Fund for Diocesan Missions and the poorly paid clergy was established in 1886. Two years later, the Woman's Auxiliary of the diocese held its first annual meeting. In 1903, Watson suffered from a stroke, but he did not request a coadjutor bishop until May of the following year. The Rev. Robert Strange was the man elected as coadjutor bishop, and he succeeded Watson as diocesan bishop upon Watson's death on Good Friday, 1905.

Robert Strange was the first North Carolina native to serve as an Episcopal bishop in the state, hailing from Wilmington. Before becoming bishop, as a deacon, Strange served as a missionary to the African American population in Brunswick County, Virginia. The Rev. William George Avant was appointed as archdeacon "for colored work" in East Carolina. Strange became ill in 1913, transferring ecclesiastical authority to the Standing Committee and succumbing to his illness in 1914. After Strange's death, the Rev. Thomas Campbell Darst was elected to succeed him in 1914 and consecrated in 1915.

Thomas Darst was the bishop when the United States entered World War I. Darst offered ways in which the diocese could serve the nation during wartime, suggesting that it join the armed forces, make financial contributions, provide agricultural contributions, and have clergy act as chaplains. In 1930, Darst purchased a property on the Pamlico River to build Camp Leach as the Diocese's first camp and conference center. Camp Leach was initially a summer camp only for white children. Women were allowed to be elected delegates to the Diocesan Convention in 1937 after 16 years of debate. Under the leadership of the Rev. Robert I. Johnson, Rector of St. Cyprian's Church, New Bern, the diocese sponsored the Good Shepherd Hospital and training school in 1938 with the purpose of serving the African Americans of the diocese and providing doctoral training. Darst was also the bishop when World War II began in 1939. Offering much the same support as during World War I, however, the war proved too much for the diocese, requiring additional support from the national church. The Rev. Robert I. Johnson was appointed Archdeacon of the Colored Convocation in 1943. Darst retired in 1945 due to illness and was succeeded by the Rev. Thomas Henry Wright who was consecrated later that year.

Wright was elected unanimously in 1945, as there was only one name on the ballot. In 1949, the diocese acquired a piece of land by Alice Green Hoffman. That property is where the modern Trinity Center is located. In 1955, leadership from the historically black congregations of the diocese opened Camp Oceanside in Ocean City Beach on Topsail Island in rented facilities. The camp quickly outgrew the rented facilities, and in 1960, a new space for the camp was dedicated, built on land donated by land developers. In 1958, the Woman's Auxiliary of the diocese changed its name to the Episcopal Churchwomen and continued to serve as missionaries and social servants. The Rev. Hunley Agee Elebash was elected to serve as coadjutor bishop in 1968.

Bishop Wright retired in 1973, and Bishop Elebash succeeded him as Diocesan Bishop. Elebash led the diocese during the revision of the 1928 American Edition of the Book of Common Prayer which culminated in 1979 Edition. During Elebash's term as bishop, women were first allowed to be ordination in the Episcopal Church, and he ordained the first female priest in the diocese, the Rev. Wendy Raynor, in 1977. Elebash called for a coadjutor in 1979, and that coadjutor, the Rev. Brice Sidney Sanders, succeeded Elebash in 1983.

Sanders' Episcopacy saw the establishment of a new camp and conference center, known as Trinity Center constructed. In 1985, Camp Leach and Camp Oceanside were closed to make way for a new integrated camp at Trinity Center. Sanders called for a Coadjutor in 1995.

The Rev. Canon Clifton Daniel 3rd was elected as Sander's coadjutor and succeeded him after his death the following year. In 2005, Daniel asked that Bishop Santosh Murray, who had previously served in Guyana, the Bahamas, Florida, and the Seychelles, become his assisting bishop. Murray accepted a call to serve as Bishop Assisting in the Diocese of Alabama, leaving East Carolina in 2012. Bishop Daniel resigned in 2013 to serve as Bishop Provisional of the Diocese of Pennsylvania.

The Rev. Peter James Lee was elected as Bishop Provisional in 2013, a position he held until he left the diocese in 2014 to serve in Washington, D.C.

The. Rev. Robert Skirving was elected and consecrated as Diocesan Bishop in 2014. On November 16, 2024, he called for the election of his successor, stating that by his intended step-down date in 2026, he will have served in ordained ministry for 40 years and "will be ready to retire." On November 15, 2025, at the 142nd Diocesan Convention held at the Maxwell Agricultural Convention Center in Goldsboro, North Carolina, the Rev. Sarah Fisher, rector of St. Catherine’s Episcopal Church in Marietta, Georgia, was elected to be the next bishop of the diocese after three ballots. Fisher's ordination and consecration as the ninth Bishop was held at the Riverfront Convention Center in New Bern on May 23, 2026. Consents were received on January 9, 2026. Skirving retired following Fisher's consecration after 11 years as bishop. Fisher is the first female and same-sex married bishop of the diocese. Also at the 142nd Diocesan Convention, Trinity Center's 50th anniversary was celebrated with remarks by the Rev. Phillip Craig of St. James Episcopal Church in Wilmington, North Carolina.

The diocese primarily speaks English but has extensive resources for Spanish-speaking ministry, headed by a Spanish-language ministry coordinator and the Episcopal Farmworker Ministry of the Parish of La Sagrada Familia, based in Sampson County.

== List of bishops ==
Bishops of East Carolina
From	Until	Incumbent	Notes
1884	1905	Alfred A. Watson	Alfred Augustin Watson (August 21, 1818, Brooklyn, NY – April 21, 1905, Wilmington, NC); elected December 13, 1883 and consecrated April 17, 1884; died in office.
1905	1914	Robert Strange	(December 6, 1857, Wilmington, NC – August 23, 1914, Wilmington, NC); elected coadjutor before October 7, 1903 and consecrated November 1, 1904; died in office.
1915	1945	Thomas C. Darst	Thomas Campbell Darst (November 10, 1875, Pulaski, VA – September 1, 1948); elected October 7, 1914 and consecrated January 6, 1915; retired May 1, 1945.
1945	1973	Tom Wright	Thomas Henry Wright (October 16, 1904, Wilmington, NC – April 26, 1997, Porter's Neck, NC); elected May 24 and consecrated October 5, 1945; retired 1973.
1973	1983	Hunley A. Elebash	Hunley Agee Elebash (July 23, 1923, Pensacola, FL – October 20, 1993, Wilmington, NC); elected coadjutor before September 27 and consecrated October 2, 1968; retired August, 1983.
1991	2009	Charles Vaché, assisting bishop	Claude Charles Vaché (August 4, 1926, North Carolina – November 1, 2009, Virginia Beach, VA); retired Bishop of Southern Virginia.
1983	1997	B. Sidney Sanders	Brice Sidney Sanders (October 15, 1930 – June 5, 1997); elected coadjutor and consecrated June 9, 1979; died in office.
1997	2013	Clifton Daniel	Coadjutor since 1996. Diocesan from 1997 to 2013. Resigned February 28, 2013 to become Bishop Provisional of The Diocese of Pennsylvania.
2009	2012	Santosh Marray, Bishop Assisting	Previously Bishop of the Seychelles. Later assistant bishop of the Diocese of Alabama, bishop of the Diocese of Easton.
2013	2015	Peter James Lee, Bishop Provisional	Previously Bishop of Virginia, retired. Elected Bishop Provisional at Saint Paul's Episcopal Church in Greenville, NC on March 9, 2013.
2015	2026	Robert Skirving	Elected Diocesan Bishop at Christ Church in New Bern, NC on May 17, 2015. Consecrated November 8, 2014. Bishop Diocesan.
2026	Present	Sarah Fisher	Elected Diocesan Bishop at the Maxwell Agricultural Convention Center in Goldsboro, NC on November 15, 2025. Consecrated May 23, 2026 at the Riverfront Convention Center in New Bern, NC. Bishop Diocesan.
