= John D. Barry =

Confederate Army general (1839–1867)

John Decatur Barry
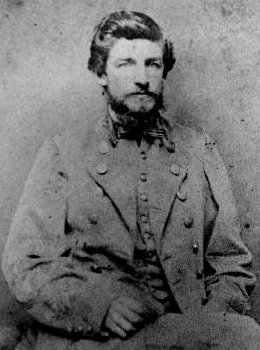
- Born: June 21, 1839; Wilmington, North Carolina
- Died: March 24, 1867 (aged 27); Wilmington, North Carolina
- Burial place: Oakdale Cemetery; Wilmington, North Carolina
- Military career
- Allegiance: Confederate States of America
- Branch: Confederate States Army
- Service years: 1861–1865
- Rank: Colonel; Brigadier General (temporary)
- Commands: 18th North Carolina Infantry; Lane's Brigade (temporary)
- Conflicts: American Civil War; Peninsula Campaign; Northern Virginia Campaign; Maryland Campaign; Battle of Chancellorsville; Gettysburg campaign; Overland Campaign; Siege of Petersburg; First Battle of Deep Bottom (WIA)
- Other work: Newspaper editor

John Decatur Barry (June 21, 1839 – March 24, 1867) was an officer in the Confederate States Army during the American Civil War. The men he was leading at the Battle of Chancellorsville mistakenly fired on Confederate General Stonewall Jackson, leading to Jackson's death.

== Early life ==
Barry was born in Wilmington, North Carolina on June 21, 1839. He was a grandson of James Owen and a great-nephew of John Owen. He was educated at the University of North Carolina at Chapel Hill.

== Civil War ==
Barry enlisted in Company I of the 18th North Carolina Infantry when the Civil War began. He was elected captain of Company I in April 1862. The 18th was part of Lawrence O'Bryan Branch's brigade, and took part in all of the major battles with A.P. Hill's Light Division. Barry was wounded at the Battle of Frayser's Farm during the Peninsula Campaign.

Following the Battle of Antietam, James H. Lane was promoted to succeed Branch as brigadier general, and Barry was promoted to major. At the Chancellorsville, Barry gave the order to fire on Stonewall Jackson's party as they attempted to ride through Lane's brigade, believing they were Union cavalry. Despite the error, Barry was promoted to colonel of the 18th North Carolina after the battle. He led the regiment during Pickett's Charge on July 3 at Gettysburg. Throughout the 1864 Overland Campaign, Barry continued to lead the 18th North Carolina.

Lane was wounded at the Battle of Cold Harbor on June 2 and Barry was temporarily appointed brigadier general to replace him. However, on July 27, at the First Battle of Deep Bottom, Barry was wounded in the right hand, losing two fingers. Because he was disabled and Lane returned to lead the brigade, the temporary appointment to brigadier general was canceled. In February 1865, Barry was ordered to command a department in North Carolina.

Barry's military service was commended by his superiors. Colonel Thomas Purdie praised his "coolness and gallantry and devotion to duty". General Lane remembered Barry as "one of my bravest and most accomplished officers".

== Postbellum activities ==
Barry died within two years of the surrender of Confederate forces. Returning home in poor health, he edited a newspaper in Wilmington before dying on March 24, 1867. Some of his friends and family said that Barry "died of a broken heart" for his role in Jackson's death. He is buried in Oakdale Cemetery in Wilmington.

== See also ==
- List of American Civil War generals (Acting Confederate)
