= Charles J. Mendelsohn =

American cryptographer and classicist

Charles Jastrow Mendelsohn (December 8, 1880 – September 27, 1939) was an American cryptographer and classicist. He was the only child of Rabbi Samuel Mendelsohn and Esther Jastrow.

He was born in Wilmington, North Carolina.

== Education ==
He graduated from the Episcopal Academy, Philadelphia in 1896. He was a Harrison Scholar at the University of Pennsylvania, which he graduated with a Bachelor of Arts in 1900 and a PhD in 1904. He was a member of Phi Beta Kappa. He joined the faculty of College of the City of New York as a tutor in Greek in 1905, becoming an instructor in 1907. He was a professor of ancient languages in 1917.

== Military service ==
During World War I he served in the censorship department of the Post Office Department in 1917, dealing with foreign language, postal and newspaper censorship. His work came to the attention of Herbert Yardley and he was recruited into Military Intelligence, section 8 (MI-8). From 1918 to 1919 he was a captain in the Military Intelligence Division of the War Department General Staff.

He led a team dealing with German diplomatic correspondence, breaking at least six diplomatic ciphers. Two messages dealt with German attempts to get support from Mexico.

He received an honorable discharge.

== Return to civilian life ==
He returned to City College in 1920 as a professor of history. He remained interested in cryptography, writing papers and became interested in the history of the topic, collecting many books on it.

He remained in contact with Herbert Yardley and did part time cryptographic work for the Black Chamber. Together they published the Universal Trade Code, a commercial code. He wrote several works for the Black Chamber, including The Zimmermann Telegram of January 16, 1917, and its Cryptographic Background and Studies in German Diplomatic Codes Employed During the World War.

== Death ==
In 1939, he was recalled to active duty as a result of World War II, but while preparing he contracted meningitis and died of it.

His library, which had been called "probably the most important cryptographic library in America, if not in the world" was bequeathed to the University of Pennsylvania.

He had never married and was survived by his mother. He was buried in the Hebrew Cemetery at Oakdale Cemetery, Wilmington, North Carolina.

== Publications ==
- Studies in the Word-Play in Plautus
- The Zimmermann Telegram of January 16, 1917, and its Cryptographic Background
- Studies in German Diplomatic Codes Employed During the World War
