= Airlie Gardens =

Public garden in Wilmington, North Carolina, U.S.

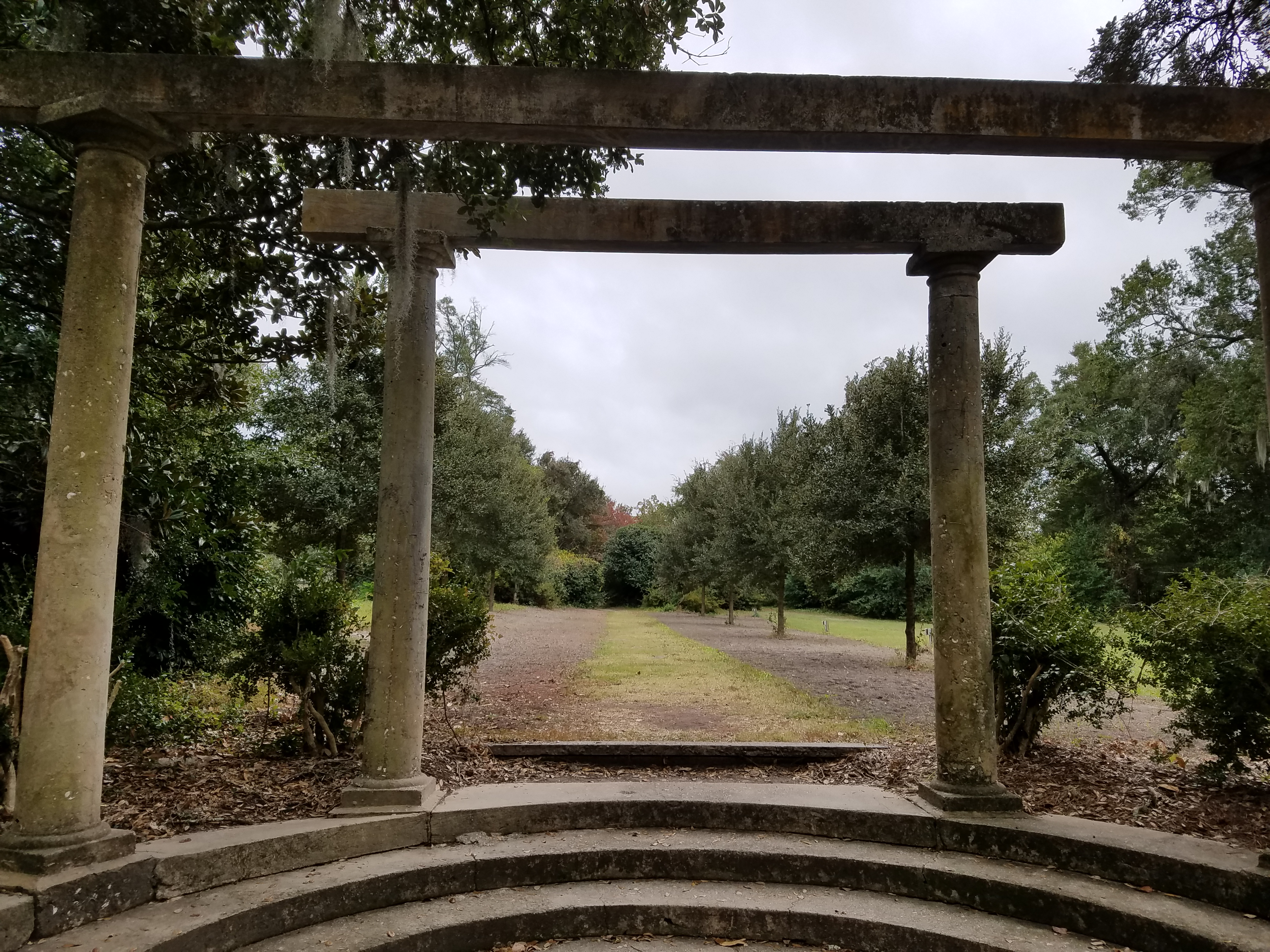
- Arches in Airlie Gardens near Gabriel's Landing

- Location within North Carolina
- Type: Sculpture park
- Location: 300 Airlie Road, Wilmington, NC 28403
- Coordinates: 34°12′54.36″N 77°49′40.44″W
- Area: 67-acre (27 ha)
- Created: 1886
- Founder: Sarah Green Jones
- Operator: New Hanover County
- Status: Open
- Website: https://airliegardens.org/

Airlie Gardens is a 67-acre (27 ha) public garden in Wilmington, North Carolina.

== History ==
It was created in 1886 as a private garden for the Pembroke Jones family by Sarah Green Jones. The name 'Airlie' was derived from the Jones' family home in Scotland. It was designed as a lush, flowing, naturalistic Southern garden, with thousands of azaleas, camellias, magnolias, palms, and wisteria. German landscape architect Rudolf Topel, transformed the garden to a picturesque garden. In 1999, it was purchased by New Hanover County.

In 2018, more than 300 trees were felled due to Hurricane Florence.

Airlie Gardens is a participating member of the American Horticultural Society and offers reciprocal admission for other gardens, arboreta, and conservatories.

African-American folk artist Minnie Evans was the Airlie Gardens admissions gatekeeper for a number of years. In 1954, Evans created an oil on wood painting titled Airlie Oak, which is on display at the Smithsonian American Art Museum.

== Airlie Oak ==
Airlie Oak is a 500-year-old southern live oak (Quercus virginiana) located on the grounds of Airlie Gardens. In 1967, Airlie Oak was registered as member number 238 in the Live Oak Society. In 2007, Airlie Oak was 128 feet (39 m) tall, had a trunk circumference exceeding 21 feet (6.4 m) and a crown spread of 104 feet (32 m) when measured by North Carolina Forest Service employees. At that time, it was designated the largest live oak in North Carolina.

== Mount Lebanon Chapel and Cemetery ==
Located on the grounds of the gardens are the Mount Lebanon Chapel and Cemetery. The chapel, constructed by Thomas H. Wright around 1835, is the oldest surviving church structure in New Hanover County and part of the parish of St. James Church.

== Gallery ==
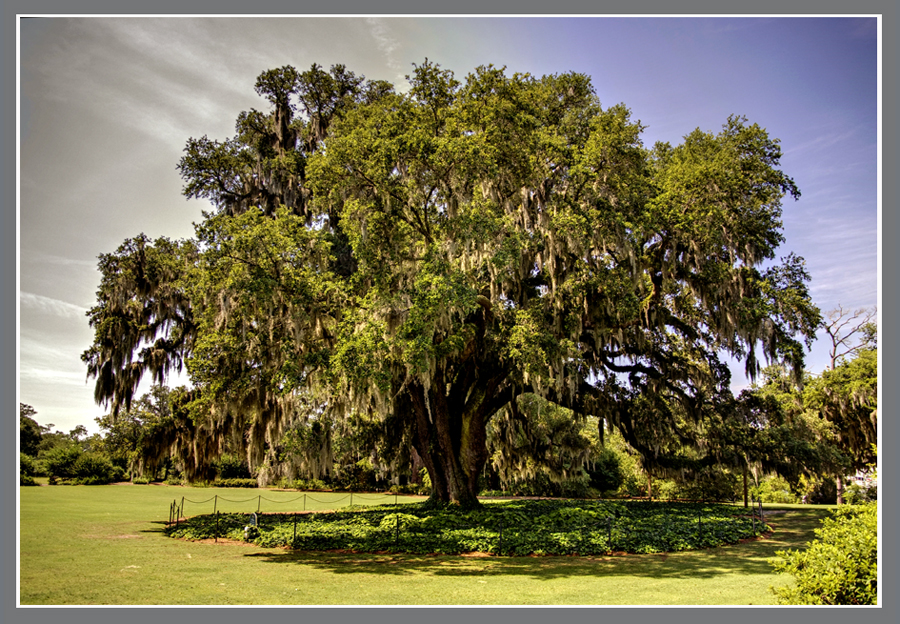
Airlie Oak

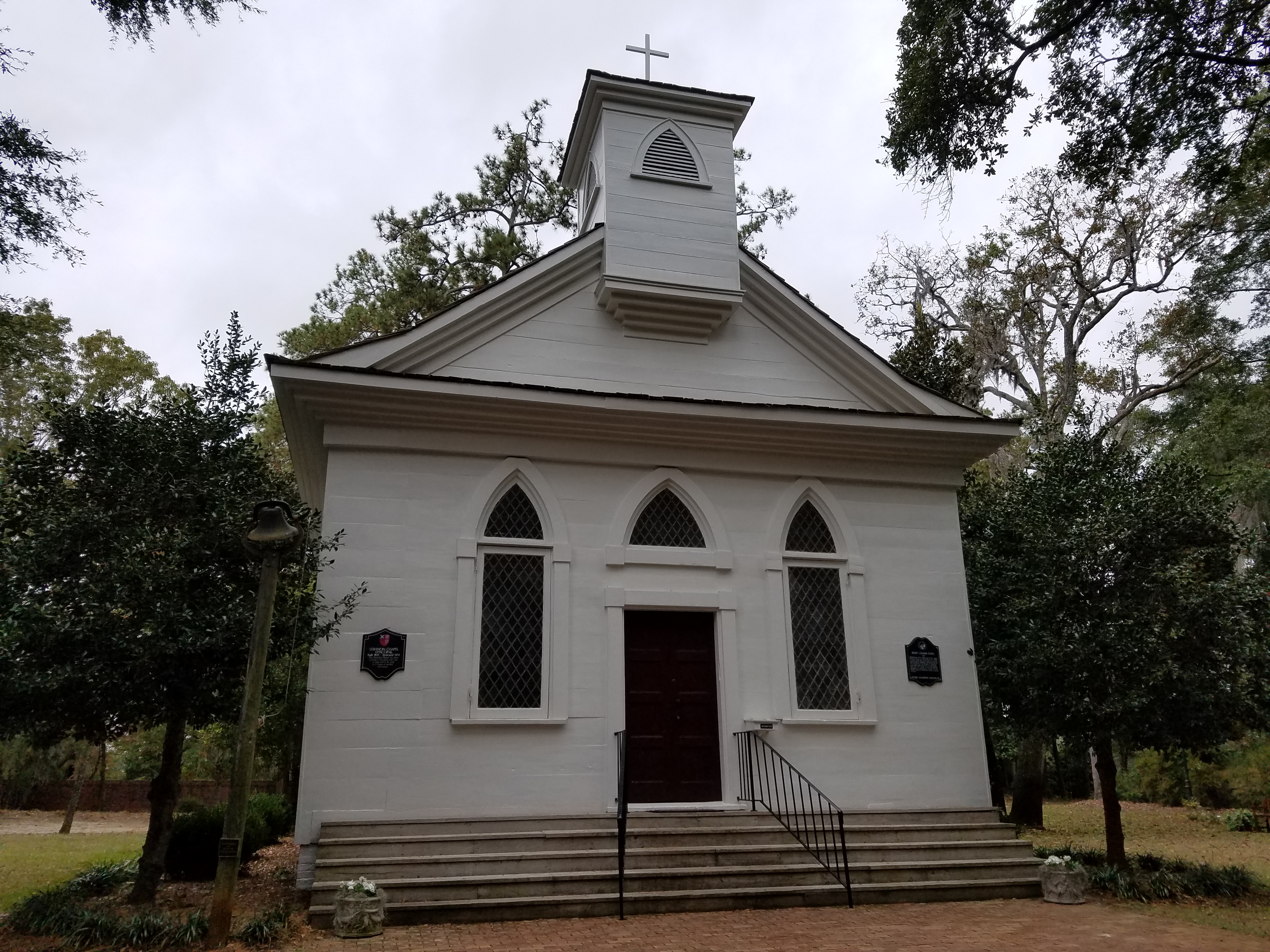
Mount Lebanon Chapel

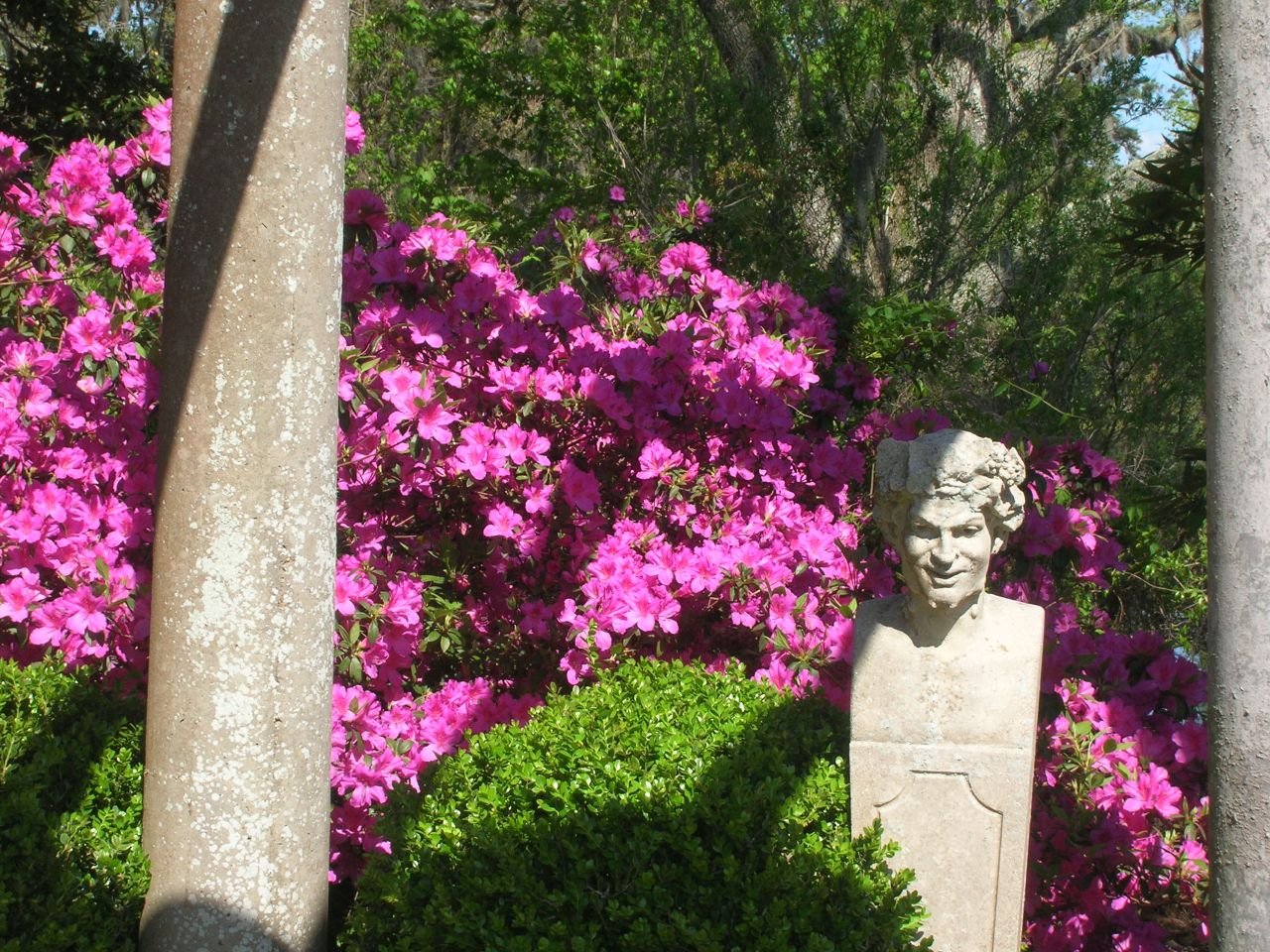
Statue

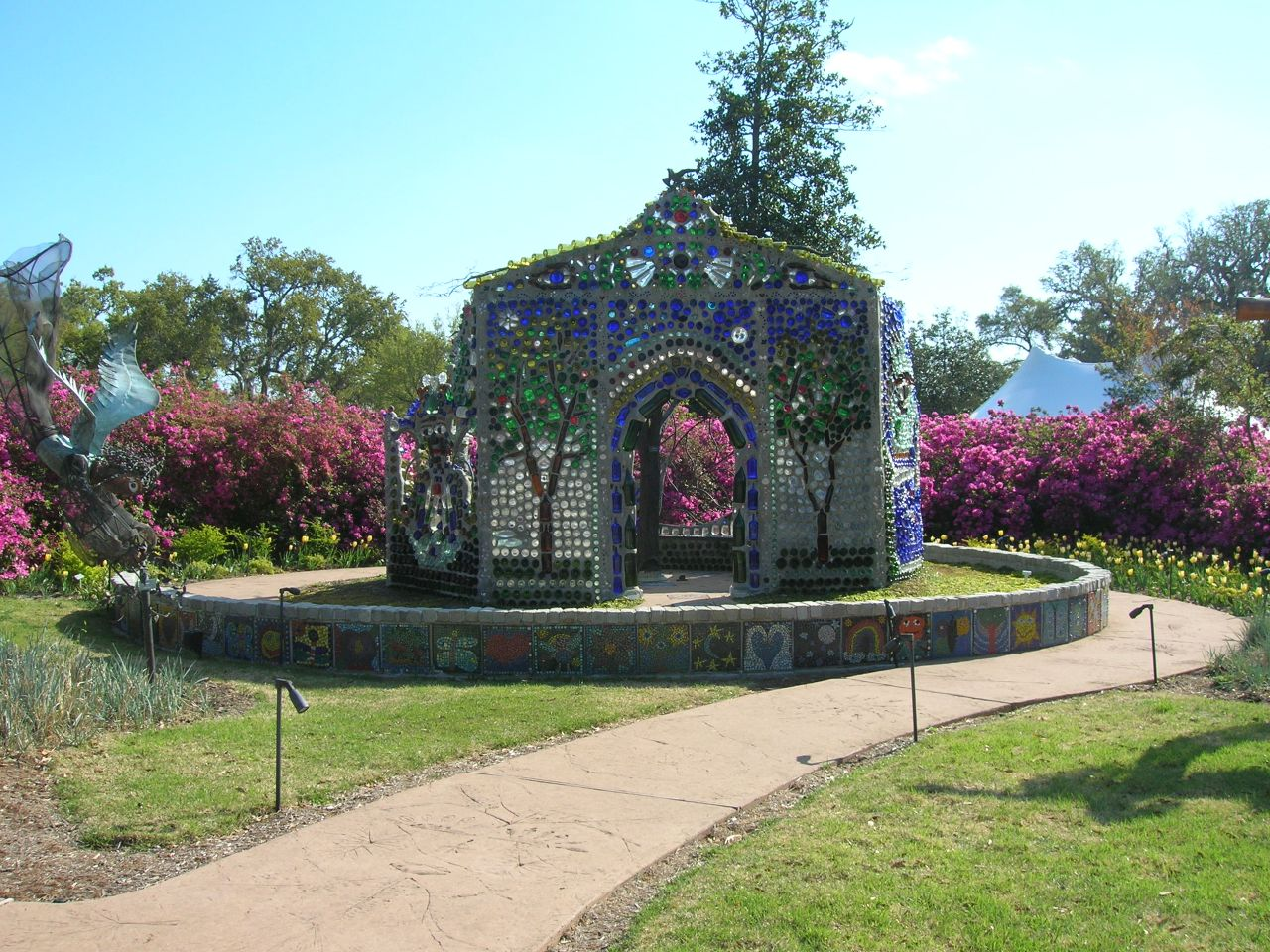
Bottle Chapel

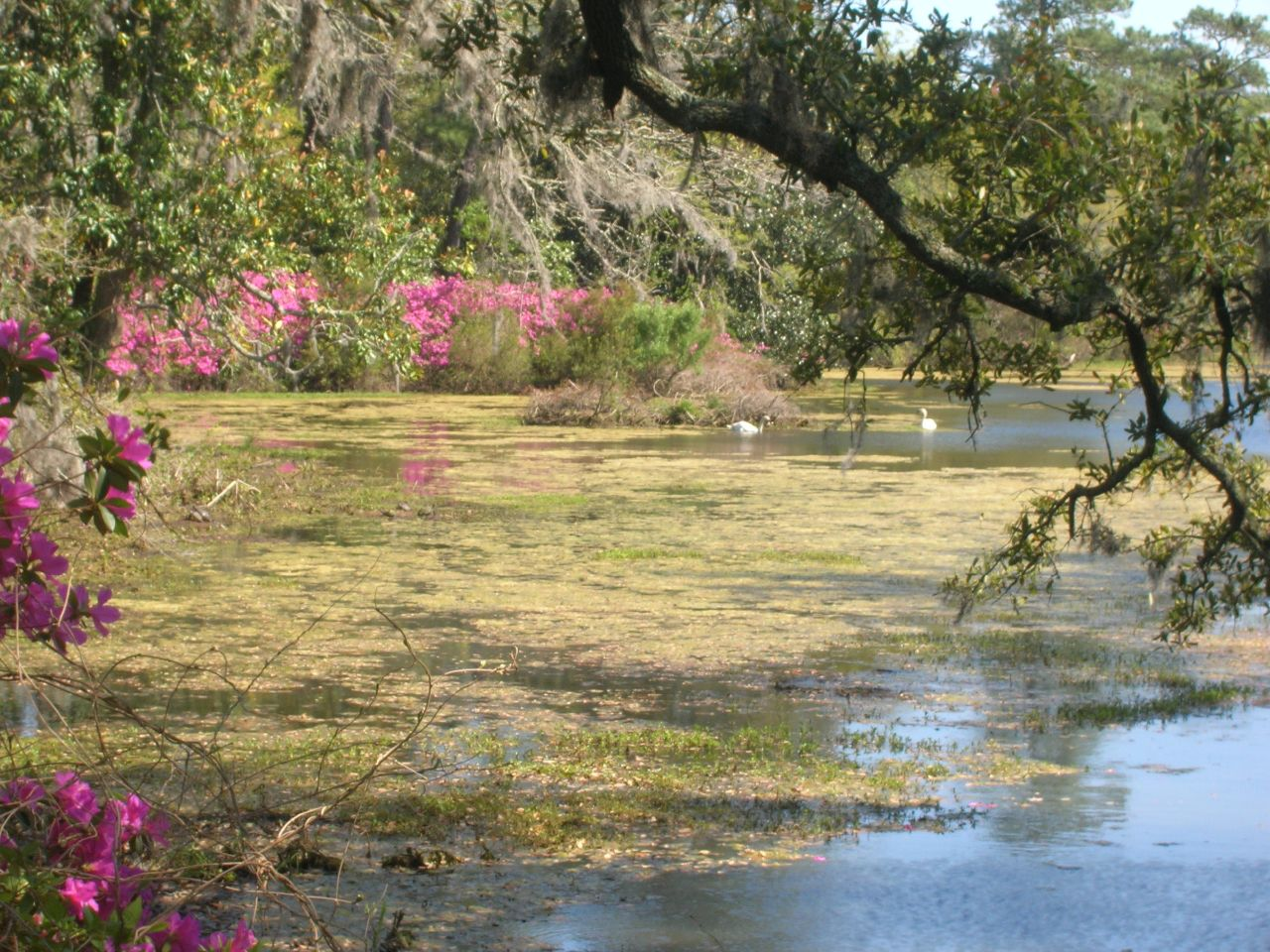
Pond

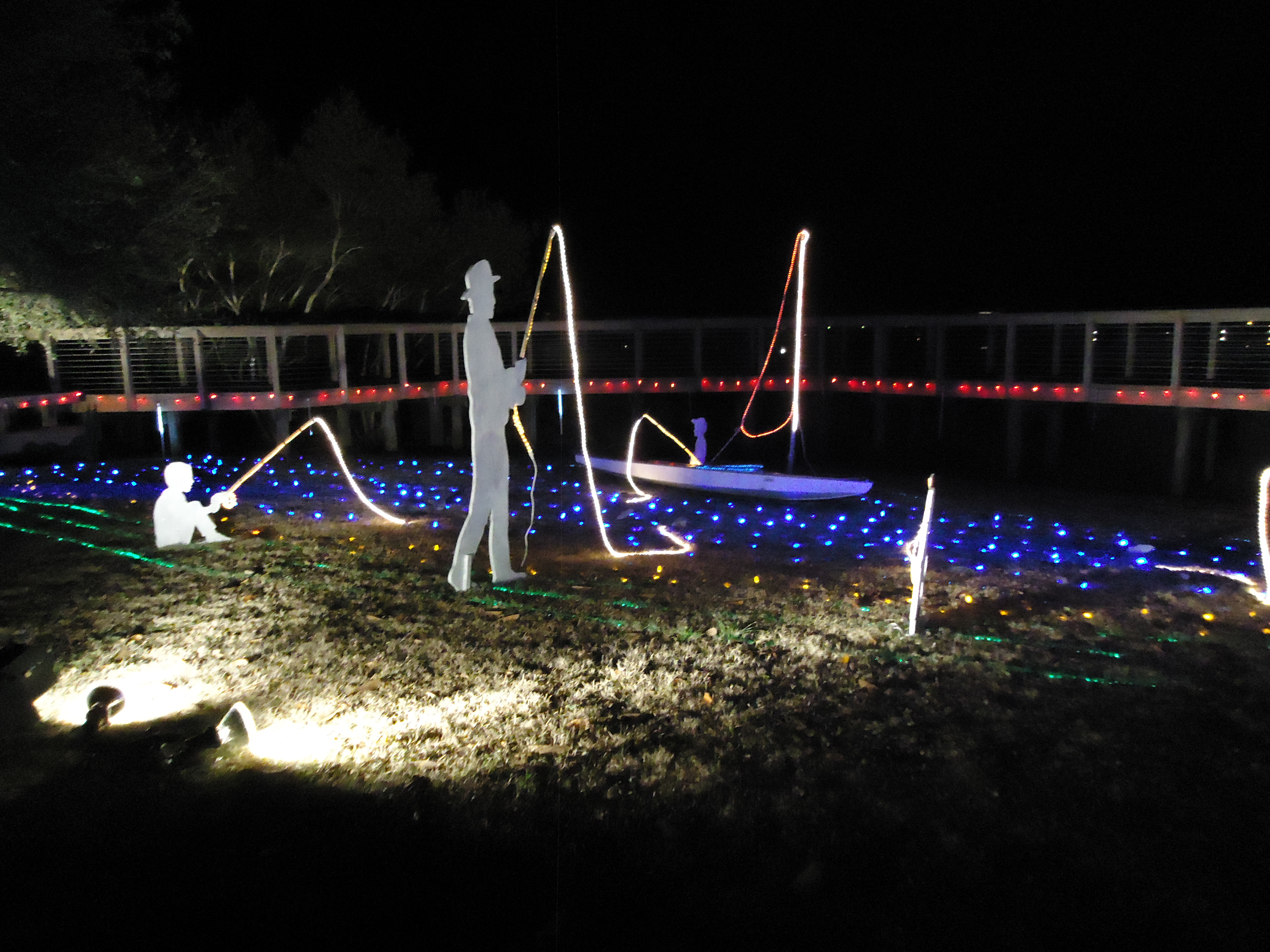
Christmas scene

== See also ==
- List of botanical gardens in the United States
