= Mount Lebanon Chapel and Cemetery =

Historic site in New Hanover County, North Carolina, US

- U.S. National Register of Historic Places
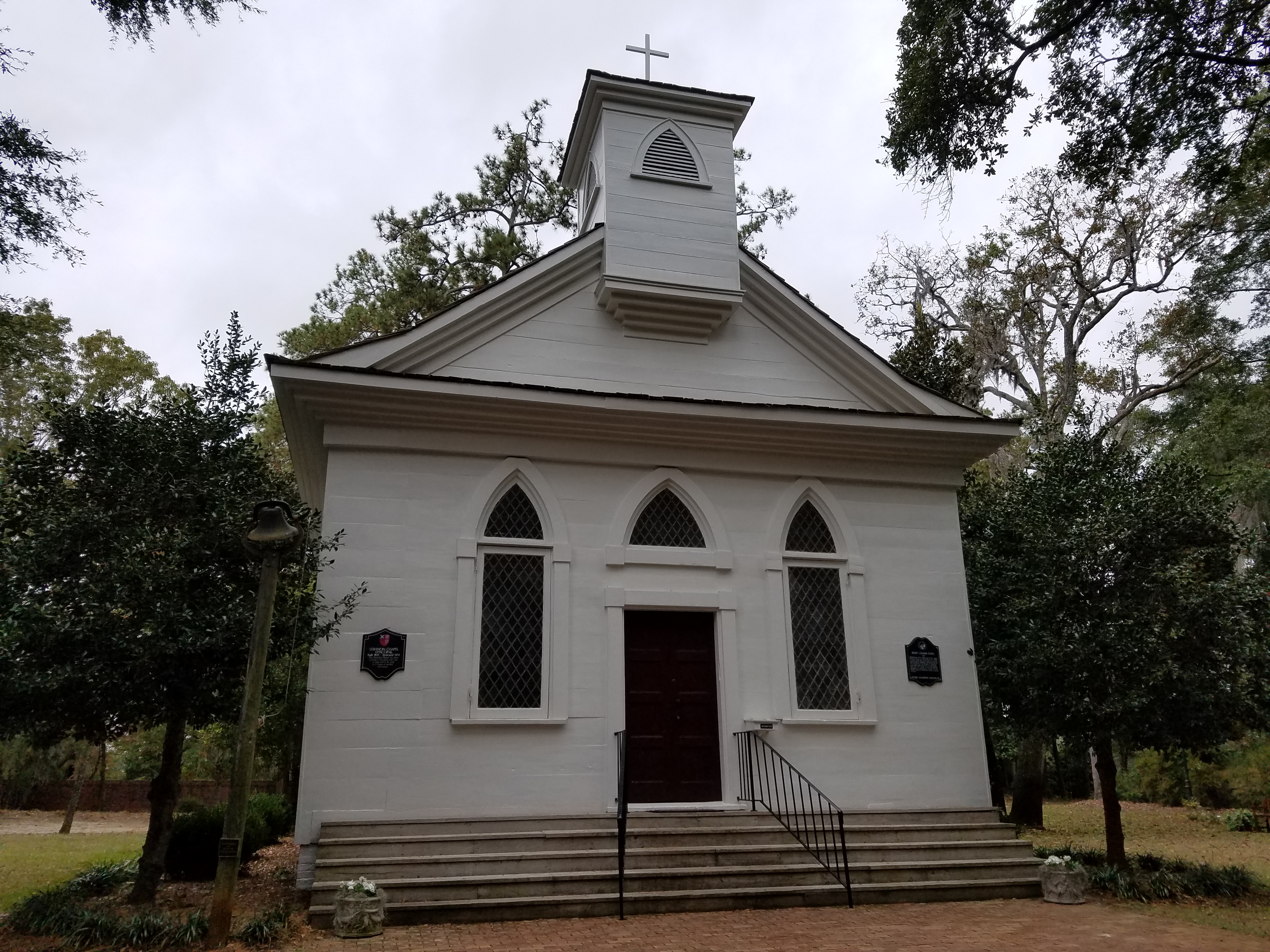

- Location within North Carolina
- Location: Wilmington, North Carolina
- Coordinates: 34°12′50″N 77°49′35″W
- Area: 6.5 acres (2.6 ha)
- Built: 1835
- Architectural style: Greek Revival, Gothic Revival, Vernacular Greco-Gothic
- NRHP reference No.: 86002879
- Added to NRHP: October 16, 1986

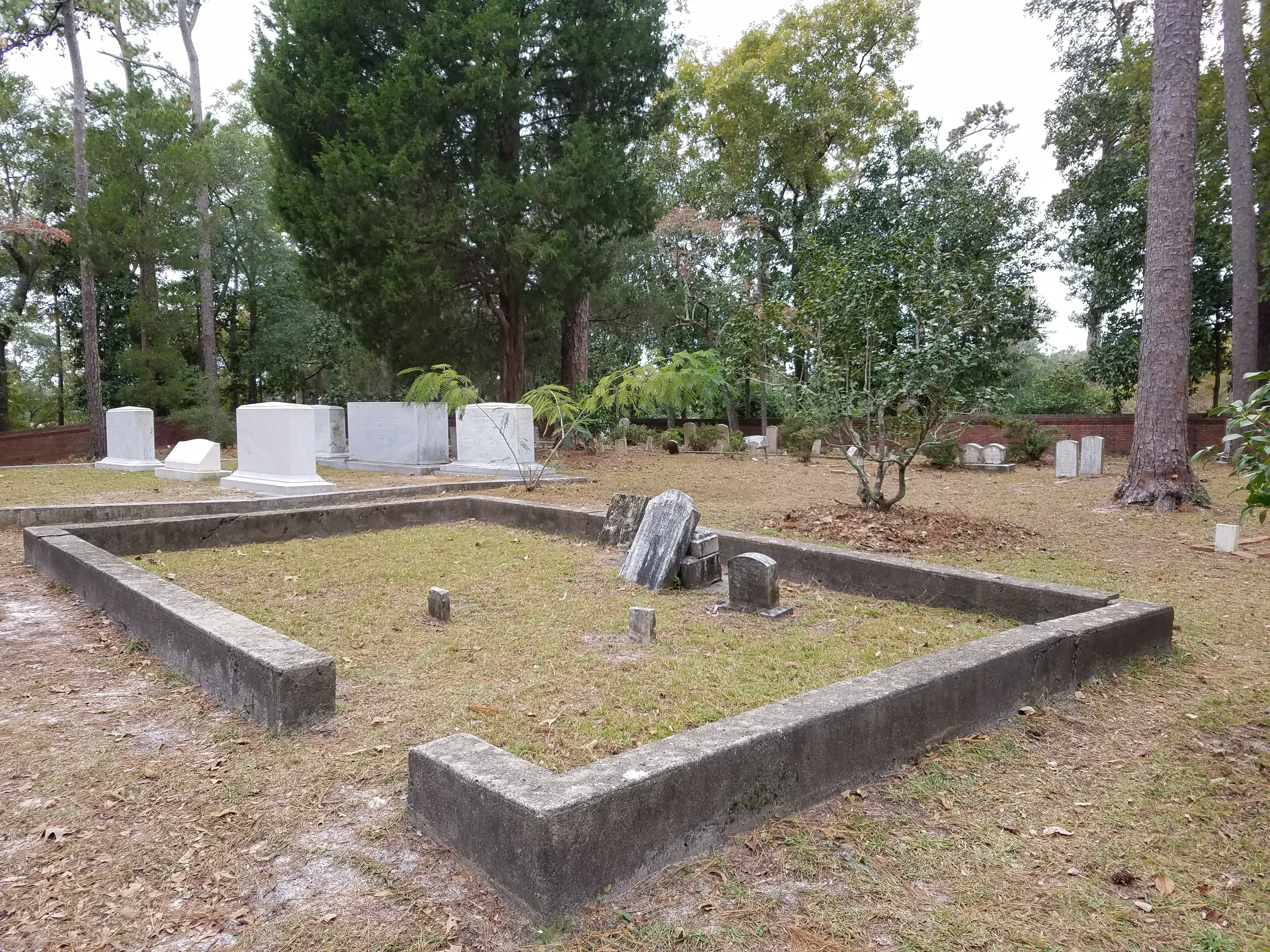
Mount Lebanon Cemetery

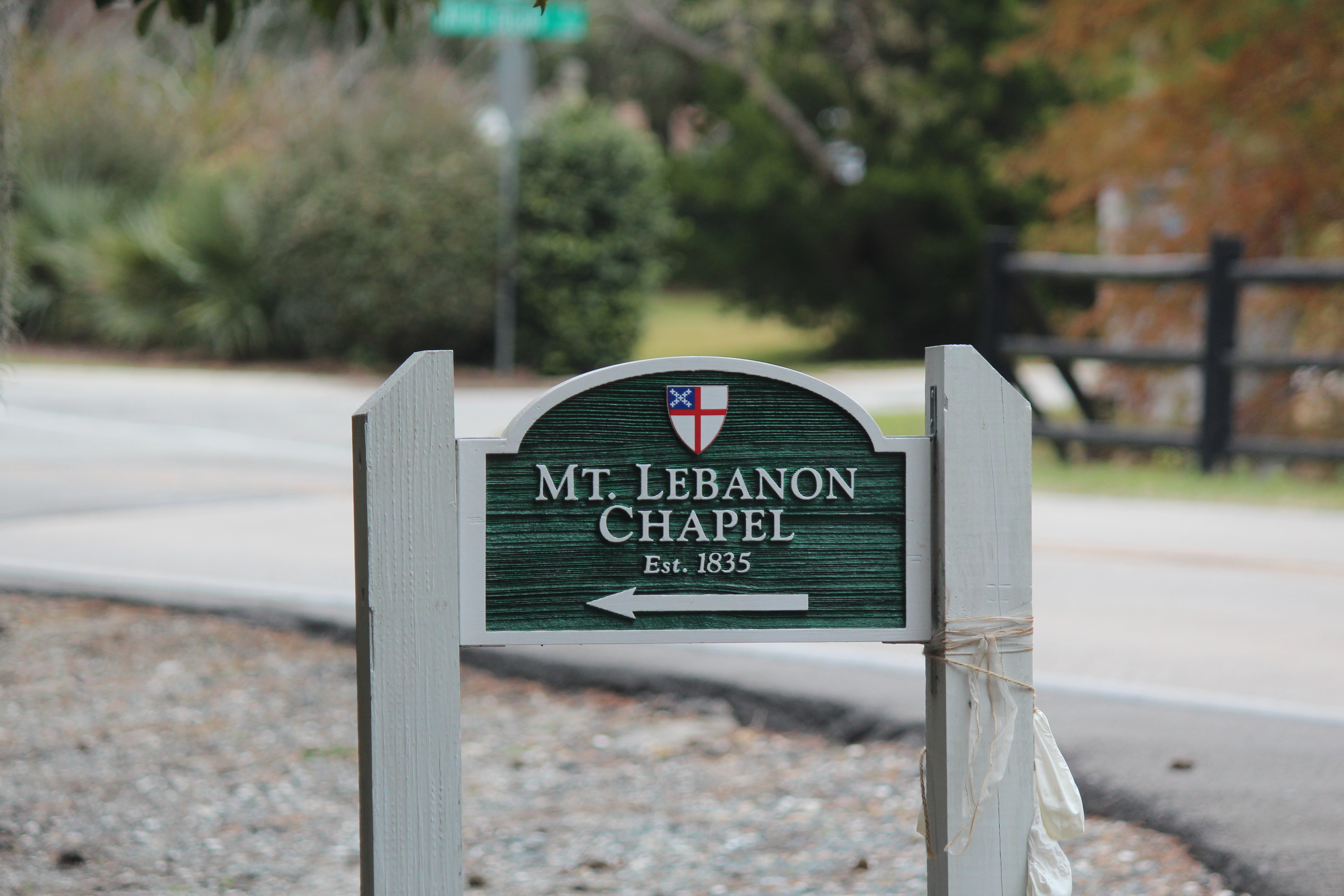
Sign at gated entrance

Mount Lebanon Chapel and Cemetery, also known as Lebanon Chapel, is a historic Episcopal chapel and cemetery located on the grounds of Airlie Gardens in Wilmington, North Carolina, United States. It was built about 1835, and is a one-story, three bay by three bay, gable-roofed, rectangular building in a vernacular Greco-Gothic. It measures 26 feet wide and 37 feet deep, and is sheathed in weatherboard. It was restored in 1974. It is the oldest known surviving church in New Hanover County.

It was listed on the National Register of Historic Places in 1986.
