= Oakdale Cemetery (Wilmington, North Carolina) =

Historic cemetery

Coordinates: 34.24461°N 77.93165°W

Oakdale Cemetery is a cemetery in Wilmington, North Carolina that dates from the 19th century.

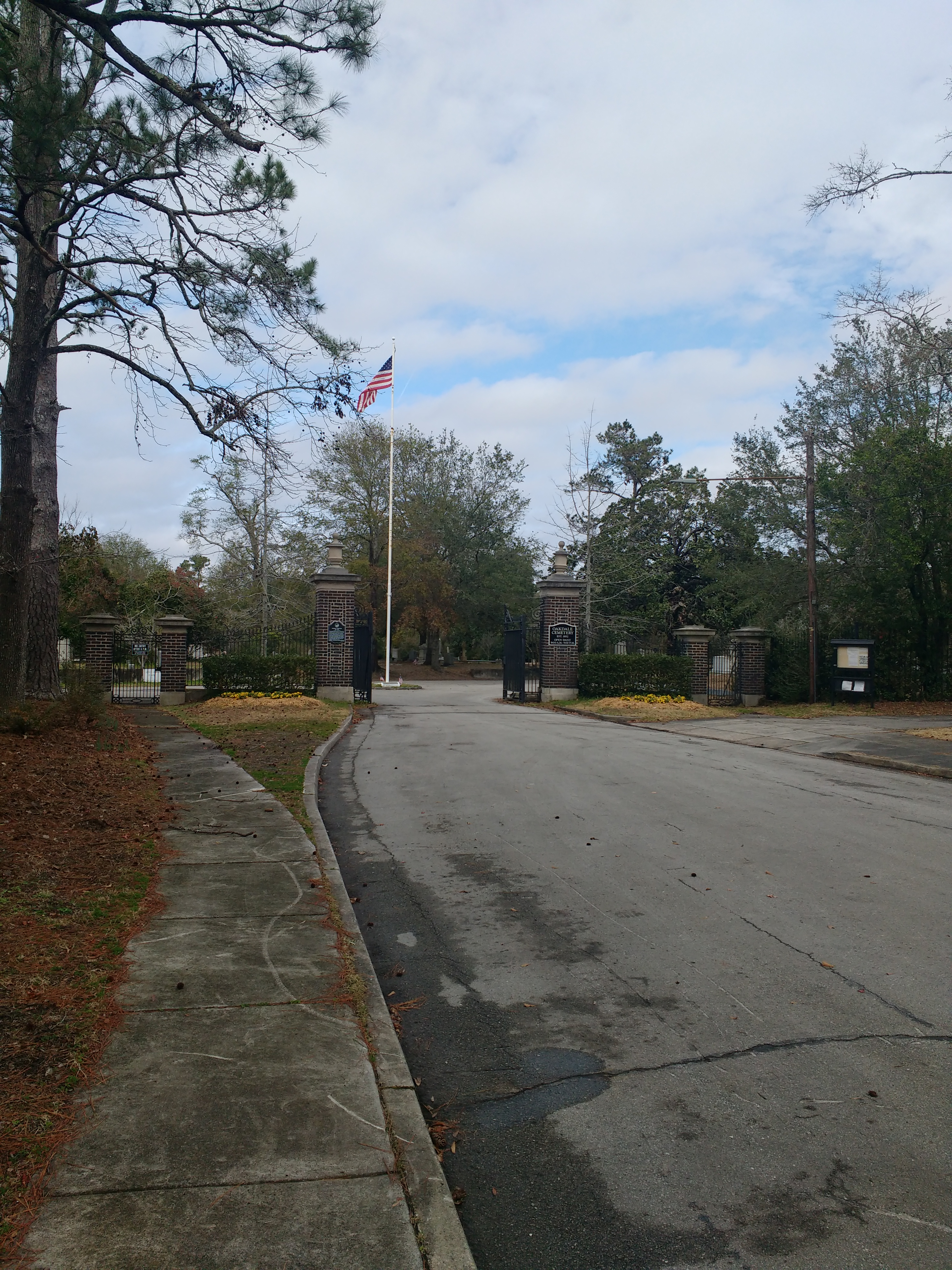
Entrance To Oakdale Cemetery

== History ==
Because existing cemeteries were becoming crowded, a group of citizens bought a 65-acre tract of land east of Burnt Mill Creek, east of the town limits. The first interment was Annie DeRosset, age 6, on February 5, 1855. Her father, John DeRosset, was a physician and the first president of the cemetery corporation.

== Specialized sections ==
The cemetery has an enclosed Hebrew Cemetery, dating from 1855, as well as a Masonic section, at least one section for Odd Fellows, a section where the burials formerly at Front Street Methodist Church were moved after an 1886 fire and a section for those with no other family.

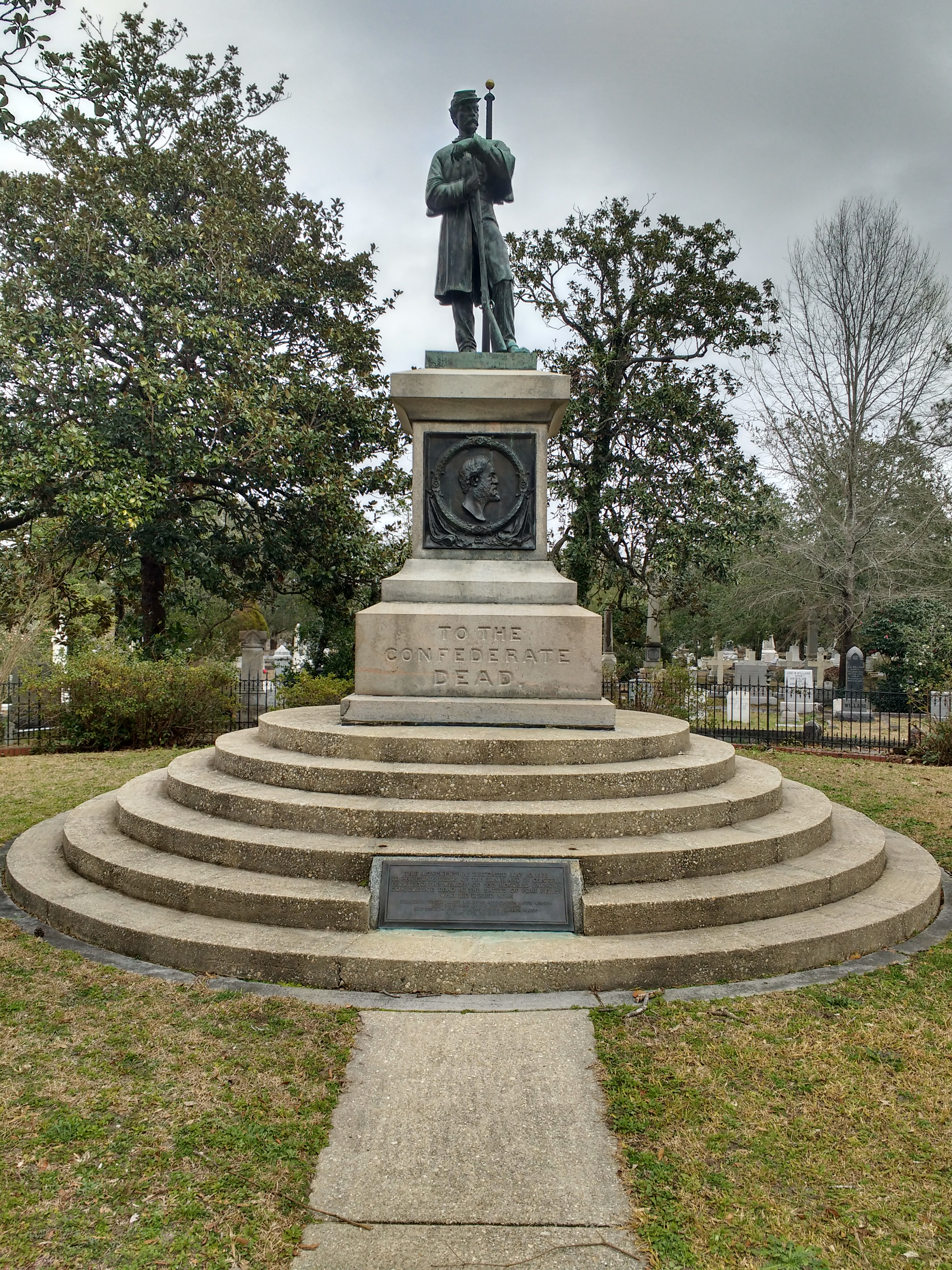
Confederate Soldier Memorial

== Confederate Memorial ==
Along with regular grave sites for Confederate soldiers, a great burial mound was erected by the United Daughters of the Confederacy for the dead Confederate soldiers from the Second Battle of Fort Fisher. Dedicated in 1872, a bronze statue of a regular soldier stands atop a large circular stone base. The dedication plaque reads,

"THIS MONUMENT WAS DEDICATED MAY 10, 1872 / TO PERPETUATE DEEDS OF THE BRAVE AND IN GRATEFUL / TRIBUTE TO THE MEMORY OF 550 HONORED UNKNOWN / CONFEDERATE DEAD AT THE BATTLE OF FORT FISHER / WHO LIE BURIED HERE / SPONSORED BY THE LADIES MEMORIAL ASSOCIATION LATER MERGED WITH DAUGHTERS OF THE CONFEDERACY / SELF DENIAL - WORK - PRAYERS - TEARS - HEARTS BLOOD / ENTERED INTO ITS BUILDING"

.

According to the University of North Carolina, as many as 367 unknown dead soldiers are buried under the mound.

== Notable burials ==
- Henry Bacon (1866–1924), architect
- John D. Barry (1839–1867), Confederate Army officer
- John D. Bellamy (1854-1942), member of U.S House of Representatives
- Mary Lily Kenan Flagler Bingham (1867–1917), heiress and philanthropist
- Arthur Bluethenthal (1891–1918), football player and member of the French Foreign Legion
- Ann Preston Bridgers (1891–1967), actress and playwright
- Robert Rufus Bridgers (1819-1888), member of Confederate House of Representatives
- David Brinkley (1920–2003), newscaster
- Elisabeth Chant (1865–1947), painter
- Thomas C. Darst (1875–1948), Episcopal bishop
- George Davis (1820–1896), Confederate senator and Confederate States Attorney General
- Adam Empie (1785–1860), Episcopal priest and President of the College of William & Mary
- Rose O'Neal Greenhow (1813–1864), socialite and Confederate spy
- Sarah Graham Kenan (1876–1968), heiress and philanthropist
- William Rand Kenan (1845–1903), Controller of the Port of Wilmington
- Alton Asa Lennon (1906-1986), U.S. Congressman and Senator
- William MacRae (1834–1882), Confederate Army officer
- Charles J. Mendelsohn (1880–1939), professor
- James Owen (1784–1865), U.S. Congressman
- Eliza Hall Nutt Parsley (1842–1920), founding president of the NC Division of the United Daughters of the Confederacy
- M. Warley Platzek (1854–1932), lawyer and New York Supreme Court Justice
- James F. Post (1818–1899), architect
- Thomas Settle (1865–1919), U.S. Congressman
- Francis Edwin Shober (1831–1896), U.S. Congressman
- Alfred Moore Waddell (1834-1912), member of U.S. House of Representatives
- Alfred A. Watson (1818–1905), Episcopal bishop
- William H.C. Whiting (1824–1865), Confederate Army officer
