= St. James Episcopal Church (Wilmington, North Carolina) =

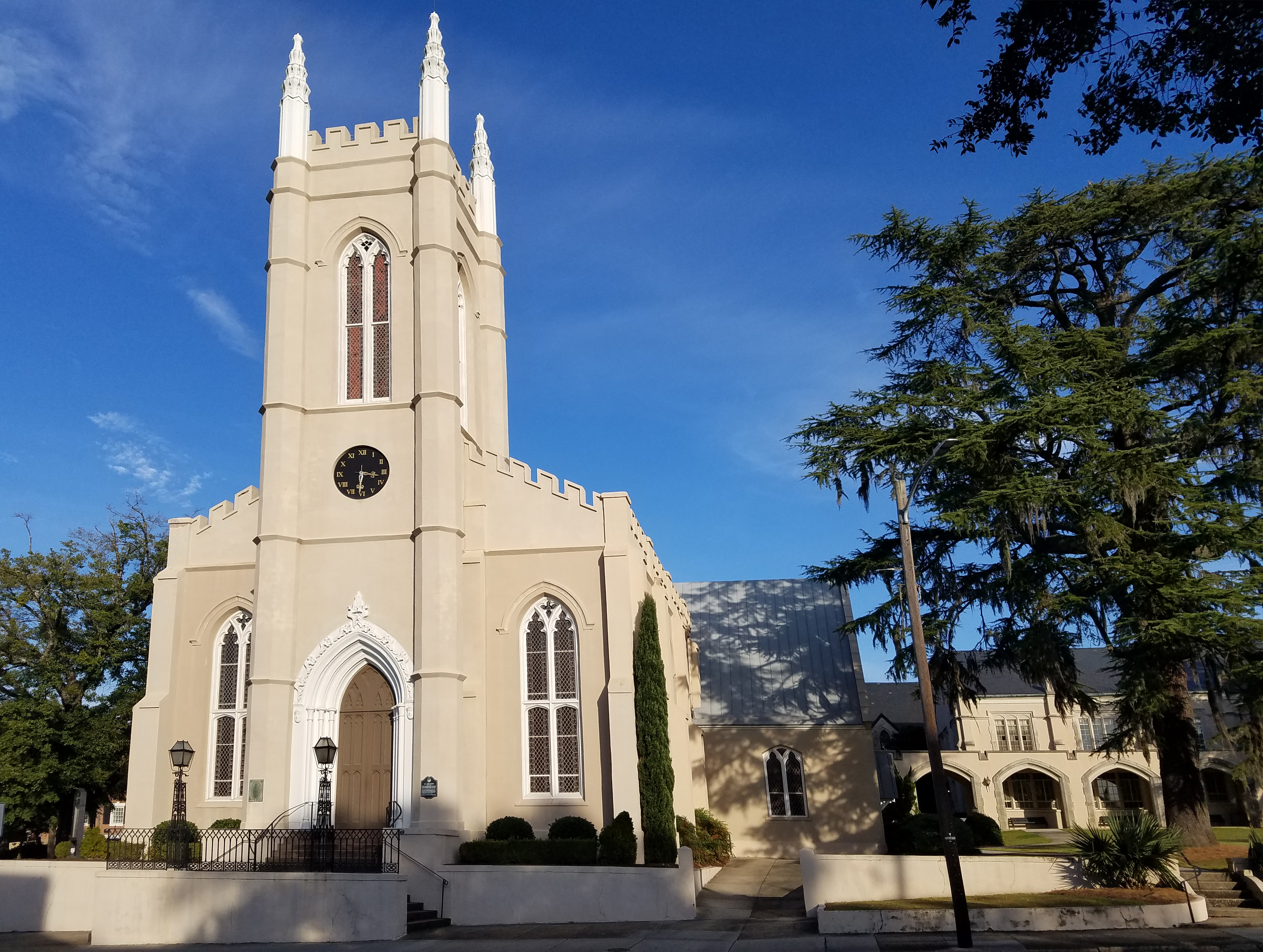

Religion
- Affiliation: Episcopal Church of the United States
- District: Episcopal Diocese of East Carolina
- Status: Active

Location
- Location: City of Wilmington; North Carolina; United States of America
- Interactive map of St. James Episcopal Church
- Coordinates: 34°14′7″N 77°56′44″W

Architecture
- Architects: John S. Norris, supervising architect (1839-1840); Thomas U. Walter, architect (1839-1840)
- Completed: 1839

Website
- http://www.stjamesp.org/

St. James Episcopal Church is a historic Episcopal church in the historic district of Wilmington, North Carolina. The church was originally chartered as part of the Church of England on November 27, 1729, and is one of the oldest continually active congregations in the state of North Carolina. St. James Parish is part of the Episcopal Diocese of East Carolina and is the oldest church in the city of Wilmington. It is a contributing building in the Wilmington Historic District.

The church reported 2,044 members in 2017 and 1,165 members in 2023; no membership statistics were reported in 2024 parochial reports. Plate and pledge income reported for the congregation in 2024 was $1,685,105. Average Sunday attendance (ASA) in 2024 was 358 persons.

== History ==
In 1701, the General Assembly of the colony of Carolina divided the provinces into Parishes and provided for the support of the clergy of the Church of England. Due to the slow development of the Cape Fear region, it was not until November 1729 that the Assembly established St. James Parish: "From the Haul Over between Little and New River Inlett and the Southernmost Boundary of the Province shall be and is hereby appointed a Separate and District parish by the name of St. James..."

The parishioners of St. James Parish worshipped in the New Hanover County Courthouse for over twenty years before the funds for the first building could be secured. The colonial church was finally open for worship in 1768.

For the 1839 church building, New York architect Henry C. Dudley (1813-1894) designed the truss roof in 1871 and the chancel and transept in 1885. Over his lifetime Dudley designed over 180 churches throughout the southern and eastern states.

In 1865, after federal troops captured Wilmington towards the conclusion of the American Civil War, the rector of the church refused to pray for U.S. President Abraham Lincoln. As a result, General Joseph R. Hawley ordered the building to be converted into a hospital. It was restored to church use in December.

== Church interior ==
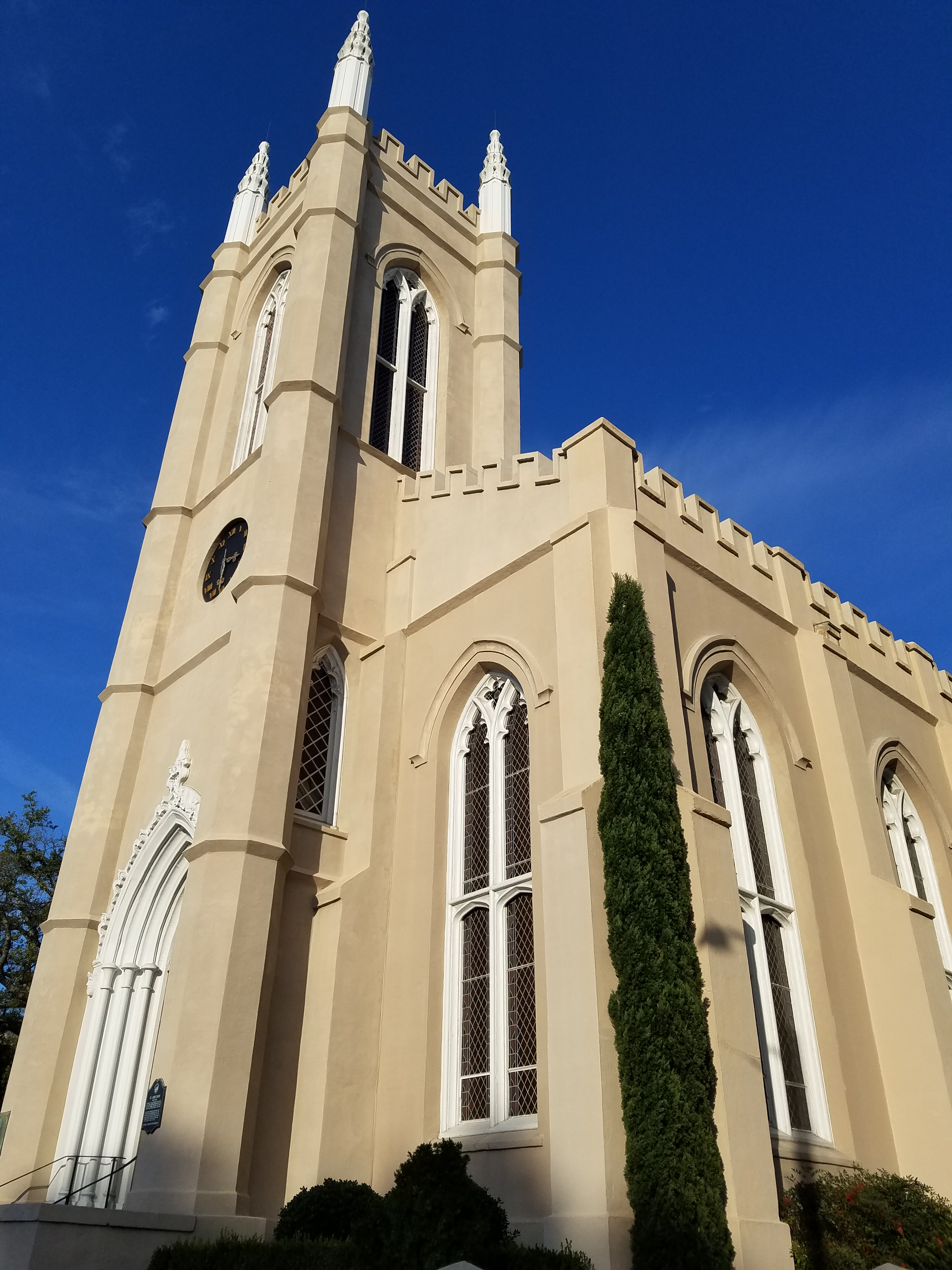
Closeup of church exterior

St. James Episcopal Church's oak altar and reredos were carved by Silas McBee, depicting the Nativity, Crucifixion, and Resurrection of Jesus. McBee also designed the Bishop's chair and two of the stained glass windows, including The Resurrection of Christ.

=== Ecce Homo ===
A painting of Christ was found in the captain's cabin of the Fortuna by scavengers when being salvaged. The painting turned out to have been done by Spanish artist Francisco Pacheco, and was named Ecce Homo, Latin for Behold the Man. The painting was given to St. James Episcopal Church in 1751, and still resides in the church.

== Notable burials ==
The historic graveyard at St. James has many notable burials. These burials include:

- Cornelius Harnett, American Revolutionary
- George Washington Glover, first husband of Mary Baker Eddy
- Grainger & Joshua Wright, Wrightsville Beach was named after their father Joshua Grainger Wright
- Robert Strange, Episcopal bishop
- Thomas Atkinson, Episcopal bishop
- Thomas H. Wright, Episcopal bishop and descendant of the family which owned what is now known as Airlie Gardens which includes the Mount Lebanon Chapel, the oldest church structure in New Hanover County which was commissioned built by his ancestral namesake.
- Elizabeth Brice, only daughter of Marmaduke Jones, Esq. who was a member of Royal Governor Arthur Dobbs's Council, and later Attorney General of NC.
- Samuel Townsend, Jr., older brother of Robert Townsend, member of the Culper Ring during the American Revolution.
