= Long Creek, North Carolina =

- Census-designated place
- Location within North Carolina Location within the United States
- Coordinates: 34°26′18″N 78°0′58″W
- Country: United States
- State: North Carolina
- County: Pender

Area
  - Total: 2.02 sq mi (5.22 km^{2})
  - Land: 2.01 sq mi (5.21 km^{2})
  - Water: 0.0039 sq mi (0.01 km^{2})
- Elevation: 20 ft (6.1 m)

Population (2020)
  - Total: 277
  - Density: 137.7/sq mi (53.18/km^{2})
- Time zone: UTC-5 (Eastern (EST))
  - Summer (DST): UTC-4 (EDT)
- ZIP Code: 28457 (Rocky Point)
- Area codes: 910, 472
- FIPS code: 37-39060
- GNIS feature ID: 2812800

Long Creek is an unincorporated community and census-designated place (CDP) in Pender County, North Carolina, United States. It was first listed as a CDP in the 2020 census with a population of 277.

The community is in southwestern Pender County, along North Carolina Highway 210. It is named for Long Creek, a southward-flowing stream that runs along the western edge of the community and leads southeast to the Northeast Cape Fear River. The community is 7 miles (11 km) west of Rocky Point, 10 miles (16 km) southwest of Burgaw, the Pender county seat, and 21 miles (34 km) north of Wilmington.

== Demographics ==
Historical population
Census	Pop.	Note	%±
2020	277		—
U.S. Decennial Census; 2020

=== 2020 census ===
Long Creek CDP, North Carolina – Demographic Profile (NH = Non-Hispanic)
Race / Ethnicity	Pop 2020	% 2020
White alone (NH)	121	43.68%
Black or African American alone (NH)	125	45.13%
Native American or Alaska Native alone (NH)	2	0.72%
Asian alone (NH)	1	0.36%
Pacific Islander alone (NH)	0	0.00%
Some Other Race alone (NH)	4	1.44%
Mixed Race/Multi-Racial (NH)	12	4.33%
Hispanic or Latino (any race)	12	4.33%
Total	277	100.00%

Note: the US Census treats Hispanic/Latino as an ethnic category. This table excludes Latinos from the racial categories and assigns them to a separate category. Hispanics/Latinos can be of any race.
