= Alfred A. Watson =

American bishop

The Right Reverend Alfred Augustin Watson D.D.
- Bishop of East Carolina
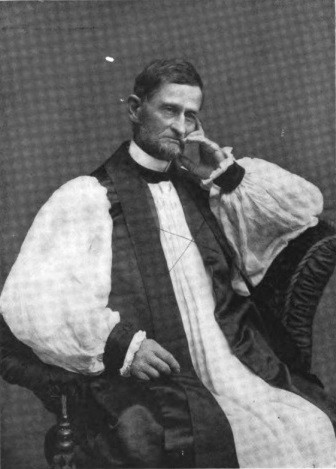
- Church: Episcopal Church
- Diocese: East Carolina
- Elected: December 13, 1883
- In office: 1884–1905
- Successor: Robert Strange

Orders
- Ordination: May 25, 1845 by Levi Silliman Ives
- Consecration: April 17, 1884 by William Mercer Green

Personal details
- Born: August 21, 1818 Brooklyn, New York City, New York, United States
- Died: April 21, 1905 (aged 86) Wilmington, North Carolina, United States
- Buried: Oakdale Cemetery (Wilmington, North Carolina)
- Denomination: Anglican
- Parents: Jesse Watson & Hannah Maria Tallman
- Spouse: Harriet Gold Halsey (m.1844, d.1847); Frances Hoffman Livingston (m.1849, d.1888); Mary Catherine Lord

Alfred Augustin Watson (August 21, 1818 – April 21, 1905) was first bishop of the Diocese of East Carolina in the Episcopal Church in the United States of America.

== Biography ==
Following education at New York University, he was ordained to the diaconate by Benjamin T. Onderdonk on November 3, 1844; and to the priesthood by Levi Silliman Ives on May 25, 1845. During the Civil War, he was chaplain to the Second Regiment of North Carolina State troops. At the time of his death, he was the oldest living bishop in the Episcopal Church, and the senior member of General Convention in order of service, having been first elected to the House of Deputies for North Carolina in 1850.

He was consecrated on April 17, 1884.

Bishop Watson married three times, and was survived by his third wife, Mary C. Watson (née Lord).
