= William MacRae =

Confederate States Army general (1834–1882)

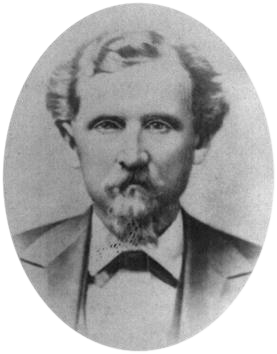
- Born: September 9, 1834; Wilmington, North Carolina
- Died: February 11, 1882 (aged 47); Augusta, Georgia
- Burial place: Oakdale Cemetery; Wilmington, North Carolina
- Military career
- Allegiance: Confederate States of America
- Branch: Confederate States Army
- Service years: 1861–1865
- Rank: Brigadier General
- Commands: Pettigrew-Kirkland-MacRae Brigade
- Conflicts: American Civil War: Peninsula Campaign; Second Manassas; Maryland Campaign; Battle of Antietam; Battle of Fredericksburg; Battle of Bristoe Station; Overland Campaign; Siege of Petersburg; Appomattox Campaign
- Other work: Railroad superintendent

William MacRae (September 9, 1834 – February 11, 1882) was a Confederate general who served during the American Civil War.

== Early life ==
William MacRae was born September 9, 1834, in Wilmington, NC a son of General Alexander MacRae and Anna Jane Martin MacRae. His family was descended from the clan MacRae, of Ross-shire, Scotland. MacRae was educated in civil engineering. He was working in the profession at Monroe, NC when the Civil War broke out.

== Civil War ==
MacRae enlisted as a private in the Monroe light infantry, and was elected captain when it became Company B, Fifteenth North Carolina infantry regiment. In April 1862, he was promoted to lieutenant colonel. During the Peninsula Campaign and at Second Manassas his regiment was a part of Howell Cobb's brigade. At the Battle of Antietam, MacRae commanded the brigade which had been reduced to 250 men during the fighting over the previous few weeks. MacRae's brigade repulsed three Union assaults but fell back when he had only 50 effectives remaining and his supply of ammunition was exhausted. At the Fredericksburg he fought with his regiment at Marye's Heights. Immediately following the battle the 15th North Carolina was transferred to Brigadier General John Rogers Cooke's North Carolina brigade. Cooke had been badly wounded at Fredericksburg and would not return to the brigade until April 1863. In February 1863, MacRae was promoted to colonel. This brigade served in North Carolina and southeast Virginia until after the Gettysburg campaign. in February, 1863, colonel, and in 1864 was commissioned brigadier-general. After rejoining the Army of Northern Virginia, MacRae was distinguished for valor at the Battle of Bristoe Station. After Brigadier General William Whedbee Kirkland was wounded at the Battle of Cold Harbor MacRae was temporarily promoted to the rank of brigadier general and was assigned to the command of Kirkland's brigade (this was also the former brigade of Brigadier General J. Johnston Pettigrew). At the Ream's Station MacRae's, Lane's, and Cooke's brigades drove John Gibbon's 2nd Division of Winfield Scott Hancock's II Corps from its entrenchments in their front and captured an artillery battery. After meritorious service at the Battle of Boydton Plank Road MacRae remained with the army through the Appomattox Campaign.

== Post War life ==
MacRae returned to North Carolina financially ruined. He became general superintendent of the Wilmington & Manchester Railroad. He took the same position with the Macon and Brunswick Railroad, and finally the Western & Atlantic Railroad.

== Death ==
MacRae contracted pneumonia and died at Augusta, Georgia. He is buried in his hometown of Wilmington, NC at Oakdale Cemetery.

== See also ==
- List of American Civil War generals (Confederate)
