= Anne Hodges-Copple =

Suffragan Bishop of Northern Carolina

The Right Reverend Anne Hodges-Copple
- Suffragan Bishop of North Carolina
- Church: Episcopal Church
- Diocese: North Carolina
- Elected: January 25, 2013
- In office: 2013–2022
- Predecessor: J. Gary Gloster
- Other posts: Bishop pro tempore of North Carolina (2015-2017); Assisting Bishop of the Episcopal Diocese of the Great Lakes 2025-present

Orders
- Ordination: 1988
- Consecration: June 15, 2013 by Katharine Jefferts Schori

Personal details
- Born: Anne Elliott Hodges Texas, United States
- Denomination: Anglican
- Spouse: John Hodges-Copple
- Children: 3
- Education: Duke University; Pacific School of Religion

Anne Elliott Hodges-Copple is an American Episcopal prelate. She served as the sixth Suffragan Bishop of North Carolina from 2013 to 2022.

== Biography ==
Anne graduated with a Bachelor of Arts from Duke University in 1979. After working as a community organizer for several years following graduation, she earned a Master of Divinity from Pacific School of Religion in 1984. She was ordained deacon in 1987 and priest in 1988, and served as assistant of St Luke's Church in Durham, North Carolina until 1992. She then became the Episcopal chaplain to Duke University until 2005, when she returned to St Luke's Church as rector.

Anne was elected on January 25, 2013, as Suffragan Bishop of North Carolina. She was consecrated as a bishop on June 15, 2013. From November 1, 2015, until July 15, 2017, she served as Bishop Pro Tempore of the Diocese of North Carolina, due to the resignation of Michael Bruce Curry to become the Presiding Bishop of the Episcopal Church. She returned to bishop suffragan upon the consecration of Samuel Sewall Rodman III as 12th Bishop Diocesan of North Carolina. Hodges-Copple is the first female bishop in the Diocese of North Carolina. On February 22, 2022 she announced her retirement as of December 2022.

On August 15, 2025, she joined the Episcopal Diocese of the Great Lakes as Assisting Bishop for the time before that diocese calls its first Bishop Diocesan.

== See also ==
- List of Episcopal bishops of the United States
- Historical list of the Episcopal bishops of the United States

Episcopal Church (USA) titles
Vacant Title last held by J. Gary Gloster	6th Bishop Suffragan of North Carolina; June 15, 2013 – Present	Incumbent
