= Robert Carroll Johnson Jr. =

American bishop

The Right Reverend Robert Carroll Johnson Jr. M.Div., M.A.
- Bishop of North Carolina
- Church: Episcopal Church
- Diocese: North Carolina
- Elected: December 4, 1993
- In office: 1994–2000
- Predecessor: Robert W. Estill
- Successor: Michael Curry

Orders
- Ordination: 1965 by Thomas Fraser
- Consecration: May 14, 1994 by Edmond L. Browning

Personal details
- Born: July 18, 1938 Columbus, Georgia, United States
- Died: January 3, 2014 (aged 75)
- Denomination: Anglican (prev. Baptist)
- Spouse: Connie Nevelle Smith (m. 1959)
- Children: 2

Robert Carroll Johnson Jr. (July 18, 1938 – January 3, 2014) was Bishop of the Episcopal Diocese of North Carolina from 1994 to 2000.

== Early life and education ==
Johnson was born on July 18, 1938, in Columbus, Georgia and was raised as a Southern Baptist. He was educated at Mercer College from where he earned a Bachelor of Arts in 1960. He also studied at Yale Divinity School and graduated with a Master of Divinity in 1964. He also received a Master of Arts from North Carolina State University in 1973.

== Ministry ==
Johnson was ordained as a Baptist minister but shortly later joined the Episcopal Church while in Yale and sought ordination. He was ordained deacon in 1964 by Bishop Richard H. Baker and priest in 1965 by Bishop Thomas Fraser of North Carolina. He served as assistant priest of St Peter's Church in Charlotte, North Carolina from 1964 till 1966. In 1966 he was appointed rector of St Paul's Church in Smithfield, North Carolina and in 1969 priest-in-charge of St Christopher's Church in Garner, North Carolina. In 1975 he became rector of St Luke's Church in Durham, North Carolina.

== Bishop ==
Johnson was elected Bishop of North Carolina on December 4, 1993, during a special convention held at the then conference centre of the Diocese in Browns Summit, North Carolina. He was consecrated bishop on May 14, 1994, by Presiding Bishop Edmond L. Browning in Duke Chapel. During his episcopacy he promoted the inclusion of all baptized Christians, including gay members. He was also vocal against racism and capital punishment. He was also a member of the Ecclesiastical Court which heard charges against Bishop Walter C. Righter after he ordained an openly lesbian priest. The charges were later dismissed. Johnson retired in 2000 and died in 2014.

Episcopal Church (USA) titles
Preceded by Robert W. Estill	10th Bishop of North Carolina; 1994-2000	Succeeded by Michael Bruce Curry
