= Richard H. Baker =

Richard H. Baker may refer to:

- Richard Baker (U.S. politician) (Richard Hugh Baker, born 1948), U.S. Representative from Louisiana
- Richard H. Baker (bishop) (1897–1981), Episcopal bishop of North Carolina
- Richard H. Baker, inventor of an electronic circuit called the "Baker clamp"
