= Huntington Williams Jr. =

Suffragan bishop of the Episcopal Diocese of North Carolina (1990-1996)

The Right Reverend Huntington Williams Jr. D.D.
- Suffragan Bishop of North Carolina
- Church: Episcopal Church
- Diocese: North Carolina
- Elected: 1990
- In office: 1990–1996
- Predecessor: Frank Vest
- Successor: J. Gary Gloster

Orders
- Ordination: January 1953 by Noble C. Powell
- Consecration: April 28, 1990 by Edmond L. Browning

Personal details
- Born: October 27, 1925 Albany, New York, United States
- Died: January 28, 2013 (aged 87) Charlotte, North Carolina, United States
- Denomination: Anglican
- Parents: Huntington Williams MD & Mary Camilla McKim
- Spouse: Mary Comer Britton
- Children: 4, including Huntington Williams III

Huntington Williams Jr. (October 27, 1925 – January 28, 2013) was suffragan bishop of the Episcopal Diocese of North Carolina from 1990 to 1996.

== Early life and education ==
Williams was born on October 27, 1925, in Albany, New York, the son of Huntington Williams, a doctor and future Baltimore Health Commissioner, and Mary Camilla McKim. He was educated at Calvert School and Gilman School, before matriculating at Harvard College in 1943. He then served with the 87th Infantry Division during World War II, notably during the Battle of the Bulge. He was also involved in the liberation of Buchenwald concentration camp. After the war, he was awarded the Bronze Star Medal and Combat Infantryman Badge. He returned to Harvard and graduated with a Bachelor of Arts in 1949. Afterwards, he enrolled at the Virginia Theological Seminary and graduated with a Master of Divinity in 1952.

== Personal life ==
He is the grandson of George Huntington Williams, who was a mineralogist, petrologist, and Professor of Geology at Johns Hopkins University. He is the great-grandson of Daniel P. Wood who was an American lawyer and politician from New York.

He is the great-grandson of Robert Stanton Williams (and Abigail Obear Doolittle Williams) who became President of Oneida National Bank in 1886 and helped found the Utica Public Library in 1893.

Williams is related to Talcott Williams and Samuel Wells Williams.

He is the great-great grandson of William Williams who served in the War of 1812 and was a publisher and journalist.

His great-great grandfather, John McKim, founded McKim's Free School. Another great-great grandfather is Reverdy Johnson.

Williams's father in-law, Sydney William Britton, was a British doctor and his mother in-law, Louise Weibel Britton, was the first female receipt of a higher law degree at McGill University.

Williams's son, Huntington Williams III, is the former president of Merit Network, Inc., and previously served as the CEO of Community of Science Inc.

Williams's granddaughter, Caroline Grace Williams, was nominated NCAA Woman of the Year.

== Ordained ministry ==
Williams was ordained deacon in June 1952, and priest in January 1953 by Bishop Noble C. Powell of Maryland. His first post, in 1952, was as curate at St Thomas' Church in Owings Mills, Maryland, before becoming assistant at St George's Church in New York City in 1954. Between 1956 and 1963, he served as rector of St Timothy's Church in Winston-Salem, North Carolina, and between 1963 and 1990 served as rector of St Peter's Church in Charlotte, North Carolina.

== Episcopacy ==
Williams was elected Suffragan Bishop of North Carolina in 1990 and was consecrated on April 28, 1990, with Presiding Bishop Edmond L. Browning as chief consecrator, in Duke Chapel. He retired in February 1996. Williams died on January 28, 2013, at The Stewart Health Centre of The Cypress in Charlotte, North Carolina.

Episcopal Church (USA) titles
| Preceded by Frank Vest | 4th Bishop Suffragan of North Carolina; 1990–1996 | Succeeded by J. Gary Gloster |
