= Jane Renwick Smedburg Wilkes =

American civic leader

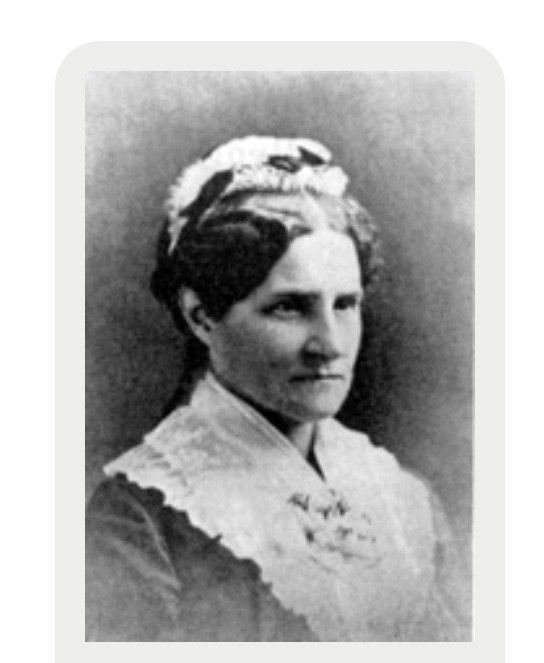
- Born: Jane Renwick Smedburg; November 22, 1827; New York City, New York, U.S.
- Died: January 19, 1913 (aged 85); Charlotte, North Carolina, U.S.
- Resting place: Elmwood Cemetery
- Occupation: nurse
- Known for: Founding hospitals
- Spouse: John Wilkes
- Children: 9
- Parent(s): Carl Gustav Smedburg; Isabelle Renwick

Jane Renwick Smedburg Wilkes (November 22, 1827 – January 19, 1913) was an American nurse and civic leader. She was a Confederate nurse during the American Civil War, volunteering at Wayside Hospital and the Confederate Military Hospital in Charlotte, North Carolina. After the war, Wilkes served on the Woman's Auxiliary to the Board of Missions of the Episcopal Church and as president of the Women's Aid Society of St. Peter's Episcopal Church. In 1867, she co-founded St. Peter's Hospital, the first civilian hospital in North Carolina. Like other hospitals in segregated North Carolina, St. Peter's didn't admit Black people. In 1892, she opened Good Samaritan Hospital, the first hospital for African-Americans in North Carolina.

== Early life ==
Wilkes was born Jane Renwick Smedburg on November 22, 1827, in New York City to Carl Gustav Smedburg, a wealthy Swedish merchant, and Isabelle Renwick Smedberg, of English and Scottish parentage. She was the seventh of thirteen children. Her family accumulated a large fortune through her father's shipping business. She grew up on her family's estate in the Catskill Mountains, where the family employed many servants including maids, cooks, gardeners, and governesses. She was reared by governesses until she began school at the age of four. Wilkes was raised in the Presbyterian Church.

== Nursing and charities ==
During the American Civil War, Wilkes was one of the first women volunteers to nurse sick and wounded Confederate soldiers at the Wayside Hospital and the Confederate Military Hospital in Charlotte. Wilkes and the other women volunteers formed the Ladies Hospital Association to provide volunteer nurses at the Confederate hospitals. She helped establish two hospitals in Charlotte, St. Peter's Hospital and the Good Samaritan Hospital, serving on the board of managers for the former. She pushed for the creation of a hospital, suggesting the need for one through the Episcopal Diocese of North Carolina's Church Aid Society. In 1876, while serving as president of the Women's Aid Society of St. Peter's Episcopal Church, she led the effort to establish the Charlotte Home and Hospital, later renamed St. Peter's Hospital, which was the first civilian hospital in North Carolina. The building she secured for the hospital was a two-room structure on East 7th Street. Wilkes kept records of religious affiliation, diagnosis, surgical procedures as well as method of payment for all patients. She opened a nursing school at St. Peter's in 1899. She served as secretary, treasurer, and president of the hospital. As was the law at the time, St. Peter's Hospital and School of Nursing served exclusively the white citizens of Charlotte. Wilkes, who saw a need for a hospital for the Black community, spearheaded a fundraiser in 1892 to open Good Samaritan Hospital. Good Samaritan Hospital opened later that year, and opened a nursing school for Black women in 1902. Good Samaritan was the first hospital for African-Americans in North Carolina.

She was active in church societies and charities, including the Episcopal Churchwomen and the Woman's Auxiliary to the Board of Missions of the Episcopal Church, serving as the executive secretary of the latter's chapter in the North Carolina Diocese from 1882 to 1895. In 1906, she was appointed as "Permanent President" of the organization, having previously served as president from 1904, and continued in the role until 1909. She previously served as the Auxiliary's honorary secretary in 1897.

She was also involved in the founding of Charlotte's first orphanage, the Thompson Children's Home.

Wilkes was an active member of the Ladies' Memorial Association and the Stonewall Jackson Chapter of the United Daughters of the Confederacy. On June 3, 1910, she helped place the United Daughters of the Confederacy historical plaque to mark the Confederate Navy Yard.

== Personal life ==
She married her first cousin, Captain John Wilkes, on 20 April 1854. Her husband was the son of her mother's sister, Jane Jeffrey Renwick Wilkes. She and her husband first lived near St. Catharine's Mill, in Mecklenburg County, until the 1870s, when they moved to West Trade Street in Charlotte. They had nine children: Charles, Jeanie Jeffrey, Rosalie, Agnes, John Frank, Paul, Eliza Isabella, James Renwick, and Isabella. Her husband owned and managed a flour mill, an iron mill, and a cotton mill.

The Wilkes enslaved over thirty people, most of whom worked in their mills. When the American Civil War began in 1861, Wilkes and her family supported the Confederacy although two of her brothers fought for the Union Army and her father-in-law provided money and supplies for the Union cause.

Upon her marriage, Wilkes joined the Episcopal Church and was a parishioner at St. John's Episcopal Church in High Shoals. When the family moved to Charlotte, they joined St. Peter's Episcopal Church.

Wilkes died at her home on January 19, 1913. Her funeral, held the following day at St. Peter's Episcopal Church, was conducted by The Right Reverend Joseph Blount Cheshire, Bishop of the Episcopal Diocese of North Carolina. She was buried in Elmwood Cemetery.

== Legacy ==
A 7.5 foot-tall statue of Wilkes, weighing 800 pounds, was installed on East Morehead Street in Charlotte in 2014. A historical marker for Good Samaritan Hospital mentioning Wilkes and her contributions was also erected in Charlotte.
