= St. Timothy's Church =

St. Timothy's Church may refer to:

== Italy ==
- San Timoteo, Rome

== United States ==
- St. Timothy Catholic Church (Los Angeles), California
- St. Timothy's Protestant Episcopal Church, Massillon, Ohio
- St. Timothy's Episcopal Church, Roxborough, Philadelphia, Pennsylvania
- St. Timothy's Episcopal Church (Winston-Salem), North Carolina
