= Episcopal Diocese of North Carolina =

Episcopal Church diocese in the US

Diocese of North Carolina
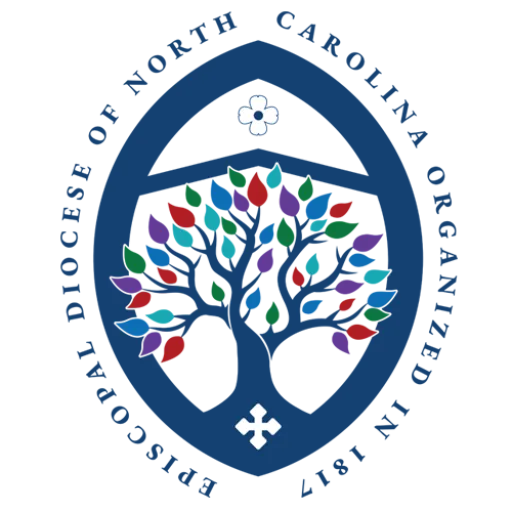

Location
- Country: United States
- Ecclesiastical province: Province IV

Statistics
- Congregations: 106 (2024)
- Members: 41,779 (2023)

Information
- Denomination: Episcopal Church
- Established: April 24, 1817

Current leadership
- Bishop: Samuel Sewall Rodman III
- Assistant bishop: Jennifer Brooke-Davidson

Map
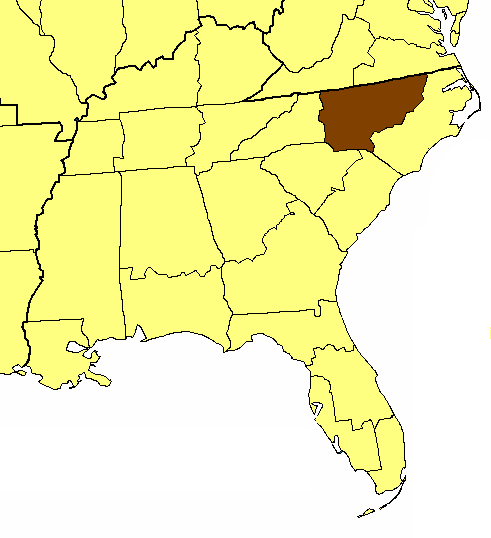
- Location of the Diocese of North Carolina

Website
- www.episdionc.org

The Episcopal Diocese of North Carolina is a diocese of the Episcopal Church within Province IV that encompasses central North Carolina. Founded in 1817, the modern boundaries of the diocese roughly correspond to the portion of North Carolina between I-77 in the west and I-95 in the east, including the most populous area of the state. Raleigh, Charlotte, Winston-Salem, Greensboro, and Durham are the largest cities in the diocese. The diocese originally covered the entirety of the state, until the Diocese of East Carolina which stretches to the Atlantic was formed in 1883, and the Diocese of Western North Carolina which lies to the west extending into the Appalachian Mountains was formed in 1922 (Note: While the Diocese of Western North Carolina was not formed until 1922, the Diocese of North Carolina offered the territory of the western part of the state to the general Episcopal Church to act as a missionary district, and therefore did not manage the west after 1894.).

In 2024, the diocese reported average Sunday attendance (ASA) of 10,517 persons, down from 13,890 in 2015. No membership statistics were reported in 2024 national parochial reports. Public membership figures cited a decrease in membership from 49,900 in 2016 to 41,779 in 2023. The congregations of the diocese had $46,771,823 in plate and pledge income in 2024.

== About the Diocese ==
The diocese has no cathedral. (Note: The Church of the Good Shepherd in Raleigh was named the pro-cathedral of the diocese in the mid-1890s, but was never raised to full cathedral status at a diocesan convention. It has continued to perform many of the traditional functions of a cathedral in the years since.) Its offices are located in the state capital of Raleigh. Representatives of the diocese's 106 parishes meet annually at a diocesan convention in November. Between conventions, the diocese is administered by a Diocesan Council and diocesan staff who work under the bishop.

The current diocesan bishop is Samuel Sewall Rodman III. He was consecrated bishop on July 15, 2017, as the twelfth bishop of the Diocese of North Carolina, after the election of his predecessor, Michael Bruce Curry, as Presiding Bishop of the Episcopal Church. The assistant bishop of the diocese is Jennifer Brooke-Davidson. The bishop suffragan of the diocese, Anne Hodges-Copple, retired in December 2022.

Other bishops who have served the diocese since 1980 are the late Robert W. Estill (ninth bishop of the diocese), the late Robert C. Johnson (tenth bishop of the diocese), the late Frank Vest (suffragan bishop of the diocese who subsequently became bishop of the Episcopal Diocese of Southern Virginia), the late Huntington Williams, Jr. (retired suffragan bishop), J. Gary Gloster (retired suffragan bishop), William Gregg (retired assistant bishop and previously the bishop of the Episcopal Diocese of Eastern Oregon), the late Alfred C. Marble, Jr. (retired assisting bishop and previously the bishop of the Episcopal Diocese of Mississippi), and the late Peter James Lee (formerly provisional bishop of the Episcopal Diocese of East Carolina and bishop of the Episcopal Diocese of Virginia).

Congregations in the diocese vary from conservative to liberal and from low church to high church, but the diocese itself is generally considered moderate and is highly supportive of the Episcopal Church. The density of Episcopalians varies across the diocese but is highest in Wake County, the county of the state capital, Raleigh.

=== Programs and institutions ===
Principal programs of the diocese include campus ministries and social ministries:

- Campus ministry (at North Carolina State University, St. Augustine's University, Duke University, Elon University, the University of North Carolina at Chapel Hill, the University of North Carolina at Greensboro, the University of North Carolina at Charlotte, Wake Forest University, and Davidson College). In 2019, the diocesan programming extended to digital ministry with the launch of a smartphone app for young adults titled YEAH: Young Episcopal Adult Hub.
- Social ministry, notably the Episcopal Farmworkers Ministry in Newton Grove, a joint venture with the Diocese of East Carolina. In a state with a growing Latino population, the diocese supports a Chartered Committee on Hispanic Ministry. The committee provides liturgical and pastoral resources, supports congregations' service and outreach among Latinas and Latinos, and advocates for immigration reform and other laws to protect the rights of migrant workers.

The diocese no longer operates a camp and conference center, having sold its facility near Browns Summit, North Carolina to the State of North Carolina for use as Haw River State Park. However, the diocese maintains an active youth program. The territory of the diocese includes independent schools with current or former diocesan affiliations including Trinity Episcopal School and Palisades Episcopal School in Charlotte, Canterbury School in Greensboro, and St. Mary's School, St. Timothy's School, St. David's School, and Ravenscroft School in Raleigh.

Other major institutions affiliated with the diocese are Penick Village in Southern Pines, a retirement community; and Thompson Child and Family Focus in Charlotte, a youth services ministry.

The diocese used to operate St. Peter's Hospital and Good Samaritan Hospital in Charlotte, both founded by Jane Renwick Smedburg Wilkes, who served as President of the Diocese's Women's Aid Society.

== Bishops ==
Bishops of the Episcopal Diocese of North Carolina
From	Until	Name	Title	Notes
1823	1830	John Stark Ravenscroft	1st bishop of North Carolina	
1831	1852	Levi Silliman Ives	2nd bishop of North Carolina	
1853	1881	Thomas Atkinson	3rd bishop of North Carolina	
1873	1881	Theodore B. Lyman	Coadjutor bishop of North Carolina	
1881	1893	Theodore B. Lyman	4th bishop of North Carolina	
1893	1893	Joseph Blount Cheshire	Coadjutor bishop of North Carolina	
1893	1932	Joseph Blount Cheshire	5th bishop of North Carolina	
1918	1928	Henry Beard Delany	1st bishop suffragan of North Carolina	
1922	1932	Edwin Anderson Penick	Bishop coadjutor of North Carolina	
1932	1959	Edwin Anderson Penick	6th bishop of North Carolina	
1951	1959	Richard Henry Baker	Bishop coadjutor of North Carolina	
1959	1965	Richard Henry Baker	7th bishop of North Carolina	
1960	1965	Thomas Fraser	Bishop coadjutor of North Carolina	
1965	1983	Thomas Fraser	8th bishop of North Carolina	
1967	1975	Moultrie Moore	2nd bishop suffragan of North Carolina	Bishop of Easton, (1975–1983)
1980	1982	Robert Whitridge Estill	Bishop coadjutor of North Carolina	
1983	1994	Robert Whitridge Estill	9th bishop of North Carolina	
1985	1989	Frank Vest	3rd bishop suffragan of North Carolina	Bishop of Southern Virginia (1991–1998)
1990	1996	Huntington Williams, Jr.	4th bishop suffragan of North Carolina	
1994	2000	Robert C. Johnson Jr.	10th bishop of North Carolina	
1996	2007	J. Gary Gloster	5th bishop suffragan of North Carolina	
2000	2015	Michael Bruce Curry	11th bishop of North Carolina	27th Presiding Bishop of The Episcopal Church (2015 – 2024)
2005	2013	Alfred C. "Chip" Marble, Jr.	Assisting bishop of North Carolina	Bishop of Mississippi (1993–2003)
2007	2013	William O. Gregg	Assistant bishop of North Carolina	Bishop of Eastern Oregon (2000–2007)
2013	2022	Anne Hodges-Copple	6th bishop suffragan of North Carolina	The first female bishop in the Diocese of North Carolina.
2015	2017	Anne Hodges-Copple	Bishop pro tempore of North Carolina	The first female bishop in the Diocese of North Carolina.
2015	2017	Peter Lee	Assisting bishop of North Carolina	Bishop of Virginia (1985–2009); bishop provisional of East Carolina (2013–2015) Lee was brought in as a temporary bishop of North Carolina after Bishop Michael Curry was called to serve as Presiding Bishop of the Episcopal Church. Lee served until Samuel S. Rodman, III was consecrated in April 2017.
2017	Present	Samuel S. Rodman, III	12th bishop of North Carolina	
2022	Present	Jennifer Brooke-Davidson	Assistant bishop of North Carolina	6th bishop suffragan of West Texas (2017–2019); assistant bishop of Virginia (2019–2022)
