= Thomas Atkinson (bishop) =

American bishop (1807–1881)

The Right Reverend Thomas Atkinson S.T.D., LL.D.
- Bishop of North Carolina
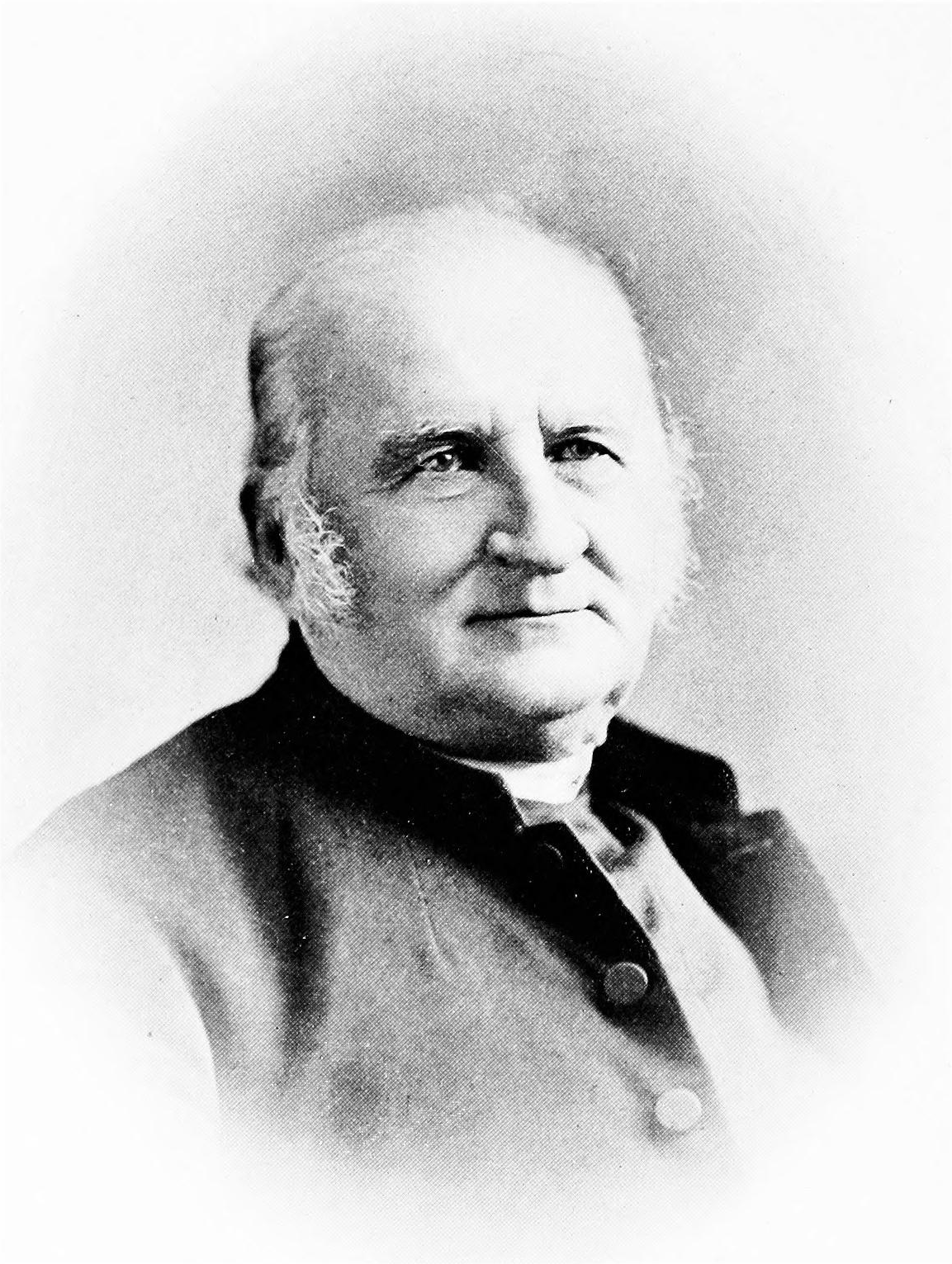
- Church: Episcopal Church
- Diocese: North Carolina
- Elected: May 28, 1853
- In office: 1853–1881
- Predecessor: Levi Silliman Ives
- Successor: Theodore B. Lyman

Orders
- Ordination: May 7, 1837 by Richard Channing Moore
- Consecration: October 17, 1853 by: Thomas Church Brownell; Charles Pettit McIlvaine; George Washington Doane; James Hervey Otey; George Trevor Spencer; John Medley

Personal details
- Born: August 6, 1807 Dinwiddie County, Virginia, United States
- Died: January 4, 1881 (aged 73) Wilmington, North Carolina, United States
- Buried: St. James Episcopal Church (Wilmington, North Carolina)
- Denomination: Anglican
- Parents: Robert Atkinson & Mary Tabb Mayo Atkinson
- Spouse: Josepha Gwinn Wilder
- Children: Mary Mayo Atkinson; John Wilder Atkinson; Robert Atkinson
- Education: Hampden-Sydney College

Thomas Atkinson (August 6, 1807 – January 4, 1881) was the third Episcopal Bishop of North Carolina.

== Early life ==
Atkinson was born in Dinwiddie County, Virginia, the son of Robert Atkinson and Mary Tabb Mayo Atkinson. He attended Yale University and Hampden-Sydney College, graduating from the latter in 1825. Upon graduation, he studied law under Judge Henry St. George Tucker at Winchester Law School and practiced law for eight years before turning to theology. In January 1828, he married Josepha Gwinn Wilder, with whom he had three children.

== Parish ministry ==
Atkinson was ordained deacon by the Rt. Rev. William Meade on November 18, 1836, and ordained priest the following year. As deacon, Atkinson served as assistant minister at Christ Church in Norfolk, Virginia. After his ordination to the priesthood, he became rector of St. Paul's Church in Norfolk. In 1839, he moved to Lynchburg to become rector of St. Paul's Church in that town, remaining there for five years.

In 1843, Atkinson moved again, to Maryland, where he became the rector of St. Peter's Church in Baltimore. In 1843 and 1846, he was elected bishop of Indiana, declining the honor both times. In 1852, he became rector of Grace Church in the same city, a new parish organized, in part, by members of St. Peter's.

== Bishop of North Carolina ==
Atkinson was elected Bishop of North Carolina on May 28, 1853, following the resignation of Bishop Ives in December the previous year. He was consecrated on October 17, 1853, by Bishops Thomas Church Brownell, Charles Pettit McIlvaine, George Washington Doane, James Hervey Otey, George Trevor Spencer, and John Medley. Atkinson became the 58th bishop in the Episcopal Church. As bishop, Atkinson founded a church school for boys in Raleigh and the Ravenscroft School in Asheville. He urged the religious instruction of slaves. Initially opposing secession, after the American Civil War began, Bishop Atkinson affiliated with the Protestant Episcopal Church in the Confederate States of America.

After the war, in 1866, Atkinson recommended placing the operation of black Episcopal churches fully in the hands of black clergymen, and the Diocesan Convention passed a series of resolutions doing so. Two years later, he opened the Episcopal school for blacks near Raleigh that eventually became St. Augustine's College. In 1867, he attended the first Lambeth Conference at Lambeth Palace. As his health declined, Atkinson requested the election of an assistant bishop, and Theodore Benedict Lyman was elected to that position in 1873. Atkinson died on January 4, 1881, at his home in Wilmington; he was buried on January 7 within St. James Episcopal Church in Wilmington, North Carolina.

The Episcopal Church of the Holy Comforter in Charlotte is the memorial church of Bishop Thomas Atkinson.

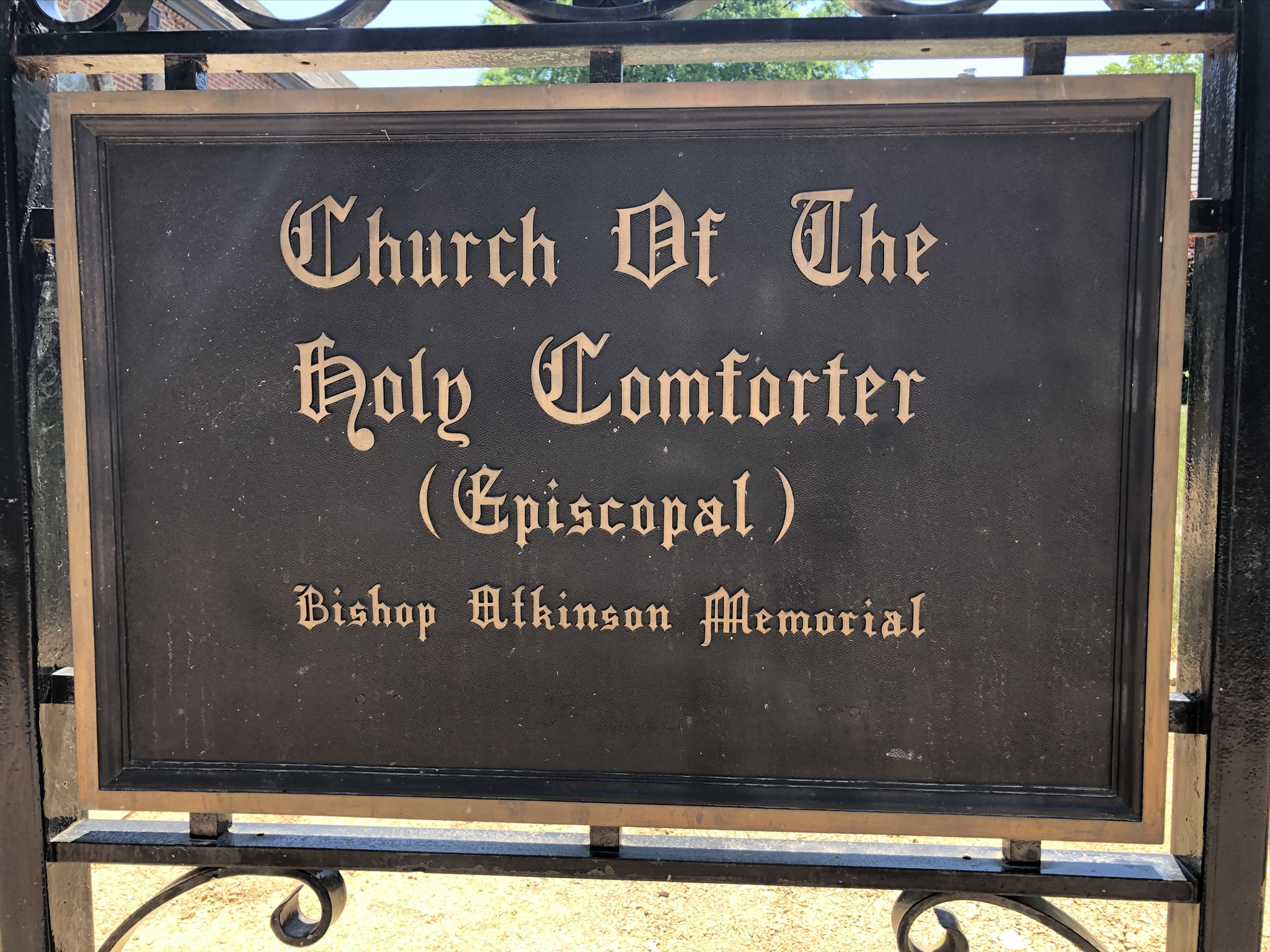
This plaque stands at the head of the memorial garden at the Church of the Holy Comforter in Charlotte, North Carolina. This church was consecrated as the memorial church for Bishop Thomas Atkinson in 1903.

== Notes ==
Episcopal Church (USA) titles
Preceded by Levi Silliman Ives	3rd Bishop of North Carolina; 1853–1881	Succeeded by Theodore B. Lyman
