= Cameron Park Historic District =

Historic district in North Carolina, United States

- Cameron Park
- U.S. National Register of Historic Places
- U.S. Historic district
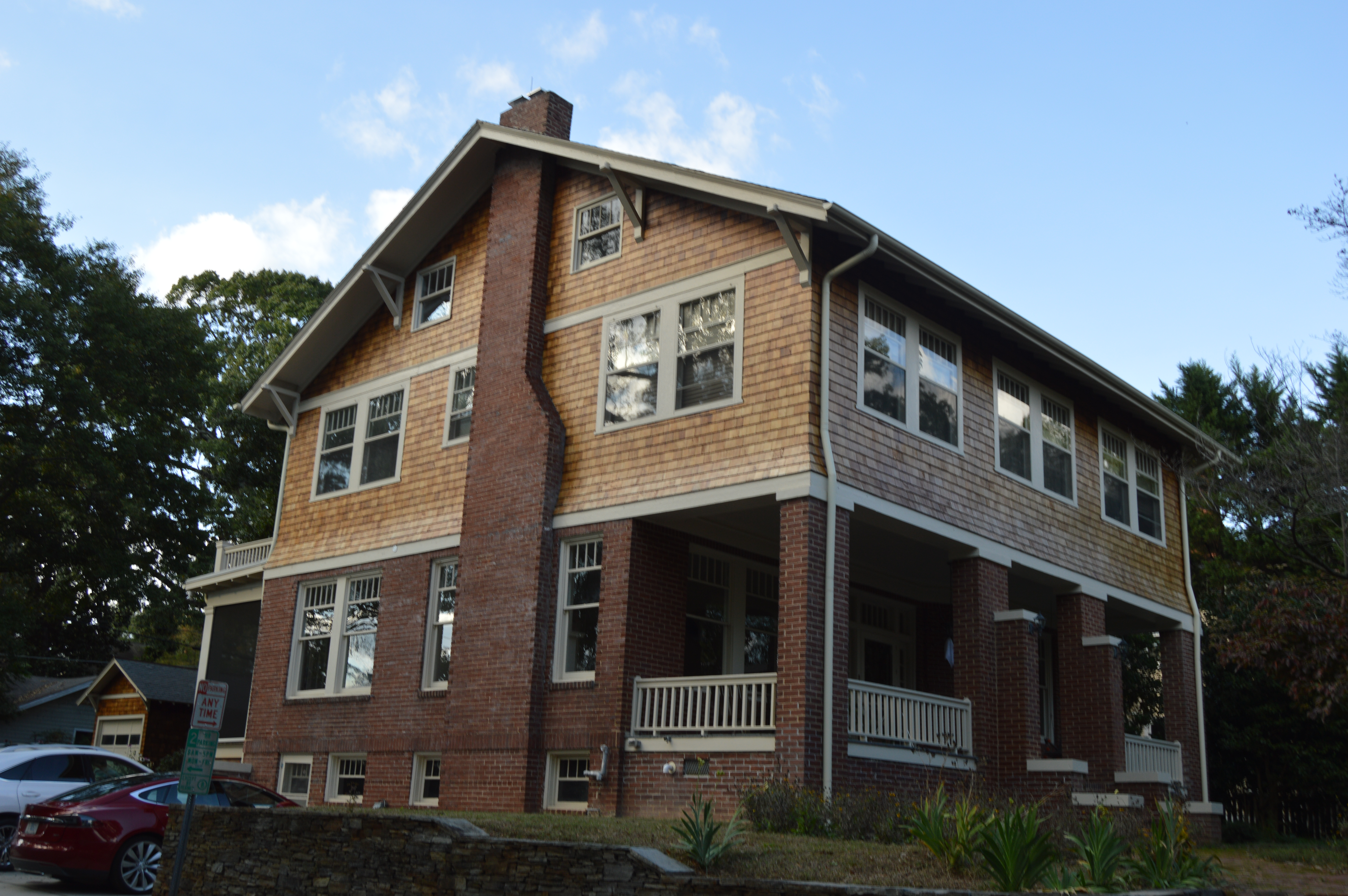
- 1915 house at Hawthorne and Benehan

- Location within North Carolina Location within the United States
- Location: Roughly bounded by Clark Ave., W. Peace and Saint Mary's Sts., College Pl., Hillsborough St. and Oberlin Rd., Raleigh, North Carolina
- Coordinates: 35°47′07″N 78°39′29″W
- Area: 105 acres (42 ha)
- Architect: Multiple
- Architectural style: Bungalow/craftsman, Late Victorian, Colonial
- MPS: Early Twentieth Century Raleigh Neighborhoods TR
- NRHP reference No.: 85001673
- Added to NRHP: July 29, 1985

Cameron Park is a historic neighborhood just west of downtown Raleigh, North Carolina, one of three suburbs platted in the early 20th century. It's one of Raleigh’s most affluent neighborhoods. Former Governor Roy Cooper has a home there as well as the state’s current governor Josh Stein and N.C. State’s chancellor Randy Woodson. Development began along Hillsborough Street and moved north; a streetcar line along Hillsborough made the location especially appealing and convenient. Cameron Park's developers used restrictive deed covenants that set minimum house prices, created setbacks from the street, and excluded African Americans from living in the neighborhood (except as live-in domestic employees). Advertisements for Cameron Park openly recruited socially ambitious upper-middle class residents to the neighborhood, and land and house values were significantly higher than those of other early suburbs.

The neighborhood is architecturally varied, featuring Queen Anne and Colonial Revivals, large bungalows, and more eclectic styles like Georgian Revival, Tudor Revival, and Mission Revival. Despite the stylistic variety, houses were uniformly large and upscale for the era. Cameron Park was listed on the National Register of Historic Places in 1985 as a national historic district. It encompasses 274 contributing buildings and was originally developed between about 1910 and 1935.

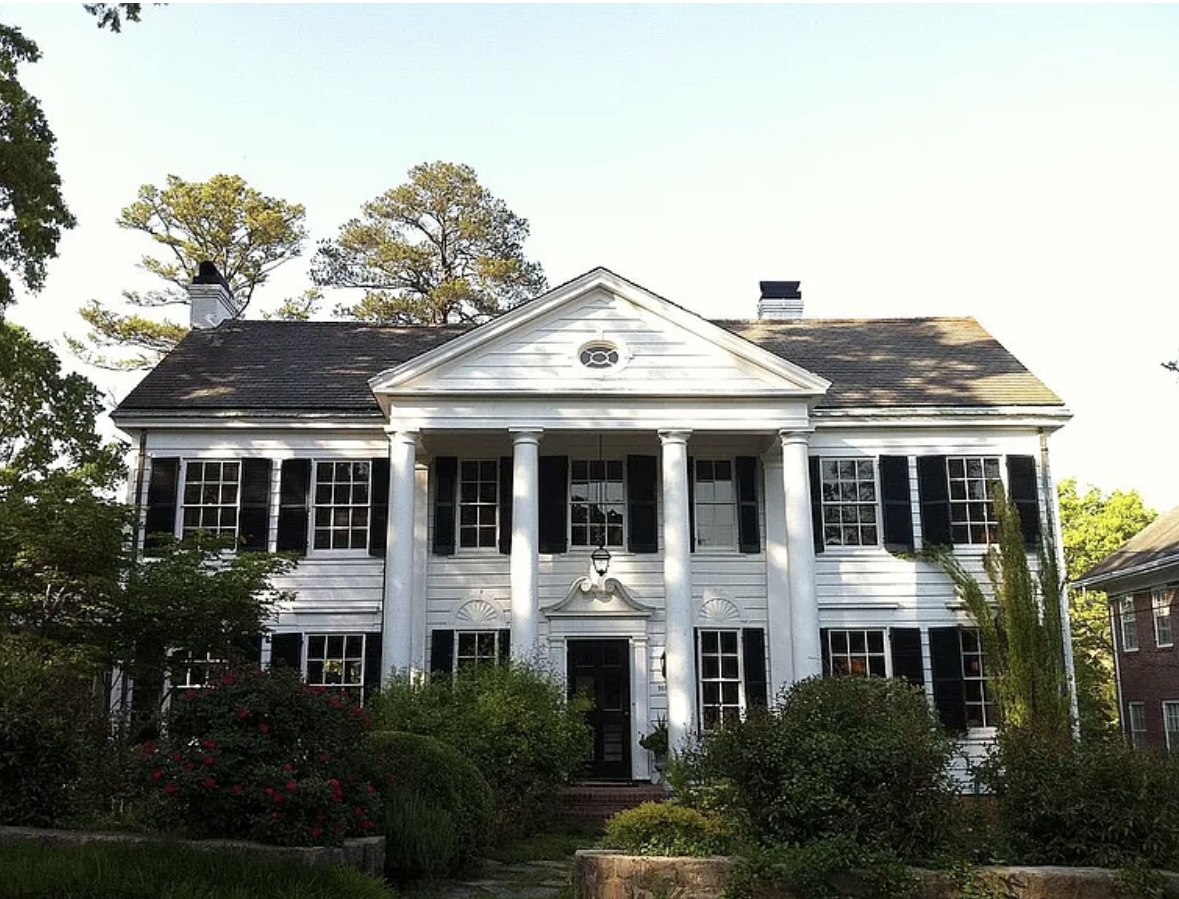
The Cheshire House

== See also ==
- National Register of Historic Places listings in Wake County, North Carolina
