= Michael Curry (bishop) =

Presiding Bishop of The Episcopal Church from 2015 to 2024

The Most Reverend Michael Curry
- 27th Presiding Bishop of the Episcopal Church
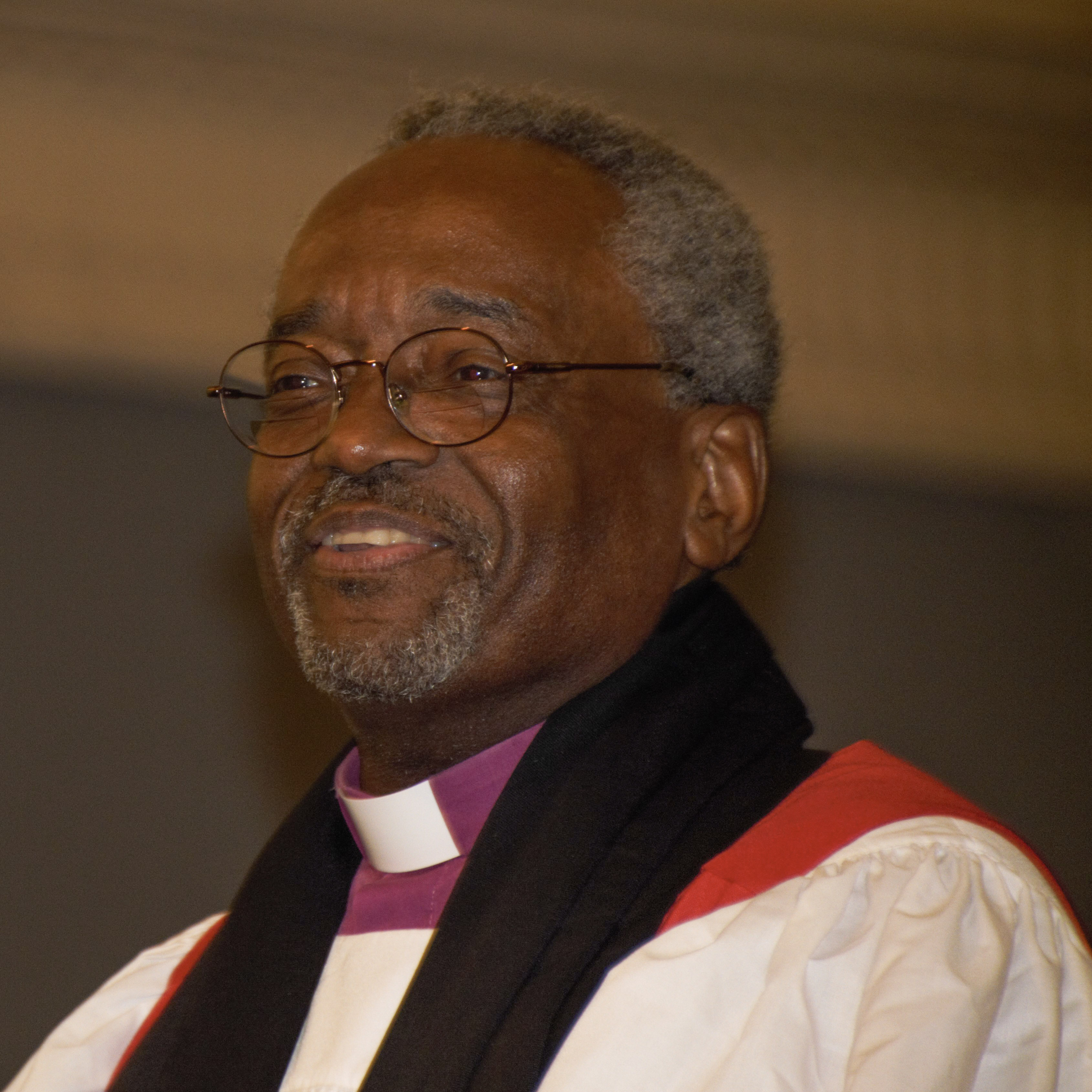
- Curry in 2018
- Church: Episcopal Church
- Diocese: Non-territorial/non-metropolitical
- In office: 2015–2024
- Predecessor: Katharine Jefferts Schori
- Successor: Sean W. Rowe
- Other post: Bishop of North Carolina

Orders
- Ordination: June 1978 (deacon); December 1978 (priest) by Harold B. Robinson (deacon); John M. Burgess (priest)
- Consecration: June 17, 2000 by Robert Hodges Johnson

Personal details
- Born: March 13, 1953 (age 73) Chicago, Illinois, U.S.
- Spouse: Sharon Clement
- Children: 2
- Education: Hobart College (BA); Yale University (MDiv)

Michael Bruce Curry (born March 13, 1953) is an American retired bishop who was the 27th presiding bishop and primate of the Episcopal Church, which is a Mainline Protestant denomination in the Anglican tradition. Elected in 2015, he was the first African American elected to the role, having previously served as Bishop of North Carolina from 2000 to 2015. His tenure as presiding bishop ended on November 1, 2024, and he was succeeded by Sean Rowe.

== Early life and education ==
Curry was born in Maywood, Illinois, a suburb just west of Chicago. His parents were Dorothy and the Rev. Kenneth Curry, who had been Baptists but became Episcopalians when they were allowed to drink from the same chalice as whites in racially segregated Ohio. His grandfather and great-grandfather had both been Baptist ministers. His mother died when he was young; his father and grandmother raised him. Curry noted in his autobiography that both sides of his family were descended from slaves and sharecroppers in North Carolina and Alabama.

Curry attended public schools in Buffalo, New York. He graduated with high honors from Hobart College in Geneva, New York, in 1975. He then earned a Master of Divinity degree, in 1978, from the Yale Divinity School, in association with Berkeley Divinity School. Curry has also studied at The College of Preachers, Princeton Theological Seminary, Wake Forest University, the Ecumenical Institute at St. Mary's Seminary in Baltimore, and the Institute of Islamic, Christian, and Jewish Studies.

== Ministry as priest ==
Curry was ordained deacon at St. Paul's Cathedral, Buffalo, New York by the Rt. Rev. Harold B. Robinson in June 1978 and priest at St. Stephen's, Winston-Salem, North Carolina by the Rt. Rev. John M. Burgess in December 1978. He served initially as deacon-in-charge and subsequently as rector of St. Stephen's Episcopal Church (1978–1982) in Winston-Salem, North Carolina; then as rector of St. Simon of Cyrene Episcopal Church in Lincoln Heights, Ohio (1982–1988). He served as rector of St. James' Episcopal Church in Baltimore, Maryland (1988–2000). In his three parish ministries, Curry participated in crisis response pastoral care, the founding of ecumenical summer day camps for children, preaching missions, creation of networks of family day care providers, and the brokering of investment in inner city neighborhoods.

== Ministry as diocesan bishop ==
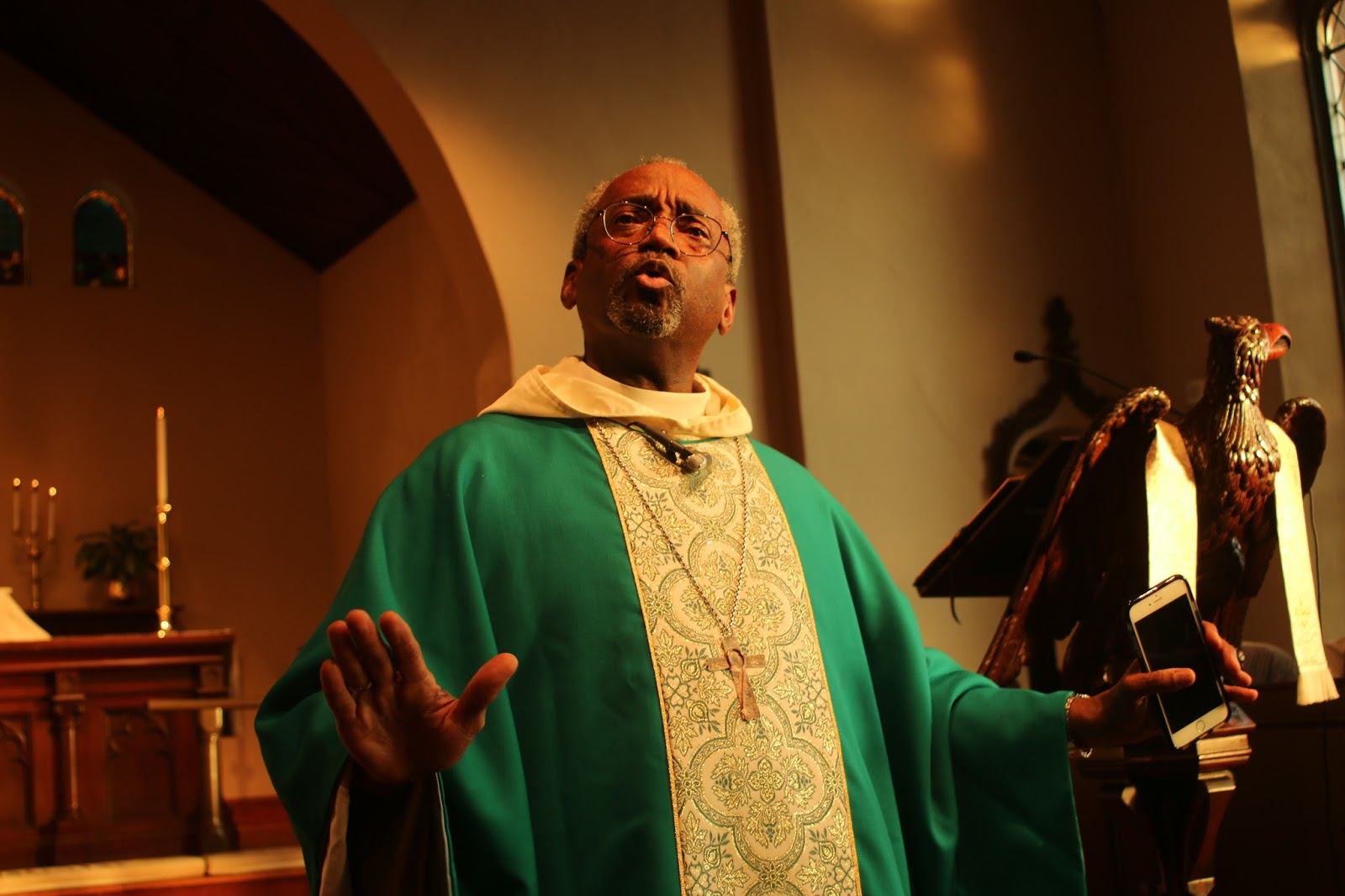
Curry preaching in 2015

Curry was elected eleventh bishop of the Episcopal Diocese of North Carolina on February 11, 2000. When he was consecrated at Duke Chapel in Durham on June 17, 2000, he became the first African-American diocesan bishop of the Episcopal Church in the American South. Nearly 40 bishops participated in the service, including Robert Hodges Johnson, J. Gary Gloster, and Barbara C. Harris as consecrators.

As a diocesan bishop, he served on the board of directors of the Alliance for Christian Media and chaired the board of Episcopal Relief and Development. He also had a national preaching and teaching ministry and was a frequent speaker at services of worship and conferences around the country.

Throughout his ministry in North Carolina, Curry was also active in issues of social justice, speaking out on immigration policy and marriage equality. Curry also instituted a network of canons, deacons, and youth ministry professionals to support preexisting ministries in local congregations. Curry also led the Diocese of North Carolina to focus on the Millennium Development Goals through a $400,000 campaign to buy malaria nets that saved over 100,000 lives.

== Ministry as presiding bishop ==
On May 1, 2015, the joint nominating committee for the election of the presiding bishop of the Episcopal Church nominated Curry and three other bishops as candidates for 27th presiding bishop and primate of the Episcopal Church. The election occurred on June 27, 2015, at the 78th General Convention meeting in Salt Lake City. Curry was elected by the House of Bishops meeting in St. Mark's Cathedral on the first ballot with 121 of 174 votes cast. Laity and clergy in the House of Deputies ratified Curry's election later the same day. Curry was installed as presiding bishop and primate on November 1, 2015, All Saints' Day, during a Eucharist at Washington National Cathedral. The service included readings in Spanish and Native American languages.

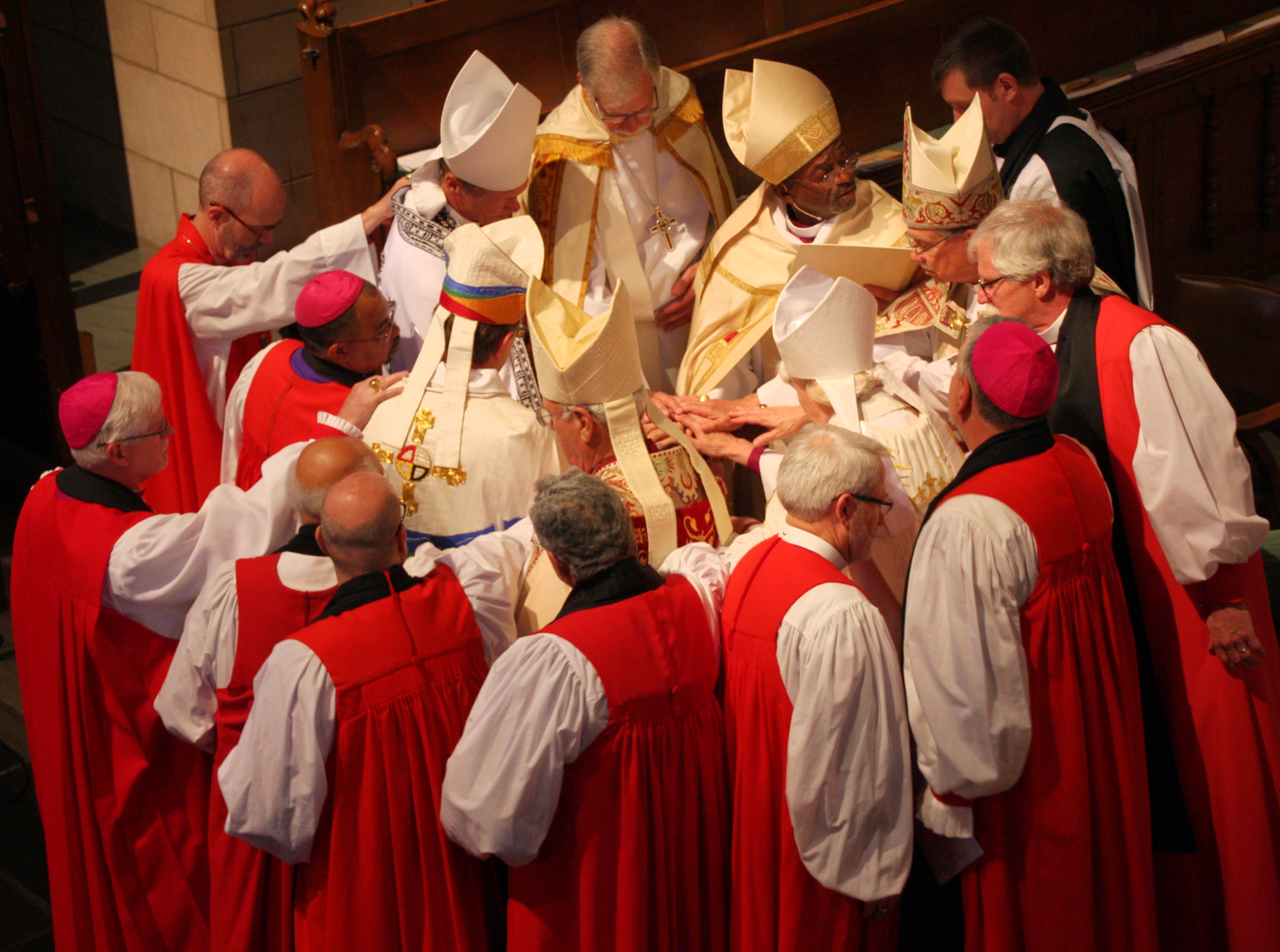
Curry (top right) presiding over the consecration of a bishop

=== Dismissals of high ranking staff members ===
Among Curry's first acts as presiding bishop was the placement of three senior staff at Episcopal Church headquarters on administrative leave pending investigation for violating workplace policies. In April 2016, Curry followed up by dismissing Bishop Stacy Sauls as chief operating officer and dismissing two other senior administrators; Sauls remained a bishop. When announcing the dismissals, Curry stated:

... Our task as staff is to serve The Episcopal Church in such a way that it can serve the world in the Name and in the Spirit of Jesus Christ. We are therefore all called to strive for and adhere to the highest standards of personal and professional conduct embodying the love of God and reflecting the teachings and the way of Jesus.

The precise nature of the policy violations noted by Curry was never disclosed, nor were criminal charges filed.

=== Revival tours ===
During 2017 and 2018, Curry launched a series of revivals "that promise to stir and renew hearts for Jesus, to equip Episcopalians as evangelists, and to welcome people who aren't part of a church to join the Jesus Movement." The revivals were scheduled to include multi-day public events in the Episcopal Dioceses of Pittsburgh, West Missouri, Georgia, San Joaquin, and Honduras. The series was expected to culminate in a "joint evangelism mission" with the Church of England in July 2018.

=== Allegations of abuse mishandling ===
In June 2023, the adult sons and ex-wife of Bishop Prince Singh accused Curry of mishandling their allegations of abuse. Nivedhan and Eklan Singh launched a website dedicated to the allegations and said that they "seek the resignation and defrocking of [their] father from his role as Provisional Bishop of the Dioceses of Eastern and Western Michigan ... and [they] seek to launch a Title IV investigation of Presiding Bishop Michael Curry and Bishop Todd Ousley for mishandling [their] serious allegations of abuse."

=== Anglican Communion ===
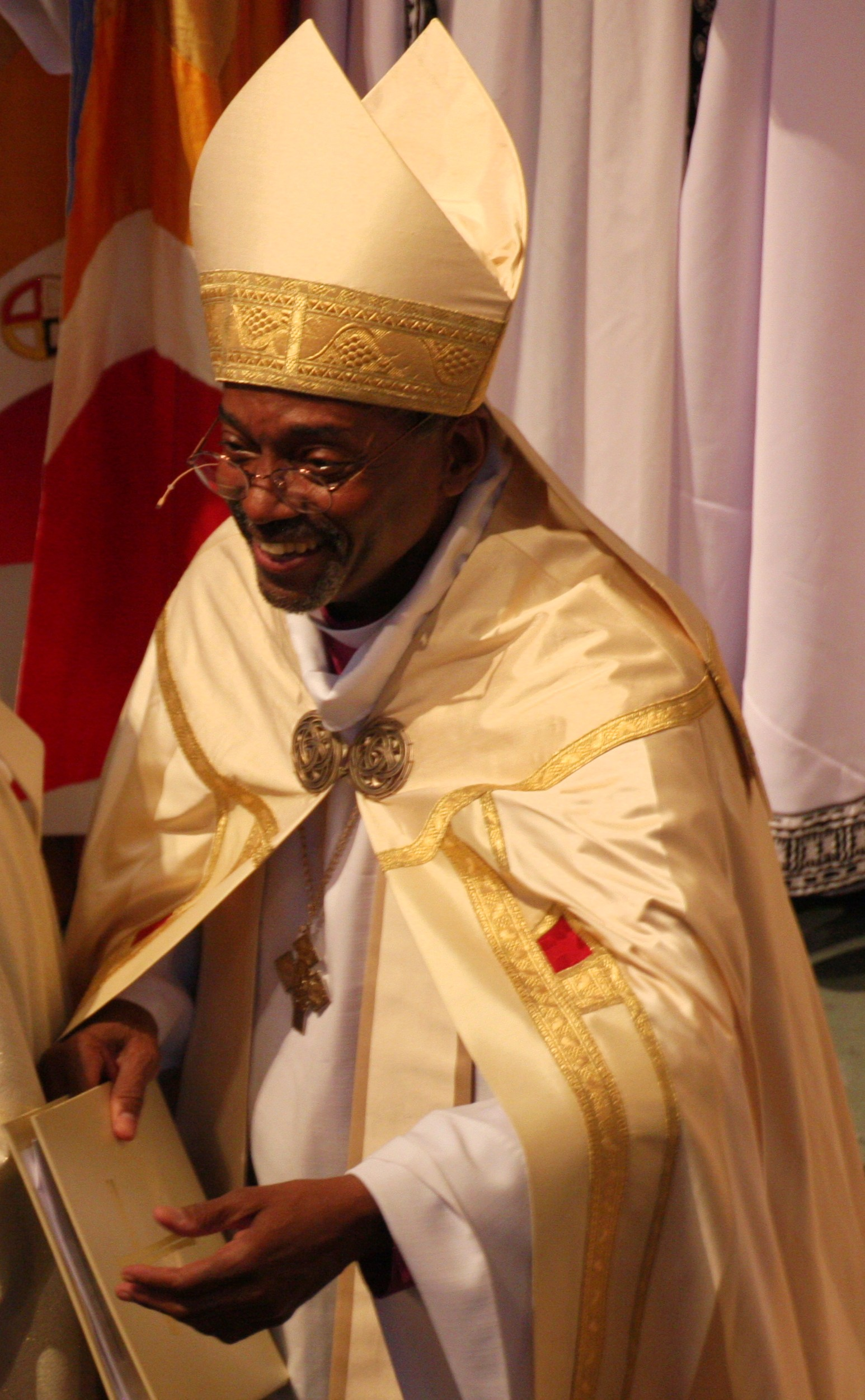
Curry wearing pontifical vestments in 2016

==== Primates' gathering in 2016 ====
In January 2016, Primates in the Anglican Communion gathered at Canterbury Cathedral, mother church of the global Anglican Communion, at the invitation of Justin Welby, the Archbishop of Canterbury. It was the first such meeting attended by Curry as presiding bishop. Human sexuality and the Episcopal Church's July 2015 approval of same-sex marriage rites were prominent topics of discussion. Because of the Episcopal Church's decision to allow clergy to perform marriage ceremonies for same-sex partners, the primates in attendance publicly sanctioned the Episcopal Church for a period of three years. The primates stated that during that three-year period, Episcopal leaders would not be allowed to represent the Anglican Communion on ecumenical and interfaith bodies, would not be elected or appointed to internal committees, and would not take part in decisionmaking on issues pertaining to doctrine or polity.

In the aftermath of the sanctions, Curry maintained his public support for same-sex marriage, stating:

Our commitment to be an inclusive church is not based on a social theory or capitulation to the ways of the culture, but on our belief that the outstretched arms of Jesus on the cross are a sign of the very love of God reaching out to us all. While I understand that many disagree with us, our decision regarding marriage is based on the belief that the words of the Apostle Paul to the Galatians are true for the church today: All who have been baptized into Christ have put on Christ. There is no longer Jew or Gentile, slave or free, male or female, for all are one in Christ. For so many who are committed to following Jesus in the way of love and being a church that lives that love, this decision will bring real pain. For fellow disciples of Jesus in our church who are gay or lesbian, this will bring more pain. For many who have felt and been rejected by the church because of who they are, for many who have felt and been rejected by families and communities, our church opening itself in love was a sign of hope. And this will add pain on top of pain.

As part of the final communique from the gathering, the Anglican primates announced that the Archbishop of Canterbury would appoint a "task group" aimed at healing the rift and rebuilding of mutual trust amidst deep differences. The Archbishop of Canterbury named Curry as one of the 10 members of that "task group" in May 2016.

==== Delegation to Rome ====
In October 2016, Curry represented the Anglican Communion as part of a delegation of Anglican primates to the Vatican led by the Archbishop of Canterbury. The leaders joined together in an ecumenical Vespers service led jointly by the Archbishop of Canterbury and the Roman Pontiff, followed by a private meeting between Pope Francis and the Anglican primates. The events honored the fiftieth anniversary since the then Archbishop of Canterbury Michael Ramsey and Pope Paul VI met in 1966, the first such meeting since the English Reformation in the 16th century. The meeting also celebrated the 50th anniversary since the Anglican Centre in Rome was established. Curry emphasized the need for Christian cooperation, publicly stating the following:

[the] mission of the church is to help the human family, with all its variety and all its diversity and all its differences, to find a way to become not simply a disparate community but a human family of God. Dr. Martin Luther King said it this way, "we shall either learn to live together as brothers and sisters, or we'll perish together as fools." The choice is ours, chaos or community.

Curry's presence in Rome was criticized by Nicholas Okoh, Archbishop of Nigeria and chairman of the traditionalist group Global Anglican Future Conference (GAFCON). Okoh publicly stated that Curry's invitation was a violation of sanctions established by Anglican primates during their January 2016 gathering in Canterbury.

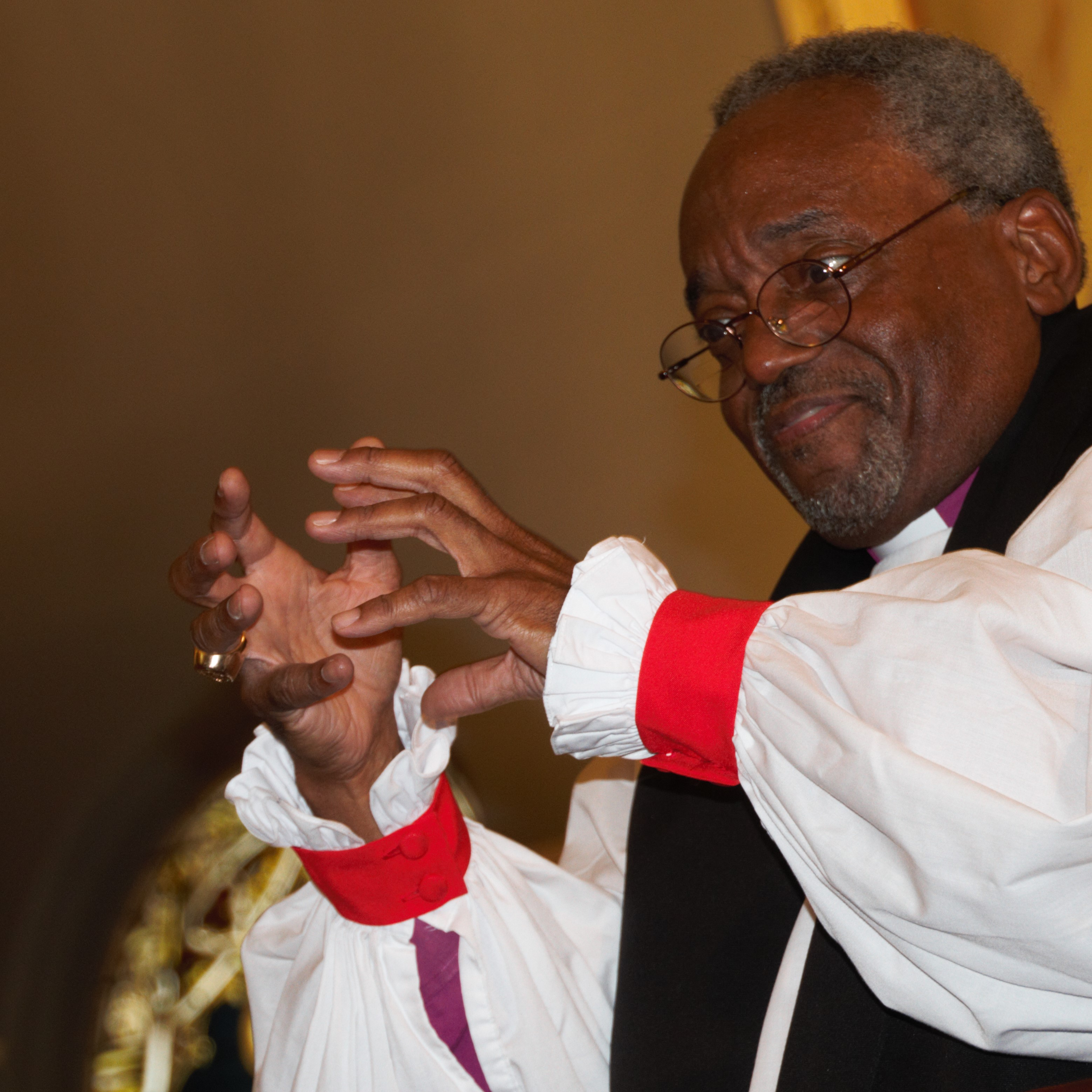
Curry preaching in choir dress in 2018

=== Royal wedding ===
Curry was invited by Prince Harry and Meghan Markle to deliver the sermon at their wedding. The wedding took place on May 19, 2018, at St George's Chapel, Windsor Castle in England. Curry's 14-minute sermon attracted considerable comment.

The sermon emphasized the redemptive potential of love and used fire as a metaphor for its power and significance. His enthusiastic style was reportedly well received by some attending the wedding and the address was described as "electrifying the wedding" having "won smiles but also some quizzical glances" and even upstaging the bride, although there were many other positive reactions. The address was wide-ranging in its sources quoting from Martin Luther King Jr., the traditional African-American spiritual "There Is a Balm in Gilead", New Testament epistles, and the French Jesuit priest and scientist Pierre Teilhard de Chardin. After the wedding Curry received widespread international attention, has published a book, and offered several widely republished soundbites on the service, such as "I could feel slaves", and has been frequently interviewed by American media outlets as to provide a spiritual perspective in the aftermath of significant events.

=== Other services ===
On September 1, 2018, Curry served as the officiant for the state funeral of Senator John McCain. Shortly thereafter, he officiated at the funeral of George H. W. Bush at the Washington National Cathedral on December 5, 2018. Less than a week later he delivered a sermon-like address at "The Spirit of Apollo" program organized by the National Air and Space Museum. The program was held at Washington National Cathedral and commemorated the 50th anniversary of the Apollo 8 mission to the moon.

== Honors ==
Curry has received honorary degrees from the School of Theology-Sewanee, Virginia Theological Seminary, Berkeley Divinity School at Yale, the Episcopal Divinity School, the Seminary of the Southwest, Church Divinity School of the Pacific, and Yale University. Curry was appointed a serving brother of the Order of St John by Elizabeth II on July 25, 2015. In 2019 he received the James Parks Morton Interfaith Award.

== Personal life and health ==
Curry is married to Sharon Clement, with whom he has two daughters.

In 2018 Curry underwent surgery as treatment for prostate cancer. In late 2023 he had surgery to remove his right adrenal gland and an attached mass, and was hospitalized in December of that year for subdural hematoma ("brain bleed") caused by a fall. It was the second time he has suffered a subdural hematoma, having been hospitalized in 2015 on his first day in office following a fall. Following surgery in March 2024 to insert a pacemaker, Curry resumed his public engagements in May 2024.

== Published works ==
- Crazy Christians: A Call to Follow Jesus. Harrisburg, Pennsylvania: Morehouse Publishing. 2013. ISBN 978-0-8192-2886-4.
- Songs My Grandma Sang. Harrisburg, Pennsylvania: Morehouse Publishing. 2015. ISBN 978-0-8192-2993-9.
- Following the Way of Jesus. Church's Teachings for a Changing World. Vol. 6. New York, NY: Church Publishing. 2017. ISBN 978-0-89869-969-2.
- The Power of Love: Sermons, Reflections, and Wisdom to Uplift and Inspire. New York, NY: Avery / Random House. 2018. ISBN 978-0-5255-4289-6.
- Love Is the Way: Holding On to Hope in Troubling Times. New York, NY: Avery. 2020. ISBN 978-0525543039.

== See also ==
- Historical list of the Episcopal bishops of the United States
- List of Episcopal bishops of the United States
- List of presiding bishops of the Episcopal Church in the United States of America

Episcopal Church (USA) titles
Preceded by Robert C. Johnson Jr.	11th Bishop of North Carolina; 2000–2015	Succeeded by Samuel Sewall Rodman III
Preceded by Katharine Jefferts Schori	Presiding Bishop of the Episcopal Church; 2015–2024	Succeeded by Sean W. Rowe
