= Robert W. Estill =

American prelate (1927–2019)

The Right Reverend Robert Whitridge Estill D.D., D.Min.
- Bishop of North Carolina
- Church: Episcopal Church
- Diocese: North Carolina
- In office: 1983–1994
- Predecessor: Thomas Fraser
- Successor: Robert Carroll Johnson Jr.
- Previous post: Coadjutor Bishop of North Carolina (1980-1983)

Orders
- Ordination: 1953 by William R. Moody
- Consecration: March 15, 1980 by John Allin

Personal details
- Born: Robert Whitridge Estill; September 7, 1927 Lexington, Kentucky, U.S.
- Died: October 9, 2019 (aged 92) Raleigh, North Carolina, U.S.
- Denomination: Anglican
- Parents: Robert Julian Estill & Elizabeth Pierpont Whitridge
- Spouse: Joyce Haynes
- Children: 3

Robert Whitridge Estill (September 7, 1927 – October 9, 2019) was an American prelate who served as the ninth Bishop of North Carolina from 1983 to 1994.

== Biography ==
Estill was born on September 7, 1927, in Lexington, Kentucky, the son of Robert Julian Estill (1877–1952) and Elizabeth Pierpont Whitridge (1891–1954). He was educated at the Episcopal High School in Alexandria, Virginia and graduated from the University of Kentucky from where he graduated with a Bachelor of Arts in 1949. He also graduated with a Bachelor of Divinity from the Episcopal Theological School in 1952 and a Master of Sacred Theology from Sewanee: The University of the South in 1960. He also received a Doctor of Ministry from the University of the South in 1979 and from Vanderbilt University in 1980. He received an honorary Doctor of Divinity from the University of South, 1984.

== Ordination ==
Estill was ordained deacon on June 27, 1952, by Bishop William R. Moody of Lexington in the Church of the Good Shepherd in Lexington, Kentucky. He was ordained priest in 1953. He served as rector of St Mary's Church in Middlesboro, Kentucky between 1952 and 1955 and later as rector of Christ Church in Lexington, Kentucky between 1955 and 1963. In 1963 he was appointed as Dean of Christ Church Cathedral in Louisville, Kentucky. In 1969 he became rector of St Alban's Church in Washington D.C. and in 1973 he became director of the Center for Continuing Education in the Virginia Theological Seminary. Between 1976 and 1980 he served as rector of St Michael and All Angels Church in Dallas, Texas.

== Bishop ==
Estill was elected Bishop Coadjutor of the Episcopal Diocese of North Carolina on November 2, 1979. He was consecrated in Duke Chapel on March 15, 1980, with Presiding Bishop John Allin as chief consecrator. Estill was installed as the ninth bishop of North Carolina on January 27, 1983, at Duke University Chapel, and he served as diocesan bishop until his retirement in 1994. He served as President of the North Carolina Council of Churches between 1989 and 1990. During his episcopacy he worked to strengthen the role of deacons in the diocese and support the ordination of female clergy. He retired in 1994.

== Personal life ==
Estill married Joyce Haynes (1928–2019) in 1950, and together they had three children. He died October 9, 2019.

Episcopal Church (USA) titles
Preceded by Thomas Fraser	9th Bishop of North Carolina; 1983–1994	Succeeded by Robert C. Johnson Jr.
