= Edwin A. Penick =

American bishop

The Right Reverend Edwin Anderson Penick D.D., LL.D.
- Bishop of North Carolina
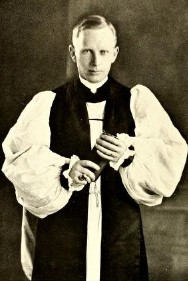
- Church: Episcopal Church
- Diocese: North Carolina
- In office: 1932–1959
- Predecessor: Joseph Blount Cheshire
- Successor: Richard H. Baker
- Previous post: Coadjutor Bishop of North Carolina (1922-1932)

Orders
- Ordination: May 9, 1913 by William A. Guerry
- Consecration: October 15, 1922 by Joseph Blount Cheshire

Personal details
- Born: October 17, 1887 Frankfort, Kentucky, United States
- Died: April 6, 1959 (aged 72) Chapel Hill, North Carolina, United States
- Buried: Historic Oakwood Cemetery
- Denomination: Anglican
- Parents: Edwin Anderson Penick & Mary Atchinson Shipman
- Spouse: Caroline Inglesby Dial
- Children: 3

Edwin Anderson Penick (April 4, 1887 – April 6, 1959) was bishop of the Episcopal Diocese of North Carolina from 1923 to 1959.

== Early life and education ==
Penick was born on April 4, 1887, in Frankfort, Kentucky, the son of the Reverend Edwin Anderson Penick and Mary Atchinson Shipman. He studied at Sewanee: The University of the South where he graduated with a B.A. in 1908. In 1909 he graduated with an M.A. from Harvard University and later graduated from Virginia Theological Seminary in 1912. In 1922 he was awarded an honorary Doctor of Divinity from Sewanee: The University of the South and an honorary Doctor of Laws from the University of North Carolina in 1948.

== Ordained ministry ==
He was ordained deacon on June 23, 1912, and priest on May 9, 1913. He served as rector of St Paul's Church in Bennettsville, South Carolina between 1912 and 1914. In 1914, he became rector of the Church of the Good Shepherd in Columbia, South Carolina before enrolling as civilian chaplain in Jackson, South Carolina, and later first lieutenant in the U.S. Army Chaplain's Corps. In 1919 he became rector of St Peter's Church in Charlotte, North Carolina, where he served till 1922.

== Bishop ==
Penick was elected Coadjutor Bishop of North Carolina in 1922 and was consecrated on October 15 of the same year by Bishop Joseph Blount Cheshire of North Carolina. He succeeded as diocesan bishop on December 27, 1932. He served as vice-president of the house of bishops between 1946 and 1952. He was also a trustee of the University of the South, president of the board of St Augustine's College in Raleigh, North Carolina and president of the board of trustees of St Mary's School in Raleigh, North Carolina. He also served as president of the board of managers of Thompson Orphanage in Charlotte, North Carolina.

== Personal life ==
Penick married Caroline Inglesby Dial on June 20, 1917, and together had 3 children.

Episcopal Church (USA) titles
Preceded by Joseph Blount Cheshire	6th Bishop of North Carolina; 1932–1959	Succeeded by Richard H. Baker
