= Theodore B. Lyman =

American bishop

The Right Reverend Theodore Benedict Lyman D.D., L.L.D., D.C.L.
- Bishop of North Carolina
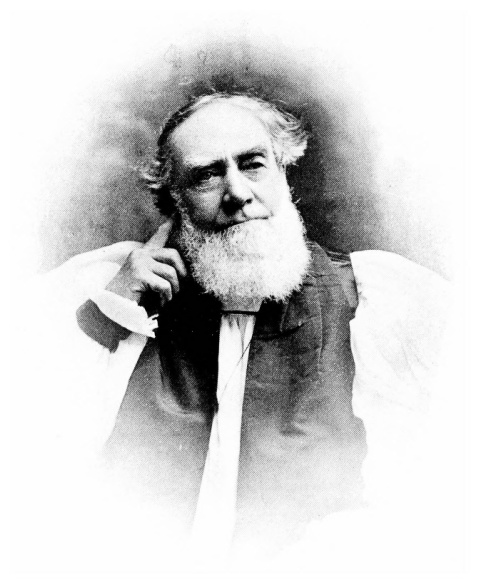
- Church: Episcopal Church
- Diocese: North Carolina
- In office: 1881–1893
- Predecessor: Thomas Atkinson
- Successor: Joseph Blount Cheshire
- Previous post: Coadjutor Bishop of North Carolina (1873-1881)

Orders
- Ordination: December 19, 1841 by William R. Whittingham
- Consecration: December 11, 1873 by William R. Whittingham

Personal details
- Born: November 27, 1815 Brighton, Massachusetts, United States
- Died: December 13, 1893 (aged 78) Raleigh, North Carolina, United States
- Buried: Historic Oakwood Cemetery; Church of the Good Shepherd after 1914
- Denomination: Anglican
- Parents: Asa Lyman & Mary Benedict
- Spouse: Anna Margaret Albert (m. 1845, d. 1889); Susannah Boone Robertson (m. 1889, d. 1893)
- Children: 6

Theodore Benedict Lyman (November 27, 1815 – December 13, 1893), was the fourth Bishop of the Episcopal Diocese of North Carolina.

== Biography ==
He was born in Brighton, Massachusetts on November 27, 1815. He was the father of William Whittingham Lyman. He was educated at Hamilton College and General Theological Seminary. He was ordained deacon on September 20, 1840, and priest on December 19, 1841, for the Diocese of Maryland and served as rector of Saint John's Church at Hagerstown, Maryland. In 1850 he moved to Pittsburgh. He spent some time traveling around Europe and the Middle East He also served as chaplain at the Embassy of the United States, Rome. He returned to the United States in 1870 became rector of Trinity Church in San Francisco. Lyman was one of the founders of Saint James School in Maryland, which became one of the great Church schools in the United States and from which schools such as St. Paul's, Concord NH, St. Mark's, Southborough, and others were founded. He was elected Coadjutor Bishop of North Carolina bishop in 1973. He was consecrated on December 11, 1873, by Bishop Thomas Atkinson of North Carolina in Christ Church, Raleigh, North Carolina. After his death at age seventy-eight, he was interred in Oakwood Cemetery, Raleigh; in 1914 he was reinterred under the altar of the newly completed sanctuary of the Church of the Good Shepherd which had been planned to serve as the new cathedral.

Episcopal Church (USA) titles
Preceded by Thomas Atkinson	4th Bishop of North Carolina; 1881–1893	Succeeded by Joseph Blount Cheshire
