= Cheshire House =

- U.S. Historic district – Contributing property
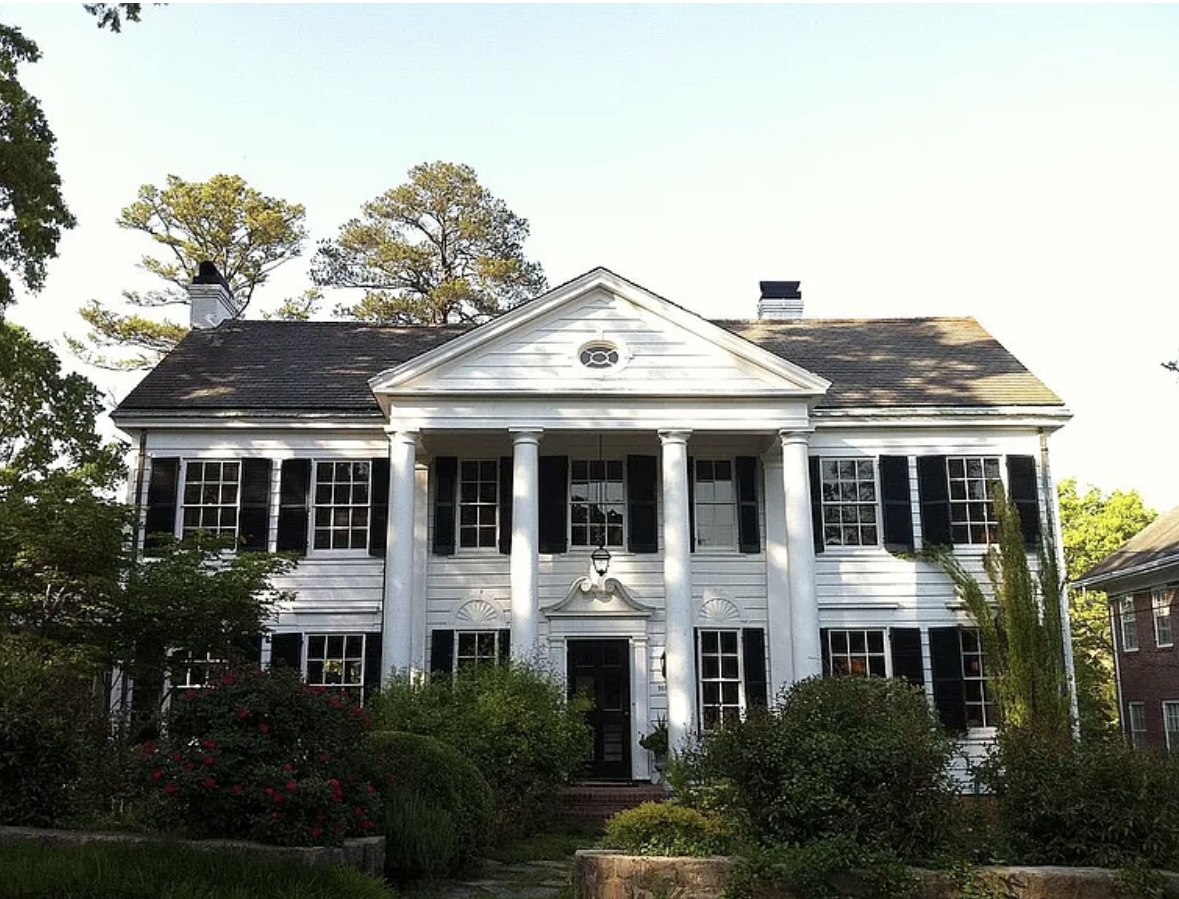
- Location: 1618 Ambleside Drive; Raleigh, North Carolina, U.S.
- Area: 0.40 acres (0.16 ha)
- Built: 1924
- Architect: Arthur C. Nash
- Architectural style: Colonial
- Part of: Cameron Park

The Cheshire House is a historic home in Raleigh, North Carolina, located at 1618 Ambleside Drive. It has been described as "The Queen Mother of Cameron Park."

It is in a colonial style with Georgian elements and a two-story Portico. The home was designed by Arthur Nash and Thomas Atwood. It was built by Howard Satterfield.

It was built for the Bishop Joseph Blount Cheshire in 1916. It was expanded to its current state in 1924. J. Allen Adams, a North Carolina politician, bought the house from Cheshire in 1960. The Home is privately owned, and last sold in 2011.

It is located in Cameron Park Historic District, and is a contributing property.
