= Joseph Blount Cheshire =

American bishop

The Right Reverend Joseph Blount Cheshire
- Bishop of North Carolina
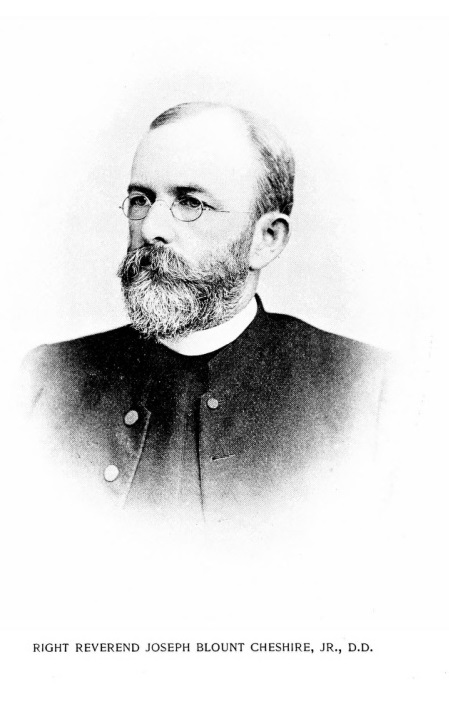
- Church: Episcopal Church
- Diocese: North Carolina
- Elected: June 28, 1893
- In office: 1893–1932
- Predecessor: Theodore B. Lyman
- Successor: Edwin A. Penick
- Previous post: Assistant bishop of North Carolina (1893)

Orders
- Ordination: May 30, 1880 by Theodore B. Lyman
- Consecration: October 15, 1893 by Theodore B. Lyman

Personal details
- Born: March 27, 1850 Tarboro, North Carolina, United States
- Died: December 27, 1932 (aged 82) Charlotte, North Carolina, United States
- Buried: Calvary Episcopal Church and Churchyard (Tarboro, North Carolina)
- Denomination: Anglican
- Parents: Joseph Blount Cheshire Sr & Mary Toole Parker
- Spouse: Annie Huske Webb (m. 1874, d. 1897); Elizabeth Lansdale Mitchell (m. 1899, d. 1929)
- Children: 9

Joseph Blount Cheshire Jr. (March 27, 1850 – December 27, 1932) was a bishop of North Carolina in The Episcopal Church.

== Education ==
Cheshire was born on March 27, 1850, in Tarboro, North Carolina, the son of the Reverend Joseph Blount Cheshire (1814-1899) and Elizabeth Toole Parker (1810-1895). He was educated at Trinity College from which he earned his B.A. in 1869 and M.A. in 1872. He received an honorary Doctor of Divinity from the University of North Carolina in 1890 and another from the Sewanee: The University of the South in 1894.

== Ordination ==
Cheshire was ordained as a deacon on April 21, 1878, and as a priest on May 30, 1880. Between 1878 and 1881, he served as the rector of the Chapel of the Cross in Chapel Hill, North Carolina. He was later appointed the rector of St Peter's Church in Charlotte, North Carolina and served between 1881 and 1893.

== Episcopacy ==
Cheshire was elected coadjutor bishop of North Carolina in 1893 and was consecrated on October 15, 1893, by Bishop Theodore B. Lyman of North Carolina. He succeeded Bishop Lyman on December 13, 1893.

== Personal life ==
Cheshire married Annie Huske Webb (1847-1897) on December 17, 1874. After her death he married Elizabeth Lansdale (1857-1929) on July 19, 1899. He lived in the Cheshire House, finished in 1924.

Episcopal Church (USA) titles
Preceded by Theodore B. Lyman	5th Bishop of North Carolina; 1893–1932	Succeeded by Edwin A. Penick
