= Samuel Rodman (bishop) =

American Episcopal bishop

The Right Reverend Samuel Rodman III
- Bishop of North Carolina
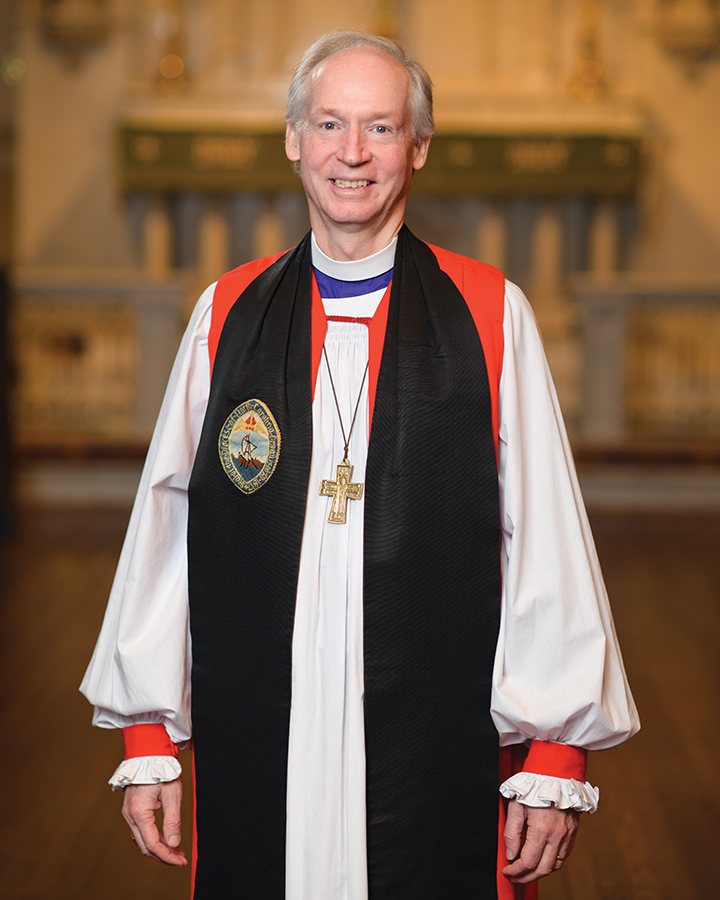
- Samuel Rodman in 2022
- Church: Episcopal Church
- Diocese: North Carolina
- Elected: March 4, 2017
- In office: 2017–present
- Predecessor: Michael Bruce Curry

Orders
- Ordination: August 22, 1987 (deacon); March 19, 1988 (priest) by Andrew F. Wissemann
- Consecration: July 15, 2017 by Michael Bruce Curry

Personal details
- Born: Samuel Sewall Rodman III
- Spouse: Deborah Rodman
- Children: 2
- Education: Bates College; Virginia Theological Seminary

Samuel Sewall Rodman III is an American Episcopal bishop. On March 4, 2017, he was elected as the 12th Bishop of the Episcopal Diocese of North Carolina, and was consecrated on July 15, 2017, by his predecessor, Presiding Bishop Michael Bruce Curry. Prior to his consecration, he was served as Special Projects Officer in the Diocese of Massachusetts. Previously, he was a parish priest.

== Education ==
Rodman attended public schools for 10 years, then transferred to South Kent School for his last two years of high school. In 1981, he graduated from Bates College with a B.A. in English; he later studied theology at Virginia Theological Seminary.

== See also ==
- List of Episcopal bishops of the United States
- Historical list of the Episcopal bishops of the United States

Episcopal Church (USA) titles
Preceded by Michael Bruce Curry	Bishop of North Carolina; July 15, 2017 – present	Incumbent
