= Thomas Fraser (bishop) =

American bishop

The Right Reverend Thomas Augustus Fraser D.D., S.T.D., L.H.D.
- Bishop of North Carolina
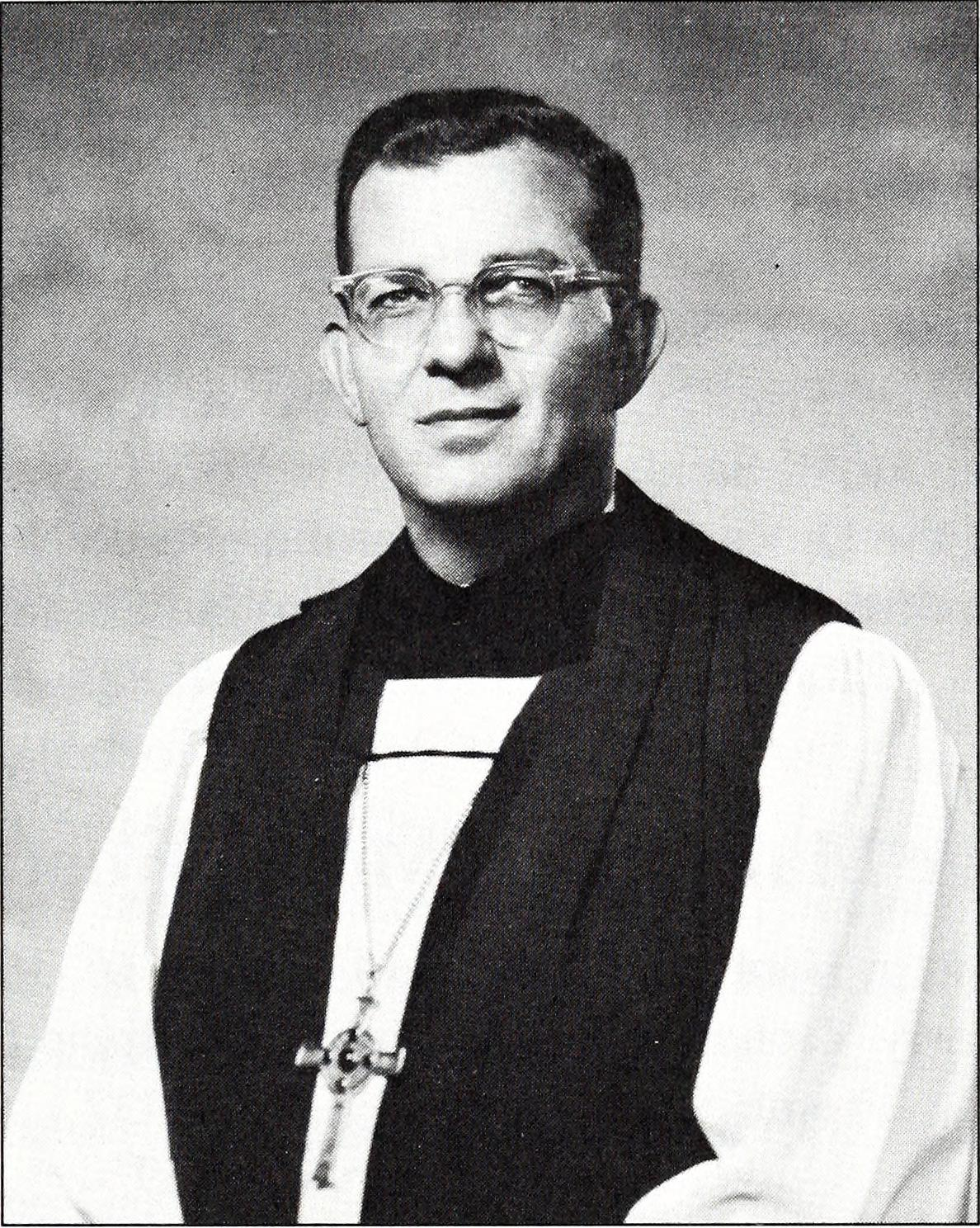
- Church: Episcopal Church
- Diocese: North Carolina
- In office: 1965–1983
- Predecessor: Richard H. Baker
- Successor: Robert W. Estill
- Other post: Assistant Bishop of Southern Virginia (1984-1986)
- Previous post: Coadjutor Bishop of North Carolina (1960-1965)

Orders
- Ordination: February 1942 by Ernest M. Stires
- Consecration: May 13, 1960 by Arthur C. Lichtenberger

Personal details
- Born: April 17, 1915 Atlanta, Georgia, United States
- Died: October 20, 1989 (aged 74)
- Denomination: Anglican
- Parents: Thomas Augustus Fraser Sr and Lena Lee Connell
- Spouse: Marjorie Louise Rimbach
- Children: 2

Thomas Augustus Fraser Jr. (April 17, 1915 – October 20, 1989) was eighth bishop of the Episcopal Diocese of North Carolina from 1965 to 1983.

== Early life and education ==
Fraser was born on April 17, 1915, in Atlanta, Georgia, son of Thomas Augustus Fraser Sr and Lena Lee Connell. He grew up in New York City. He graduated from Hobart College with a B.A in 1931. Later he enrolled in the Virginia Theological Seminary and graduated with a Bachelor of Divinity in 1941. He earned the Doctor of Divinity from Virginia Theological Seminary in 1960 and another from Sewanee: The University of the South in 1961 and from Wake Forest University in 1965. He also earned a Doctor of Sacred Theology from Hobart College in 1965 and a Doctor of Humane Letters from St. Augustine's University (Raleigh, North Carolina) in 1974.

== Ordination ==
Fraser was ordained deacon by Bishop Ernest M. Stires of Long Island in June 1941. He was ordained priest the following February by the same bishop. He served as a missionary in Long Island from 1942 to 1943 and was also secretary and chaplain of the Bishop. In 1942 he became assistant priest of St George's Church in New York City. From 1944 till 1951 he served as rector of St Paul's Church in Alexandria, Virginia. In 1951 he moved to Winston-Salem, North Carolina to serve as rector of St Paul's Church.

== Bishop ==
Fraser was elected coadjutor bishop of North Carolina on February 21, 1960, during a special convention which took place in Raleigh, North Carolina. He was consecrated on May 13, 1960, by Presiding Bishop Arthur C. Lichtenberger in St Paul's Church in Winston-Salem, North Carolina. In 1965 he succeeded as diocesan bishop. His episcopacy was marked with various changes in the Episcopal Church, notably revisions in the Book of Common Prayer published in 1979 and his stern upheavals for it to be used throughout the diocese. He was also in favor of the ordination of women. Fraser retired in 1983 and served as assisting bishop of Southern Virginia from 1984 till 1986. He also was Bishop in residence of St Michael's Church in Raleigh, North Carolina.

== Personal life ==
Fraser married Marjorie Louise Rimbach on May 29, 1943, and together they had two children: the Rev. Thomas Augustus Fraser III (1945-2026) and Constance Louise Fraser Gray.

Episcopal Church (USA) titles
Preceded by Richard H. Baker	8th Bishop of North Carolina; 1965–1983	Succeeded by Robert W. Estill
