= J. Gary Gloster =

American prelate (born 1936)

The Right Reverend James Gary Gloster D.Min.
- Suffragan Bishop of North Carolina
- Church: Episcopal Church
- Diocese: North Carolina
- Elected: March 23, 1996
- In office: 1996–2007
- Predecessor: Huntington Williams Jr.
- Successor: Anne Hodges-Copple

Orders
- Ordination: December 21, 1962 by John Pares Craine
- Consecration: July 27, 1996 by Edmond L. Browning

Personal details
- Born: June 6, 1936 (age 90) Hopkinsville, Kentucky, United States
- Denomination: Anglican
- Parents: James Gloster
- Spouse: Julia Jayne Huston (m. June 7, 1958)
- Children: 3
- Education: Wabash College

James Gary Gloster (born June 6, 1936) is an American prelate who served as Suffragan Bishop of North Carolina in The Episcopal Church between 1996 and 2007.

== Early life and education ==
Gloster was born on June 6, 1936, in Hopkinsville, Kentucky. He was educated at Wabash College and graduated in 1959. He then studied at the Virginia Theological Seminary and earned his Master of Divinity in 1962. He was awarded a Doctor of Ministry from the Virginia Seminary in 1990.

== Career ==
He was ordained deacon in 1962 and then priest on December 21, 1962. He then became vicar of St Augustine's Church in Danville, Indiana, while in 1966 became program director at Waycross Camp and Conference Center. In 1968, he became associate rector of the Church of the Redeemer in Cincinnati, Ohio, and in 1972 he transferred to Pulaski, Virginia to serve as rector of Christ Church. Between 1980 and 1988 he served as associate rector of Christ Church in Charlotte, North Carolina, before becoming vicar of the Chapel of Christ the King in Charlotte, North Carolina in 1988.

== Bishop ==
Gloster was elected on the fourth ballot as Suffragan Bishop of North Carolina on March 23, 1996, in a special diocesan convention which was held at St Andrew's Church in Greensboro, North Carolina. He was consecrated on July 27, 1996, with Presiding Bishop Edmond L. Browning as chief consecrator, at Duke Chapel. He retired in 2007 and then served at St Mary of the Hills in Blowing Rock, North Carolina.

Episcopal Church (USA) titles
Preceded by Huntington Williams, Jr.	5th Bishop Suffragan of North Carolina; 1996–2007	Vacant Title next held by Anne Hodges-Copple
