= St. Timothy's Episcopal Church (Winston-Salem) =

Anglo-Catholic church in Winston-Salem, North Carolina

Coordinates: 36°4′56″N 80°17′2″W

St Timothy's Episcopal Church is an Episcopal church in Winston-Salem, North Carolina (Diocese of North Carolina) founded in 1950.
