= Richard H. Baker (bishop) =

American bishop (1897–1981)

The Right Reverend Richard Henry Baker D.D.
- Bishop of North Carolina
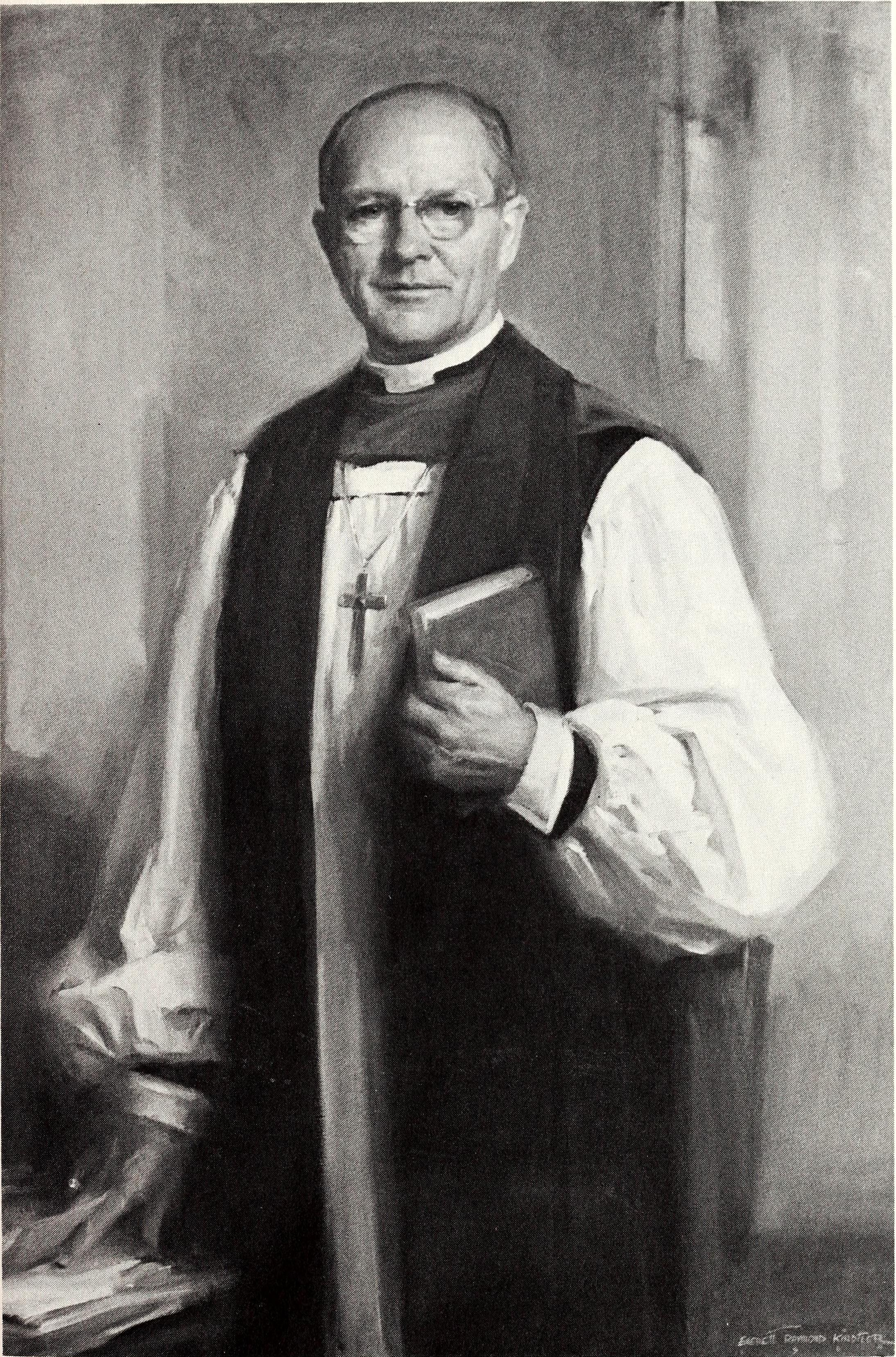
- Church: Episcopal Church
- Diocese: North Carolina
- In office: 1959–1965
- Predecessor: Edwin A. Penick
- Successor: Thomas Fraser
- Previous post: Coadjutor Bishop of North Carolina (1951-1959)

Orders
- Ordination: March 1924 by Arthur C. Thomson
- Consecration: January 25, 1951 by Henry Knox Sherrill

Personal details
- Born: July 8, 1897 Norfolk, Virginia, United States
- Died: April 12, 1981 (aged 83) Baltimore, Maryland, United States
- Denomination: Anglican
- Parents: Benjamin May Baker & Theodosia Burr Potts
- Spouse: Elizabeth Lee Small
- Children: 2

Richard Henry Baker IV (July 8, 1897 – April 12, 1981) was bishop of the Episcopal Diocese of North Carolina, serving from 1959 to 1965.

== Early life and education ==
Baker was born on July 8, 1897, in Norfolk, Virginia. He was educated at the Episcopal High School in Alexandria, Virginia and graduated from the University of Virginia with a B.A. and later enrolled in the Virginia Theological Seminary to study for the ordained ministry. Baker deployed as an ambulance driver on the French front lines during World War I and received the Croix de Guerre for his courageous service.

== Career ==
Baker was made deacon in June 1923 and ordained priest in March 1924. His ministry commenced in Virginia and Louisiana. In 1931 he became rector of the Church of the Redeemer in Baltimore, where he remained until his episcopal election.

In 1950, Baker was elected Coadjutor Bishop of North Carolina. He was consecrated in the Church of the Good Shepherd in Raleigh, North Carolina on January 25, 1951, with Presiding Bishop Henry Knox Sherrill as principal consecrator. He became diocesan bishop in 1959. He retired in 1965 and moved to Baltimore.

== Personal life ==
Baker married Elizabeth Lee Small and together they had two children including the Reverend Richard H. Baker V.

Episcopal Church (USA) titles
Preceded by Edwin A. Penick	7th Bishop of North Carolina; 1959–1965	Succeeded by Thomas Fraser
