= Edmond L. Browning =

American Episcopal bishop (1929–2016)

The Most Reverend Edmond L. Browning
- 24th Presiding Bishop of the Episcopal Church
- Church: Episcopal Church
- Elected: September 19, 1985
- In office: 1985–1997
- Predecessor: John Allin
- Successor: Frank Griswold
- Previous posts: Bishop of Okinawa (1968-1971); Bishop of the Convocation of American Churches in Europe (1971-1974); Executive for National and World Mission (1974-1976); Bishop of Hawaii (1976-1985)

Orders
- Ordination: May 23, 1955 by Everett Holland Jones
- Consecration: January 5, 1968 by John E. Hines

Personal details
- Born: March 11, 1929 Corpus Christi, Texas, United States
- Died: July 11, 2016 (aged 87) Hood River, Oregon, United States
- Buried: Cathedral Church of Saint Andrew (Honolulu)
- Denomination: Anglican
- Parents: Edmond Lucian Browning, Cora Mae Lee
- Spouse: Patricia Alline Sparks
- Children: 5

Edmond Lee Browning (March 11, 1929 – July 11, 2016) was an American bishop. He was the 24th presiding bishop and primate of the Episcopal Church in the United States of America.

== Education, ordination, early ministry ==
Browning received his seminary education from the University of the South, commonly known as Sewanee. While there he was a member of the Phi Gamma Delta fraternity. He earned a Bachelor of Arts in 1952, followed by the postgraduate Bachelor of Divinity in 1954.

On July 2, 1954, he was ordained to the diaconate. His ordination to the priesthood took place on May 23, 1955, in the Episcopal Diocese of West Texas. He was married to Patricia Alline Sparks on September 10, 1953. Together they had five children; Mark, Paige, Philip, Peter, and John.

Browning began his ministry as a priest in Corpus Christi, Texas, as an assistant at the Church of the Good Shepherd from 1954 to 1956, then as rector of the Church of the Redeemer in Eagle Pass, Texas, from 1956 to 1959.

== Japan and Europe ==
In 1959, Browning and his wife moved to Okinawa and began what would become a 12-year span in Japan. He was priest-in-charge of All Souls Church, Okinawa, until 1963 when he and his wife went to Kobe to study at the Language School; they remained in Kobe until 1965. On returning to Okinawa, Bishop Browning served at St. Matthew's Church in Oroku until 1968. On January 5, 1968, Browning was consecrated the first Missionary Bishop of Okinawa.

Browning's co-consecrators on January 5, 1968 in the auditorium of Christ the King School, Okinawa, were

- John Elbridge Hines, Presiding Bishop
- Michael Hinsuke Yashiro, Presiding Bishop of the Nippon Sei Ko Kai
- Harry Sherbourne Kennedy, Bishop of Honolulu; assisted by
- James C. L. Wong, Bishop of Taiwan
- David Shepherd Rose, Bishop coadjutor of Southern Virginia
- Isaac Hidetoshi Nosse, Retired Bishop of Yokohama
- Benito Cabanban, Bishop of the Philippines
- Paul C. Lee, Bishop of Seoul
- David M. Goto, Bishop of Tokyo
- Kenneth Abbott Vaill, SSJE, retired Assistant Bishop of Tokyo

He remained in that post until May 16, 1971, when he left Japan for Nice to assume the post of Bishop of the Convocation of American Churches in Europe. At the time of his appointment to the European See by Presiding Bishop John Hines, he was the first active, full-time bishop to be appointed to the post. Previously the position had been occupied by various diocesan bishops. As bishop in Europe, Browning had jurisdiction over Episcopal churches in Germany, Switzerland, Belgium, Italy and France. Browning oversaw the closing of the Episcopal Church of the Holy Spirit in Nice, in connection with the withdrawal of U.S. forces from France. The congregation merged with a Church of England parish, Holy Trinity, in Nice. The Cathedral Church of the Holy Trinity, commonly known as the American Cathedral in Paris, had become the seat of the Bishop-in-charge in 1922, but for various reasons, Browning chose not to move to Paris but lived in Wiesbaden, Germany.

== Return to the United States ==
Browning returned to the United States in June 1974 to work at the Episcopal Church Center in New York City as Executive for National and World Mission on the Executive Council of the Church. In 1976, he was elected Bishop of Hawaii and was installed at the Cathedral Church of Saint Andrew, Honolulu on August 1 of that year. He was the second Bishop of Hawaii since the Missionary District of Honolulu was granted status as a diocese in 1969.

Overall, he was the sixth bishop since 1862 when Bishop Thomas Nettleship Staley arrived in Honolulu at the invitation of Hawaii's King Kamehameha IV. Browning succeeded Bishop E. Lani Hanchett, who had died in office the previous year at the age of 56.

== Presiding Bishop ==
On September 19, 1985, Browning was elected to succeed the Most Reverend John Maury Allin as Presiding Bishop at the General Convention held in Anaheim, California. His election to the 12-year term came on the fourth ballot of the House of Bishops and was ratified overwhelmingly by a voice vote of the House of Deputies.

Shortly after his election, Browning said of his vision for the Episcopal Church, "There are tremendous global issues that face us all. My hope is that the Church can continue to hold these issues before the full membership, as well as society, to bring about some well-being for all. I think the Church has a role in being both prophetic in holding up issues, and using all its influences to try to bring about better conditions for the poor, the hungry, both in this country as well as in the global village." He also said, "I want to be very clear: This church of ours is open to all — there will be no outcasts — the convictions and hopes of all will be honored."

Browning was installed at Washington National Cathedral as the 24th Presiding Bishop of the Episcopal Church on January 16, 1986. In his sermon, he began to address the deepening rift within the church over issues such as the ordination of women and homosexuality, by saying: "(Do not ask me) to honor one set of views and disregard the other. I may agree with one, but I will respect both...the unity of this church will be maintained not because we agree on everything but because -- hopefully -- we will leave judgment to God." After voters in Arizona rejected a state holiday for Martin Luther King, Jr., Browning insisted that the 1991 General Convention should still take place in Arizona, "to make a witness to the blatant sin of racism."

Browning's views earned him both admiration from progressives and criticism by the conservative wing of the church; the rift, primarily over whether openly homosexual clergy may be ordained and whether gay and lesbian couples' unions may be blessed by the church, grew during his tenure. The tensions broke into a personal public exchange at the 1991 General Convention in Phoenix, Arizona, during a session of the House of Bishops, between Bishop John H. MacNaughton of the Diocese of West Texas and Bishop John Spong of the Diocese of Newark, prompting Browning to call for an unusual closed-door session of the bishops. Browning also supported the adoption of a pro-choice stance on abortion by the Episcopal Church at their 71st General Convention in 1994, the first taken by an Anglican Communion province.

The last year of Browning's term was shadowed by a financial scandal when it was revealed in May 1995, that Ellen F. Cooke, the former treasurer of the ECUSA, had diverted $2.2 million to her own use. Cooke was national treasurer from her appointment by Browning in 1988 until he forced her to resign in January 1995. The diversions, which were uncovered after her departure, are thought to have started in 1990. The revelation of embezzlement caused particular resentment because Cooke had implemented budget cuts and staff layoffs at the same time that she was living a lavish lifestyle financed, in part, on embezzled funds.

Cooke had served as both treasurer and chief administrator; Browning admitted that Cooke's embezzlement had gone undetected because she had "absolute control over auditing" and had prevented any outside checking of accounts. Browning forcefully rejected calls that he resign for not exercising proper oversight over Cooke. Cooke was convicted and served five years in prison, and the church recovered all but $100,000 of the embezzled funds.

During his final year as Presiding Bishop, his book A Year of Days with the Book of Common Prayer was published.

== Retirement ==
Browning retired on December 31, 1997, and was succeeded by the Most Reverend Frank Griswold. He and his wife Patti made their retirement home in Oregon, where they farmed blueberries in the Hood River Valley.

Browning died on July 11, 2016. His funeral was on July 19, 2016, at Trinity Cathedral in Portland.

Episcopal Church (USA) titles
Preceded by E. Lani Hanchett	6th Bishop of Hawaii; 1976 – 1986	Succeeded by Donald Hart
Preceded by John Maury Allin	24th Presiding Bishop; January 1, 1986 – December 31, 1997	Succeeded by Frank Tracy Griswold
