= Richard Sui On Chang =

The Right Reverend Richard Sui On Chang M.Div.
- Bishop of Hawaii
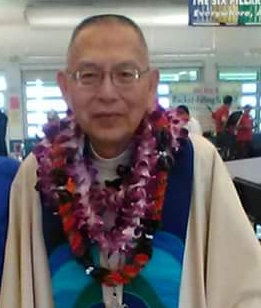
- Bishop Richard S.O. Chang after celebrating Mass at Saint Nicholas Episcopal Church, Kapolei, Hawai‘i.
- Church: Episcopal Church
- Diocese: Hawaii
- Elected: June 29, 1995
- In office: 1997–2006
- Predecessor: Donald Purple Hart
- Successor: Robert Fitzpatrick
- Previous post: Archdeacon of Hawaii (1970-1974)

Orders
- Ordination: September 4, 1966 by Harry S. Kennedy
- Consecration: January 4, 1997 by Edmond L. Browning

Personal details
- Born: November 30, 1941 Honolulu, Territory of Hawaii
- Died: August 30, 2017 (aged 75) Honolulu, Hawaii, United States
- Denomination: Anglican
- Spouse: Delia Morrish
- Children: 2
- Education: Trinity College

Richard Sui On Chang (November 30, 1941 – August 30, 2017) was bishop of the Episcopal Diocese of Hawaii from 1997 to 2006.

== Early life and education ==
He was born on November 30, 1941, in Honolulu in the then Territory of Hawaii. Chang studied at Trinity College in Hartford, Connecticut and graduated with a Bachelor of Arts. He then earned a Master of Divinity from Church Divinity School of the Pacific in 1966. On March 5, 1966 he was ordained deacon and then priest on September 4, by the Bishop of Hawaii Harry S. Kennedy.

== Ordained ministry ==
After ordination, he became assistant at Holy Nativity Church in Honolulu and in 1970, became rector of All Saints' Church in Kapaa, Hawaii, where he remained till 1978. Simultaneously, he also served as Archdeacon of Hawaii from 1970 till 1974. In 1979, he was appointed as the executive officer of the Diocese of Hawaii. In 1986, he moved to New York City to serve as Chief Operations Officer of the Episcopal Church Center and as assistant to the Presiding Bishop Edmond L. Browning. He also was made an honorary canon of Holy Trinity Cathedral in Paris.

== Episcopacy ==
On June 29, 1995, Chang was elected Bishop of Hawaii on the third ballot during a special convention held in St Andrew's Cathedral, Honolulu. He was consecrated Bishop of Hawaii on January 4, 1997 with Presiding Bishop Edmond L. Browning as chief consecrator. Chang retired in 2006 and died on August 30, 2017, in Honolulu following an illness.

== See also ==
- List of bishops of the Episcopal Church in the United States of America
