= Feast of the Holy Sovereigns =

Feast day of the Episcopal Church in Hawaii

The Feast of the Holy Sovereigns is celebrated annually in the Episcopal Church in Hawaii on November 28. The feast celebrates the founders of the Anglican Church of Hawaiʻi, King Kamehameha IV and Queen Emma of Hawaii.

== History ==
Prior to ascending the throne, Kamehameha went on a tour of the United Kingdom and the United States. Whilst in England, he was impressed by the liturgy and worship of the Church of England. Comparatively, in the United States, he was ejected from a train car because they assumed he was a valet because of his skin colour. Upon ascending to the Hawaiian throne, he was obliged to be married in the Congregational Church but insisted on including readings from the Book of Common Prayer. Queen Emma wrote to Queen Victoria asking for the Archbishop of Canterbury to send Anglican priests to Hawaii. This was done with the arrival of Thomas Staley, over the objections of Americans living in Hawaii. This led to the formation of the Hawaiian Reformed Catholic Church, later renamed Church of Hawaii, as an independent Church within the Anglican Communion until the overthrow of the Hawaiian Kingdom by the United States, where it became a branch of the Episcopal Church.

The Feast of the Holy Sovereigns was instituted in 1862 to thank the King and Queen for bringing Anglicanism to Hawaii. It was also to pay tribute to the King also for translating the Book of Common Prayer into Hawaiian and the Queen for helping establish St Andrew's Cathedral in Honolulu.

== Liturgy ==
The Feast of the Holy Sovereigns is observed by the Episcopal Diocese of Hawaii. The rest of the Episcopal Church in the United States of America observes this as the feast day of Kamehameha and Emma, King and Queen of Hawaii, but does not use the name "Feast of the Holy Sovereigns".

Their Collect in (Rite II) begins, "O God, who called your servants Kamehameha and Emma to an earthly throne that they might advance your heavenly kingdom" and includes the lines "grant that we also may be fruitful in good works, and attain to the glorious crown of your saints," referring to their positions on the throne and in crowns.

The feast is also celebrated in the Anglican Church in North America.
