= Samuel Harrington Littell =

Hawaiian bishop (1873–1967)

The Right Reverend Samuel Harrington Littell S.T.D., D.D.
- Bishop of Hawaii
- Church: Episcopal Church
- Diocese: Hawaii
- Elected: November 13, 1929
- In office: 1930–1943
- Predecessor: John Dominique LaMothe
- Successor: Harry S. Kennedy

Orders
- Ordination: November 30, 1899 by Frederick Graves
- Consecration: February 27, 1930 by Hugh L. Burleson

Personal details
- Born: November 6, 1873 Wilmington, Delaware, United States
- Died: November 15, 1967 (aged 94) New York City, United States
- Denomination: Anglican
- Parents: Thomas Gardiner Littell & Helen Arcadia Harrington
- Spouse: Charlotte Moeller Mason (m.1902 - d.1913); Evelyn Alma Taber (m.1915)
- Children: 8

Samuel Harrington Littell (November 6, 1873 – November 15, 1967) was bishop of what is now the Episcopal Diocese of Hawaii from 1930 to 1942. He was consecrated on February 27, 1930.

== Early life ==
Littell was born on November 6, 1873, in Wilmington, Delaware, to Thomas Gardiner Littell and Helen Arcadia Harrington Littell. He was awarded his B.A. from Trinity College in 1895 and graduated from General Theological Seminary with a S.T.D. in 1898. In 1898 he was ordained a deacon by the Bishop of Delaware Leighton Coleman. Following his diaconal ordination he left to serve as a missionary to China. Littell was ordained priest in 1899 by the Bishop of Shanghai, Frederick Graves. He served in China as secretary of the Lower House of the General Synod of the Church in China. He also taught at Boone College from 1898 to 1903.

== Episcopacy ==
Littell was elected Bishop of Hawaii on November 13, 1929, at a special meeting held by the House of Bishops in Washington, D.C. He was consecrated bishop in St Andrew's Cathedral in Honolulu by Hugh L. Burleson, the Bishop of South Dakota, on February 27, 1930. His co-consecrators included the Bishop of Tokyo John McKim and Henry Bond Restarick, former Bishop of Hawaii.

As bishop, Littell incorporated Iolani School and Molokai's Shingle Memorial Hospital. He retired and returned to the mainland in 1942.

== Personal life ==
In 1902 Littell married Charlotte Moeller Mason, who died in 1913. On May 19, 1915, he married Evelyn Alma Taber. He had a total of eight children, including the Rev. Edward M. Littell.

He died on November 15, 1967, at St. Barnabas Hospital in New York City.
