= Episcopal Diocese of Hawaii =

Diocese of the Episcopal Church in the United States

Diocese of Hawai῾i 'Apana Episekopo o Hawai'i

Location
- Country: United States
- Territory: Hawaii, Guam, Northern Mariana Islands
- Ecclesiastical province: Province VIII
- Coordinates: 21.309777°N 157.857375°W

Statistics
- Congregations: 37 (2025)
- Members: 6,010 (2025)

Information
- Denomination: Episcopal Church
- Established: 1969
- Cathedral: Cathedral of Saint Andrew

Current leadership
- Bishop: Elizabeth "Libby" Berman

Website
- episcopalhawaii.org

The Episcopal Diocese of Hawai'i (Hawaiian: 'Apana Episekopo o Hawai'i) is the ecclesiastical territory or diocese of the Episcopal Church of the Anglican Communion in the United States encompassing the state of Hawaii and Episcopal congregations in Micronesia. It is led by the Episcopal Bishop of Hawaii pastoring the Hawaiian Islands from the Cathedral Church of Saint Andrew in Honolulu.

The territorial jurisdiction which the Episcopal Diocese of Honolulu holds today was given up to American Episcopalians after the 1893 overthrow of Queen Liliuokalani, royal patron of the Church of Hawaii. The Church of Hawaii, also called the "Hawaiian Reformed Catholic Church," was established by King Kamehameha IV and his consort Queen Emma in 1862. The king and queen, friends of Queen Victoria of the United Kingdom, were devout members of the Church of England. Episcopalians continue the Anglican Church of Hawaii tradition of celebrating the Feast of the Holy Sovereigns each November 28, in honor of Kamehameha IV and Queen Emma. The former Diocese of Micronesia was joined to the Diocese of Hawaii in 2024.

The diocese reported 6,695 members in 2016 and 6,010 members in 2025. Plate and pledge income for the 37 filing congregations of the diocese in 2025 was $5,482,879. Average Sunday attendance (ASA) for 2025 was 2,100 persons, down from 3,066 in 2015.

== Bishops ==
- Thomas Nettleship Staley (1862–1870) [British]
- Alfred Willis (1870–1902) [British]; married Emma Mary Simeon, daughter of Charles Simeon

== Missionary ==
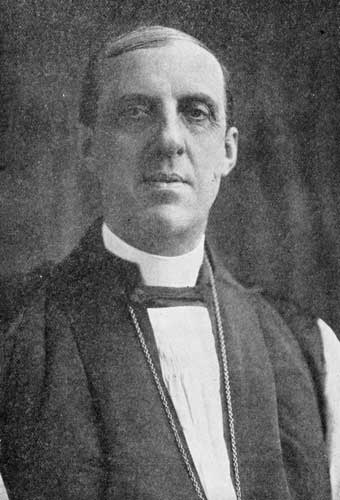
Portrait of LaMothe, before 1927

1. Henry Bond Restarick (1902–1920; first American bishop)
2. John Dominique LaMothe (1921–1928)
3. Samuel Harrington Littell (1930–1943)
4. Harry S. Kennedy (1944–1969)

- Charles P. Gilson, Suffragan Bishop of Honolulu (resident-bishop for Taiwan, 1961–1964)

== Diocesan ==
1. Edwin Lani Hanchett (1969–1975)
2. Edmond L. Browning (1976–1985)
3. Donald Purple Hart (1986–1994)
4. Richard Sui On Chang (1997–2006)
5. Robert Fitzpatrick (2007–2026)
6. Elizabeth “Libby” Berman (2026–Present)

== Churches ==
Hawaii

- Church of the Holy Apostles, Hilo, The Reverend Caleb Collins, Rector
- Christ Church, Kona, Kealakekua, The Reverend Canon Dwight Brown, Vicar
- St. Augustine's Church, Kapa'au, The Reverend Jennifer Masada, Vicar
- St. Columba's Church, Paʻauilo, The Reverend David Stout, Priest with oversight
- St. James' Church, Waimea, The Reverend David Stout, Rector
- St. Jude's Church, Oceanview, (no current vicar)

Kauai

- All Saints', Kapaʻa (first Episcopal Church built in 1925), The Reverend Stephen Whaley, Priest-in-Charge
- Christ Memorial, Kilauea, The Rev. Catherine Amy Kropp, Vicar
- Episcopal Church on West Kauai: St. John's, ʻEleʻele, St. Paul's, Kekaha, The Reverend Kerry Holder Joffrion, Vicar
- St. Michael's and All Angels, Lihue (dedicated in 1991), The Reverend Andrew McMullen, Rector

Maui

- Good Shepherd Episcopal Church, Wailuku, The Reverend Moki Hino, Rector
- Holy Innocents, Lahaina, Vicar, vacant. Due to the destruction of the Holy Innocents Episcopal Church building in the August 2023 wildfire that destroyed the town of Lahaina, members now worship at Honolua United Methodist Church at 5110 Kohi Street in Napili.
- St. John's Episcopal Church, Kula, The Reverend George Wong, Priest-in-Charge
- Trinity-by-the-Sea, Kihei, The Reverend Amy Crowe, Vicar

Molokai

- Grace Church, Hoolehua, Vicar position vacant as of December 2025

Oahu

- Cathedral of Saint Andrew, Honolulu, The Reverend Annalise Pasalo, Interim Canon Pastor
- Calvary Episcopal Church, Kaneohe, Closed
- Emmanuel Church, Kailua, The Reverend David Gierlach, Vicar
- Epiphany Church, Kaimuki, Honolulu, The Reverend Chris Bridges, Rector
- Good Samaritan Church, Honolulu, The Reverend M. Keleawe Hee, Vicar
- Halau Waʻa Episcopal Church, Honoʻuliʻuli (Kapolei), The Rev. Mark Kekaileonui Haworth, Vicar
- Holy Cross Preaching Station, Kahuku
- Holy Nativity Church, Honolulu, The Reverend Libby Berman, Rector
- St. Christopher's, Kailua, Rector position vacant as of December 2025, The Reverend Preston Lentz, Priest Associate
- St. Clement's, Makiki, The Reverend Brian G. Rallison, Rector
- St. Elizabeth's Kalihi, The Reverend Katie Nakamura Rengers, Priest-in-Charge
- St. George's Church and School, Pearl Harbor, Closed.
- St. John's By-The-Sea, Kaneohe, The Reverend Paul Nahoa Lucas, Vicar
- St. John The Baptist, Waianae (Māʻili), The Reverend Jazzy Bostock, Vicar
- St. Luke's, Honolulu, The Reverend James Loughren, Vicar
- St. Mark's, Honolulu, The Reverend Paul Lillie, Rector
- St. Matthew's, Waimanalo, Vicar position vacant as of December 2025
- St. Mary's, Moʻiliʻili, The Reverend Charles Browning, Rector
- St. Paul's, Honolulu, The Reverend Randolph Albano, Vicar (jointly administered by the Episcopal Church and the Philippine Independent Church)
- St. Peter's, Honolulu, The Reverend Ruth Peterson, Priest-in-Charge
- St. Stephen's, Wahiawa, The Reverend Kaleo Patterson, Vicar
- St. Timothy's, ʻAiea, The Reverend Peter Wallace, Vicar

Guam

- St. John the Divine Church, Upper Tumon, Guam, The Reverend Irene Maliaman, Vicar

Northern Mariana Islands

- St. Paul's Episcopal Mission, (A mission of St. John the Divine, Upper Tumon, Guam), Chalan Kanoa, Saipan, Commonwealth of the Northern Mariana Islands

== Schools ==
- St. Andrew's Schools, Honolulu, Dr. Ruth Fletcher, Head of School
- Iolani School, Honolulu, The Reverend Tim Morehouse, The Reverend Andrew J. Arakawa, The Reverend Hannah Lee Sung, Chaplains
- Seabury Hall, Maui, The Reverend Christopher Golding, Chaplain
