= Lani Hanchett =

The Right Reverend Edwin Lani Hanchett D.D.
- Bishop of Hawaii
- Church: Episcopal Church
- Diocese: Hawaii
- Elected: October 4, 1969
- In office: 1969–1975
- Predecessor: Harry S. Kennedy
- Successor: Edmond L. Browning
- Previous post: Suffragan Bishop of Hawaii (1967-1969)

Orders
- Ordination: September 19, 1953 by Harry S. Kennedy
- Consecration: December 30, 1967 by John E. Hines

Personal details
- Born: November 2, 1919 Honolulu, Territory of Hawaii
- Died: August 11, 1975 (aged 55) Honolulu, Hawaii, United States
- Buried: St Clement's Church, Honolulu
- Denomination: Anglican
- Parents: Alsoberry Kaumu Hanchett & Mary McGuire
- Spouse: Puanani Akana
- Children: 4
- Education: University of Hawaii

Edwin Lani Hanchett (November 2, 1919 - August 11, 1975) was an American prelate who served as Bishop of Hawaii from 1969 to 1975.

== Education and early life ==
Hanchett was born in Honolulu on November 2, 1919 to Alsoberry Kaumu Hanchett and Mary McGuire. His father was first doctor of Hawaiian ancestry to practice in the islands. He graduated from 'Iolani School in 1931 and was a graduate of the Church Divinity School of the Pacific and the University of Hawaii. On June 21, 1941, he married Puanani Akana, and together they had four children. He was awarded an honorary Doctor of Divinity from Church Divinity School of the Pacific in 1969.

== Priesthood ==
He was ordained deacon on July 20, 1952 and priest on September 19, 1953 by Bishop Harry S. Kennedy of Hawaii. He then became vicar of the Church of the Holy Innocents in Lahaina, Hawaii, while in 1959 he transferred to St George's Church in Honolulu to serve as its vicar. Between 1960 and 1967, he served as rector St Peter's Church in Honolulu.

== Episcopacy ==
On September 26, 1967, Hanchett was elected Suffragan Bishop of Hawaii and was consecrated on December 30, 1967. Two years later, on October 24, 1969, he was elected on the first ballot as diocesan bishop, the first person of Hawaiian ancestry to lead the Episcopal Church there. He was installed in St. Andrew's Cathedral on January 18, 1970. Bishop Hanchett had represented Province VIII on the national Executive Council of the Episcopal Church since 1973. He died of cancer in St. Francis Hospital, Honolulu on August 11, 1975.
