= Jim Bartels =

Hawaiian museum curator and historian

- Born: July 25, 1945; Honolulu, Hawaii
- Died: April 20, 2003 (aged 57); Newport Beach, California
- Resting place: St. Andrew's Cathedral
- Education: Punahou School; University of Hawaii
- Occupation: Museum curator
- Spouse: Regina Kawānanakoa (m. 1980, div. ?)

Henry James "Jim" Nape Bartels (July 25, 1945 – April 20, 2003) was a Hawaiian museum curator and historian, who was the curator of ʻIolani Palace and later Washington Place.

== Biography ==
Bartels was born July 25, 1945, in Honolulu. He was educated at Punahou School. Graduating from the University of Hawaii in 1967, Bartels received a bachelor's degree in fine arts and a graduate degree in Asian and Pacific art. He served in the Navy from 1967 to 1970 and was based in Saigon during the Vietnam War.

From 1975 to 1998, Bartels served as the curator and later managing director of ʻIolani Palace. During his twenty-year career, he headed the final phase of the palace restoration and saw the return of many priceless artifacts. He resigned after a dispute with Abigail Kinoiki Kekaulike Kawānanakoa, the President of the Friends of ʻIolani Palace, who is said to have sat on one of the two thrones in the museum for a photograph in Life magazine.

He later served as the director of Washington Place, the former private residence of Hawaii's last monarch Queen Liliʻuokalani, helping to convert it from the Governor's mansion to a historic museum. Bartels also appeared on the documentaries The American Experience: Hawaii's Last Queen (1994) and Conquest of Hawaii (2003).

In November 1980, Bartels married his childhood friend Regina Kawānanakoa (1947–2016), who was a cousin of Abigail Kinoiki Kekaulike Kawānanakoa. The marriage ended in divorce but the two remained close friends for the remainder of Bartels's life. She was at his bedside before his death.

On April 20, 2003, Bartels died of infection, despite having been successfully treated for multiple myeloma, in the Hoag Presbyterian Hospital, Newport Beach, California. He was buried at St. Andrew's Cathedral, next to Washington Place.
