= Robert Fitzpatrick =

Robert Fitzpatrick or FitzPatrick may refer to:

- Robert Fitzpatrick (lawyer) (1937–2010), American actor, lawyer, film producer, and music executive
- Robert Fitzpatrick (bishop) (born in 1958), American bishop of the Episcopal Church
- Robert Fitzpatrick (art executive) (1940–2024), Irish American art academic and executive
- Robert L. FitzPatrick, author
