= Church of Hawaii =

19th-century state church of the Kingdom of Hawaiʻi

Church of Hawaiʻi
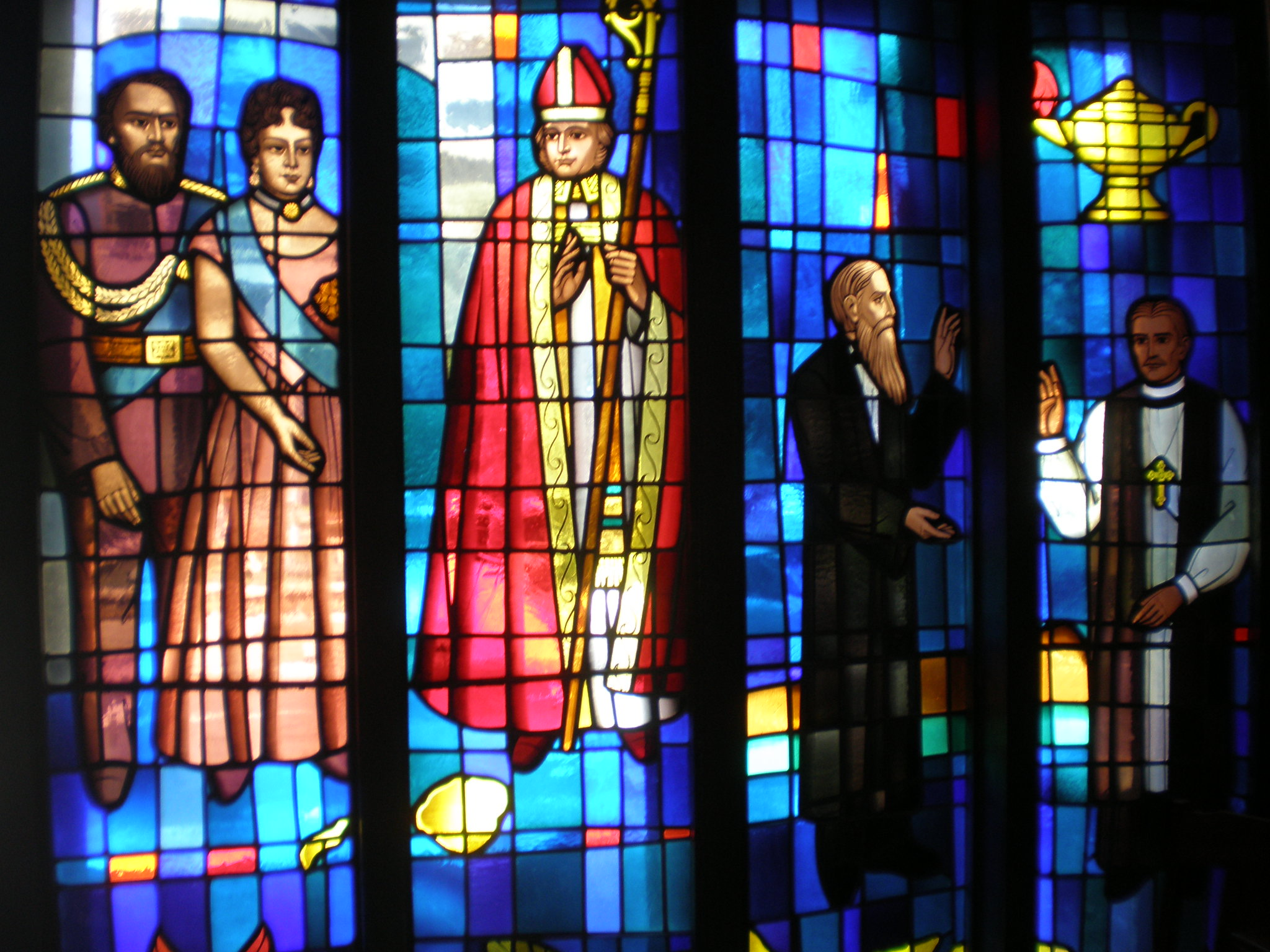
- Kamehameha IV and Queen Emma established the Anglican Church of Hawaiʻi in 1862
- Classification: Christian
- Orientation: Anglican
- Theology: Anglican doctrine
- Polity: Episcopal
- Region: Hawaiʻi
- Founder: Kamehameha IV
- Origin: 1862; Kingdom of Hawaiʻi
- Branched from: Anglican Communion
- Merged into: American Episcopal Church as the Diocese of Hawai'i

The Church of Hawaiʻi, originally called the Hawaiian Reformed Catholic Church, was the monarchy's national church of the Kingdom of Hawaiʻi, "under the high patronage of the royal family," from 1862 to 1893. The church was officially supported by the monarchy and given land by the legislature, but was not established as the "state church" by law. The church was founded by Kamehmeha IV and Queen Emma in 1862. It was the ecclesiastical province of the Anglican Communion in Hawaiʻi, which later merged into the American Episcopal Church during the establishment of the Republic of Hawaii.

== History ==
As a young prince, King Kamehameha IV had visited England and was impressed by the rich ceremony of the Church of England, compared to the dour simplicity of the American missionaries who educated him as a child. His queen consort Queen Emma had a British grandfather and was brought up in a house of a British Anglican doctor. Their 1856 wedding ceremony included Anglican prayers but had to be performed by the Congregationalist minister.

In 1859, Emma wrote to Victoria of the United Kingdom to request a clergyman from the English church. The King's foreign minister, Robert Crichton Wyllie, also made requests through diplomatic contacts. In 1860, Samuel Wilberforce suggested expanding the mission to include a bishop who could organize a new branch. William Ingraham Kip of the Episcopal Church in California also supported the idea, but the American Civil War prevented any help from them. The idea was approved by John Bird Sumner and British Foreign Secretary Lord John Russell. In addition to American Episcopalians, the king was supported by German Lutherans. The first Bishop was Thomas Nettleship Staley, consecrated on December 15, 1861.

The sending of Staley caused friction with the American Board of Commissioners for Foreign Missions even before he arrived in 1862; making him a bishop concerned the Congregationalists, who opposed any kind of religious hierarchy. Rufus Anderson, of the American Board, became a fierce critic, accusing him of ritualism. The officially chartered name of "Hawaiian Reformed Catholic Church" provoked criticism as "papist". After Kamehameha IV died, an elaborate funeral service was held which was compared to a Pontifical High Mass. Staley was even attacked by American writer Mark Twain, and others whom he called "Puritans".

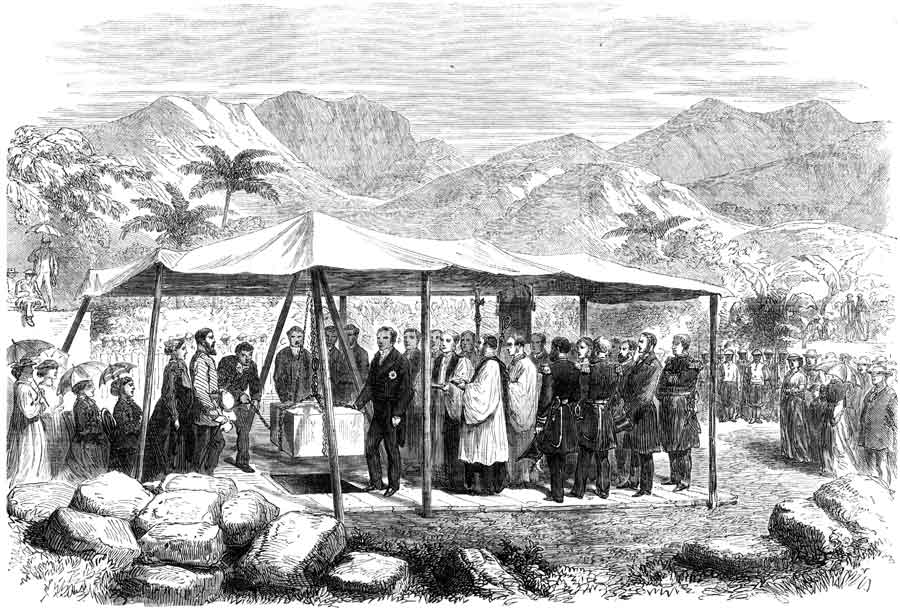
Cornerstone of St. Andrew's Cathedral laid in 1867

The Church of Hawaiʻi became the official royal church, with the king proposing to make the Bishop the "preceptor to the Crown Prince," with land donated from the royal family's holdings, not the government. The monarchs "believed that the Anglican church would strengthen the Hawaiian monarchy." Emma was baptized, followed by a young David Kalākaua who would later also become king. The Royal Mausoleum was built with a private chapel, which contrasted to the simple unadorned graveyards preferred by earlier missionaries. Observance of the holidays of Christmas and Good Friday was begun. Since Kamehameha IV had died on the feast of Saint Andrew, the first cathedral constructed in Hawaiʻi by his brother the new King Kamehameha V was called the Saint Andrew's Cathedral. The cornerstone was laid in 1867, and it became the official residence of the bishop. Two associated schools were also started: Saint Andrew's Priory School for Girls, and a boys' school named for Saint Alban, which eventually became part of ʻIolani School.

In 1867, Thomas Nettleship Staley attended the first Lambeth Conference of the Anglican Communion. In 1870, Staley opted not to return to Hawai'i following a trip to the Americas, and, in 1872, Alfred Willis arrived as the second bishop. During the overthrow and imprisonment of Queen Lili'uokalani, Willis, a royalist, continued to support the Queen. In 1897, Willis attended the Lambeth Conference, before resigning. After the overthrow of the monarchy in 1893 and United States annexation in 1898, the Church of Hawaiʻi was dissolved and became the Episcopal Diocese of Hawaiʻi as territorial jurisdiction was transferred to the Episcopal Church in the United States of America.

== See also ==
- Roman Catholic Diocese of Honolulu
