= John Dominique LaMothe =

Episcopal bishop of Hawaii

The Right Reverend John Dominique LaMothe D.D.
- Bishop of Hawaii
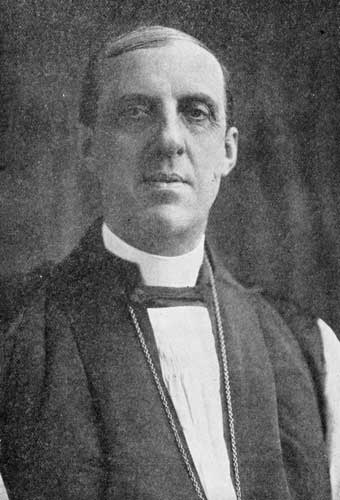
- Church: Episcopal Church
- Diocese: Hawaii
- Elected: October 28, 1920
- In office: 1921–1928
- Predecessor: Henry Bond Restarick
- Successor: Samuel Harrington Littell

Orders
- Ordination: June 29, 1895 by Francis McNeece Whittle
- Consecration: June 29, 1921 by Daniel S. Tuttle

Personal details
- Born: June 8, 1868 Ramsey, Isle of Man
- Died: October 25, 1928 (aged 60) Baltimore, Maryland, United States
- Buried: Ivy Hill Cemetery (Alexandria, Virginia)
- Denomination: Anglican
- Spouse: Margaret Walker

John Dominique LaMothe (June 8, 1868 – October 25, 1928) was missionary bishop of what is now the Episcopal Diocese of Hawaii from 1921 to 1928.

== Biography ==
LaMothe was born on the Isle of Man, on June 8, 1868. At age 17, his father sent him to the United States to work on a farm in Virginia. After a year, he went to Wyoming to work on a ranch. He later returned to Virginia and entered Virginia Theological Seminary. After ordination in 1895, LaMothe served in several parishes. In 1901 he became an assistant minister and later associate rector of the historic Epiphany Church in Washington D.C. under its rector Randolph Harrison McKim. He also served in Saint Paul, Minnesota, New Orleans, Louisiana, and as rector of Ascension Church in Baltimore, Maryland. On October 29, 1920, he was elected Bishop of Hawaii on the third ballot by the House of Bishops. He was consecrated bishop on June 29, 1921. LaMothe died in Baltimore hile attending the 1928 General Convention of the Episcopal Church in Washington D.C. He was buried in Ivy Hill Cemetery in Alexandria, Virginia.
