= Donald Purple Hart =

Hawaiian bishop (1986–1994)

The Right Reverend Donald Purple Hart B.D.
- Bishop of Hawaii
- Church: Episcopal Church
- Diocese: Hawaii
- Elected: June 1986
- In office: 1986–1994
- Predecessor: Edmond L. Browning
- Successor: Richard Sui On Chang
- Other posts: Assistant Bishop of Connecticut (1995-1996); Assistant Bishop of Maryland (1997-1998); Assistant Bishop of Southern Virginia (1998)

Orders
- Ordination: 1963
- Consecration: November 30, 1986 by Edmond L. Browning

Personal details
- Born: April 22, 1937 (age 89) New York City, New York, United States
- Denomination: Anglican
- Parents: Donald Buell Hart & Ann Wentworth Ayres Herrick
- Spouse: Elizabeth Ann Howard (m. September 8, 1962)
- Children: 2

Donald Purple Hart (born April 22, 1937) was bishop of the Episcopal Diocese of Hawaii from 1986 to 1994.

== Early life and ministry ==
Hart was educated at South Kent School, Williams College, and the Episcopal Theological School, in Cambridge, Massachusetts. After his curacy in Chestnut Hill, Massachusetts, he and his wife, Elizabeth, were appointed missionaries to Alaska, where they served in several small Native American villages. He was also a chaplain to native people in Anchorage, and rector of St. Matthew's Church in Fairbanks. He was also rector of St James' Episcopal Church, Keene, New Hampshire.

== Bishop ==
Hart was elected as the ninth Bishop of Hawaii on the fifth ballot In June 1986. Throughout the balloting, Hart led in both orders. On the fifth and final ballot, he received 37 clergy votes and 97 lay votes, with a majority being 33 for clergy and 85 for lay votes. He was consecrated on November 30, 1986 with Edmond Browning as chief consecrator.

== Resignation ==
Bishop Hart resigned as Bishop of Hawaii on June 26, 1994. His resignation came about as a result of a complicated fiscal crisis stemming from the church's guaranty of a $4 million bank loan for a retirement facility which it didn't repay. In 1996 the Diocese of Hawaii's Special Committee on Episcopal Homes of Hawaii, Inc. recommended and the diocesan council agreed to take no further action against the Bishop Hart. After his resignation he served as assistant bishop in the Diocese of Connecticut, the Diocese of Maryland, and the Diocese of Southern Virginia.
