= Queen Emma of Hawaii =

Queen of Hawaii from 1856 to 1863

Emma
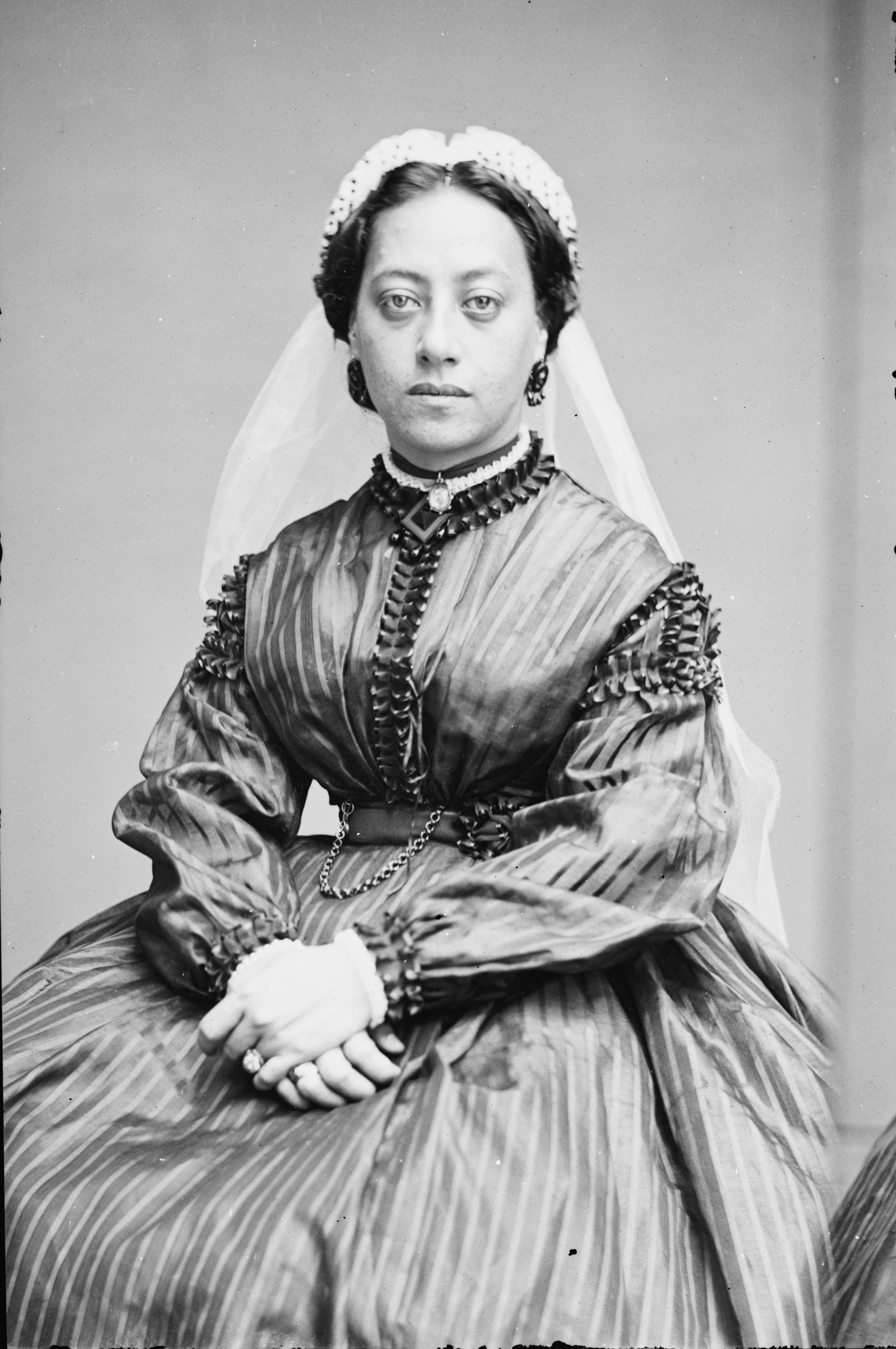
- Emma in 1866

Queen consort of the Hawaiian Islands
- Tenure: June 19, 1856 – November 30, 1863
- Born: January 2, 1836; Honolulu, Oahu, Kingdom of Hawaii
- Died: April 25, 1885 (aged 49); Honolulu, Oahu, Kingdom of Hawaii
- Burial: May 17, 1885; Mauna ʻAla Royal Mausoleum
- Spouse: Kamehameha IV (m. 1856; died 1863)
- Issue: Albert Edward Kauikeaouli Kaleiopapa a Kamehameha
Names
- Emalani Kalanikaumakaʻamano Kaleleonālani Naʻea (Hawaiian); Emma Alexandrina Francis Agnes Lowder Byde Rooke Young Kaleleokalani (Anglican)
- House: Kamehameha
- Father: High Chief George Naʻea; Thomas Rooke (hānai)
- Mother: High Chiefess Fanny Kekelaokalani Young; High Chiefess Grace Kamaʻikuʻi Young Rooke (hānai)
- Religion: Church of Hawaii

Emma Kalanikaumakaʻamano Kaleleonālani Naʻea Rooke (January 2, 1836 – April 25, 1885) was queen of Hawaii as the wife of King Kamehameha IV from 1856 to his death in 1863. She was later known for being a humanitarian, establishing a hospital, and was an unsuccessful candidate for the throne. For her missionary activities she is venerated as a holy woman in the American Episcopal Church.

== Names ==
After her son's death and before her husband's death, she was referred to as "Kaleleokalani", or "flight of the heavenly one". After her husband also died, it was changed into the plural form as "Kaleleonālani", or the "flight of the heavenly ones". She was baptized into the Anglican faith on October 21, 1862, as "Emma Alexandrina Francis Agnes Lowder Byde Rooke Young Kaleleokalani.

Queen Emma was also honoured in the 19th century mele "Wahine Holo Lio" (horseback riding lady) referring to her renowned horsemanship.

== Early life ==
Emma was born on January 2, 1836, in Honolulu and was often called Emalani ("royal Emma"). Her father was High Chief George Naʻea and her mother was High Chiefess Fanny Kekelaokalani Young. She was adopted under the Hawaiian tradition of hānai by her childless maternal aunt, chiefess Grace Kamaʻikuʻi Young Rooke, and her husband, Thomas C. B. Rooke.

Emma's father Naʻea was the son of High Chief Kamaunu and High Chiefess Kukaeleiki. Kukaeleiki was daughter of Kalauawa, a Kauaʻi noble, and she was a cousin of Queen Keōpūolani, the most sacred wife of Kamehameha I. Among Naʻea's more notable ancestors were Kalanawaʻa, a high chief of Oʻahu, and High Chiefess Kuaenaokalani, who held the sacred kapu rank of Kekapupoʻohoʻolewaikala (so sacred that she could not be exposed to the sun except at dawn).

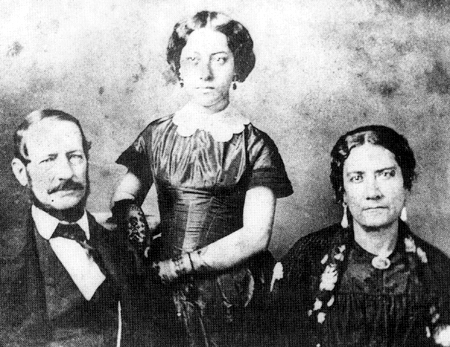
Emma and her hānai parents.

On her mother's side, Emma was the granddaughter of John Young, Kamehameha I's British-born military advisor known as High Chief Olohana, and Princess Kaʻōanaʻeha Kuamoʻo. Her maternal grandmother, Kaʻōanaʻeha, was generally called the niece of Kamehameha I. Chiefess Kaʻōanaʻeha's father is disputed; some say she was the daughter of Prince Keliʻimaikaʻi, the only full brother of Kamehameha; others say Kaʻōanaʻeha's father was High Chief Kalaipaihala. This confusion is due to the fact that High Chiefess Kalikoʻokalani, the mother of Kaʻōanaʻeha, married both Keliʻimaikaʻi and Kalaipaihala. Through High Chief Kalaipaihala, she could be descended from Kalaniʻopuʻu, King of Hawaii before Kīwalaʻō and Kamehameha. King Kalākaua and Queen Liliʻuokalani criticized Queen Emma's claim of descent from Kamehameha's brother, supporting the latter theory of descent. Liliʻuokalani claimed that Keliʻimaikaʻi had no children, and that Kiilaweau, Keliʻimaikaʻi's first wife, was a man. This was to strengthen their claim to the throne, since their great-grandfather was Kamehameha I's first cousin. But even on the second theory, Queen Emma would still have been a descendant of Kamehameha I's first cousin since Kalaniʻopuʻu was the uncle of Kamehameha I. It can be noted that one historian of the time, Samuel Kamakau, supported Queen Emma's descent from Keliʻimaikaʻi and the genealogy stated by Liliuokalani was contested in her own lifetime.

Emma grew up in her adoptive parents' English mansion, the Rooke House, in Honolulu. Emma was educated at the Royal School, established by American missionaries. Other Hawaiian royals attending the school included Emma's half-sister Mary Paʻaʻāina. Like her classmates Bernice Pauahi Bishop, David Kalākaua and Lydia Liliʻuokalani, Emma was cross-cultural—both Hawaiian and Euro-American in her habits. When the school closed, Rooke hired an English governess, Sarah Rhodes von Pfister, to tutor Emma. He also encouraged reading from his extensive library. As a writer, he influenced Emma's interest in reading and books. By the time she was 20, she was quite accomplished. She was 5' 2" and slender, with large black eyes. Her musical talents as a vocalist, pianist, and dancer were well known. She was also a skilled equestrian.

== Married life and reign ==
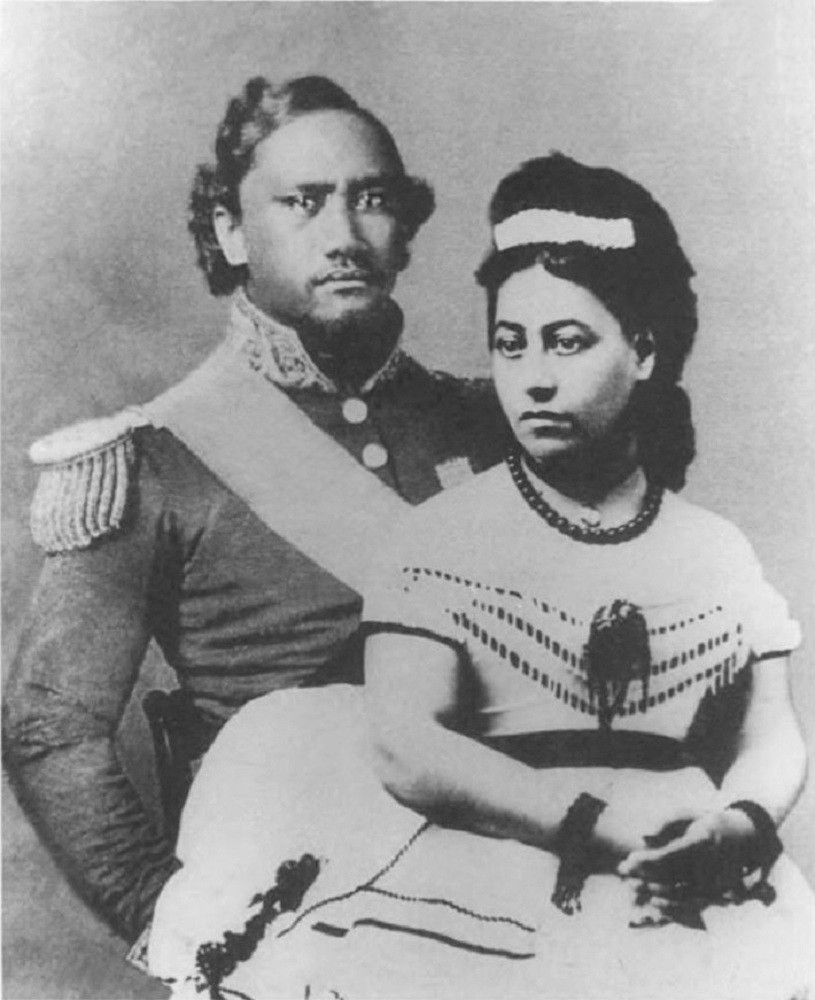
Composite image of Emma and Kamehameha IV

Emma became engaged to the King of Hawaii, Alexander Liholiho. At the engagement party, a Hawaiian charged that Emma's European blood made her unfit to be the Hawaiian queen and her lineage was not suitable enough to be Alexander Liholiho's bride. She broke into tears and the King was infuriated. On June 19, 1856, she married Alexander Liholiho, who a year earlier had assumed the throne as Kamehameha IV. He was also fluent in both Hawaiian and English. Each nation and even the Chinese hosted balls and celebrations in honor of the newlyweds. On May 20, 1858, Emma gave birth to a son, Prince Albert Edward Kamehameha.

The Queen tended palace affairs, including the expansion of the palace library. In 1861, she sang in the chorus of a performance of Verdi's opera Il Trovatore in Honolulu while her husband acted as stage manager. She was known for her humanitarian efforts. Inspired by her adoptive father's work, she encouraged her husband to establish a public hospital to help the Native Hawaiians who were in decline due to foreign-borne diseases like smallpox. In 1859, Emma established Queen's Hospital and visited patients there almost daily whenever she was in residence in Honolulu. It is now called the Queen's Medical Center. She also founded St. Andrewʻs Priory school for girls. Queen Emma recognized the educational needs of the young women of Hawaiʻi and founded St. Andrew's Priory so that Hawaiian girls would receive an education equivalent to what was traditionally offered to boys.

In 1860, Queen Emma and King Kamehameha IV entertained a group of Japanese diplomats who were stopping in Honolulu on their way to Washington. These men were part of the Japanese Embassy to the United States, Japan's first diplomatic mission to the United States since the 1854 opening of Japan by Commodore Matthew Perry. Their meeting with Queen Emma, Princess Victoria, and the queen's ladies-in-waiting was the first time these men had seen women in Western crinoline dress and also the first time they bowed to a queen.

Prince Albert, who was always called "Baby" by Emma, had been celebrated for days at his birth and every public appearance. Mary Allen, wife of the Chief Justice of the Supreme Court Elisha Hunt Allen, had a son Frederick about the same age, and they became playmates. In 1862, Queen Victoria agreed to become godmother by proxy, and sent an elaborate silver christening cup. Before the cup could arrive, the prince fell ill in August and his condition worsened. The Prince died on August 27, 1862. Her husband died a year later, and Emma had no more children.

== Establishment of the Church of Hawaii ==
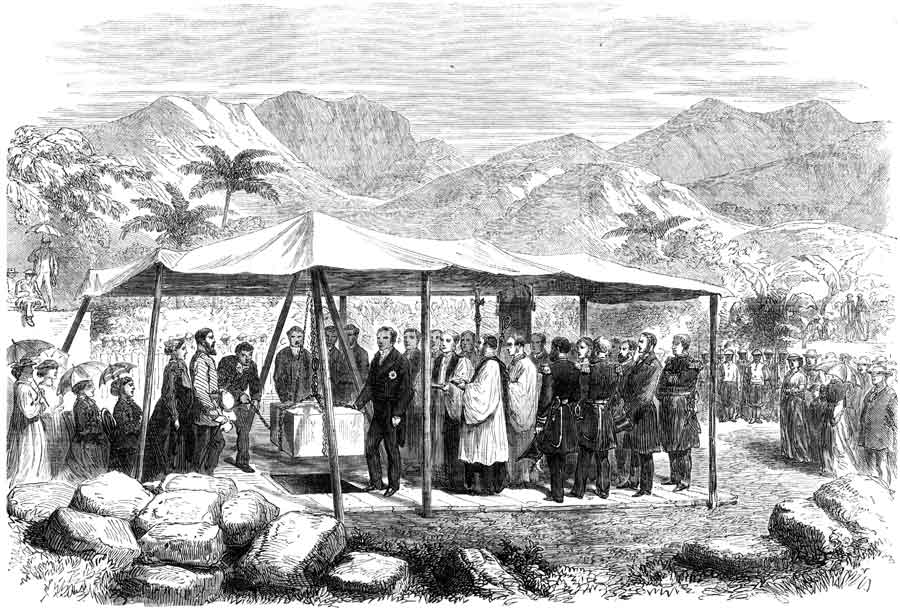
Laying of the cornerstone of St. Andrew's Cathedral in 1867

In 1860, Queen Emma and King Kamehameha IV petitioned the Church of England to help establish the Church of Hawaii. Upon the arrival of Anglican bishop Thomas Nettleship Staley and two priests, Emma and Kamehameha were both baptized on October 21, 1862, and confirmed in November 1862. With her husband, she championed the Anglican (Episcopal) church in Hawaii and founded St. Andrew's Cathedral, raising funds for the building. In 1867 she founded Saint Andrew's Priory School for Girls. She also laid the groundwork for an Episcopal secondary school for boys originally named for Saint Alban, and later ʻIolani School in honor of her husband. (For her posthumous religious legacy, see below.)

== Visit to Europe and United States, 1865–1866 ==
Queen Emma's travel to Europe and the United States (1865–1866)

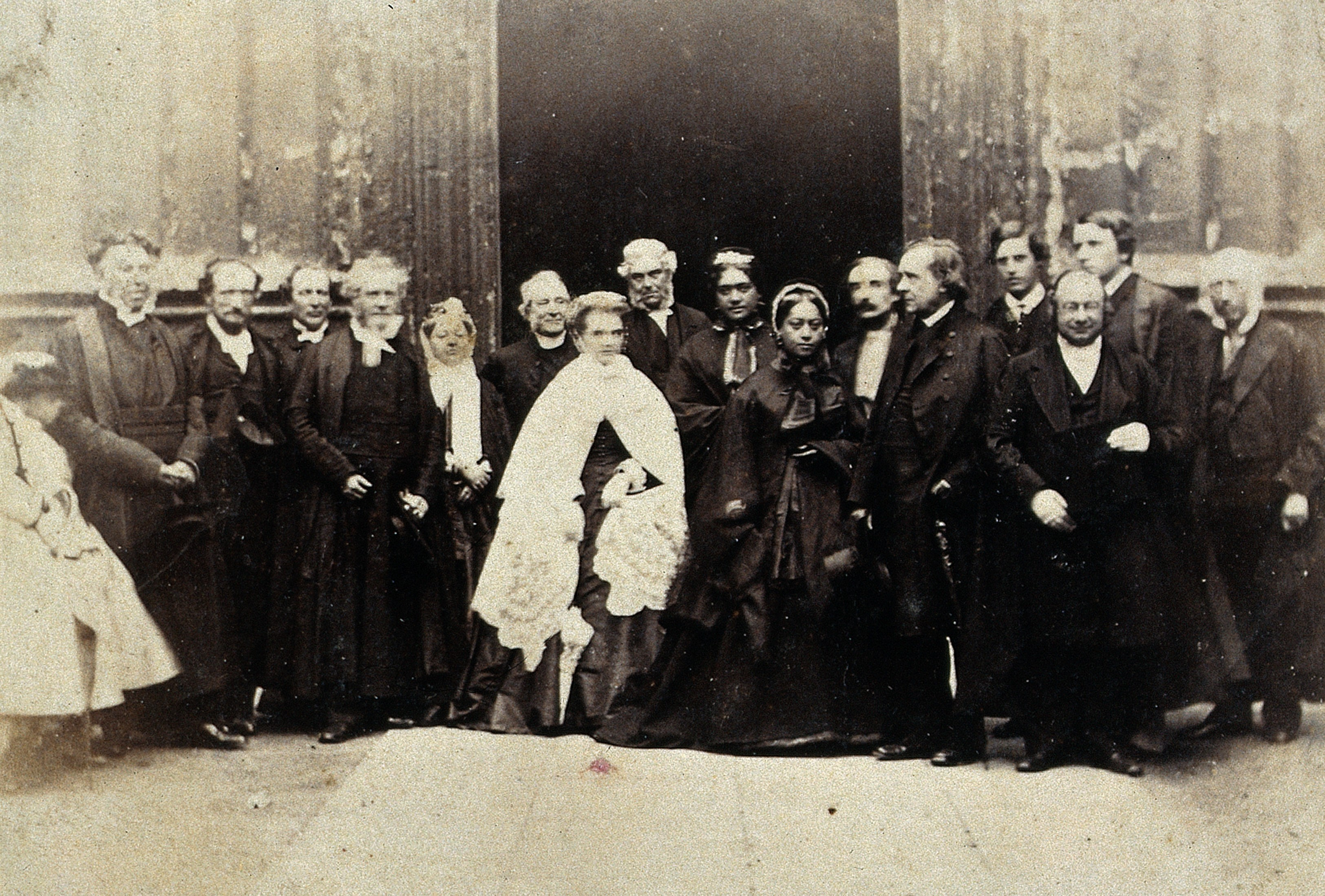
Queen Emma with Anglican church dignitaries at Oxford, 1866

From 1865 to 1866, she traveled to England and the United States for her health and to help the burgeoning Anglican mission in Hawaii. She visited London and spent the winter at Hyères in the French Riviera and then toured Northern Italy and Southern Germany before visiting Paris. She returned to London in June 1866 and went sightseeing in Ireland before sailing for New York. In her time in Europe, she met with Queen Victoria, Emperor Napoleon III and Empress Eugénie of France, and King Ludwig I of Bavaria, who unsuccessfully proposed to Emma, and Grand Duke Frederick I and Grand Duchess Louise of Baden and other Europeans royals, government dignitaries and Anglican clergy.

In the United States, she had a reception given for her on August 14, 1866, by President Andrew Johnson and First Lady Eliza McCardle Johnson at the White House. Some note this as the first time anyone with the title "Queen" had had an official visit to the U.S. presidential residence. Secretary of State William H. Seward hosted the Queen at his house and gave her a state dinner on August 18. The following evening she attended a private dinner at the White House with the president, his family and Seward. While in Washington, she also met the Choctaw chief Peter Pitchlynn and his country's delegation, along with delegations of Chickasaw and Cherokee. After visiting Washington, she visited Niagara Falls at the end of August 1866. She then headed directly to Québec City (through Montreal) where she stayed at the St Louis Hotel. Two hours after settling in the hotel she received the news, via telegram, of her hānai mother Grace's death in Hawaii on July 26. This prompted her to end her Canadian trip immediately and journey home. On her return trip she traveled from New York to Panama and then California. In San Francisco, the United States government dispatched the USS Vanderbilt to bring her back to Honolulu by October 22.

A pamphlet Queen Emma: A Narrative of the Object of Her Mission to England describing her travel and mission in England was published anonymously in London in December 1865. American missionary Samuel C. Damon re-published this in his newspaper The Friend in June 1866 and pointed out some errors in the work.

== Royal election of 1874 ==
After the death of King Lunalilo, Emma decided to run in the constitutionally mandated royal election against future King Kalākaua. She claimed that Lunalilo had wanted her to succeed him, but died before a formal proclamation could be made.

The day after Lunalilo died, Kalākaua declared himself a candidate for the throne. The next day Queen Emma did the same. The first real animosity between the Kamehamehas and Kalākaua begun to appear, as he published a proclamation:

To the Hawaiian Nation.

Salutations to You — Whereas His Majesty Lunalilo departed this life at the hour of nine o'clock last night; and by his death the Throne of Hawaii is left vacant, and the nation is without a head or a guide. In this juncture it is proper that we should seek for a Sovereign and Leader, and doing so, follow the course prescribed by Article 22nd of the Constitution. My earnest desire is for the perpetuity of the Crown and the permanent independence of the government and people of Hawaii, on the basis of the equity, liberty, prosperity, progress and protection of the whole people.

It will be remembered that at the time of the election of the late lamented Sovereign, I put forward my own claim to the Throne of our beloved country, on Constitutional grounds — and it is upon those grounds only that I now prefer my claims, and call upon you to listen to my call, and request you to instruct your Representatives to consider, and weigh well, and to regard your choice to elect me, the oldest member of a family high in rank in the country.

Therefore, I, David Kalakaua, cheerfully call upon you, and respectfully ask you to grant me your support.

D. KALAKAUA

Iolani Palace, Feb. 4, 1874.

Queen Emma issued her proclamation the next day:

To the Hawaiian People:

Whereas, His late lamented Majesty Lunalilo died on the 3rd of February, 1874, without having publicly proclaimed a Successor to the Throne; and whereas, "His late Majesty did before his final sickness declare his wish and intention that the undersigned should be his Successor on the Throne of the Hawaiian Islands, and enjoined upon me not to decline the same under any circumstances; and whereas. "Many of the Hawaiian people have since the death of His Majesty urged me to place myself in nomination at the ensuing session of the Legislature; "Therefore, in view of the foregoing considerations and my duty to the people and to the memory of the late King, I do hereby announce and declare that I am a Candidate for the Throne of these Hawaiian Islands, and I request my beloved people throughout the group, to assemble peacefully ad orderly in their districts, and to give formal expression to their views on this important subject, and to instruct their Representatives in the coming session of the Legislature.

God Protect Hawaii!

Honolulu, Feb. 5, 1874.

EMMA KALELEONALANI.

Emma's candidacy was agreeable to many Native Hawaiians, not only because her husband was a member of the Kamehameha Dynasty, but because she was also closer in descent to Hawaii's first King, Kamehameha the Great, than her opponent. On foreign policy, she (like her husband) was pro-British, while Kalākaua, although pro-Hawaiian and somewhat pro-British, leaned more toward the Americans. She also strongly wished to stop Hawaii's dependence on US industry and give Native Hawaiians a more powerful voice in government. The people supported Emma, but the Legislative Assembly, which actually elected the monarch, favored Kalākaua, who won the election, 39 – 6. News of her defeat caused a large-scale riot in which 13 legislators supporting Kalākaua were injured; one, J. W. Lonoaea, died of his injuries.

To quell the civil unrest, US and British troops stationed on warships in Honolulu Harbor landed with the Hawaiian government's permission, and rioters were arrested.

After the election, Emma retired from public life. She came to recognize Kalākaua as the rightful king, but never spoke to his wife, Queen Kapiʻolani.

She was known affectionately as the "Old Queen". King Kalākaua left a seat for her at any royal occasion, even though she rarely attended.

== Friendship with Queen Victoria ==
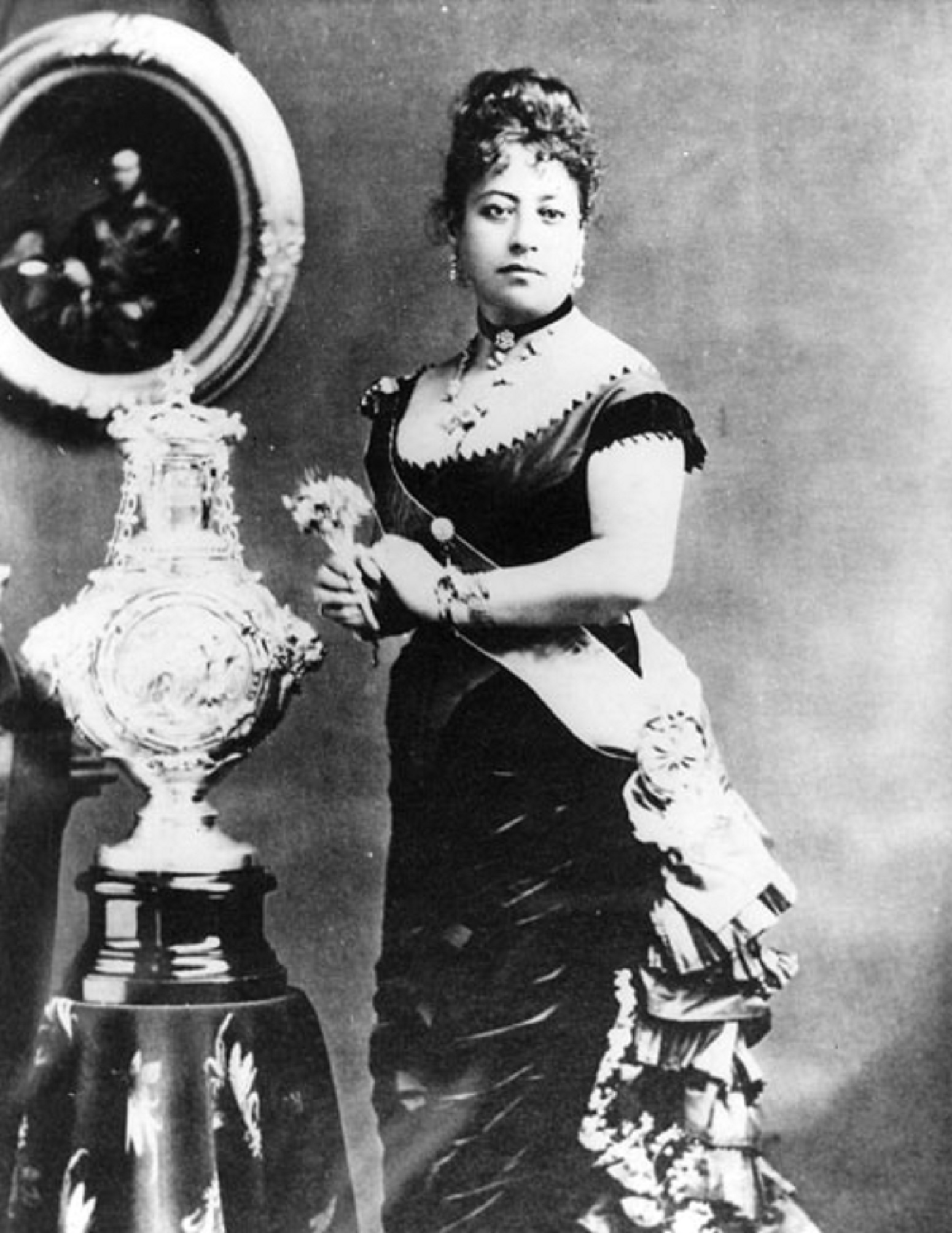
Emma and Queen Victoria silver christening cup

Despite the great differences in their kingdoms, Queen Emma and Queen Victoria became lifelong friends; both had lost sons and spouses. They exchanged letters, and Emma met Victoria for the first time on September 9, 1865, on her trip to England and later spent a night at Windsor Castle on November 27.

Queen Victoria recorded in her journal on the afternoon of September 9, 1865:

After luncheon I received Queen Emma, the widowed Queen of the Sandwich Islands or Hawaii. Met her in the Corridor & nothing could be nicer or more dignified than her manner. She is dark, but not more so than an Indian, with fine feathers [features?] & splendid soft eyes. She was dressed in just the same widow's weeds as I wear. I took her into the White Drawing room, where I asked to sit down next to me on the sofa. She was moved when I spoke to her of her great misfortune in losing her only child. She was very discreet & would only remain a few minutes. She presented her lady, Mrs. Hoopile whose husband is her Chaplain, both being Hawaiians....

== Death and legacy ==
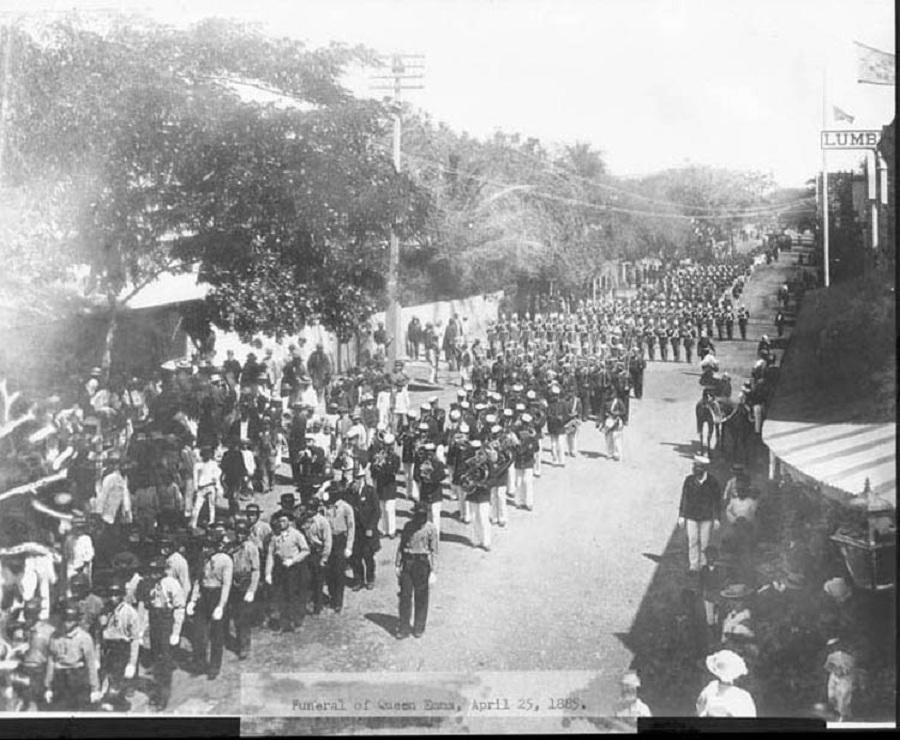
Funeral procession of Queen Emma, May 17, 1885.

In 1883, Emma suffered the first of several small strokes, and on April 25, 1885, she died at the age of 49.

At first she was laid in state at her house, but Alexander Cartwright and a few of his friends moved the casket to Kawaiahaʻo Church, saying her house was not large enough for the funeral. This was evidently not popular with those in charge of the church, since it was Congregational; Queen Emma had been a supporter of the Anglican Mission, and was an Episcopalian. Queen Liliʻuokalani said it "...showed no regard for the sacredness of the place". However, for the funeral service, Bishop Alfred Willis of the Anglican Church officiated in the Congregational church with his ritual. She was given a royal procession and was interred in the Royal Mausoleum of Hawaii known as Mauna ʻAla, next to her husband and son.

The Queen Emma Foundation was set up to provide continuous lease income for the hospital. Its landholding in the division known as the Queen Emma Land Company include the International Marketplace and Waikiki Town Center buildings. Some of the 40 year leases expire in 2010.

The area known as Fort Kamehameha in World War II, the site of several coastal artillery batteries, was the site of her former beach-front estate. After annexation it was acquired by the U.S. federal government in 1907.

The Emalani festival, Eo e Emalani i Alakaʻi held in October on the island of Kauaʻi in Koke'e State Park celebrates an 1871 visit.

=== Religious legacy ===
Together with her husband Kamehameha IV, Queen Emma is venerated in as a holy person in the Episcopal Church of the United States with a celebration on November 28. In Hawaiʻi the commemoration is called the Feast of the Holy Sovereigns. The rest of the Episcopal Church observes this as the feast day of Kamehameha and Emma, King and Queen of Hawaii, but does not use the name "Holy Sovereigns".

St. Mark's Episcopal Church in Honolulu was founded in 1908 in memory of Queen Emma to minister to the Kapahulu district of Honolulu and neighboring Waikīkī.

== Honours ==
- Dame Grand Cross of the Most Noble Order of Kamehameha I (04/02/1879).

== Family tree ==
Family tree

John Young (Hawaii) family tree

Keliʻimaikaʻi (died 1809)	Kalikoʻokalani	Kalaipaihala
Kaʻōanāʻeha (died 1850)
Henry C. Lewis	Fanny Kekelaokalani (1806–1880)	George Naʻea (1797–1852)
Mary Paʻaʻāina (1833–1853)	James Augustus Griswold (1823–?)	Dr. T. C. B. Rooke (1806–1858)
House of Kamehameha
Queen Emma (1836–1885)	Kamehameha IV (1836–1885)	Kamehameha III (1813–1854)
Albert Kamehameha (1858–1862)	Kiwalaʻo (died 1851)

Robert Young	Grace
Davis Family
John Young (1742–1835)	Namokuelua (died 1804)
Robert (1796–1813?)	Haʻale	James Kānehoa (1797–1851)	Sarah Kaniaulono (1797–1867)
Jane Lahilahi	Nuʻuanu
Grace Kamaʻikuʻi (1808–1866)	Governor Cox Keʻeaumoku (1784–1824)
Samuel Nuʻuanu
Jane Lahilahi (1813–1862)	Joshua Kaʻeo (c. 1808–1858)	Keoni Ana (1810–1857)	Julia Alapaʻi (died 1849)
Albert Kūnuiākea (1851–1903)	Mary Lonokahikini (1851–1904)	Peter Kekuaokalani (1836–1880)	Keliʻimaikaʻi "Alebada" (died 1851)

Notes:
- Apple, Russel A. (1978). "Appendix A: Young Family Geneology". Pahukanilua: Homestead of John Young: Kawaihae, Kohala, Island of Hawaiʻi : Historical Data Section of the Historic Structure Report. Honolulu: National Park Office, Hawaii State Office. pp. 39–41. OCLC 4962701.
- "John Young's Family". The Daily Bulletin. Vol. XV, no. 51. Honolulu. March 2, 1891. p. 2.
- Kanahele, George S. (1999). Emma: Hawaii's Remarkable Queen. Honolulu: University of Hawaii Press. p. 5. ISBN 978-0-8248-2240-8. OCLC 40890919.
- McKinzie, Edith Kawelohea (1983). Stagner, Ishmael W. (ed.). Hawaiian Genealogies: Extracted from Hawaiian Language Newspapers. Vol. 1. Honolulu: University of Hawaii Press. pp. 38–39. ISBN 0-939154-28-5. OCLC 12555087.

== See also ==
- Hānaiakamalama (Queen Emma Summer Palace)
- The Queen's Medical Center

== Bibliography ==
- Allen, Helena G. (1982). The Betrayal of Liliuokalani: Last Queen of Hawaii, 1838–1917. Glendale, CA: Arthur H. Clark Company. ISBN 978-0-87062-144-4. OCLC 9576325.
- Apple, Russel A. (1978). "Appendix A: Young Family Geneology". Pahukanilua: Homestead of John Young: Kawaihae, Kohala, Island of Hawaiʻi : Historical Data Section of the Historic Structure Report. Honolulu: National Park Office, Hawaii State Office. pp. 39–41. OCLC 4962701.
- Cahill, Emmett (1999). The Life and Times of John Young: Confidant and Advisor to Kamehameha the Great. Aiea HI: Island Heritage Publishing. ISBN 978-0-89610-449-5. OCLC 42656570.
- Cooke, Amos Starr; Cooke, Juliette Montague (1937). Richards, Mary Atherton (ed.). The Chiefs' Children School: A Record Compiled from the Diary and Letters of Amos Starr Cooke and Juliette Montague Cooke, by Their Granddaughter Mary Atherton Richards. Honolulu: Honolulu Star-Bulletin. OCLC 1972890.
- Cracroft, Sophia; Franklin, Jane; Queen Emma (1958). Korn, Alfons L. (ed.). The Victorian Visitors: An Account of the Hawaiian Kingdom, 1861–1866, Including the Journal Letters of Sophia Cracroft: Extracts from the Journals of Lady Franklin, and Diaries and Letters of Queen Emma of Hawaii (PDF). Honolulu: University of Hawaii Press. hdl:10125/39981. ISBN 978-0-87022-421-8. OCLC 8989368. Archived from the original (PDF) on February 5, 2021.
- Dabagh, Jean; Lyons, Curtis Jere; Hitchcock, Harvey Rexford (1974). Dabagh, Jean (ed.). "A King is Elected: One Hundred Years Ago" (PDF). The Hawaiian Journal of History. 8. Honolulu: Hawaiian Historical Society: 76–89. hdl:10524/112. OCLC 60626541.
- Forbes, David W., ed. (2001). Hawaiian National Bibliography, 1780–1900, Volume 3: 1851–1880. Vol. 3. Honolulu: University of Hawaii Press. ISBN 978-0-8248-2503-4. OCLC 123279964.
- Forbes, David W., ed. (2003). Hawaiian National Bibliography, 1780–1900, Volume 4: 1881–1900. Vol. 4. Honolulu: University of Hawaii Press. ISBN 978-0-8248-2636-9. OCLC 123279964.
- Haley, James L. (2014). Captive Paradise: A History of Hawaii. New York: St. Martin's Press. ISBN 978-0-312-60065-5. OCLC 865158092.
- Hackler, Rhoda E. A. (1988). ""My Dear Friend": Letters of Queen Victoria and Queen Emma". The Hawaiian Journal of History. 22. Honolulu: Hawaiian Historical Society: 101–130. hdl:10524/202. OCLC 60626541.
- Hackler, Rhoda E. A. (1992). "Albert Edward Kauikeaouli Leiopapa a Kamehameha, Prince of Hawai'i". The Hawaiian Journal of History. 26. Honolulu: Hawaiian Historical Society: 21–44. hdl:10524/349. OCLC 60626541.
- Inglis, Kerri A. (2013). Ma'i Lepera: A History of Leprosy in Nineteenth-Century Hawai'i. Honolulu, HI: University of Hawaii Press. ISBN 978-0-8248-6579-5.
- Kaeo, Peter; Queen Emma (1976). Korn, Alfons L. (ed.). News from Molokai, Letters Between Peter Kaeo & Queen Emma, 1873–1876. Honolulu: The University Press of Hawaii. hdl:10125/39980. ISBN 978-0-8248-0399-5. OCLC 2225064.
- Kaeppler, Adrienne L. (1972). "Acculturation in Hawaiian Dance". Yearbook of the International Folk Music Council. 4. Cambridge University Press: 42–44. doi:10.2307/767671. JSTOR 767671.
- Kam, Ralph Thomas (2017). Death Rites and Hawaiian Royalty: Funerary Practices in the Kamehameha and Kalakaua Dynasties, 1819–1953. S. I.: McFarland, Incorporated, Publishers. ISBN 978-1-4766-6846-8. OCLC 966566652.
- Kam, Ralph Thomas (2024). "The European Suitors of Queen Emma". The Hawaiian Journal of History. 58. Honolulu: Hawaiian Historical Society: 27–48. doi:10.1353/hjh.2024.a946410 – via Project MUSE.
- Kamakau, Samuel (1992) [1961]. Ruling Chiefs of Hawaii (Revised ed.). Honolulu: Kamehameha Schools Press. ISBN 0-87336-014-1. OCLC 25008795.
- Kanahele, George S. (1999). Emma: Hawaii's Remarkable Queen. Honolulu: University of Hawaii Press. ISBN 978-0-8248-2240-8. OCLC 40890919.
- Kanahele, George S. (2002) [1986]. Pauahi: The Kamehameha Legacy. Honolulu: Kamehameha Schools Press. ISBN 978-0-87336-005-0. OCLC 173653971.
- Kuykendall, Ralph Simpson (1953). The Hawaiian Kingdom, 1854–1874, Twenty Critical Years. Vol. 2. Honolulu: University of Hawaii Press. ISBN 978-0-87022-432-4.
- Kuykendall, Ralph Simpson (1967). The Hawaiian Kingdom 1874–1893, The Kalakaua Dynasty. Vol. 3. Honolulu: University of Hawaii Press. ISBN 978-0-87022-433-1. OCLC 500374815.
- Kyōkai, Nichi-Bei; Johnston, James D. (1920). The First Japanese Embassy to the United States of America: Sent to Washington in 1860 as the First of the Series of Embassies Specially Sent Abroad by the Tokugawa Shogunate. Tokyo: The America-Japan Society.
- Law, Anwei Skinsnes (2012). Kalaupapa: A Collective Memory (Ka Hokuwelowelo). Honolulu: University of Hawaii Press. ISBN 978-0-8248-6580-1. OCLC 830023588.
- Liliuokalani (1898). Hawaii's Story by Hawaii's Queen, Liliuokalani. Boston: Lee and Shepard. ISBN 978-0-548-22265-2. OCLC 2387226.
- Lydecker, Robert Colfax, ed. (1918). Roster Legislatures of Hawaii, 1841–1918. Honolulu: Hawaiian Gazette Company. OCLC 60737418.
- McKinzie, Edith Kawelohea (1983). Stagner, Ishmael W. (ed.). Hawaiian Genealogies: Extracted from Hawaiian Language Newspapers. Vol. 1. Honolulu: University of Hawaii Press. ISBN 0-939154-28-5. OCLC 12555087.
- McKinzie, Edith Kawelohea (1986). Stagner, Ishmael W. (ed.). Hawaiian Genealogies: Extracted from Hawaiian Language Newspapers. Vol. 2. Honolulu: University of Hawaii Press. ISBN 978-0-939154-37-1. OCLC 12555087.
- Osorio, Jon Kamakawiwoʻole (2002). Dismembering Lāhui: A History of the Hawaiian Nation to 1887. Honolulu: University of Hawaii Press. ISBN 978-0-8248-2549-2. OCLC 48579247.
- Parker, David "Kawika" (2008). "Crypts of the Ali`i The Last Refuge of the Hawaiian Royalty". Tales of Our Hawaiʻi (PDF). Honolulu: Alu Like, Inc. OCLC 309392477. Archived from the original (PDF) on November 11, 2013.
- Peterson, Barbara Bennett, ed. (1984). Notable Women of Hawaii. Honolulu: University of Hawaii Press. ISBN 978-0-8248-0820-4. OCLC 11030010.
- Pratt, Elizabeth Kekaaniauokalani Kalaninuiohilaukapu (1920). History of Keoua Kalanikupuapa-i-nui: Father of Hawaii Kings, and His Descendants, with Notes on Kamehameha I, First King of All Hawaii. Honolulu: Honolulu Star-Bulletin. OCLC 154181545.
- Restarick, Henry Bond (1924). Hawaii, 1778–1920, from the Viewpoint of a Bishop: Being the Story of English and American Churchmen in Hawaii with Historical Sidelights. Honolulu: Paradise of the Pacific. OCLC 1337282.
- Rose, Roger G.; Conant, Sheila; Kjellgren, Eric P. (September 1993). "Hawaiian Standing Kāhili in the Bishop Museum: An Ethnological and Biological Analysis". Journal of the Polynesian Society. 102 (3). Wellington, NZ: Polynesian Society: 273–304. JSTOR 20706518.
- Rossi, Pualiʻiliʻimaikalani (December 2013). No Ka Pono ʻOle O Ka Lehulehu: The 1874 Election of Hawaiʻi's Moʻi And The Kanaka Maoli Response (PDF) (MA thesis). Honolulu: University of Hawaii at Manoa. hdl:10125/100744.
- Seward, William Henry; Seward, Frederick William (1891). Autobiography of William H. Seward, from 1801 to 1834: With a Memoir of His Life, and Selections from His Letters from 1831 to 1846. New York: D. Appleton and Company. pp. 333–337. OCLC 4112122.
- Tsai, Tiffany Ing (2016). "The 1873 Election in Hawaiʻi between Prince William Charles Lunalilo and the Other Candidate". The Hawaiian Journal of History. 50 (50). Honolulu: Hawaiian Historical Society: 53–73. doi:10.1353/hjh.2016.0002. hdl:10524/59459. OCLC 60626541. S2CID 164663327 – via Project MUSE.
- Van Dyke, Jon M. (2008). Who Owns the Crown Lands of Hawaiʻi?. Honolulu: University of Hawaii Press. ISBN 978-0-8248-6560-3. OCLC 257449971 – via Project MUSE.
- Zambucka, Kristin (1977). The High Chiefess: Ruth Keelikolani. Honolulu: Mana Publishing Company. OCLC 3836213.
- Zambucka, Kristin (2002). Kalakaua: Hawaiʻi's Last King. Honolulu: Māna Publishing Company. ISBN 978-0-931897-04-7. OCLC 123305738.

Royal titles
Preceded by Kalama	Queen consort of Hawaiʻi; 1856–1863	Succeeded by Kapiʻolani
