= Thomas Nettleship Staley =

British missionary bishop

The Right Reverend Thomas Nettleship Staley SSC
- Bishop of Honolulu
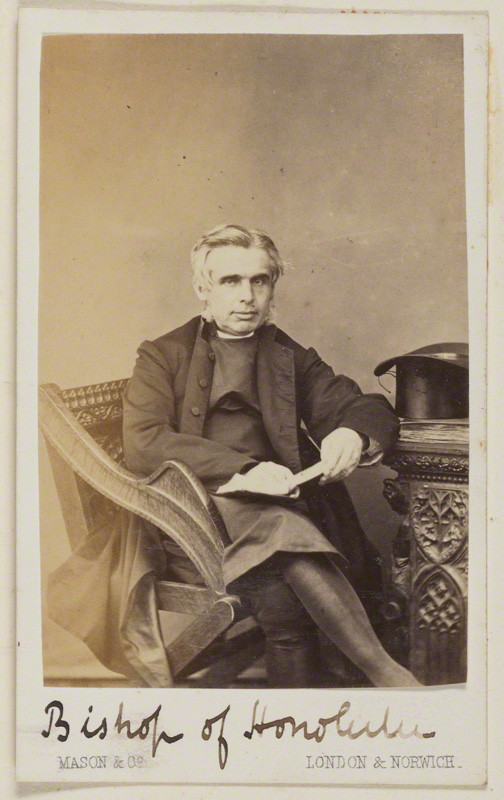
- Church: Church of England
- Diocese: Honolulu
- In office: 1862–1870
- Successor: Alfred Willis

Orders
- Ordination: 1846 (deacon); 1847 (priest)
- Consecration: 15 December 1861 by John Bird Sumner

Personal details
- Born: 17 January 1823 Sheffield, Yorkshire, England
- Died: 1 November 1898 (aged 75) Bournemouth, England
- Denomination: Anglican
- Spouse: Catherine Workman Shirley (m. 1850)

Thomas Nettleship Staley SSC (17 January 1823 – 1 November 1898) was a British bishop of the Church of England and the first Anglican bishop of the Church of Hawaii (called at the time Bishop of Honolulu).

== Life ==
Thomas Nettleship Staley was born 17 January 1823 in Sheffield, Yorkshire, England. His father was the Wesleyan minister William Staley. Staley entered Queens' College, Cambridge in 1840, earned his Bachelor of Arts degree in 1844, and became a Fellow in 1847 after earning his Master of Arts degree. He was tutor at St Mark's College, Chelsea, from 1844 to 1848 and headmaster of St Mark's Practising School from 1848 to 1850 (whilst still lecturing in mathematics at St Mark's College) and then principal of the Collegiate School, Wandsworth, from 1850 to 1861. He married Catherine Workman Shirley in September 1850.

He was appointed by John Bird Sumner, the Archbishop of Canterbury, and consecrated on 15 December 1861, at the suggestion of Samuel Wilberforce and Queen Victoria, as the church's first Bishop of Honolulu, for the Kingdom of Hawaii. He and his wife departed on 17 August 1862 and arrived in Honolulu in October 1862, several weeks after the death of Albert, Prince of Hawaii, the only son of King Kamehameha IV and Queen Emma Kaleleonālani Naʻea.

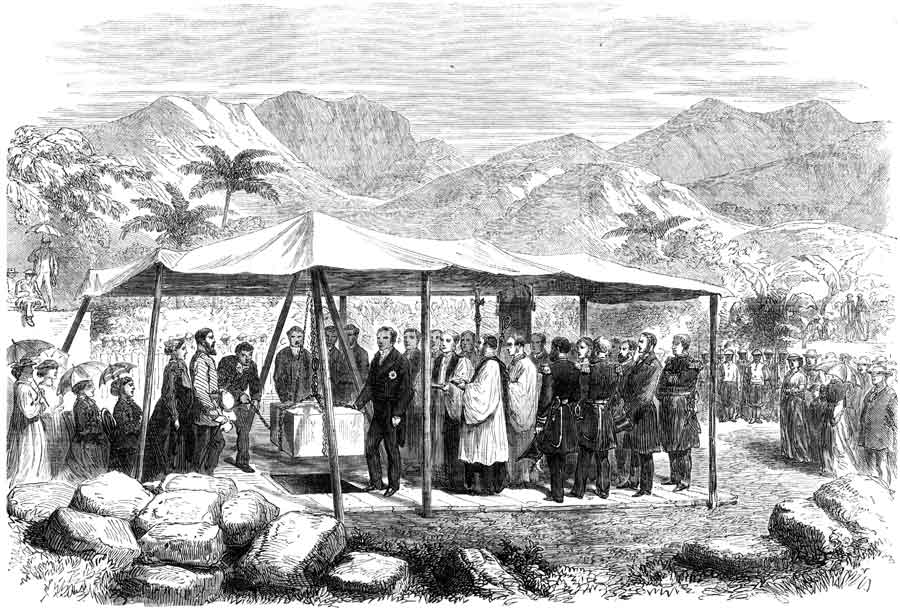
Cornerstone of St Andrew's Cathedral laid in 1867

His presence provoked conflict with the American Board of Commissioners for Foreign Missions because they considered him a symbol of ritualism. The fact that he was a bishop also bothered the Calvinists who disliked any kind of religious hierarchy. In a letter to Rufus Anderson of the American Board, the British missionary William Ellis (who had visited the Hawaiian Islands in 1825) wrote that Staley was "associated with that section of the Church of England from which the greatest number of perverts to Popery has proceeded, and between whom and the Roman Catholics the difference is reported to be slight ..." Even the American writer Mark Twain criticized Staley as an agent of Britain.

Staley publicly defended his actions as being non-political, but was considered symbolic of the struggle for influence on the islands. Although he was appointed to the King's Privy Council 1863–1864 and Board of Education in 1865, he denied ever giving political advice, or being behind any plots leading to British colonization of the islands. In December 1863 he held the memorial service for Kamehameha IV and later dedicated the Royal Mausoleum where the royal family was reburied. The next King Kamehameha V continued his support and the cornerstone for the Cathedral Church of Saint Andrew was laid in a ceremony in March 1867. On 13 June 1865, his young daughter was baptised at a temporary cathedral in Honolulu.

Staley began two church-operated boarding schools: Saint Andrew's Priory School for Girls and ʻIolani School in Honolulu (originally named for Saint Alban). Staley was appointed Chaplain of Hawaii's Royal Order of Kamehameha I.

He corresponded with Charles Darwin regarding the decline in population of the native Hawaiians.

Staley was frustrated with the political struggle and suggested he would like to resign. He hoped to be replaced by an American Episcopal bishop, but none could be found. He reluctantly retired in 1870 and was replaced by Alfred Willis; he was reported on 25 February to have already tendered his resignation. He resided in Croxall and died on 1 November 1898 at Bournemouth.

== Publications ==
- Thomas Nettleship Staley (1868). Five Years' Church Work in the Kingdom of Hawaii. Rivington, London.

== See also ==
- Father Damien, the leper priest, for context on the struggles between Christian denominations in Hawaii

Religious titles
New creation	Bishop of Honolulu; 1861–1870	Succeeded by Alfred Willis
