= Henry Bond Restarick =

The Right Reverend Henry Bond Restarick
- Bishop of Hawaii
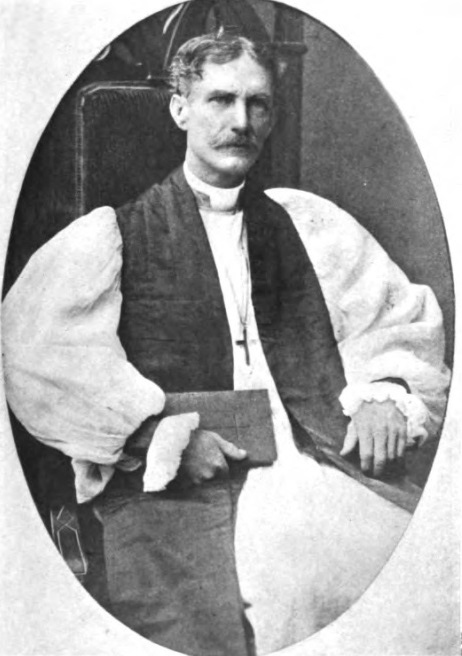
- Church: Episcopal Church
- Diocese: Hawaii
- Elected: April 17, 1902
- In office: 1902–1920
- Predecessor: Alfred Willis
- Successor: John Dominique LaMothe

Orders
- Ordination: June 1882 by William Stevens Perry
- Consecration: July 2, 1902 by William Ford Nichols

Personal details
- Born: December 26, 1854 Holcombe, Somerset, England
- Died: December 8, 1933 (aged 78) Honolulu, Hawaii, US
- Buried: O'ahu Cemetery, Honolulu
- Denomination: Anglican
- Parents: Edwin Restarick & Amelia Ryall Webb
- Spouse: Mary Lottie Baker
- Children: Ethel Constance, Arthur Edwin, Margaret Frances

Henry Bond Restarick (December 26, 1854 – December 8, 1933) was the first American bishop of the Episcopal Diocese of Hawaii.

== Biography ==
He was born in Holcombe, Somerset, England, the son of Edwin Restarick and Amelia Ryall Webb. He was educated at King James Collegiate School in Bridgwater, England, after which, in 1872, he emigrated to the United States. He worked as a farm hand and then a country school teacher, before studying at Griswold College in Davenport, Iowa, from where he graduated with a Bachelor of Arts in 1882. He was ordained deacon in 1881 and priest in 1882. In 1881, he was appointed curate of Trinity Church in Muscatine, Iowa, while in 1882, he became rector of St Paul's Church in San Diego, California, where he remained till 1902.

He was elected Bishop of Hawaii on April 17, 1902, and was consecrated on July 2, 1902 by the Bishop of California William Ford Nichols. He resigned on October 27, 1920. He was also editor of the Hawaiian Church Chronicle, trustee and president of the Hawaiian Historical Society, and president of the Library of Hawaii, a post which he held from 1927 to 1931.
