= Alfred Willis =

Anglican Bishop of Honolulu

The Right Reverend Alfred Charles Willis
- Bishop of Honolulu
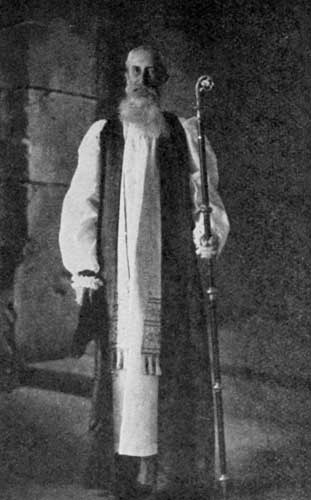
- Church: Church of England
- Diocese: Honolulu
- In office: 1870–1902
- Predecessor: Thomas Nettleship Staley
- Successor: Henry Bond Restarick
- Other post: Missionary Bishop in Tonga (1902–1920)

Orders
- Ordination: 1860
- Consecration: 2 February 1872 by Archibald Campbell Tait

Personal details
- Born: 3 February 1836 Braceborough, Lincolnshire, England
- Died: 14 November 1920 (aged 84) Milford on Sea, Hampshire, England
- Denomination: Anglican
- Parents: Francis Willis & Henrietta Lowe
- Spouse: Emma Mary Simeon (m. 1883)
- Education: St John's College, Oxford

Alfred Charles Willis (3 February 1836 – 14 November 1920) was an Anglican missionary bishop and author in the late 19th and early 20th centuries. He served as the second bishop of the Church of Hawaii from 1872 until 1902, when the church was converted into the Episcopal Diocese of Hawaii.

== Biography ==
Willis was born on February 3, 1836, in the village of Greatford in Lincolnshire, England. His father, Francis, was a doctor. Willis attended Uppingham School and later St John's College, Oxford. He earned a bachelor's degree from Oxford in 1858 and a master's degree in 1864, later being granted an honorary doctorate in 1872.

Willis was ordained a deacon in Rochester in 1859 and was made priest the following year. He initially served as a perpetual curate of a parish in Brompton, where he became vicar in 1871. On February 2, 1872, Willis was made a bishop. Shortly thereafter, Willis departed for Honolulu, where he became only the second bishop of the Church of Hawaii.

In 1893, after Queen Liliʻuokalani was deposed during the overthrow of the Hawaiian Kingdom, Willis confirmed her into the Church of Hawaii.

Willis resigned from his post as bishop in 1902 and was succeeded by Henry Bond Restarick (as first bishop of the Episcopal Diocese of Hawaii). Willis spent time in a variety of pacific islands before eventually returning to England in 1920. Willis was the first Anglican missionary to visit Tonga, in 1902, where he started the Anglican Church in Tonga.

Willis married Emma Simeon on September 5, 1883. He died on November 14, 1920 in Milford on Sea.
