= Oroku =

Oroku 小禄村
- Former municipality
- Location in Japan
- Coordinates: 26°11′14.9″N 127°40′6.5″E
- Country: Japan
- Region: Kyushu
- Prefecture: Okinawa Prefecture
- Merged: 1 September 1954 (now part of Naha)

Area
  - Total: 11.1 km^{2} (4.3 sq mi)
- Time zone: UTC+09:00 (JST)

Oroku (小禄; Okinawan: ウルク Uruku) is a district on the southern edge of the city of Naha, the capital of Okinawa Prefecture in southern Japan. It was formerly a village independent from Naha, but it was incorporated into the city in 1954. The village hosted an airfield used by the Imperial Japanese Navy Air Service beginning in 1933. A base, presumably the former Navy Air base, was held by the US military in the village until Okinawa was returned to Japan. After the installation was handed over, it was converted into a base for the Japan Ground Self-Defense Force.
