= Saints Constantine and Helen Greek Orthodox Cathedral of the Pacific (Honolulu) =

Greek Orthodox cathedral in Honolulu

Sts. Constantine and Helen Cathedral
- Saints Constantine and Helen Greek Orthodox Cathedral of the Pacific
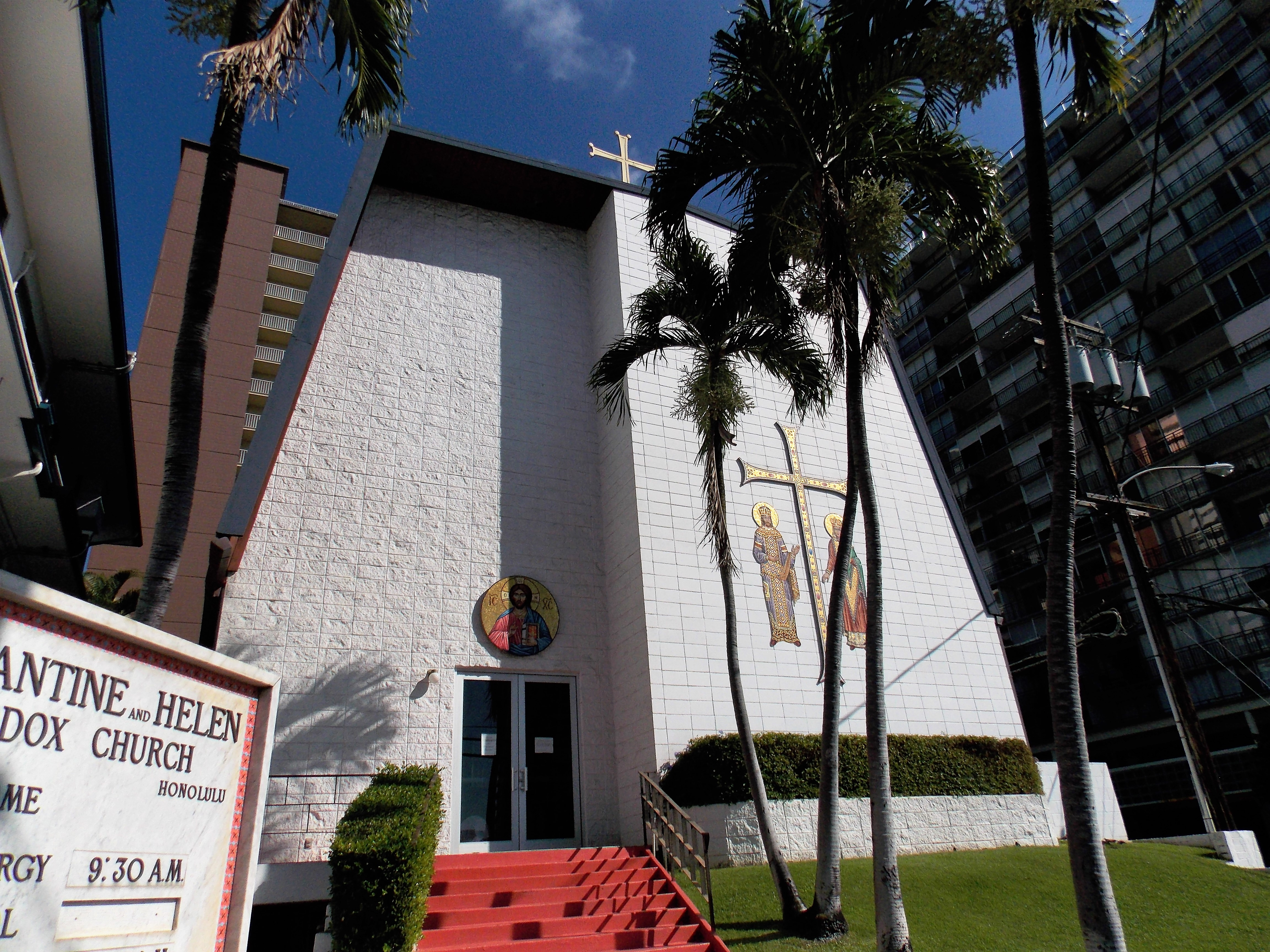
- Front view of the Cathedral
- Sts. Constantine and Helen Cathedral
- 21°18′21″N 157°50′50″W
- Location: Honolulu, Hawaii
- Country: United States
- Denomination: Greek Orthodox

History
- Status: cathedral
- Founded: 1969
- Consecrated: 1990

Administration
- Archdiocese: Greek Orthodox Archdiocese of America

Saints Constantine and Helen Greek Orthodox Cathedral of the Pacific is a Greek Orthodox cathedral in Honolulu, Hawaii.

== History ==
In 1965 Archbishop Iakovos of America of the Greek Orthodox Archdiocese of America celebrated the first divine liturgy in Honolulu. The first congregation, named Saints Constantine and Helen Greek Orthodox Church, was established in 1969 by Father Dean Gigicos at 17 Old Pali Place. The church was named after Constantine the Great and St. Helena. By the 1980s the congregation grew and relocated to a larger facility. The current location of the cathedral was purchased by the Greek Orthodox Archdiocese in 1988. The church was consecrated in 1990 by Archbishop Iakovos, assisted by two Metropolitan bishops, two bishops, two priests, and an archdeacon.

The cathedral's congregation is made up of Greek, Slavic, and Arabic Orthodox Christians, as well as local converts. The primary services are in English, Greek, and Slavonic.

The parish hosts an annual Greek Festival at Ala Moana Beach Park near Waikiki.
