= Harry S. Kennedy =

American Episcopal/Anglican bishop

The Right Reverend Harry Sherbourne Kennedy
- Bishop of Hawaii
- Church: Episcopal Church
- Diocese: Hawaii
- Elected: 1943
- In office: 1944–1966
- Predecessor: S. Harrington Littell
- Successor: Lani Hanchett

Orders
- Ordination: June 27, 1926 by Robert H. Mize Sr.
- Consecration: January 11, 1944 by Henry St. George Tucker; Fred Ingley (co-consecrator); Walter Mitchell (co-consecrator)

Personal details
- Born: August 21, 1901 Brooklyn, New York, United States
- Died: February 14, 1986 (aged 84) Honolulu, Hawaii, United States
- Denomination: Anglican
- Parents: David Eakins Kennedy & Ida Louise Hargreaves
- Spouse: Katharine Jane Kittle
- Children: 5
- Education: Colorado State University

Harry Sherbourne Kennedy (August 21, 1901 – February 14, 1986) was a bishop of Hawaii in the Episcopal Church from 1944 till 1966.

== Early life and education ==
Kennedy was born in Brooklyn, New York on August 21, 1901 and was raised in Rahway, New Jersey. In 1925, he received his B.A. from Colorado State University and prepared for the ministry at St John's Theological College, in Greeley, Colorado. He also received honorary degrees including a Doctor of Divinity from Seabury-Western Theological Seminary in Evanston, Illinois in 1943; a Doctor of Sacred Theology from the Church Divinity School of the Pacific in Berkeley, California in 1944; another Doctor of Divinity from Trinity College in Hartford, Connecticut in 1957; and a Doctor of Humane Letters from Colorado College, Colorado Springs, Colorado in 1967.

== Ministry ==
Kennedy was ordained deacon December 27, 1925 and priest on June 27, 1926 by Robert H. Mize, Missionary Bishop of Western Kansas. He then became rector of Epiphany Church in Concordia, Kansas and priest-in-charge of St James' Church in Belleville, Kansas and St John's Church in Mankato, Kansas. In 1929, he became rector of St Thomas' Church in Alamosa, Colorado and a missionary in the San Luis Valley. From 1933 till 1937, he was rector of St Thomas' Church in Denver and between 1937 and 1943, 1933-37 rector of Grace Church in Colorado Springs, Colorado. Subsequently, he was also a chaplain in the United States Army between 1942 and 1943. He was elected Missionary Bishop of Hawaii in 1943 and consecrated on January 11, 1944 at Grace Church. In 1964, Elizabeth II made him a Commander of the Order of the British Empire for his service to Armed Forces personnel of the United Kingdom and British Commonwealth. He retired in 1966 and died at The Queen's Medical Center in Honolulu, Hawaii.
