= Robert Fitzpatrick (bishop) =

American bishop (born 1958)

The Right Reverend Robert LeRoy Fitzpatrick
- Bishop of Hawaii
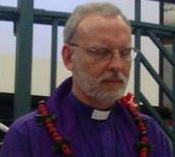
- Church: Episcopal Church
- Diocese: Hawaii
- Elected: October 20, 2006
- In office: 2007–present
- Predecessor: Richard Sui On Chang
- Previous post: Canon to the Ordinary of the Diocese of Hawaii (2000-2007)

Orders
- Ordination: 1986
- Consecration: March 10, 2007 by Katharine Jefferts Schori

Personal details
- Born: September 20, 1958 (age 67) Decatur, Illinois, United States
- Denomination: Anglican
- Spouse: Beatrice Elizondo Fitzpatrick
- Children: 2
- Education: DePauw University (BA); General Theological Seminary (M. Div.); Seabury-Western Theological Seminary (D. Min.)

Robert "Bob" LeRoy Fitzpatrick (born September 20, 1958) is an American bishop of the Episcopal Church, who is the current Bishop of Hawaii.

== Early life and education ==
He was born on September 20, 1958, in Decatur, Illinois. He received a Bachelor of Arts degree from DePauw University in 1981, a Master of Divinity degree from the General Theological Seminary, and a Doctor of Ministry in Homiletics degree from Seabury-Western Theological Seminary.

== Ordained ministry ==
After ordination to the priesthood in 1987, he served as assistant priest at St Peter’s Church in Morristown, New Jersey. In 1990, he became rector (priest-in-charge) of Grace Church in Fort Wayne, Indiana. In 2000, he was called to Hawaii and became a member of the staff of the Bishop of Hawaii, and then as Canon to the Ordinary (the bishop's executive officer) from 2002. He also served as the priest-in-charge of congregations in ʻAiea, Kapolei and Honolulu.

== Bishop ==
Fitzpatrick was elected Bishop of Hawaii on October 20, 2006, and was consecrated bishop and installed as ordinary of the diocese on March 10, 2007, by Presiding Bishop Katharine Jefferts Schori, with several international co-consecrators. Beginning in 2009, Fitzpatrick served as bishop in charge of the Episcopal Diocese of Micronesia.

On April 25, 2025, Fitzpatrick announced his plans to resign and called for a bishop election. On May 16, 2026, Fitzpatrick's successor Elizabeth “Libby” Berman was elected.

The bishop is married to Beatrice Elizondo Fitzpatrick. They have two adult sons together.

== See also ==
- List of Episcopal bishops of the United States
- Historical list of the Episcopal bishops of the United States
