= St. Andrew's Schools =

Location
- 224 Queen Emma Square; Honolulu, Hawaiʻi 96813; United States

Information
- Type: Girls, private, preparatory; Boys private; Preschool (co-ed)
- Motto: Kulia I Ka Nuʻu; Strive for the Highest
- Denomination: Episcopal Church
- Established: 1867
- Head of school: Ruth R. Fletcher, Ph.D.
- Grades: K-12
- Gender: Girls (K-12), boys (K-6), coed (preschool)
- Enrollment: 550 (approx.)
- Campus: Urban
- Colors: Red and White
- Athletics conference: Interscholastic League of Honolulu (ILH)
- Nickname: "Priory Pride"
- Newspaper: Ke Kukui
- Yearbook: Ka Alele
- Website: https://www.standrewsschools.org/

St. Andrew's Schools is a private K–12 school in Honolulu, Hawaii. Made up of The Priory, an all-girls K–12 program with a college preparatory school; The Prep, the all-boys K–5 program; and a co-educational preschool for ages 2–5 years in the Nu'uanu valley. Founded in 1867 by Queen Emma Kaleleonālani, wife of King Kamehameha IV, the schools enroll students in preschool through grade 12 year round. The enrollment is about 550, with a student-teacher ratio of 8 to 1. The school is affiliated with the Episcopal Church (United States). It is administered by a board of trustees and is the oldest all-girls school in Hawai'i. More than half the faculty have advanced degrees, and virtually 100% of graduates attend four-year colleges and universities across the country.

== History ==
Raised in the Anglican faith, Queen Emma recognized the educational needs of the young women of Hawaiʻi and founded St. Andrew's Priory so that Hawaiian girls would receive an education equivalent to what was traditionally offered only to boys. Her mission of establishing a girls' school in Honolulu took her to England to seek the counsel of the Archbishop of Canterbury. Under his authority, the Sisters of the Church of England returned to Hawaiʻi with Queen Emma to begin their work.

The school opened on Ascension Day, May 30, 1867, under the direction of Queen Emma and Mother Priscilla Lydia Sellon of the Society of the Most Holy Trinity of Devonport, Plymouth, England. In 1902, the Episcopal Church of the United States assumed administrative control of the school. Until 1969, the Priory was run by the Sisters of the American Order of the Transfiguration. Since 1969 the school has been led by a headmaster. Father Fred 'Fritz' G. Minuth was the Priory's first headmaster from 1969 until he was succeeded by Father David K. Kennedy in 1981. As of 2009 the headmaster was Sandra J. Theunick. The Priory Head of School is Ruth R. Fletcher, Ph.D. The Priory remains as an all-girls school.

In 1976, the school assumed non-profit corporation status with a board of trustees. The school's charter of incorporation provides a link with the Episcopal Church.

In 2013, the St. Andrew's Schools were formed, bringing St. Andrew's Priory School under one umbrella with the existing co-ed Queen Emma Preschool and the newly created St. Andrew's Preparatory School for Boys (The Prep) for boys in elementary school.

The school is located at 224 Queen Emma Square, 21°18′35″N 157°51′23″W and is named for the adjacent Saint Andrew's Cathedral, which was named for King Kamehameha IV (husband of Queen Emma Kaleleonālani), who died on November 30, 1863, the feast day of Saint Andrew.

The board of trustees is chaired by Dew-Anne Nishida Langcaon '81.

== Campus ==
The co-ed Queen Emma Preschool is located on Pali Highway. The single-gender lower, middle, and high schools are all located on the main downtown campus, located at 224 Queen Emma Square.

Buildings include: Centennial Hall, Jubinsky Hall, Kennedy Hall, Sellon Hall, Transfiguration Hall, and the James C. Castle Gymnasium which includes a dance studio.

== Traditions ==
Ascension Day Service
Each year, the Priory commemorates the school's founding with a service in St. Andrew's Cathedral, followed by the Coral Cross Ceremony at the school's historic 9-foot coral cross in the Robinson Courtyard, which is decorated by the junior class on Ascension Eve as a gift to the school in honor of the founders. The junior class traditionally stays overnight at the school to decorate the cross with flowers and lei, according to the theme chosen by the class.

Mauna 'Ala
This tradition celebrates Queen Emma's birthday on the school campus and at the Royal Mausoleum, the final resting place for several members of the Hawaiian monarchy. The entire school gathers in St. Andrew's Cathedral for a chapel service to honor the Queen. Following the all school service, Grades K–11 present ho’okupu at Queen Emma’s bust. Priory Seniors gather at Mauna ‘Ala for a second service which includes a wider community representation, including Priory Trustees, faculty, staff, parents, the Royal Order of Kamehameha and representatives of the Kamehameha Schools.

Queen Emma Ball
Named after St. Andrew’s Priory's founder, the annual Queen Emma Ball celebrates and recognizes honorees who are selected based on their commitment and contributions to education. Funds raised at the Queen Emma Ball go toward St. Andrew’s Priory students’ scholarships and financial aid, which 35 percent of students receive – one of the highest percentages awarded among private schools in Hawaii. The annual gala features live entertainment, dinner and a live and silent auction and honors outstanding community leaders who demonstrate the vision of Queen Emma.

== School organization ==
St. Andrew's Priory is divided into four sections:

- Queen Emma preschool (boys and girls ages 2–5)
- Lower School (girls, grades K–6, Co-ed From September 2026)
- Middle School (girls, grades 7–8, Co-ed From September 2026)
- High School (girls, grades 9–12, Co-ed From September 2026)

== Academics ==
High school students may earn college credit through the College Board's Advanced Placement (AP) program and through the Collegiate Advancement Program. AP courses are offered in biology, calculus, chemistry, English, world languages, physics, U.S. government, U.S. history, and many more. Through its Collegiate Advancement Program with Hawaii Pacific University, the Priory also offers the opportunity for qualified juniors and seniors to enroll without additional cost in college freshman-level courses.

== Accreditation and ranking ==
St. Andrew's Schools is accredited (K–12) by the Western Association of Schools and Colleges (WASC). In 2015, St. Andrew's earned the highest ranking of accreditation: a six-year with a mid-term report.

== Athletics ==
The school is a member of the Hawaii High School Athletic Association and the Interscholastic League of Honolulu, an athletic conference composed of Honolulu-area private schools. The Priory fields varsity teams in basketball, bowling, paddling, sailing, tennis, and volleyball, and is a member of Pac-5 in competitive cheer, cross-country, judo, kayaking, soccer, softball, swimming, track and field, water polo, and wrestling. St. Andrew's Priory is one of twenty-two smaller private schools that make up a larger unified team called Pac-5 Wolfpack, that allows the students to participate in certain high school athletic competition. Pac-Five was founded in 1974 to allow smaller private institutions (of 1000 or less students per school) to form a football team and compete at a varsity level with bigger schools. Now, Pac-5 competes in baseball, canoe paddling, cheerleading, cross-country, football, judo, kayaking, soccer, softball, swimming, tennis, track & field, water polo, and wrestling.

In 2004, the Priory's varsity basketball team won the Hawai'i High School Girls State Division II Basketball Championship.

== Other activities ==
=== Rocketry team ===
The school had the only rocketry team in the state. In 2008, the Priory team was the first team from Hawaii to qualify for the Team America Rocket Challenge (TARC), and they were one of only two all-girl teams in the national competition. Competing against 99 other teams nationwide, the Priory team took home top honors for "Best Presentation" and "Most Spirited Team". However, since 2011, the rocketry team has ceased to exist.

2008 TARC results:

=== State Science/Engineering Fair ===
In 2010, Kang-Ying (Connie) Liu ('11) won first place at the 53rd Hawaii State Science and Engineering Fair for her college graduate-level work in developing nine new equations to describe triangle inequalities. Liu competed in the Intel International Science and Engineering Fair, the world's largest international pre-college science competition.

At the 54th Hawaii State Science and Engineering Fair (2011), Priory students took home three of the top four prizes in a field of 77 schools. For the second year in a row, Kang-Ying (Connie) Liu ('11) took home first place in the state. The students competed against students from 55 countries in the Intel International Science and Engineering Fair in Los Angeles, California.

== Alumnae ==
- Caitlin Doughty (2002) — mortician, blogger
- Colleen Hanabusa (1969) — attorney, Hawaii state senator, 21st District, (1988-2010), Senate president (2007-2010); Member, U.S. House of Representatives (HI, Dist. #1) (2011–2015; 2016–present)
- Iolani Luahine (1935) — kumu hula, dancer, chanter, and teacher, high priestess of the ancient hula
