= Cathedral Church of Saint Andrew (Honolulu) =

Historic church in Hawaii, United States

St Andrew's Cathedral
- The Cathedral Church of Saint Andrew
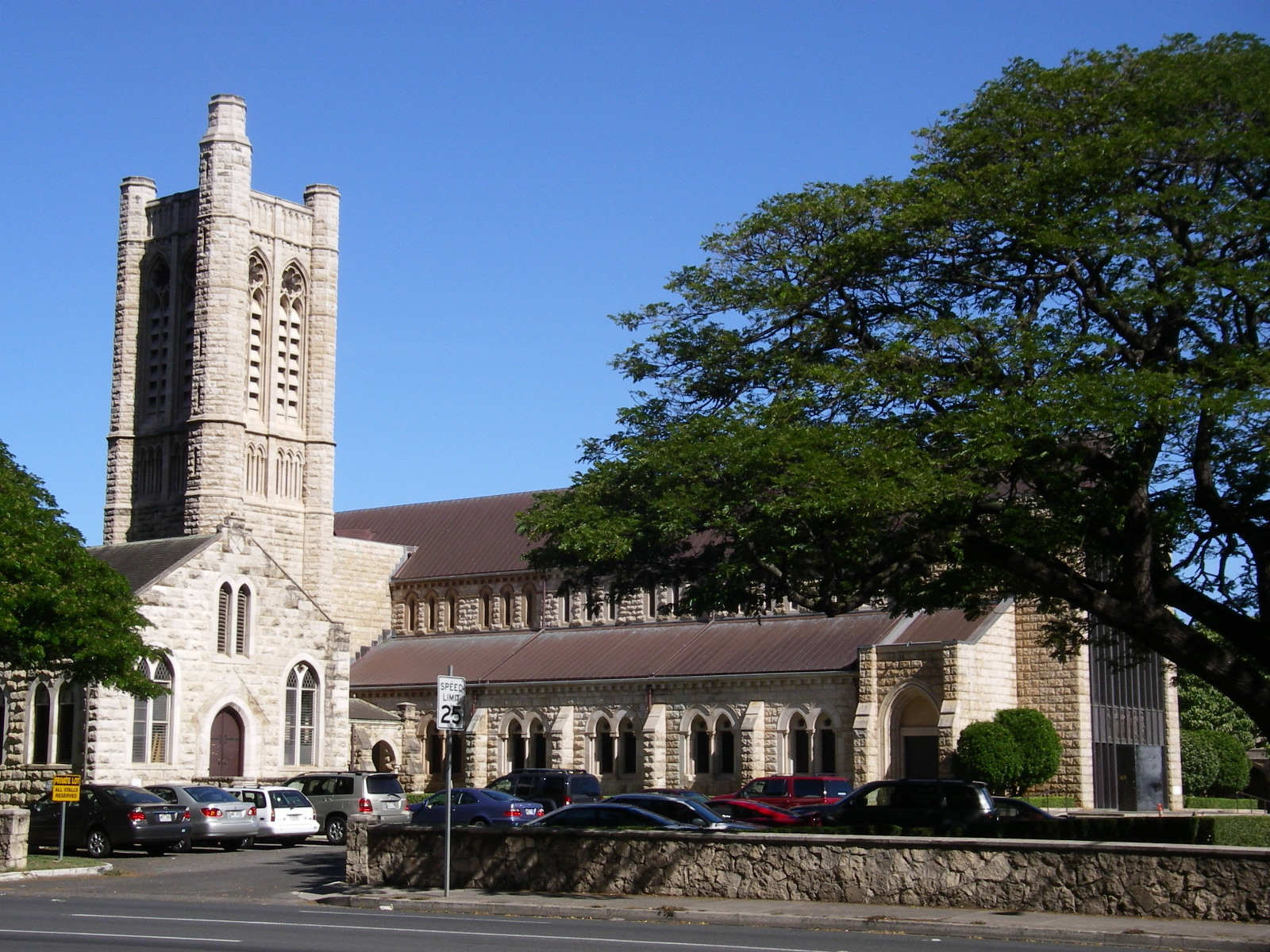
- St. Andrew's Cathedral from Queen Emma Street
- St Andrew's Cathedral
- Location: 229 Queen Emma Square; Honolulu, Hawaii
- Country: United States
- Denomination: Episcopal Church
- Website: www.cathedralhawaii.org

History
- Status: Cathedral
- Dedication: Andrew the Apostle
- Consecrated: March 9, 1902

Architecture
- Functional status: Active
- Architect(s): William Slater, Richard Carpenter
- Style: French Gothic/Gothic Revival
- Groundbreaking: March 5, 1867

Administration
- Province: VIII
- Diocese: Hawaii

Clergy
- Bishop: The Rt. Rev. Robert L. Fitzpatrick
- St. Andrew's Cathedral
- U.S. National Register of Historic Places
- U.S. Historic district – Contributing property
- Location within Hawaii
- Location: Beretania Street (Queen Emma Square), Honolulu, Hawaii
- Coordinates: 21°18′35″N 157°51′26″W
- Area: 7 acres (2.8 ha)
- Part of: Hawaii Capital Historic District (ID78001020)
- NRHP reference No.: 73000663
- Added to NRHP: July 2, 1973

The Cathedral Church of Saint Andrew, also commonly known as St. Andrew's Cathedral, is a cathedral of the Episcopal Church in the United States located in the State of Hawaii. Originally the seat of the Anglican Church of Hawaii, it is now the home of the bishop of the Episcopal Diocese of Hawaii. It is affiliated with St. Andrew's Schools, which consists of the main girls' K-12 school, the coeducational Queen Emma Preschool and a boys' preparatory school (elementary).

The cathedral reported 791 members in 2015 and 351 members in 2023. Plate and pledge income for the congregation in 2024 was $330,618 with average Sunday attendance (ASA) of 187. This was a relative decrease from ASA of 275 reported in 2015.

== History ==
Kamehameha IV and Queen Emma, his queen consort, were devout members of the Church of England led by their good friend Queen Victoria. At their request, Thomas Nettleship Staley was appointed bishop in 1862. Inspired to build a place of worship in the Anglican tradition, Kamehameha IV commissioned the construction of what would later become the Cathedral of Saint Andrew. However, the king died on the feast day of Saint Andrew in 1863 before ground-breaking. Kamehameha V, the king's brother, took over the project and laid the cornerstone in honor of his predecessor on March 5, 1867. The cathedral was designed by the London architects William Slater and R. H. Carpenter, and the building process was overseen by their chief assistant Benjamin Ingelow.

The Cathedral of Saint Andrew was built in the French Gothic architectural style, shipped in several prefabricated pieces from England. The western facade has a window of hand-blown stained glass that reaches from the floor to the eaves, depicting the European explorers that visited the Hawaiian Islands.

There are three other cathedrals in the Hawaiian Islands — Cathedral Basilica of Our Lady of Peace, Saints Constantine and Helen Greek Orthodox Cathedral of the Pacific of the Greek Orthodox Archdiocese of America and the Co-Cathedral of Saint Theresa of the Child Jesus of the Roman Catholic Diocese of Honolulu.

It is located on Queen Emma Street, between Beretania Street and Queen Emma Square. It was added to the National Register of Historic Places listings in Oahu on July 2, 1973 as site 73000663.

== Bells ==
The Mackintosh Tower, completed in 1912, contains a set of eight bells hung for change ringing, and is the westernmost such tower in the United States and the world. The current bells, which predate the cathedral, came from St. Alkmund's Church, Shrewsbury, United Kingdom. They were cast in 1812 by John Briant (1748-1829), a bellfounder based in Hertford. They went unrung for many years due to that church's structural issues, and in 1972, facing redundancy, the bells were put up for sale. In 1990, the bells were removed from St Alkmund's Church to John Taylor & Co, who refurbished and retuned the bells to F♯. The bells, at the request of the donor, were also inscribed with the names of the Hawaiian monarchs. They were installed in 1991.

== Gallery ==
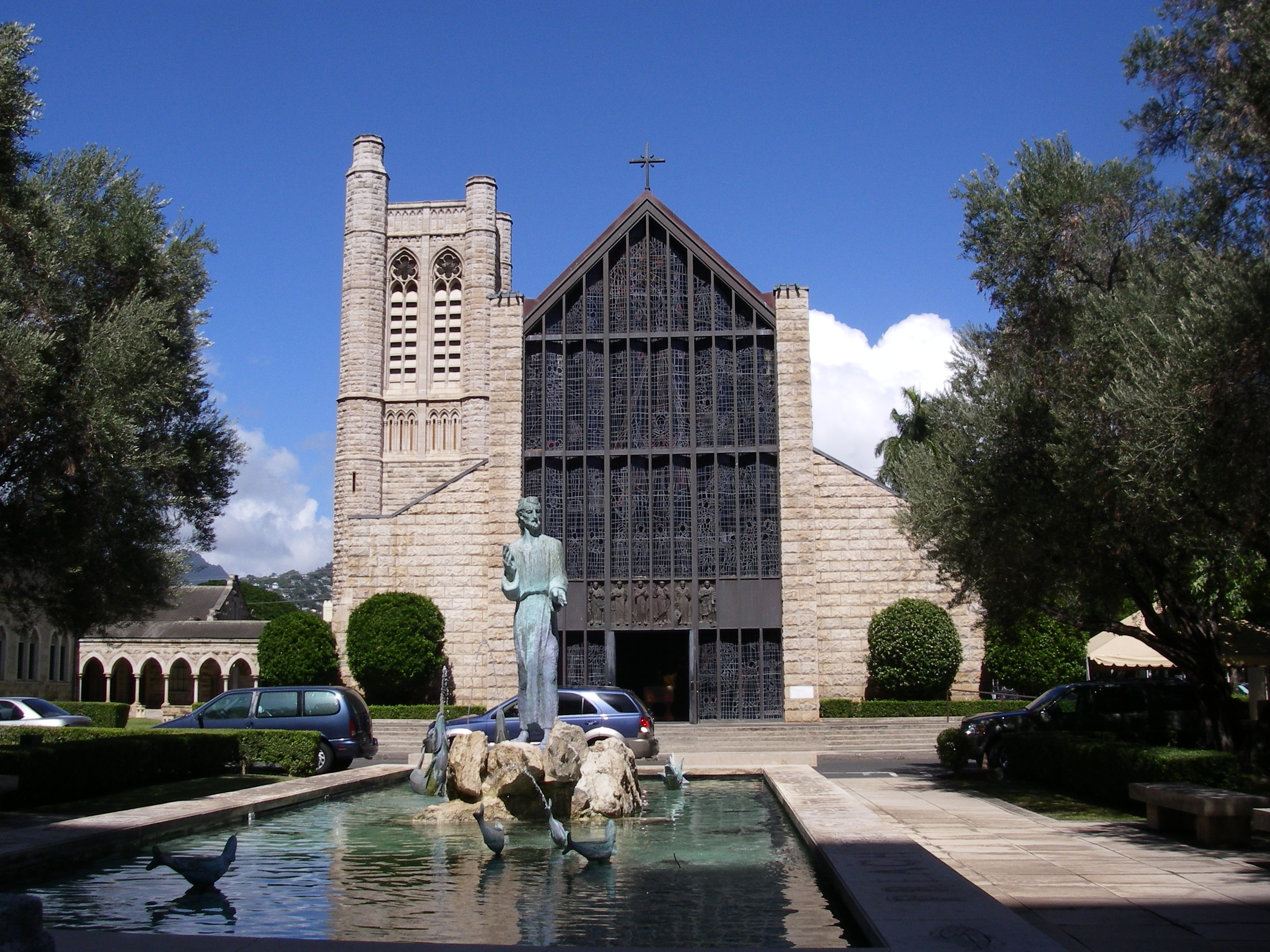
View of St. Andrew's statue, pool, olive trees, and front entrance

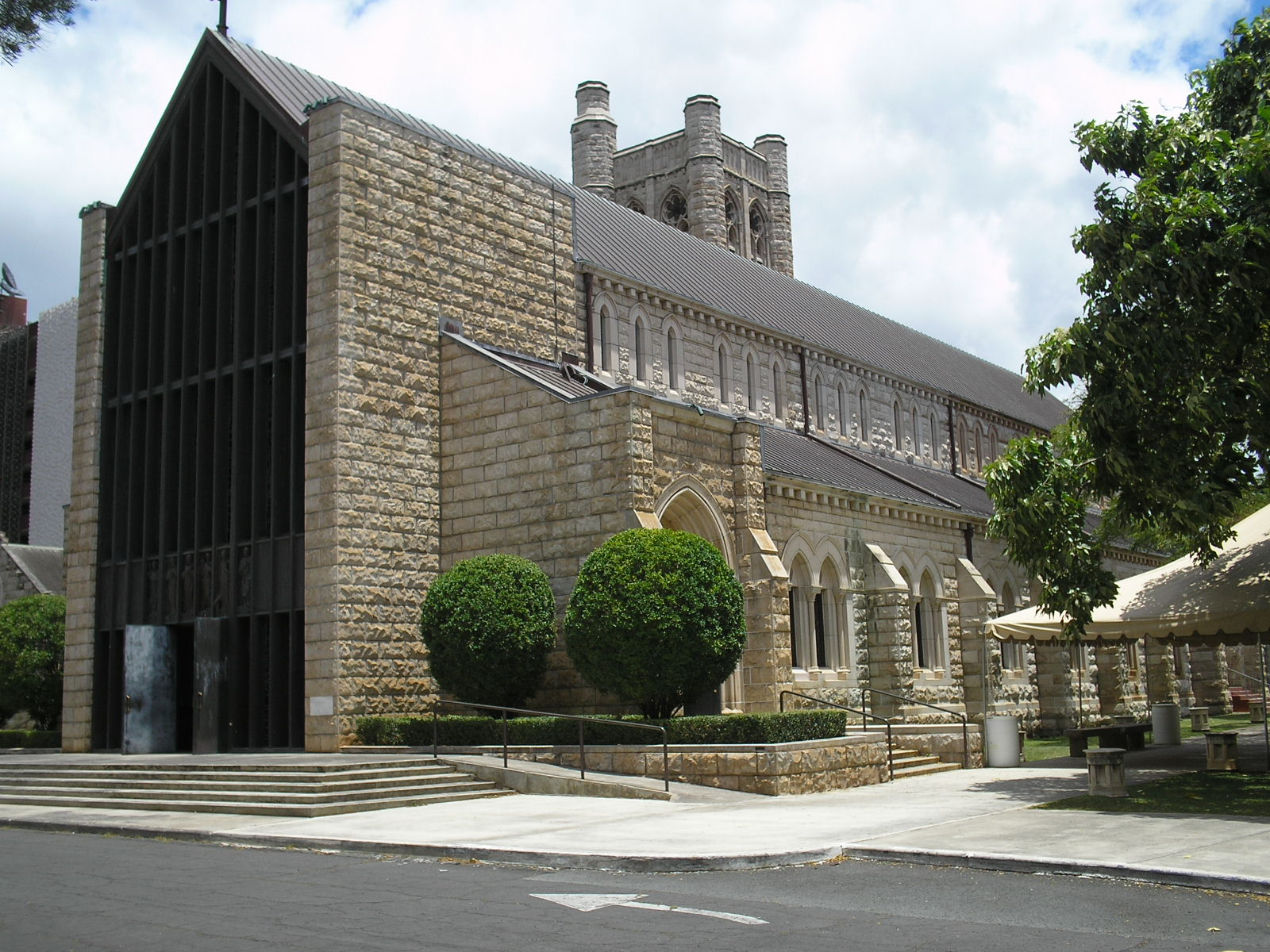
Exterior of nave, showing stonework from successive extensions

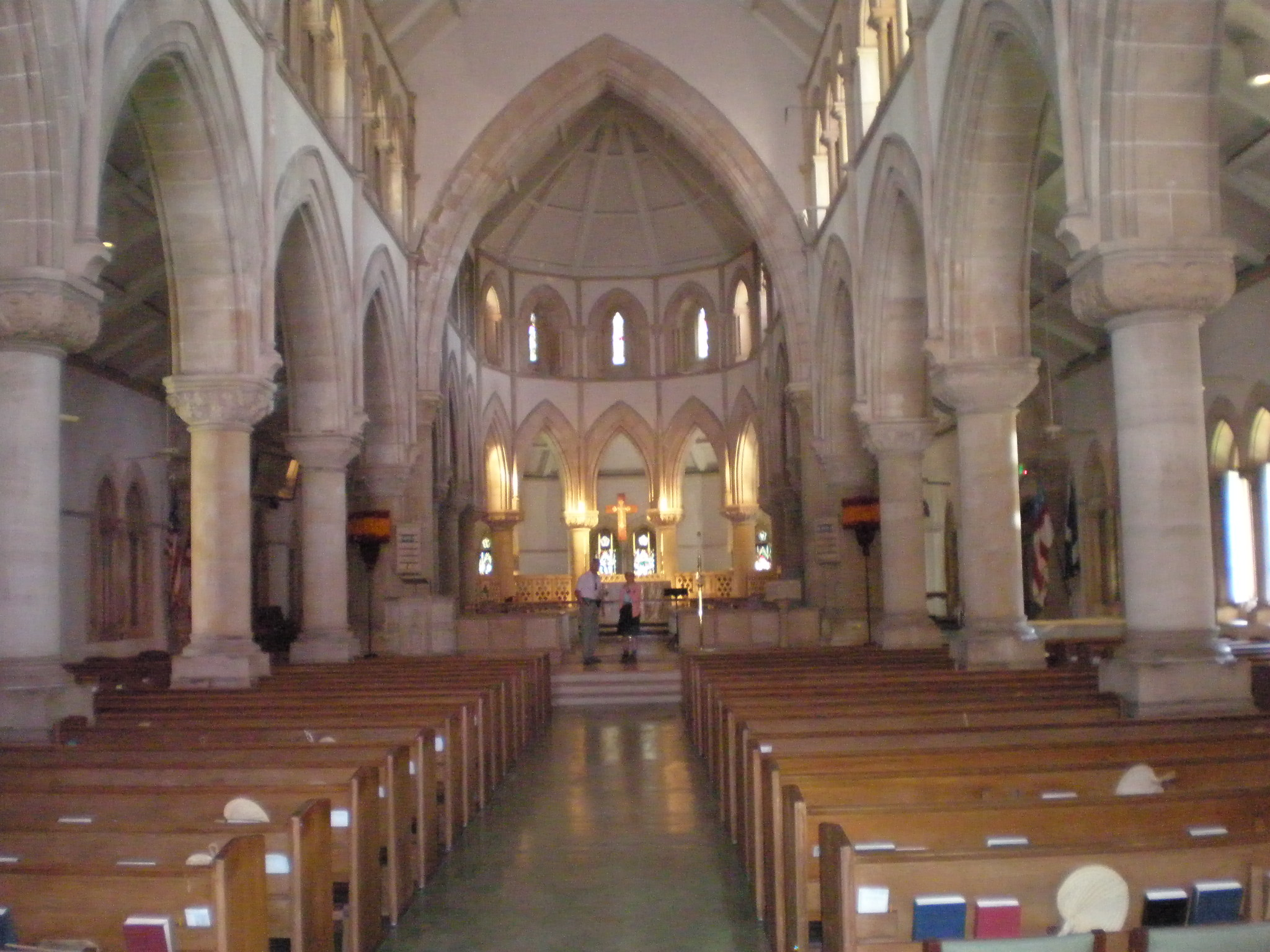
Interior of nave, with fans in pews

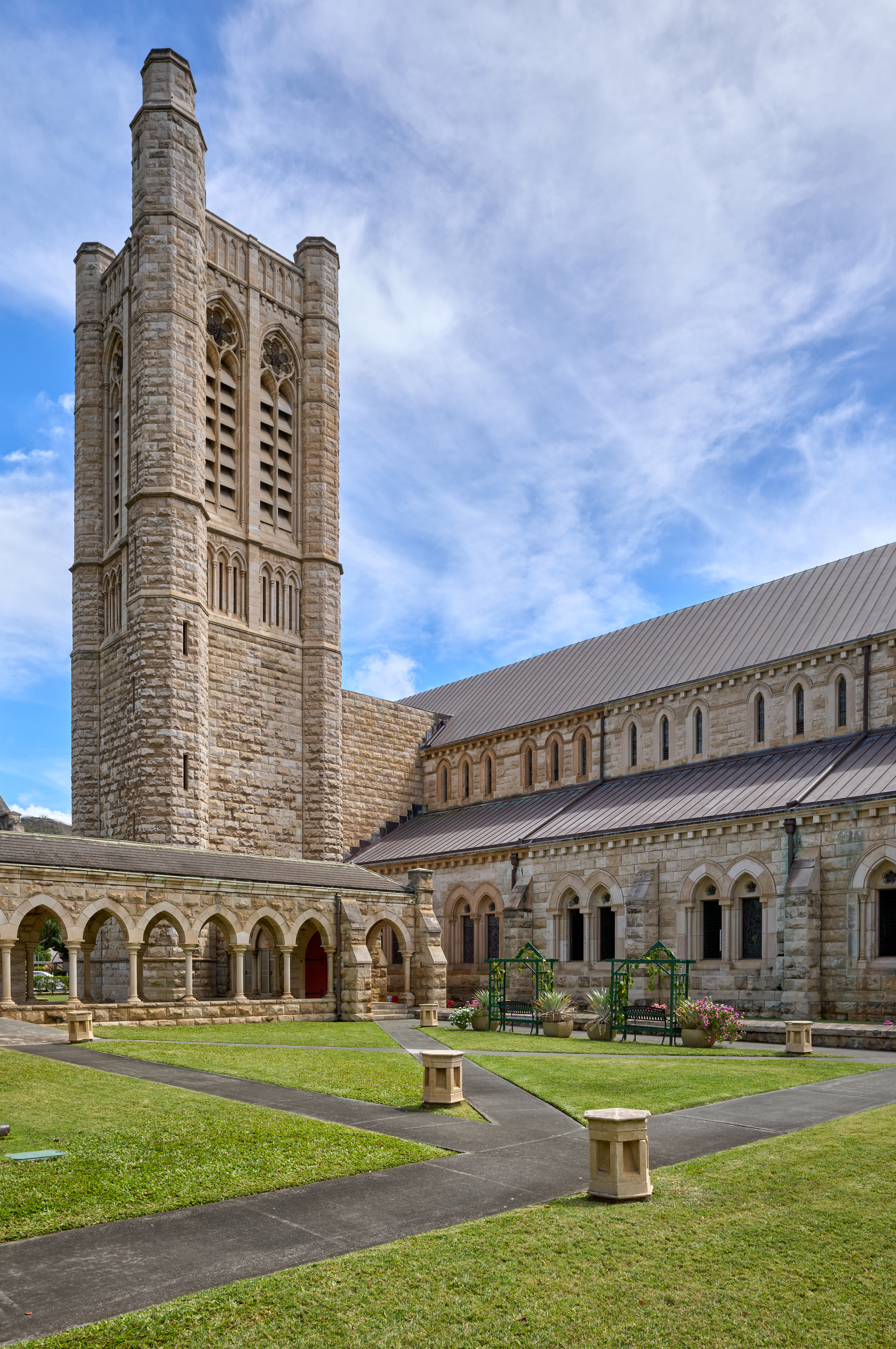
Bell tower

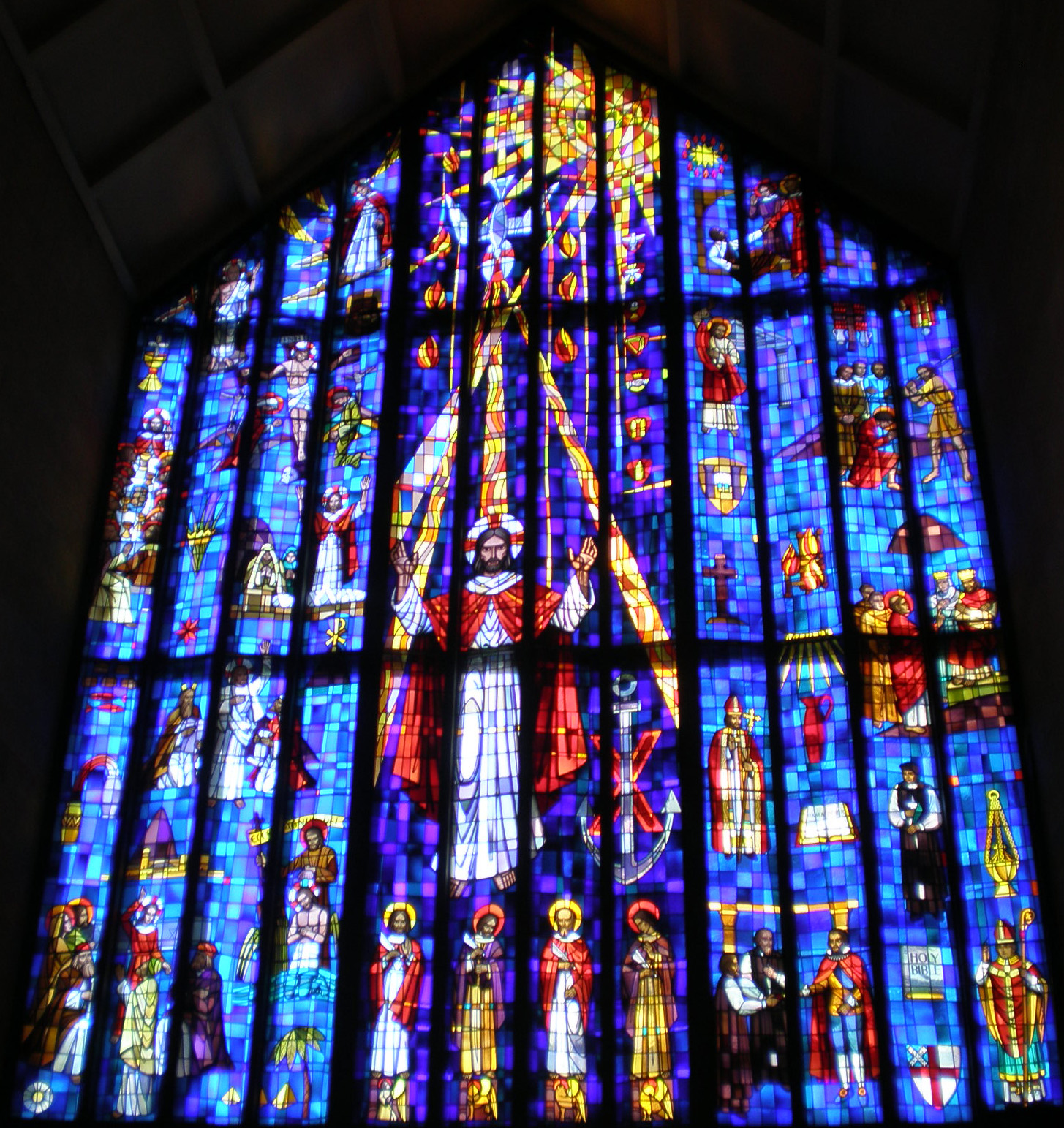
Stained glass over front door, with Jesus on a surfboard at top left

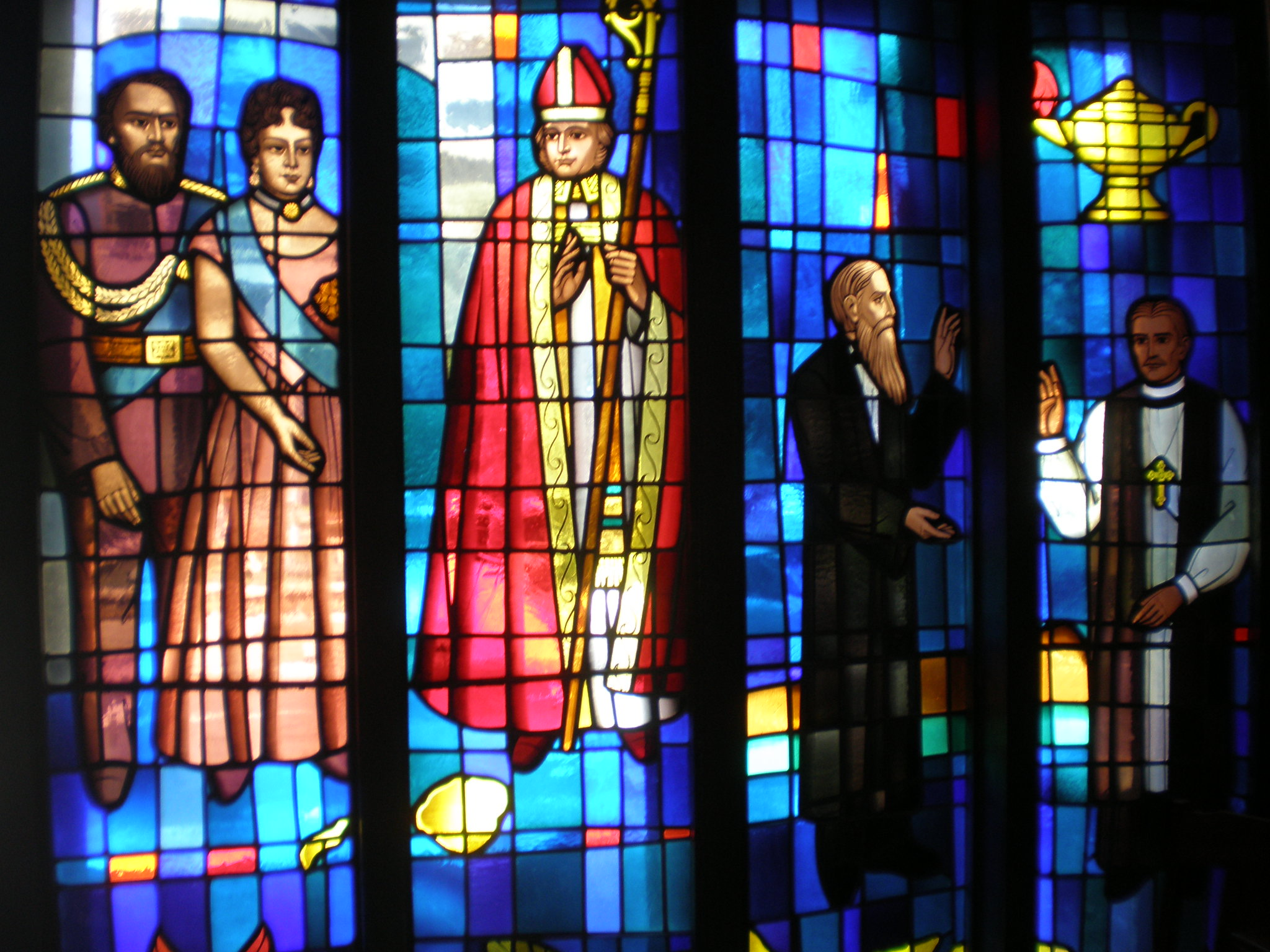
Stained glass with King Kamehameha IV, Queen Emma, Bishop Thomas N. Staley, and Sanford B. Dole

== See also ==
- List of the Episcopal cathedrals of the United States
- List of cathedrals in the United States
