= William Jones Boone =

William Jones Boone may refer to:

- William Jones Boone Sr. (1811–1864), first Anglican missionary bishop of Shanghai
- William Jones Boone Jr. (1845–1891), fourth Anglican missionary bishop of Shanghai

== See also ==
- William Boone (disambiguation)
