= Beizhengjie Christian Church =

- Trinity Church
- 北正街基督教堂
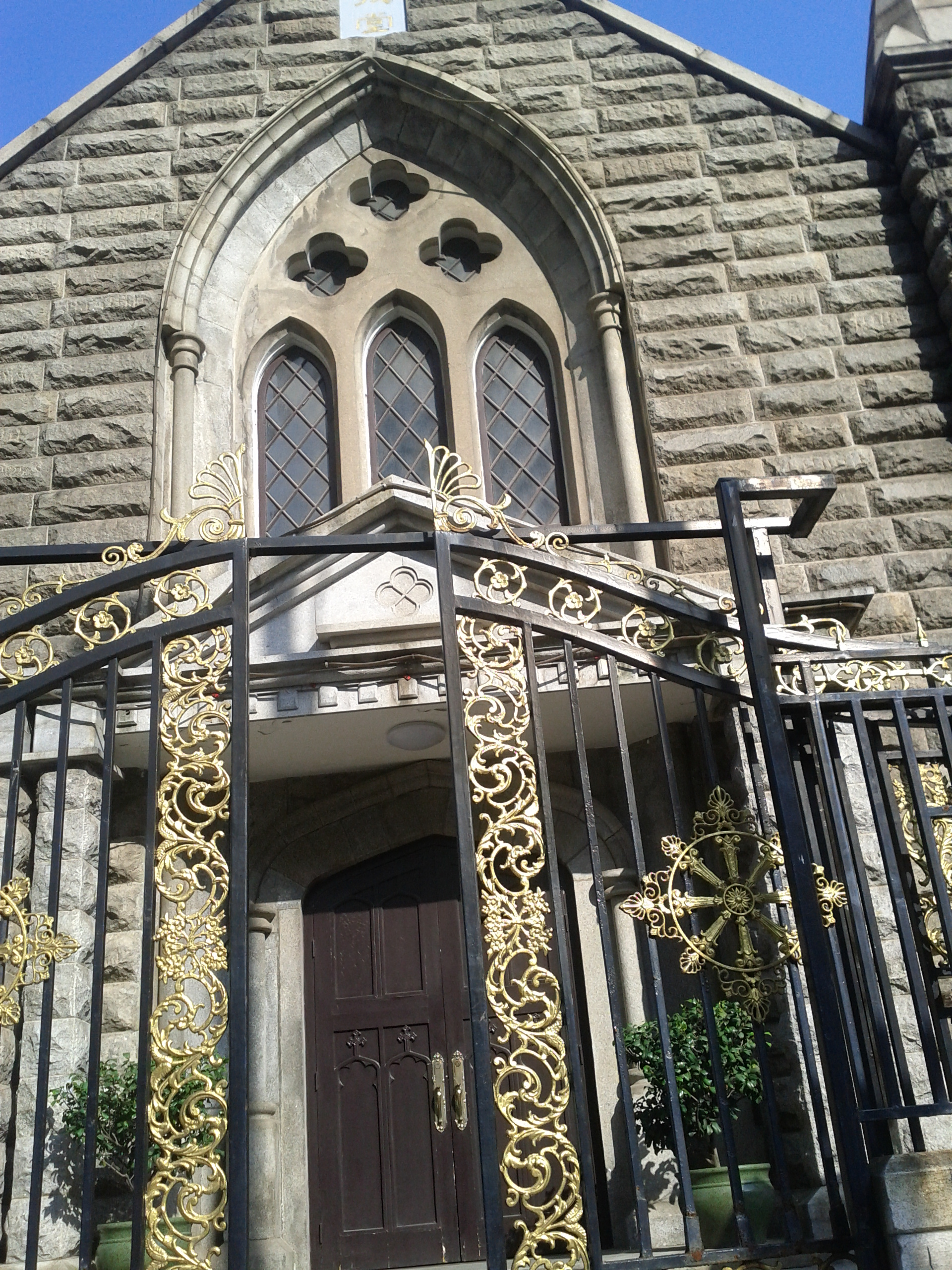
- Beizhengjie Christian Church

- Location in Hunan Beizhengjie Christian Church (China)
- 28°12′24″N 112°58′33″E
- Location: Huangxing North Road, Changsha, Hunan
- Country: China
- Denomination: Protestant
- Previous denomination: Episcopal
- Website: www.csbzjjt.com

History
- Status: Parish church
- Founded: 1905

Architecture
- Functional status: Active
- Architect: Dr. Alfred A. Gilman
- Architectural type: Church building
- Style: Gothic Revival
- Years built: 1905

Specifications
- Materials: Granite

Administration
- Archdiocese: Changsha
- Diocese: Changsha

Clergy
- Bishop: Wu Wei

The Beizhengjie Christian Church (Chinese: 北正街基督教堂; pinyin: Beǐzhèngjiē Jīdū Jiàotáng), formerly known as Trinity Church (Chinese: 三一堂; pinyin: Sānyī táng; Wade–Giles: San^{1}-i^{1} tʽang^{2}), is a neo-Gothic Protestant church located on Huangxing North Road of Changsha, Hunan province, China, formerly belonging to the Episcopal Church of the United States.

== History ==
It was built in 1905 by the Protestant Episcopal Church Mission and formerly called Trinity Church under the Church of China, it was designed by the bishop Dr. Alfred A. Gilman, and built of big blocks of rough granite. It was ruined in 1910. The rebuilding began in 1911 and ended completely in 1915.

During the Xinhai Revolution, General Huang Xing took refuge here, he wrote "To worship Holy Christ, we must be devout. To save the world, he lived among the low." (traditional Chinese: 耶穌聖名、敬拜宜誠、辭尊居卑、為救世人; simplified Chinese: 耶稣圣名、敬拜宜诚、辞尊居卑、为救世人)

After the founding of PRC in 1949, it was taken as the match storage of Changsha Department Store Company and then as the celebration center of Hunan Finance Company.

In 2002, it was listed as a "Historical and Cultural Sites Protected at the Provincial Level" by the Hunan government.

On December 20, 2004, it again opened to pilgrim.
