= Daniel Huntington =

Daniel Huntington may refer to:

- Daniel Huntington (artist) (1816–1906), American artist
- Daniel Huntington (bishop) (1868–?), American missionary to China
- Daniel Riggs Huntington (1871–1962), American architect
