= Samuel Isaac Joseph Schereschewsky =

Anglican bishop in China (1831–1906)

Joseph Schereschewsky
- Anglican Bishop of Shanghai
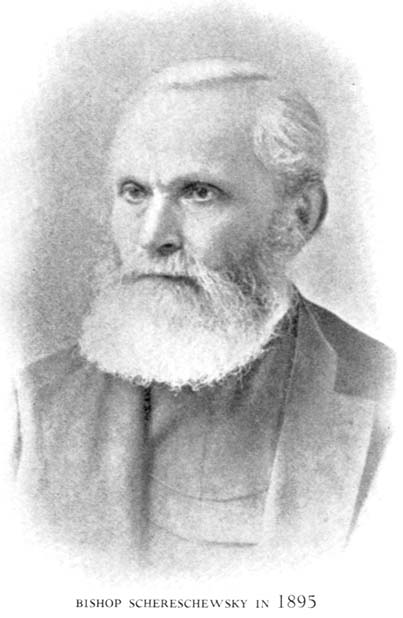
- Church: Episcopal Church
- See: Shanghai
- In office: 1877–1884
- Predecessor: Channing M. Williams
- Successor: William Jones Boone, Jr.

Orders
- Ordination: 28 October 1860
- Consecration: 31 October 1877 by Benjamin Bosworth Smith

Personal details
- Born: 6 May 1831 Tauroggen, Russian Lithuania
- Died: 15 October 1906 (aged 75) Tokyo, Japan

Samuel Isaac Joseph Schereschewsky
- Chinese: 施約瑟
Transcriptions
Standard Mandarin
- Hanyu Pinyin: Shī Yuēsè
- Gwoyeu Romatzyh: Shy Iueseh
- Wade–Giles: Shih Yüeh-se
- Yale Romanization: Shr̄ Ywēsè
- IPA: [ʂɻ̩́ ɥésɤ̂]
Yue: Cantonese
- Yale Romanization: Yih Yeuk Sàt
- Jyutping: Ji6 Joek3 Sat1
- IPA: [jìːjœ̄ːk sɐ̂t]

Samuel Isaac Joseph Schereschewsky (Note: The actual Polish surname is Szereszewski.) (pronounced skĕr-ĕs-kūs'kĭ Chinese: 施約瑟; 6 May 1831 – 15 October 1906), also known as Joseph Schereschewsky, was the Anglican Bishop of Shanghai, China, from 1877 to 1884. He founded St. John's University, Shanghai, in 1879.

== Early years ==
Schereschewsky was born in Tauroggen, Russian Lithuania, on 6 May 1831. He appears to have been named for his father. His mother was Rosa Salvatha. Orphaned as a young boy, it is speculated he was raised by a half-brother who was a timber merchant in good circumstance. Having shown himself to be a promising student, he was given the best education available and it was his family's intention that he become a rabbi. From the time he left his brother's house at 15, he was obliged to support himself as a tutor and as a glazier. It was at the rabbinical school in Zhytomyr that he was given a copy of the New Testament in Hebrew which had been produced by the London Society for Promoting Christianity amongst the Jews. The study of that gradually convinced him that in Jesus the Messianic prophecies of the Old Testament and the age-long hopes of his people had been fulfilled. At the age of 19 years, he went to Germany where he studied for a year or more at Frankfurt and for two years at the University of Breslau. To his fluency in Yiddish, Polish and Russian he added German, which he spoke like a native for the rest of his life.

== Road to China ==
In 1854, he decided to emigrate to the United States, particularly New York City, where he connected with Messianic Jews but did not enter the church until 1855 when he was baptized by immersion and associated with a Baptist congregation. For reasons unknown, he then became a Presbyterian and went to the Western Theological Seminary of the Presbyterian Church at Allegheny, Pennsylvania. (Western Theological Seminary is now Pittsburgh Theological Seminary. He matriculated as Samuel Isaac Joseph, ostensibly to avoid anti-Semitism.) After more than two years, he left to enter the Episcopal Church and the General Theological Seminary, where he found a mentor in the professor of Hebrew, Samuel H. Turner. His plan to complete his remaining two years of study was interrupted when he offered himself for work in China. On 3 May 1859, the Foreign Committee voted that he be appointed missionary to China as soon as he was ordained. He was ordained as a deacon on 17 July 1859 at St. George's Church, New York by Bishop William Jones Boone.

== Career in China ==
Schereschewsky arrived in Shanghai on 21 December 1859 on the ship Golden Rule with Bishop Boone. On 28 October 1860 Bishop Boone ordained him to the priesthood in the mission school chapel, later known as the Church of our Savior, Hongkew. He served in Peking from 1862, including on the Peking Translation Committee.

By 1861, Schereschewsky had begun his Bible translations into Chinese. The first was of the Psalms into the Shanghai dialect. He later translated the Book of Common Prayer into Mandarin with English missionary John Shaw Burdon.

He returned to the United States for health reasons in 1875, and refused a call to become missionary bishop of Shanghai, since bishop Channing Moore Williams had requested division of his huge episcopate (including both China and Japan). However, two years later, Schereschewsky accepted the call to that bishopric from the Episcopal House of Bishops, after receiving assurances of financial support for his dream of building a college to educate Chinese in Shanghai. Schereschewsky was consecrated Bishop in Grace Church, New York, on October 31, 1877 and two years later founded St. John's College (later renamed St. John's University). He served as Bishop of Shanghai until 1883, when he resigned his bishopric for health reasons (having become increasingly incapacitated after suffering a sun stroke in 1881).

He returned to the United States with the understanding that he could return to China as translator as his health permitted. That he did in 1895, although he became "paralysed in every limb, and with his powers of speech partly gone, sitting for nearly twenty-five years in the same chair, slowly and painfully typing out with two fingers his Mandarin translation of the Old Testament and Easy Wen-li translation of the whole Bible" His new translations of the New Testament and the Hebrew Bible into Mandarin were published in 1898–1899. However, Schereschewsky yearned to complete a new translation of the Bible into Wenli, China's classical language, finding the previous five attempts inaccurate and some even lapsing into paganism (1902).

He continued his translation work, with the assistance of an amanuensis in Chinese and later Japanese, when he moved to Tokyo, Japan during his final decade. A contemporary called him, "[p]robably the greatest Bible translator China ever had".

== Death and legacy ==
Schereschewsky died on 15 October 1906 and is buried in Tokyo, Japan. St. John's University, which Schereschewsky began with 39 students, mostly taught in Chinese. In 1891, it changed to teaching in English and the courses began to focus on science and natural philosophy.

== Veneration ==
Schereschewsky is honored with a feast day on the liturgical calendar of the Episcopal Church (USA) on 14 October.

== Sources ==
- Muller, James Arthur Apostle of China: Samuel Isaac Joseph Schereschewsky (New York: Moorhouse, 1937) Open Library (requires key)
- Eber, Irene (1999). The Jewish Bishop and the Chinese Bible: S.I.J. Schereschewsky, (1831-1906). Leiden; Boston: Brill. ISBN 9004112669.
- Green, David B. (15 October 2015). "This day in History 1906: The Anglican bishop of Shanghai dies". haaretz.com. Archived from the original on April 6, 2016.

Episcopal Church (USA) titles
Preceded by Channing Moore Williams	Bishop of Shanghai; 1877 – 1884	Succeeded by William Jones Boone, Jr.
