= Eighteen Stairs =

Historic district in Chongqing

The Eighteen Stairs is one of the five traditional style districts in Chongqing, located in the south of Yuzhong District.

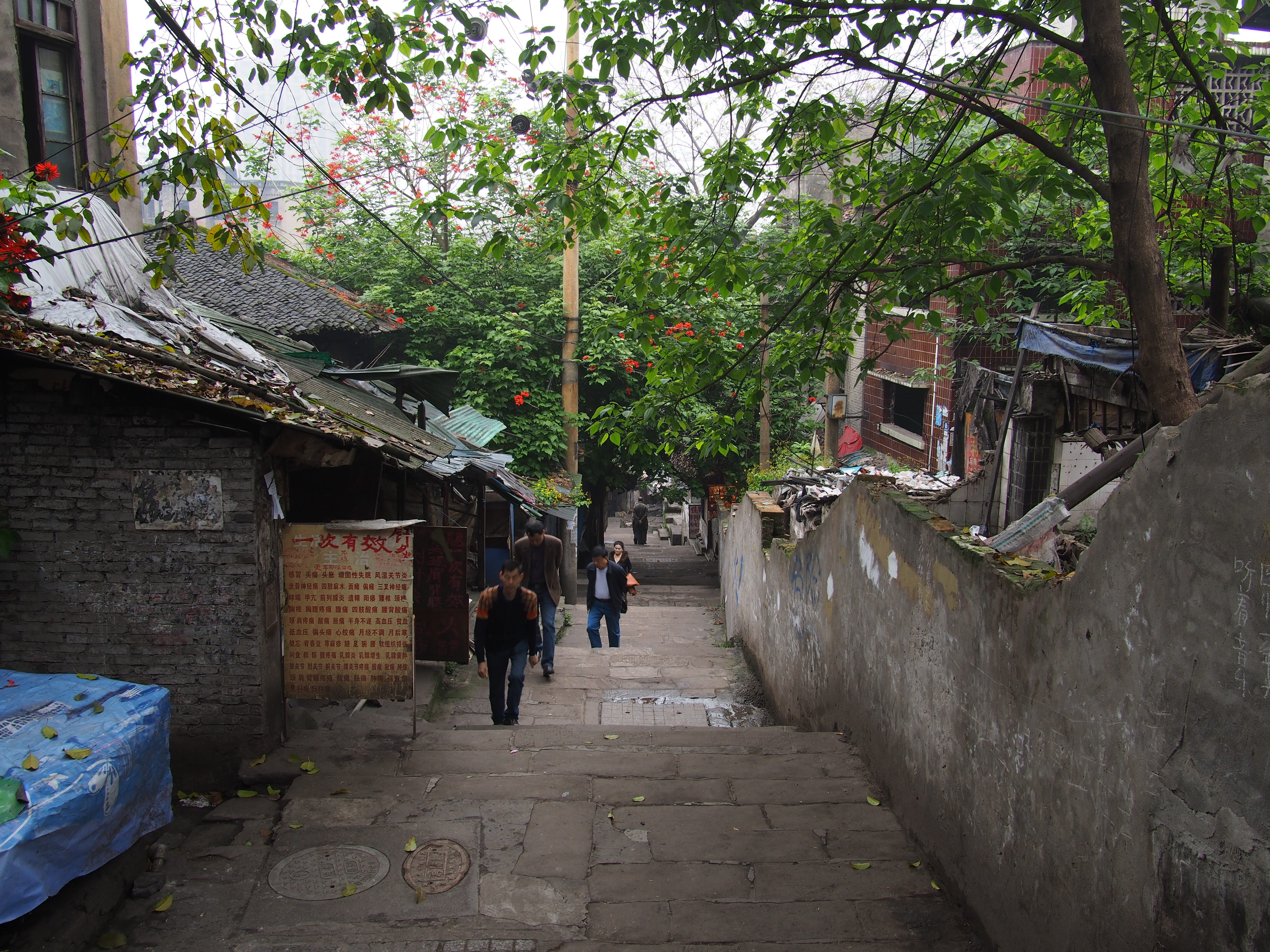
Old Street in Eighteen Stairs Area

The name also refers to the Eighteen Stairs Road itself, which is situated in the district. It is a section of green stone stairs that has over 200 steps and is about 400 meters long. It connects Chongqing's upper half with the city's lower half from north to south.

== Geography ==
The Eighteen Stairs Traditional Style District borders Zhongxing Road and the Jiaochangkou station in the north, and West Jiefang Road in the south.

The area consists of 188,800 square meters, with 38,900 m^{2} designated as a "core protection" area, 71,700 m^{2} as a "controlled construction" area and 78,200 m^{2} as a "style coordination" area. Construction has been planned for around 161,000 m^{2}, separated into five plots which are labelled from A to E. There are four functional zones: Traditional Culture Experience Zone (A, B), National Tide Cultural and Creative Experience Zone (C), International Exchange Center (D), Lifestyle Center (E). Additionally, two landscape zones have been planned: the North-South Landscape Zone and East-West Tourism Expansion Zone. Zones A, B, and C opened to the public on September 30, 2021.

== History ==
During the Qin dynasty, the dynasty built Jiangzhou City on the Yuzhong Peninsula after conquering the states of Ba and Shu in 316 BC. The Eighteen Stairs area became one of the earliest residential settlements in Chongqing because it was located on the river terrace of the Yuzhong Peninsula and had convenient access to water.

In 1189, Song Emperor Guangzong Zhao Dun of the Southern Song dynasty set up the General Town Official Office and the Guardian Army Camp in the middle of the mountain in Chongqing to guard the three banks of the Yangtze River. To facilitate military drills, the official road of stone stairs was built to connect with the school dam, forming the earliest Eighteen Stairs.

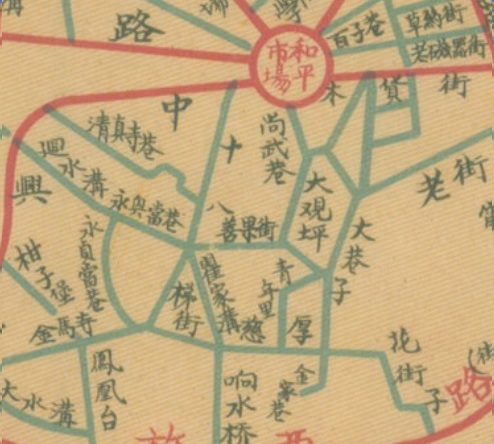
Old Eighteen Stairs map

After Li Yan of Three Kingdoms in 226 AD and Peng Daya of the Southern Song dynasty built a large-scale city in Chongqing in 1240, the mother city of Chongqing expanded to the west and north to the area of the Jiaochangba (today's Jiaochangkou) and Linjiangmen, which increased the population around the Eighteen Stairs area.

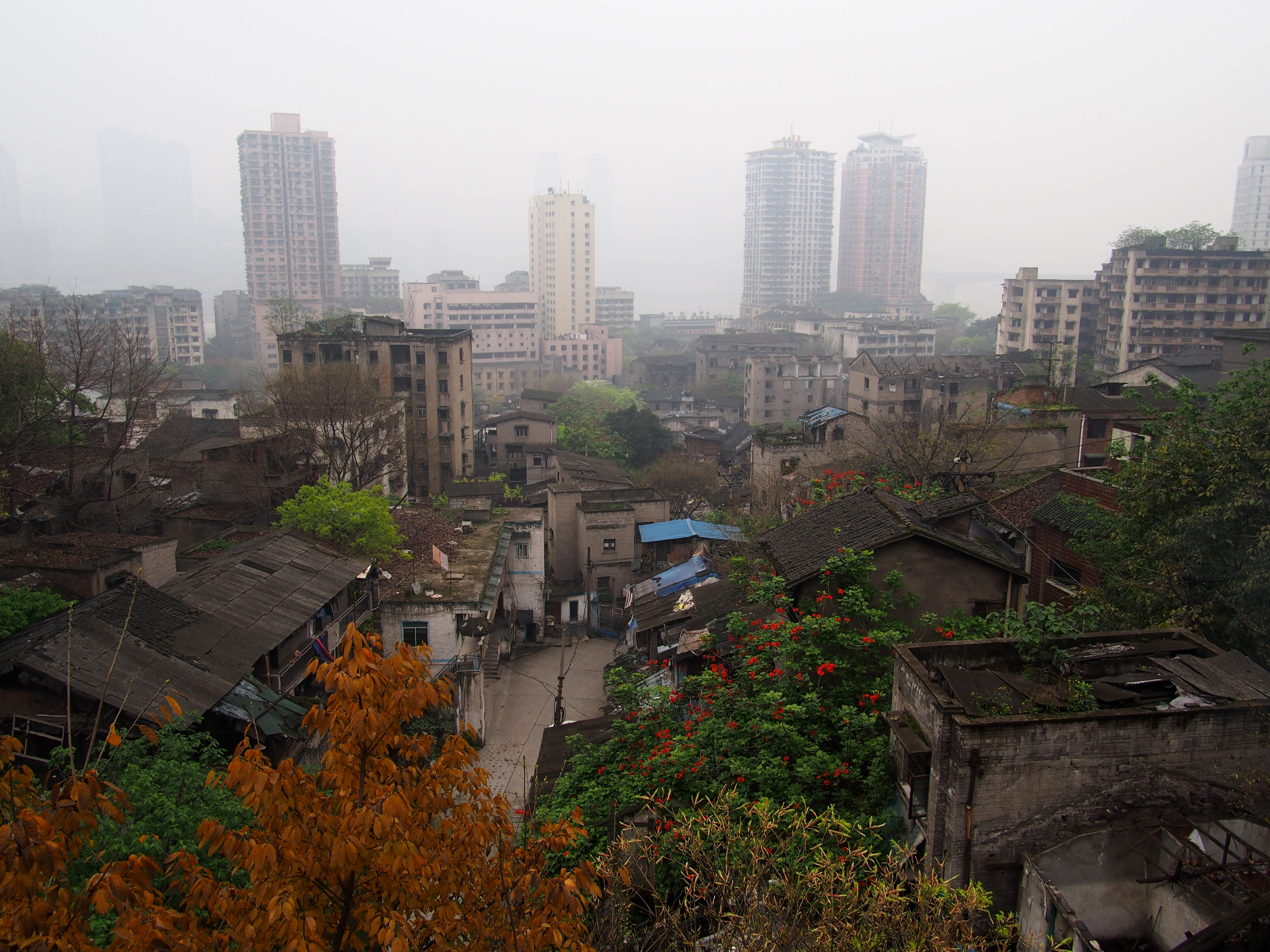
View of the Eighteen Stairs from Guanyin Rock in April 2015

In 1371, Dai Ding of Ming dynasty built nine open and eight closed Chongqing city gates, and the Eighteen Stairs were in the area of Nanjimen, Jinzimen and Chuqimen. At this time, the city of Chongqing covered the majority of the Yuzhong Peninsula. As the city stretched over the Huaying Mountain, its elevation at different points had significant differences, splitting the city into an upper and lower half, with the Eighteen Stairs at the centre.

During the Ming and Qing dynasties, Chongqing served as a gateway to Sichuan, with convenient land and water transportation, and merchants entering Sichuan for trade stopped here for transit. The main commercial and political centers of Chongqing were located along the Yangtze River in the lower half of the city, which made the area from the lower half of the city to Chaotianmen very prosperous. The area from the Eighteen Stairs to the upper half of the city was originally a relatively isolated area for reserved for education, culture, and aesthetic gardens along with the General Town Office, the Right Battalion Office, and the Guard Office. However, military teaching grounds, which included the Eighteen Stairs was soon established in the vicinity, which led to the establishment of public places such as the herbal medicine market, the mosque, and the Ma Wang Temple. As transportation improved in convenience and the marketplace became more popular, the upper half of the city gradually became a distribution center for trade. The Eighteen Stairs became the main link between the upper and lower half of the city.

In 1891, when Chongqing was established as a port, the population increased dramatically. At this time, Chongqing began to expand and change its infrastructure, with the city's first mayor, Pan Wenhua, building roads. During the Anti-Japanese War of the Republic of China, the Consulate General of France, originally located at No. 12 Consulate Lane, was destroyed by Japanese planes, and the consulate was moved to No. 35 Fenghuang Tai, 18 Steps. Liu Hongsheng founded the China Match Material Factory at No. 158 West Jiefang Road near the Eighteen Stairs. In 1932, Liu Xiang set up the earliest wireless radio station in western China in the name of Sichuan's post-emergency governor at Shango Lane in the Eighteen Stairs. On May 5, 1930, Liu Wanan, secretary of the Sichuan Provincial Committee of the Chinese Communist Party underground, was arrested at a meeting in a secret stronghold at No. 39 Houci Street. During the war period, Chongqing built roads such as Zhongxing Road and Kaixuan Road, which also connected the upper and lower halves. These new roads gradually overtook the Eighteen Stairs in usage. In the 1990s, a labor market was established near Nan Ji Men, and a large number of migrant workers moved into the Eighteen Stairs nearby, where many facilities are now old and not maintained. After the reform and opening up, the core business district of Chongqing moved to the vicinity of Jiefangbei, further reducing the usage of the Eighteen Stairs.

On April 14, 2009, a fire broke out in the Qujiagou area of the Eighteen Stairs, burning down at least 20–30 residential houses. In 2010, the decision to renovate and conserve the area as a historical monument was made by the Yuzhong District, with renovation work starting in 2017 and partially reopening to the public on September 30, 2021. In January 2021, the Eighteen Steps was included in the "First List of Historic Place Names Protection in Chongqing".

== Protection and renovation ==
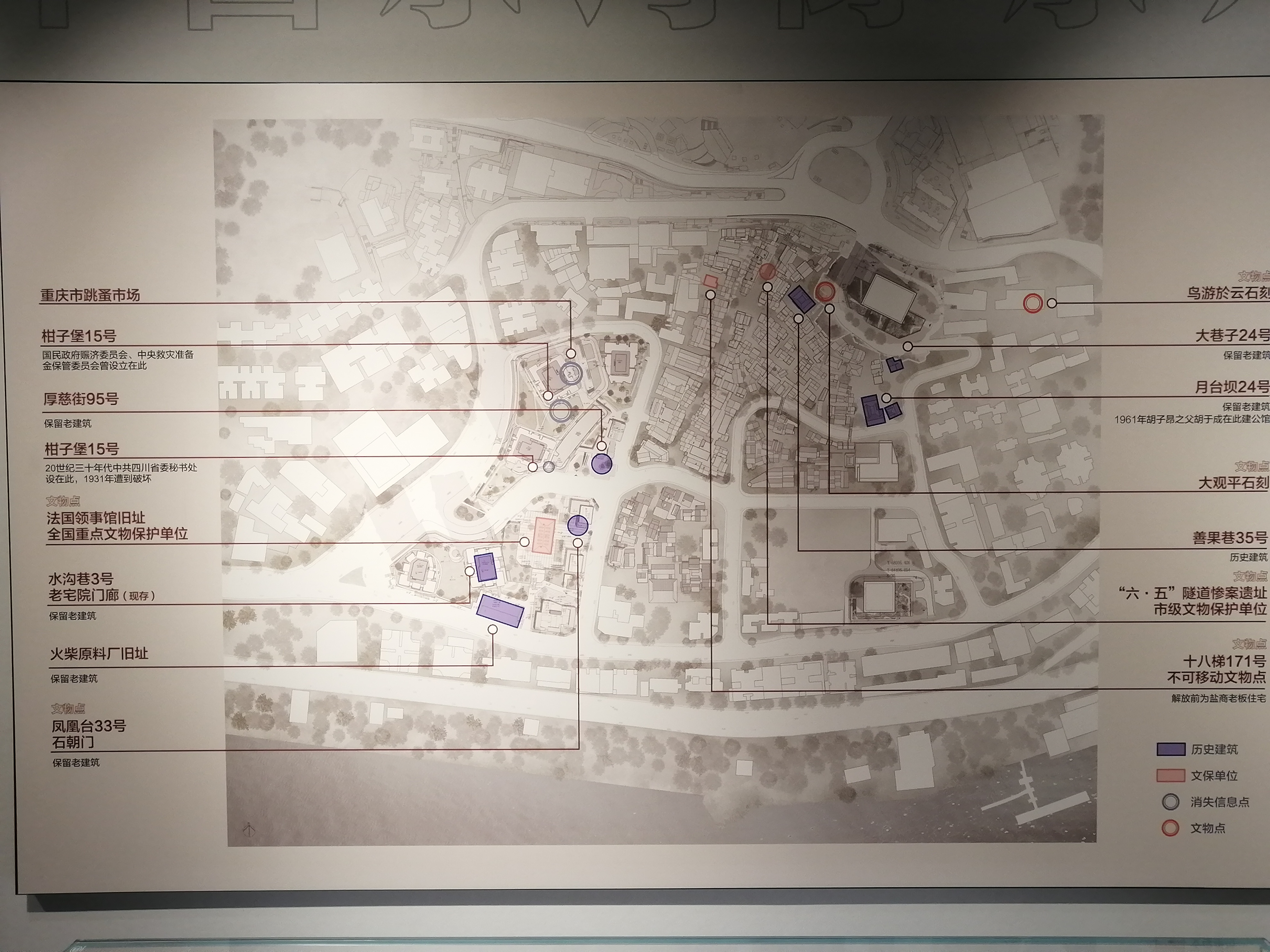
The Eighteenth Stairs renovation map and the protected cultural heritage units

=== Planning ===
Yuzhong District entrusted the Eighteen Stairs Traditional Style District to East China Architecture Design Institute to prepare the implementation plan. The plan includes preserving and restoring the original street pattern and street names, highlighting the residential style of the mountain city, and showing the traditional Bayu culture and the culture of the Anti-War Companions.

According to the articles "Urban Design Plan for Improving the Comprehensive Environmental Quality of Fangbei Business District", "Urban Design Plan for Tourism Routes and Supporting Facilities in the downtown of Yuzhong District", and "Urban Design Plan for Improving the Quality of Chaotianmen area in Yuzhong District", published on the Chongqing Planning Bureau website in 2017, the plan for the Eighteen Stairs included 286 structures. It included one "national key cultural relic protection unit of China" (former site of the French Consulate), one "municipal cultural relic protection unit of Chongqing" (site of the "6th Five Year Plan" Tunnel Massacre), two "cultural relics sites", 11 "excellent historical buildings", and 52 "traditional style buildings".

=== Construction ===
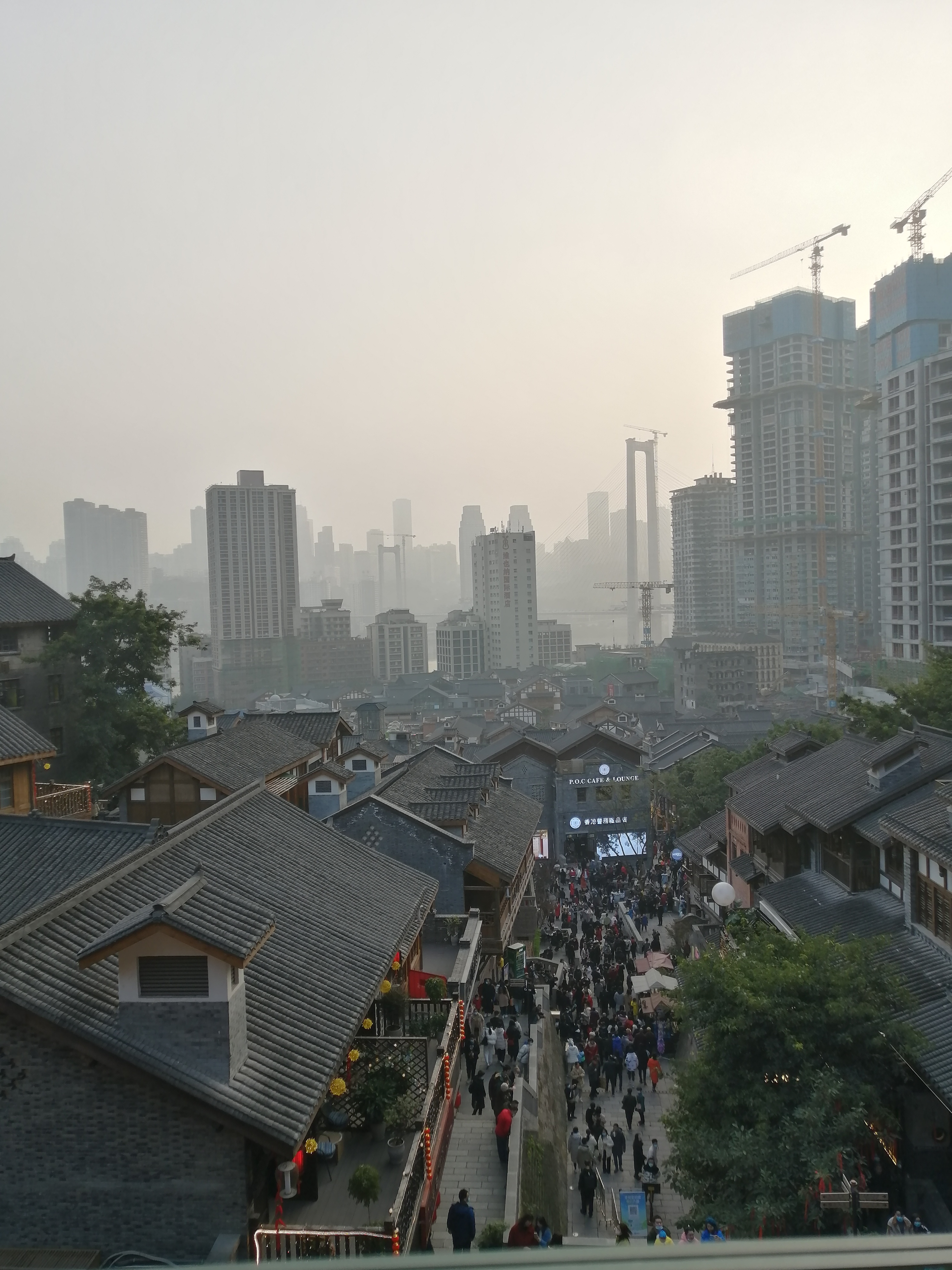
View of the Eighteen Steps from Guanyinyan in January 2022

In 2008, the preliminary work for renovating the dilapidated housing area of the Eighteenth Stairs began. In 2010, with the demolition and renovation of the old city of Yuzhong District, 18 Steps launched a public opinion survey on the renovation of dilapidated houses from June 7. On June 19 and 20, more than 7,000 households involved in the renovation voted on whether they were willing to renovate dilapidated houses, which was the first time in Chongqing to conduct a mass vote on the issue of demolition and relocation, and finally, 96.1% of the households agreed to relocate.

In October, Yuzhong District started bidding for the construction of 6,638 houses for demolition and resettlement in the 18-story dilapidated housing renovation area. On May 17, 2015, the fourth meeting of Chongqing Municipal Planning Commission and the first meeting of the city's Historic and Cultural City Protection Committee were held to designate the Eighteen Stairs Traditional Style Area as one of the 28 traditional style areas in Chongqing.

In 2016, the implementation plan for protecting the Eighteen Stairs and the traffic organization aspects passed the expert review, and the overall control plan revision was completed. In October, the Eighteen Stairs Core Protection Zone was auctioned, and Hangzhou Xintiandi was awarded the Eighteen Stairs commercial site. The Eighteen Stairs Landscape Coordination Zone was auctioned in November, and Malaysia's Fenglong Group was awarded this site.

In May 2017, the Eighteen Stairs Traditional Style Area project was officially opened. During the renovation process, the old steps of the Eighteen Steps and the old trees beside them were preserved, and the destroyed Yu Youren's former residence and the Yan Bang Building were also restored. On September 30, 2021, the Eighteen Stairs Traditional Style Area will officially open to the public.

== Seven Streets, Six Alleys, Eighteen Scenes ==
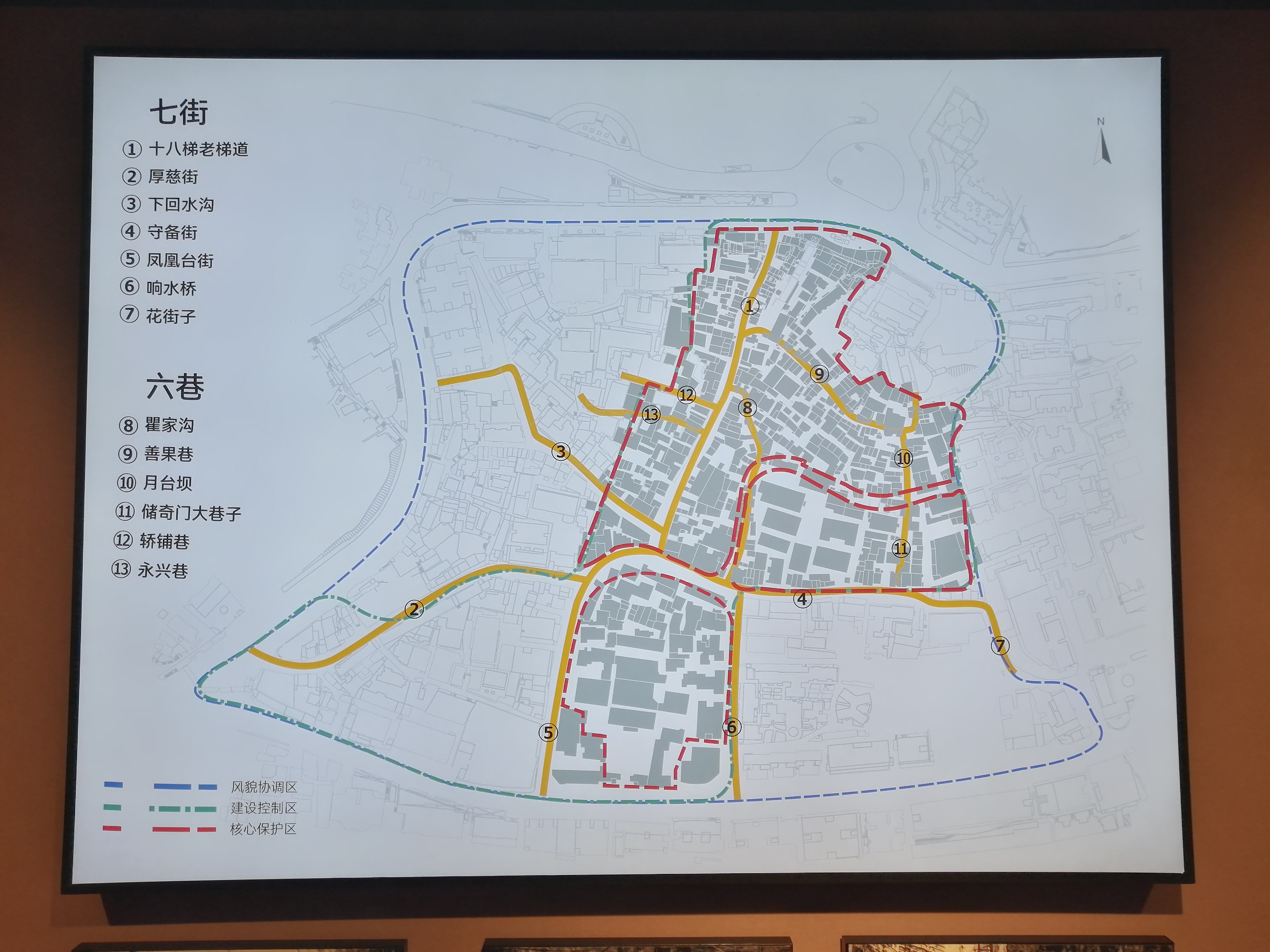
Original Eighteen Stairs Layout

The transformation of the Eighteen Stairs Traditional Style Area preserves the original seven streets and six alleys with eighteen scenes, of which the seven streets and six alleys follow the layout of the original Eighteen Stairs.

=== Seven Streets ===
- Eighteen Stairs (十八梯): In the late Southern Song dynasty, an official road was set up in the eighteen stairs, and there was an ancient well next to it, and its water was lovely, so it became a source of drinking water for the According to legend, the location of the well is just eighteen stone steps from the well to the eighteen stairs, hence the name. The ancient well was located near No. 160 of the original eighteen stairs, then dried up and abandoned, later the well was filled in due to the construction of a highway. Another theory is that during the Ming and Qing dynasties, more than 200 steps here were divided into 18 sections, hence the name.
- Houci Street (厚慈街): Houci Street was originally named "Tasty Street", and later there was a large water tank for fire prevention. After the merger with other alleys, such as Jinmaji Street, Shuangmizi and Taigan Street, the name was changed to "Houci Street".
- Xia Hui Gutter (下回水沟): In the early years of the Republic of China, there was a long alley here, from the wrinkle there is a drainage ditch, and because of the construction of Zhongxing Road and the gutter back into two sections, this section is the lower section, so the name.
- Shoubei Street (守备街)
- Fenghuang tai Street (凤凰台街)
- Xiangshui Bridge (响水桥): In the old days, one of the eight bridges in Chongqing Prefecture, the bridge was named after the sound of flowing water under it.
- Husjie zi (花街子)

=== Six Alleys ===
- Qujia Ditch (瞿家沟): One of the sections of the gutter of the drainage system of the ancient city of Chongqing, named after the family name.
- Shanguo Lane (善果巷): Originally named Tai Shan Fang, "Ba Xian Zhi" records, the old place residents believe in Buddhism, spontaneously raised money to donate oil to light the lamp, every night to light the night light for the convenience of pedestrians, and then renamed Shanguo Lane.
- Moon Terrace Dam (月台坝): In 1916, Hu Yu, father of Hu Ziang, built a public house here, with a semicircular ground dam in front of the door, resembling a curved moon, hence the name.
- Chuqimen Grand Alley (储奇门大巷子)
- Jiaopu Lane (轿铺巷): For topographical reasons and travel needs, the old Chongqing produced litter, sliding poles and other occupations, including the opening of stores specializing in sedan chairs at the entrance to this lane, hence the name.
- Yongxing Lane (永兴巷)

=== Eighteen Scenes ===
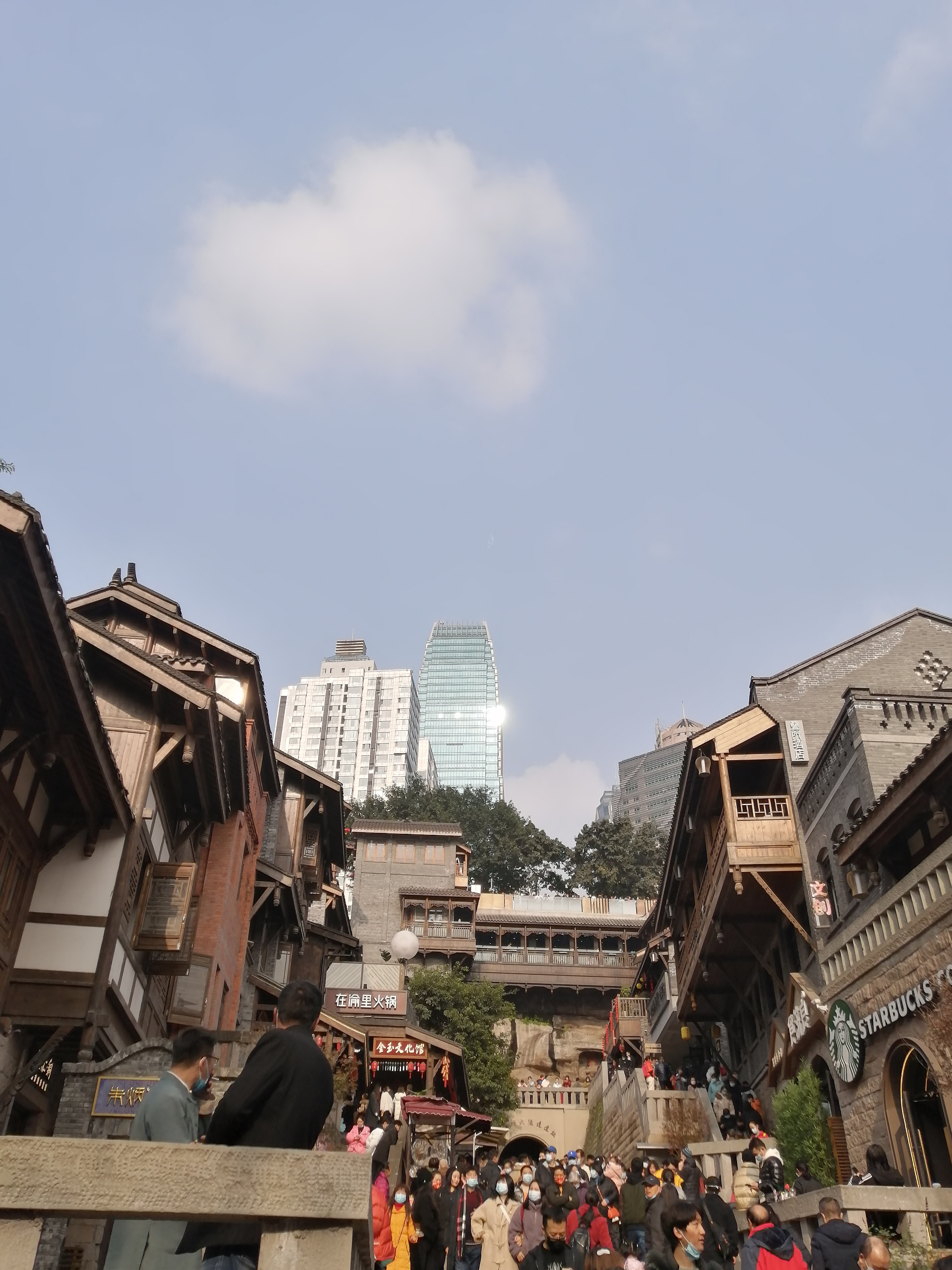
Eighteenth Stairs Ancient Well Square looking towards Guanyinyan

- Natural scenery: Flower Street Birdsong (Flower Street Sub), Huangge Guayue (Moon Terrace Dam).
- Artistic landscapes: Bichang Rang Sheng (Bichangkou observation deck, located above Guanyin Rock), Gujing Spring Breeze (Gujing Square), Buddha Cliff Sunset (the statue of Bodhisattva on the cliff wall on the left side of Shango Lane), Jiaopu Feng Yun (Jiaopu Lane), Jin Zi Ling Shi (the former site of Jin Zi Gate), Shango Night Light (Shango Lane), Lucky Blackboard (originally an L-shaped blackboard of about 2 square meters used for information announcement in the 18th Terrace neighborhood, now a large screen in Gujing Square).
- Historical exhibitions: Yu Gong Huihao (No. 5 Ringshui Bridge, the former residence of Mr. Yu Youren), the site of the Great Bombardment (the site of the Great Tunnel of the Eighteenth Stairs), and the Mountain City Memory Museum.
- Featured operations: Da Xiang Tingeng, Xingshui tea, hot pot traceability, Zen Hall praying for blessings (the old Eighteen Stairs under the side of Guanyin Hall), Fengtai Qin Yin (Fenghuang Tai Street), Bayu Family (Shan Guo Lane 35 of the opening period style buildings, for the old Chongqing a family of five generations of the same courtyard residential compound).

== Site of the Eighteenth Stairs Great Tunnel ==
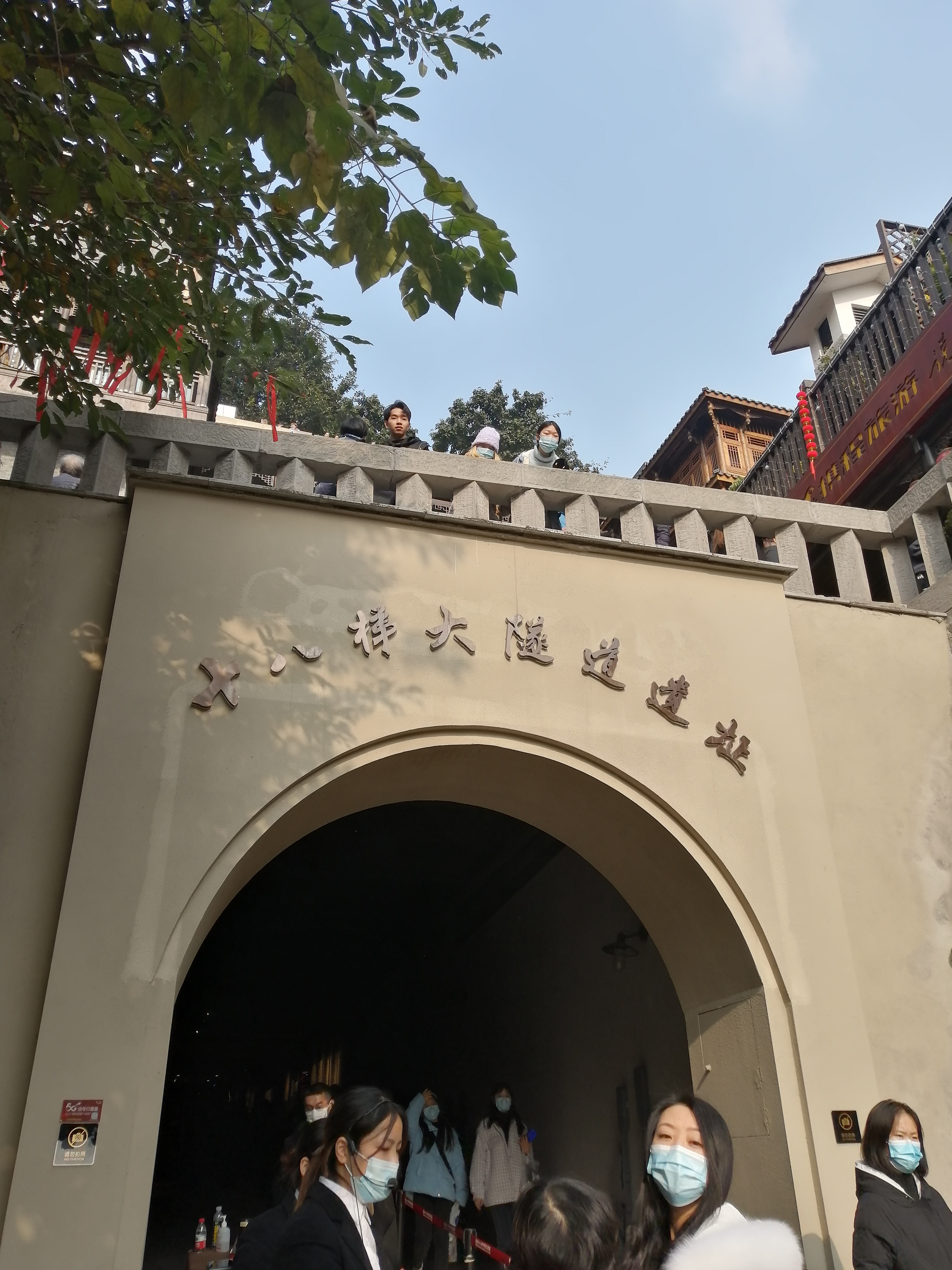
Site of the Eighteenth Stairs Great Tunnel

Eighteen Stairs Great Tunnel is located at the northern side of the rock wall in the Eighteen Stairs district. During the Second Sino-Japanese War, Chongqing began construction of public and private air-raid shelters. As part of the Chongqing Great Tunnel, the Eighteen Stairs air-raid shelter was one of the larger one in Chongqing at that time. The tunnel was 2 km long, 2 meters high and 10 meters deep. It had three exits but there is no water intake, ventilation, fire prevention or poison prevention facilities. On June 5, 1941, Japanese planes bombed Chongqing city for more than five hours during the Chongqing bombing raid. The tragic case of asphyxiation and trampling casualties among evacuees occurred at the Eighteenth Stairs, the Yanwu Hall, and the Shihui Shi air-raid shelter tunnel, killing about 2,500 people.

The site of the Eighteen Stairs Great Tunnel has since been restored and reopened to the public. The history of the construction of air-raid shelters in Chongqing is documented in detail, and a section of the original unmodified air-raid shelter has been preserved for visitors.

== Eighteen Stairs Mountain City Memory Museum ==
The Eighteen Stairs Mountain City Memory Museum, located on the west side of the main staircase of the Eighteen Stairs, was opened on September 29, 2021. It is converted and expanded from the original old building of the Eighteen Stairs, with four floors, displaying a large number of precious books, images, and video materials of old Chongqing, and using multimedia digital technologies such as wireless centralized control, immersive 3D projection, large screen splicing, and dreamy starry sky to process and present a variety of information such as text, graphics, images, sound, animation, and video, representing the memory of the old mountain city.

== Public transportation ==
There are six entrances and exits in the traditional style area of Eighteen Stairs: Jiefang South Road, Xiangshui Bridge, Shoubei Street, Huajiezi, Jiaochangkou and Zhongxing Road. Among them, the entrance and exit of the Jiaochangkou is connected with the exit 3 and 11 of the Jiaochangkou station, the interchange station of Chongqing Railway Line 1 and Line 2, and the upper end of the main staircase of the eighteen stairs is also set up with a special exit for visitors to enter the scenic area. In addition to its garage with more than 5,000 parking spaces, the area is also connected to 20,000 underground parking spaces through the Jiefangbei underground ring road and the eighteen stairs.

In addition, the Chongqing rail transit line 18 under construction sets up the eighteen stairs station.
