= Alfred Gilman =

Alfred Gilman may refer to:

- Alfred G. Gilman (1941–2015), American pharmacologist and biochemist; 1994 Nobel Prize winner
- Alfred Gilman Sr. (1908–1984), his father, American pharmacologist
- Alfred A. Gilman (1878–1966), American missionary and bishop in China
