= Francis Hanson =

Episcopal Church missionaries to China

- The Revd.
- Church: Episcopal Church

Orders
- Ordination: 30 May 1834

Personal details
- Born: 27 March 1807; Durham County, Maryland
- Died: 21 October 1873; Baltimore, Maryland

Francis R. Hanson (27 March 1807 – 21 October 1873) was appointed by The Domestic and Foreign Missionary Society of the Protestant Episcopal Church in America as one of the first two Episcopal Church missionaries to travel to China in 1835.

== Early life ==
Hanson was born in Durham County, Maryland. He graduated from Virginia Theological Seminary in 1833 and was ordained deacon on 19 May 1833 and priest on 30 May 1834.

== Missionary work in China and Indonesia ==
Under the auspices of the Protestant Episcopal Church Mission on 30 June 1834, Hanson and the Rev. Henry Lockwood set sail from New York to Canton, China, as the first missionaries of the Episcopal Church to serve in that country. Finding China too dangerous to set up a permanent mission outpost and even to learn the Chinese language, both missionaries relocated the same year first to Singapore and then to Batavia (modern day Jakarta) to study the Chinese language and set up a mission school serving the local Chinese speaking community.

Hanson and Lockwood's early work in studying the Chinese language and evangelizing to Chinese speakers in Batavia laid the groundwork for missionaries such as Rev. William Jones Boone, later consecrated as the first Bishop of Shanghai and Emma Jones, one of the first women Episcopal missionaries to serve in China.

Due to ill health, Hanson repatriated to the United States in 1838, serving as rector of Trinity Church, Demopolis, Alabama from 1839 until 1851. From 1851 to 1863 he served as rector of St. Andrew's Church, Macon Station, Alabama.
