= Huang Guangcai =

Protestant priest (b. 1827, d. 1886)

- Born: 1827; Xiamen, Fujian, Qing Empire
- Died: November 28, 1886 (aged 58–59); Shanghai, Qing Empire
- Other names: Wong Kong-chai
- Occupation: Anglican priest
- Known for: First Chinese convert and priest of the PECM
- Title: Reverend
- Children: Huang Su'e

Huang Guangcai (or Wong Kong-chai, Chinese: 黃光彩, 1827–1886) was the first Chinese convert, the first candidate to receive the Holy Order and was the first ordained Chinese priest from the Protestant Episcopal Church Mission (PECM).

== Biography ==
Born in 1827 in Xiamen, Fujian, he was a neighbor of the missionary William Jones Boone and was the caretakers of Boone's children, Henry and Mary. He accompanied Boone to the United States in 1843, then returned to China in 1845. In 1846, Boone relocated to Shanghai, but Huang remained in Xiamen to take care of his family. On April 12, 1846, Huang was baptized by Boone in the Bishop's House and became the first convert of the PECM. This was also the first time Boone used Shanghai dialect to baptize a local.

On September 7, 1851, Huang was ordained deacon and became the first native presbyter of the PECM on November 8, 1863. Despite the shortage of funding due to American Civil War, Huang reported in 1872 that since 1859 he had baptized 103 people. From 1872 onwards, he worked at the Church of Our Savior in Hongkou (Hongkew) and by 1879, the church registered around 234 converts. He died on November 28, 1886.

== Personal life ==
His daughter, Huang Su'e (黃素娥) became an Anglican leader as well to help Henrietta F. Boone, wife of William Jones Boone, to establish St. Mary's and supervise student affairs.
