= Frederick Graves =

American missionary and bishop

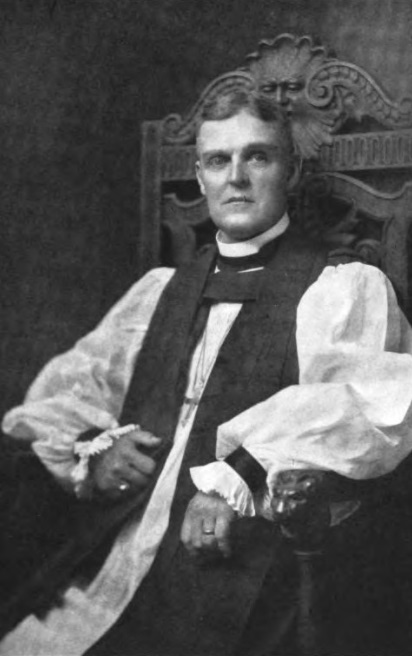
The Rt. Rev. Frederick Rogers Graves

Frederick Rogers Graves (Chinese name: 郭斐蔚; October 23, 1858 – May 17, 1940) was an American missionary to China and was the longest serving bishop in China.

Graves succeeded William Jones Boone to serve as the fifth missionary bishop of the Anglican diocese of Shanghai from 1893 to 1937. Graves assisted in the organization of the Chung Hua Sheng Kung Hui, and served as chairman of its House of Bishops from 1915 to 1926. Due to his position as a bishop, he had heavily involved in the administration of St. John's University, Shanghai. He resigned his see effective October 9, 1937. He was succeeded by William Payne Roberts.

Graves participated in the consecration of a number of other bishops, including

- Daniel Trumbull Huntington
- William Payne Roberts
- James Addison Ingle
- Sidney Catlin Partridge, first Bishop of Kyoto
