= Logan H. Roots (bishop) =

American Episcopal bishop

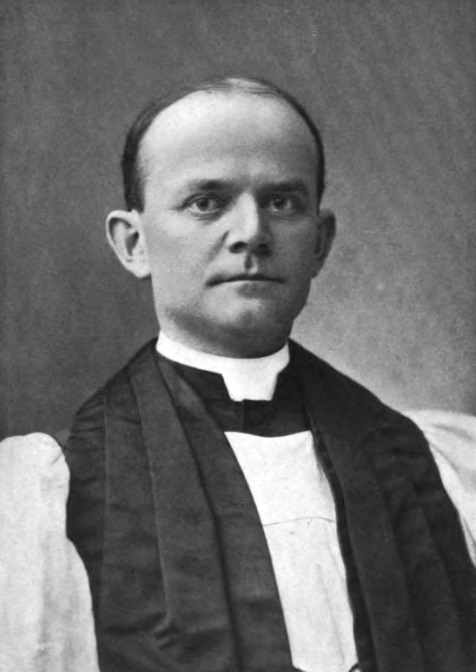
The Rt. Rev. Logan H. Roots

Logan Herbert Roots D.D. (July 27, 1870 – September 23, 1945) was an American missionary to China and from 1904 to 1925 served as the Episcopal Bishop of Hankow.

== Early life and path to ordination ==
Born in Tamaroa, Illinois he attended Harvard College graduating with an A.B. Degree in 1891. At Harvard he was a member of Delta Upsilon fraternity. Roots later attended the Episcopal Theological School in Cambridge, graduating in 1896 and was subsequently ordained deacon.

== Missionary work in China ==
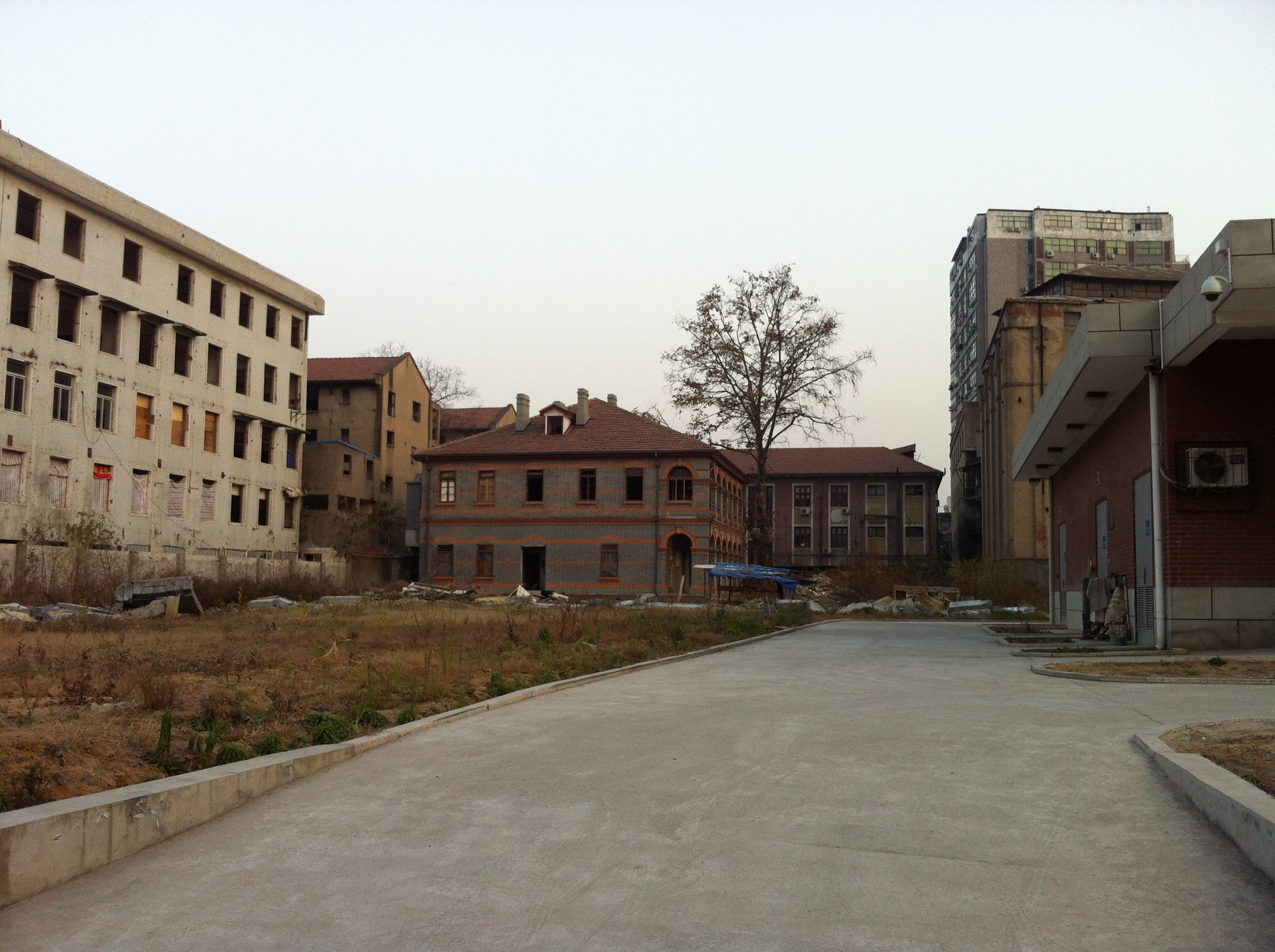
Former Residence of Roots in Wuhan

In the autumn of 1896 Roots crossed the Pacific to start his new life as a church missionary in China. He served there for 42 years. His initial assignment was as an English instructor at the Boone School in Wuchang.

Roots was consecrated at Emmanuel Church in Boston on November 14, 1904, as the second Bishop of Hankow, succeeding James Addison Ingle. The Protestant Episcopal Church Mission in Hankow underwent severe challenges during Roots' period as bishop; Hankow being captured in 1912 during the Xinhai Revolution and the adjacent district of Wuhan becoming one of the main battlegrounds between the imperial and revolutionary forces. St. Paul's Cathedral in Hankow was used as a hospital to treat the battle wounded and normal church activity was very much restricted.

He was in close contact with journalists and politicians, and became known as the ‘Red Bishop’. He also supported the work of the Oxford Group.

Roots was in turn succeeded as bishop in 1925 by Alfred A. Gilman.

Roots was awarded honorary Doctor of Divinity degrees by both the University of the South and Harvard University.

He returned to the United States in 1938 and led the Moral Rearmament movement in New York.

He died in 1945 on Mackinac Island, where he is buried.

== Family ==
In 1902 he married Eliza McCook and they had five children. Their daughter Frances was a musician who was invited to give a concert to the Chinese premier.

== See also ==
- Protestant missions in China 1807-1953
- Christianity in China
- List of Delta Upsilon alumni
