= William Boone =

William Boone may refer to:

- William Boone (American football) (1879–1963), American football coach in the United States
- William E. Boone (1830–1921), American architect
- William K. Boone (1875–1944), benefactor of Xalapa, Veracruz
- William Boone (mathematician) (1920–1983), American mathematician
- William Jones Boone (father) (1811–1864), first Anglican missionary bishop of Shanghai
- William Jones Boone (son) (1845–1891), fourth Anglican missionary bishop of Shanghai
- John William Boone (1864–1927), American ragtime music composer
