= Wang Yongnian =

Chinese translator

- 王永年
- Born: March 17, 1927; Dinghai District, Zhoushan, Zhejiang, China
- Died: July 21, 2012 (aged 85); China
- Education: St. John's University, Shanghai
- Occupation: Translator
- Writing career
- Language: Chinese, English, Russian, Spanish, Italian
- Notable work: The Decameron

Wang Yongnian (Chinese: 王永年; pinyin: Wáng Yǒngnián; 17 March 1927 – 21 July 2012) was a Chinese translator. He was the first person who translated Giovanni Boccaccio's The Decameron in whole texts into Chinese. He was among the first few in China who translated the works of Jorge Luis Borges's into Chinese language. His translations are well respected by domestic and over scholars.

Wang was a member of the China Democratic League.

== Biography ==
Wang was born in Dinghai District, Zhoushan, Zhejiang, on March 17, 1927. His father was the director of the Yunnan Salt Bureau during the Republic of China (1912-1949). He graduated from St. John's University, Shanghai, where he studied alongside Eileen Chang. During the Second Sino-Japanese War, he studied Japanese and Russian. After the establishment of the Communist State, he worked at Translation Publishing House in Shanghai. In late 1950s, the Xinhua News Agency wanted to set up a Spanish Foreign Reporting Group, they looked for talents in Shanghai and through the Shanghai Municipal Committee of the Chinese Communist Party knew that Wang Yongnian of the Translation Publishing House understands Spanish, than he was transferred to Beijing. In the 1980s, he worked as a reporter for Xinhua News Agency in Mexico. He retired in the 1990s. He died of bowel infarction at Xuanwu Hospital in Beijing, on July 21, 2012.

== Personal life ==
Wang had one son and two daughters. His eldest daughter named Wang Jiang (王绛).

== Translations ==
- The Decameron (十日谈)
- Selection of O. Henry's Short Stories (欧·亨利短篇小说选)
- Alice's Adventures in Wonderland (爱丽丝漫游奇境)
- The Garden of Forking Paths (小径分岔的花园)
- The Book of Sand (沙之书)
- The Aleph (阿莱夫)
- Ficciones (杜撰集)
- The Moon in front of Saint Martin's Notes (面前的月亮·圣马丁札记)
- El informe de Brodie (布罗迪报告)
- A Universal History of Infamy (恶棍列传)
- Song of Shadow for Six Strings (为六弦琴而作·影子的颂歌)
- Tales of the Night (夜晚的故事)
- Discussion Set (讨论集)
- The Other (探讨别集)
- Dante Alighieri (但丁九篇)
