= Daniel Huntington (bishop) =

American missionary and bishop

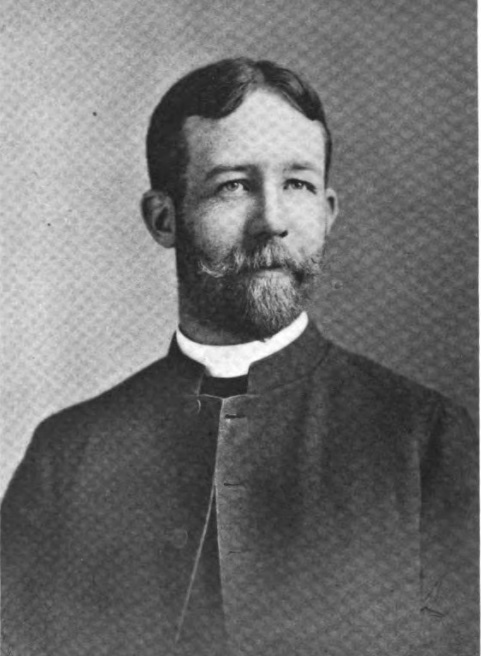
The Rt. Rev. Daniel Trumbull Huntington

Daniel Trumbull Huntington (Chinese name: 韓仁敦; 韩仁敦; born August 4, 1868) was an American missionary to China.

Huntington was born in Norwich, Connecticut, educated at Yale University and ordained in 1896. He was consecrated a bishop on the Feast of the Annunciation 1912 (25 March) by his predecessor Frederick Graves at St John's Pro-Cathedral, Shanghai; he served as Missionary Bishop of Anking and later as sixth missionary bishop of the Anglican diocese of Shanghai.
