= Zhang Changshou =

Chinese archaeologist (1929–2020)

- 张长寿
- Born: 6 May 1929; Shanghai, China
- Died: 30 January 2020 (aged 90); Beijing, China
- Education: St. John's University, Shanghai; Yenching University
- Scientific career
- Fields: Archaeology
- Workplaces: Institute of Archaeology, Chinese Academy of Social Sciences

Chinese name
- Traditional Chinese: 張長壽
- Simplified Chinese: 张长寿
Transcriptions
Standard Mandarin
- Hanyu Pinyin: Zhāng Chángshòu
- Wade–Giles: Chang Ch'ang-shou
- IPA: [ʈʂáŋ ʈʂʰǎŋ.ʂôʊ]

Zhang Changshou (Chinese: 张长寿; 6 May 1929 – 30 January 2020) was a Chinese archaeologist who served as vice director of the Institute of Archaeology, Chinese Academy of Social Sciences (CASS). He was a corresponding member of the German Archaeological Institute and an honorary member of the CASS.

== Life and career ==
Zhang was born 6 May 1929 in Shanghai, Republic of China. He studied in Christian missionary schools as a child and entered St. John's University, Shanghai in 1948. He transferred to Yenching University in Beijing in 1950, graduating in July 1952 with a degree in history. He taught at Liancheng Secondary School (连成中学), an affiliated school of Tsinghua University, for the next four years.

In July 1956, he transferred to the Institute of Archaeology, then under the Chinese Academy of Sciences (part of the Chinese Academy of Social Sciences since 1977), and spent the rest of his career in field archaeology and research of the Shang and Zhou dynasties of ancient China. He was promoted to associate professor in 1979 and full professor and doctoral advisor in 1986. Li Feng was one of the archaeologists he trained at the institute. He served as vice director of the Institute of Archaeology from July 1985 to May 1988. He retired in May 1989, but continued to publish for decades afterwards.

Zhang became a corresponding member of the German Archaeological Institute in December 1988, and was elected an honorary member of the Chinese Academy of Social Sciences in 2006.

He died on 30 January 2020 at Tiantan Hospital in Beijing, aged 90.

== Contributions ==
Zhang participated in many excavation projects with a research focus on the Shang and Zhou dynasties, especially early Zhou sites in the Fenghao region such as the Western Zhou cemetery at Zhangjiapo and the predynastic Zhou site of Fengxi. His excavation report of the Zhangjiapo cemetery, published in 1999, won the first prize of the Outstanding Research Award of the Chinese Academy of Social Sciences in 2002. He was also the chief editor of the book Chinese Archaeology—Zhou Dynasty (中国考古学·两周卷, 2004), which won the 2007 Guo Moruo Chinese History Prize (First Class).

Zhang was the co-principal investigator, together with Robert E. Murowchick of Boston University, of Investigations into Early Shang Civilization, a Sino-American joint field archaeology project initiated by Kwang-chih Chang of Harvard University. The focus of the investigations is Shangqiu, Henan, an area sometimes buried under more than 10 meters (33 ft) of alluvium deposited by the Yellow River over the millennia.

== Major works ==
Excavation reports

- Excavation Report of Fengxi (沣西发掘报告, 1962), co-editor
- The Excavation of Zhangjiapo Western Zhou Tombs of Chang'an in 1967 (1967年长安张家坡西周墓葬的发掘, 1980)
- Primitive Cultural Remains at Chagou in Shilou, Shanxi (山西石楼岔沟原始文化遗存, 1985)
- Zhangjiapo Western Zhou Cemetery (张家坡西周墓地, 1999), editor

Other books

- Archaeological Discoveries of New China (新中国的考古收获, 1961), co-editor
- Recent Archaeological Discoveries in the Peopleʼs Republic of China (新中国的考古发现和研究, 1984), co-editor
- Encyclopedia of China—Archaeology (中国大百科全书•考古学, 1986), co-editor
- Research on the Periodization of Western Zhou Bronzes (西周青铜器分期断代研究, 1999), with Wang Shimin 王世民 and Chen Gongrou 陈公柔
- Chinese Archaeology—Zhou Dynasty (中国考古学·两周卷, 2004), editor
- Western Zhou Jades of Zhangjiapo (张家坡西周玉器, 2007), editor
- Collected Papers on Shang and Zhou Archaeology (商周考古论集, 2007): collection of 35 papers published before 2000
- Wen You's Luozhaotang Collection of Bronze Rubbings (闻宥落照堂藏青铜器拓本, 2010), with Wen You
