= Chen Zhongyi =

Chinese civil engineer (1923–2019)

- Traditional Chinese: 陳仲頤
- Simplified Chinese: 陈仲颐
Transcriptions
Standard Mandarin
- Hanyu Pinyin: Chén Zhòngyí
- IPA: [ʈʂʰə̌n ʈʂʊ̂ŋ.ǐ]
Southern Min
- Hokkien POJ: Tân Tiōng-î

Chen Zhongyi (Chinese: 陈仲颐; July 1923 – 7 October 2019) was a Chinese civil engineer, engineering academic, and politician. He was a professor of Tsinghua University, and served as Vice Chairman of the Central Committee of the Taiwan Democratic Self-Government League and Vice Chairman of the Beijing Municipal Committee of the Chinese People's Political Consultative Conference.

== Biography ==
Chen was born in July 1923 in Taipei, Taiwan. From 1942 to 1945, he studied at the Department of Civil Engineering of St. John's University, Shanghai.

From 1945 to 1949, Chen worked as a technician in the Taiwan Provincial Public Works Bureau, an assistant engineer of the Taiwan Engineering Company, and an assistant director of the US News Service in Taipei. From 1949 to 1950, he was a graduate student at the Georgia Institute of Technology in the United States, and then worked as an engineer in Los Angeles after earning his master's degree.

Chen returned to China in 1951. He served as a lecturer in the Department of Civil Engineering of Yenching University before transferring to the Department of Hydraulic Engineering of Tsinghua University in 1952, where he taught as an associate professor and later professor until 1988. His students included Hu Jintao, the General Secretary of the Chinese Communist Party between 2002 and 2012.

Chen joined the China Democratic League in 1952. In 1980 he joined the Taiwan Democratic Self-Government League (Taimeng). He served as Chairman of Taimeng's Beijing Municipal Committee and Vice Chairman of the 5th Central Committee of Taimeng. He subsequently became an Honorary Vice Chairman of the 6th and 7th Central Committees. He was a member of the 5th to 9th Chinese People's Political Consultative Conference (CPPCC), and served in the Standing Committee of the 7th and 8th CPPCC. He was also a Vice Chairman of the Beijing Municipal CPPCC.

Chen died in Beijing on 7 October 2019, aged 96.
