= William Y. Chang =

American newspaper publisher (1916–2019)

- 鄭玉安
- Born: William Yukon Chang; January 1, 1916; Honolulu, Territory of Hawaii
- Died: September 4, 2019 (aged 103); New York City, U.S.
- Education: St. John's University
- Occupation: Publisher
- Spouse: Tang Kou Mei (m. 1952)
- Children: 3

William Yukon Chang (Chinese: 鄭玉安; January 1, 1916 – September 4, 2019) was a Chinese-American newspaper publisher and community leader who advocated for the Chinese American communities in New York City. He was the founder of the Chinese-American Times newspaper, which operated from 1955 to 1972.

== Early life and education ==
Chang was born in Honolulu, Hawaii on January 1, 1916. His grandparents immigrated from China to Hawaii, making a living raising coffee and running a grocery store. His father, William Sang Chang, was a merchant seaman while his mother, Kui Kyau Lee, was a homemaker. He graduated from McKinley High School in Honolulu and went on to earn a B.A. in journalism from St. John's University in Shanghai, China.

== Career ==
After the Second Sino–Japanese War broke out in Shanghai in 1937, he sailed back to Hawaii and enrolled briefly at the University of Hawai'i in the teacher education program. In 1941, he returned to Shanghai as he found it more stimulating, and the daily English-language newspaper The China Press hired him as a sportswriter.

After the Japanese attack on Pearl Harbor on December 7, 1941, Japanese forces invaded and occupied Shanghai and shut the paper down. Chang had to wear an armband to identify himself as an enemy alien.

In 1947, he left his job as the editor and columnist of The China Press, and moved to New York City. He wrote briefly for The Saturday Evening Post under the byline Yukon Chang.

=== Chinese-American Times ===
While Chang was working as a translator in 1954, Mayor Robert F. Wagner Jr. mentioned to him, "We don’t know what’s going on in your community." After pointing out that there were four newspapers, all of them in Chinese language, Wagner asked, "Shouldn’t you have at least one in English?" In 1964, the newspaper had about 3,000 subscribers.

=== Political and community activities ===
According to The New York Times, he was a "sought-after translator, a confidant to old-school Chinese familial associations, a go-between in landlord-tenant disputes and a voice on the neighborhood’s community board."

== Awards ==
In 2000, Chang received the Museum of Chinese in America's Legacy Award.

== Personal life ==
In 1952, Chang married then-SMC exchange student Tang Kou Mei (湯國梅), the first daughter of Nationalist general Tang Enbo (湯恩伯). They raised three daughters, Dallas, Marina and Priscilla.

Chang died on September 4, 2019, at the age of 103 in New York City.

An archive of his work, The William Yukon Chang Papers, are held by the Columbia University Libraries.

== See also ==
- Chinese people in New York City
