= Alpha Chiang =

American mathematical economist

Alpha C. Chiang
- 蔣中一
- Born: 1927 (age 98–99)

Academic background
- Education: Columbia University

Alpha Chung-i Chiang (born 1927) is an American mathematical economist, Professor Emeritus of Economics at the University of Connecticut, and author of perhaps the most well known mathematical economics textbook; Fundamental Methods of Mathematical Economics.

Chiang's undergraduate studies at St. John's University, Shanghai led to a BA in 1946, and his postgraduates studies at the University of Colorado Boulder an MA in 1948 and at Columbia University a PhD in 1954.

He taught at Denison University in Ohio from 1954 to 1964, serving as Chairman of the Department of Economics in the last three years there. Then he joined the University of Connecticut as Professor of Economics in 1964. He taught for 28 years at the University of Connecticut—becoming in 1992 Professor Emeritus of Economics. He also held Visiting Professorships at New Asia College (Hong Kong), Cornell University, Lingnan College (Hong Kong), and Helsinki School of Economics and Business Administration.

Married to Emily Chiang, he has a son Darryl, and a daughter Tracey. His wide extracurricular interests include ballroom dancing, Chinese opera, Chinese painting/calligraphy, photography, and piano. A piano-music composition of his is featured in Tammy Lum's CD "Ballades & Ballads" (2015).

== Selected publications ==
- Chiang, A. C., (1967). Fundamental methods of mathematical economics. McGraw-Hill, New York. (Now (2005) in 4th Edition with Wainwright, Kevin)
- Chiang, A. C. (1992). Elements of dynamic optimization. McGraw-Hill, New York. Now, published by Waveland Press Inc., Illinois.
