= Ma Yuehan =

Chinese athletics coach (1882–1966)

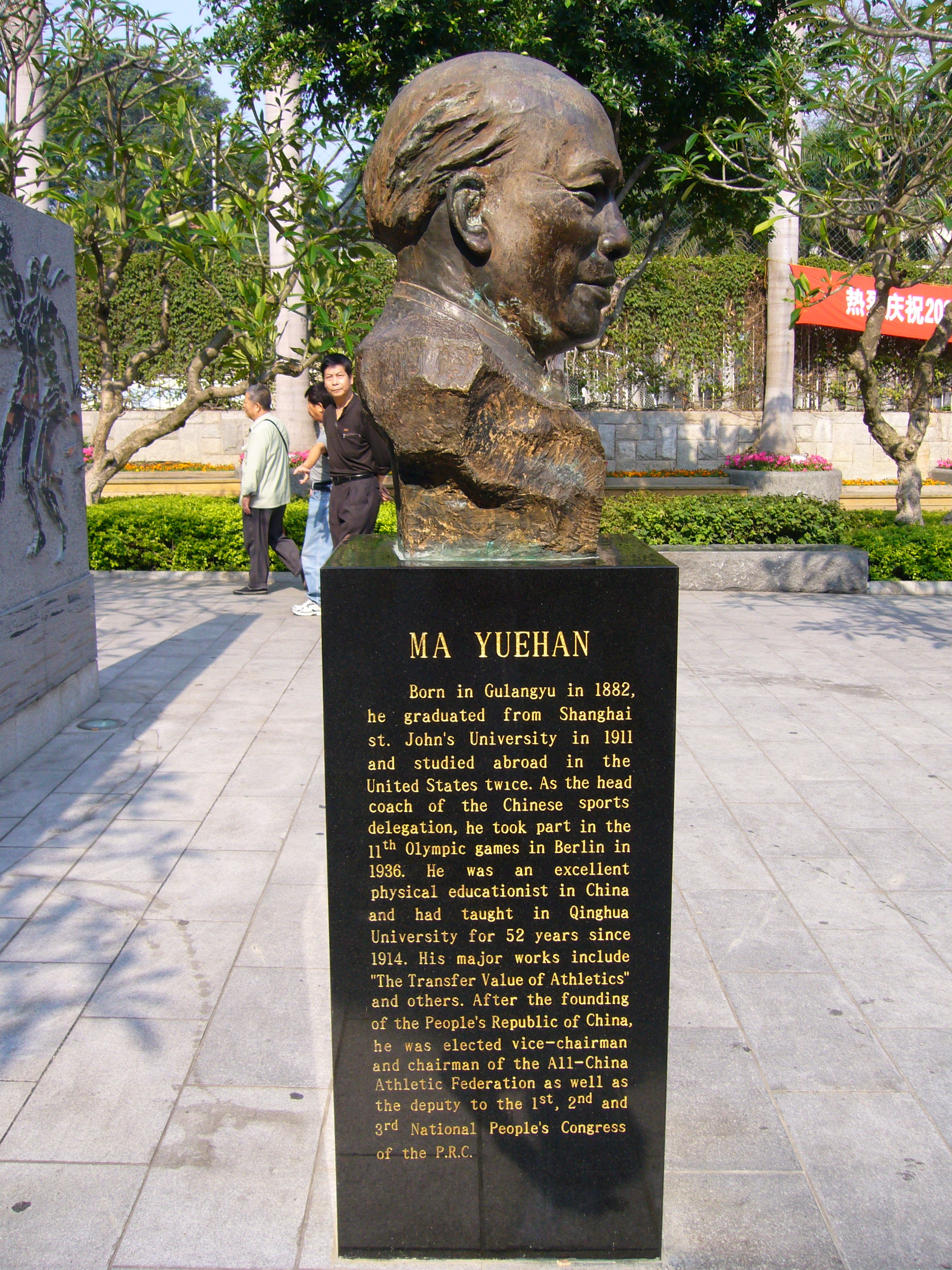
Bronze on Gulangyu Island

Ma Yuehan (Chinese: 马约翰; 1883–1966), or John Ma(John Mo), was a pioneer in physical education and modern Chinese sports. He was a professor of Physical Education at the Tsinghua University for 52 years.

== Early life ==
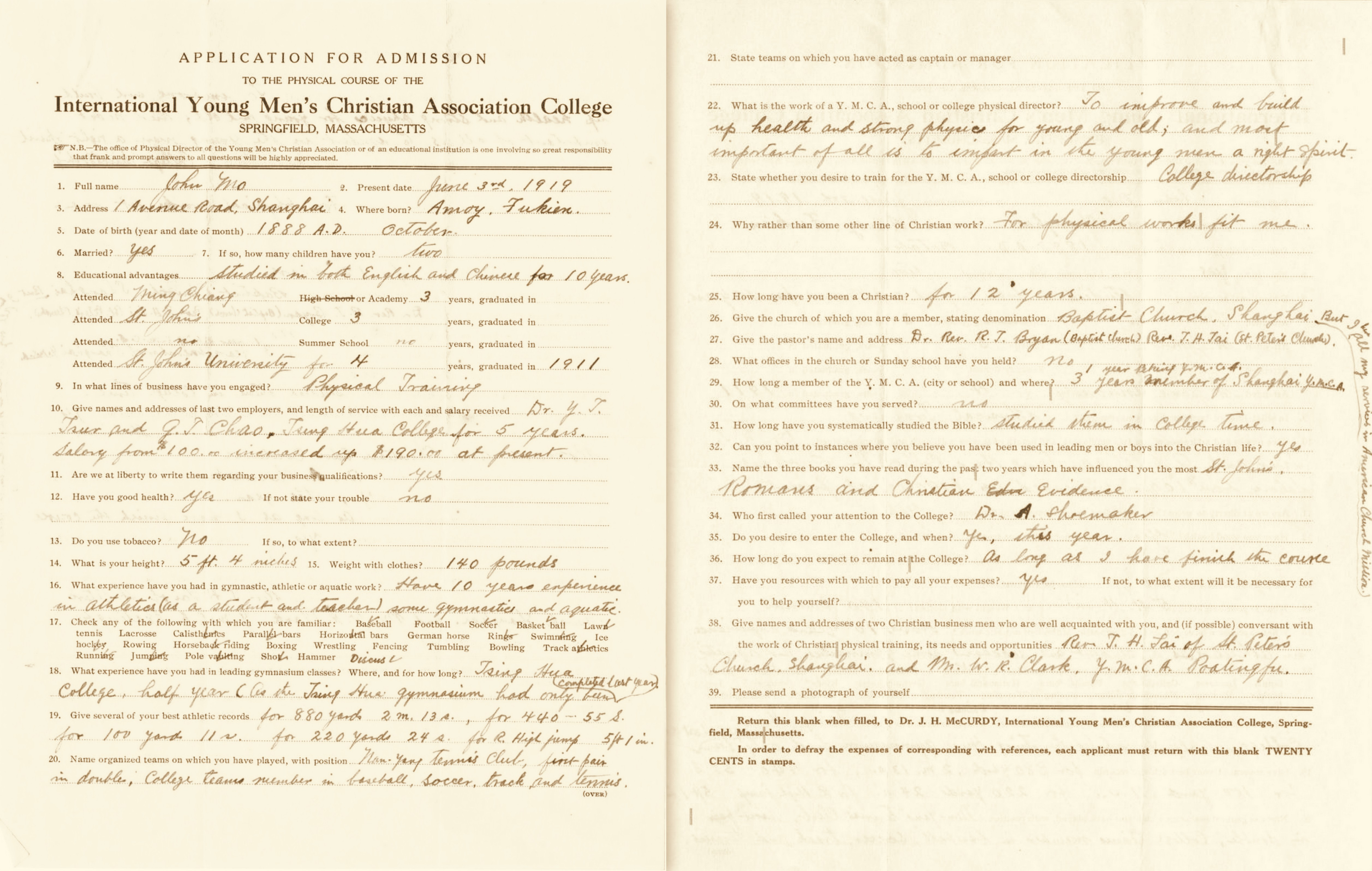
John Mo(Ma Yuehan)'s Application For Admission to Springfield College, 1919

Ma was born in 1882 on Gulangyu Island, Xiamen. He went on to study medicine at St. John's University, Shanghai and graduated in 1911. In 1919, Ma traveled to the United States to earn his BA from Springfield College. After graduating in 1920, he returned to China and was promoted to director of physical education, a position he held for the next nine years. He coached the Tsinghua University soccer team to victory in the North China Championship.

== Career ==
In 1914, Ma worked at Tsinghua University as a physical education teacher. In 1926, he went on furlough and returned to Springfield College to earn his master's degree. From 1931 to 1932, he was the physical education director at Soochow University, and in 1934 he returned to his old position at Tsinghua College. In 1936, he led the Chinese delegation to the 1936 Summer Olympics.

After the founding of the People's Republic of China, he was elected the chairman of the All China Athletic Federation. This enabled him to play a significant contribution to Chinese sports by creating a system of sports school which recruited talented athletes and provide world class training facilities.

== Family ==
Ma's son, Ma Qiwei, served as Vice President of Beijing Institute of Physical Education. His second daughter, Ma Peilun, married Mou Zuoyun, a pioneer of basketball in China. Both Ma Qiwei and Mou Zuoyun followed Ma's footsteps to study at Springfield College in the US.
