= Samuel H. Turner =

Samuel Hulbert Turner (1790–1861) was an American Hebraist.

Turner was born in 1790 in Philadelphia. He was professor of the Hebrew Language and Literature at the General Theological Seminary of the Episcopal Church in New York City from 1830. He was tutor and mentor to Joseph Schereschewsky, later Anglican Bishop of Shanghai.

== Works ==
- A Companion to the Book of Genesis (1846)
- Thoughts on the Origin, Character and Interpretation of Scriptural Prophecy: In Seven Discourses (1856)
- Spiritual Things Compared with Spiritual, Or, the Gospels and Acts Illustrated by the Use of Parallel References (1859)
