= James Addison Ingle =

American missionary and bishop

James Addison Ingle (Chinese: 殷徳生; pinyin: Yīn Déshēng) (11 March 1867 – 7 December 1903) was an American missionary to China and first bishop of the Missionary District of Hankow (Hankou).

== Early life and education ==
Born on March 11, 1867, in Frederick, Maryland, Ingle was the son of the Rev. Osborne Ingle (1837-1909), who served more than four decades as rector of All Saints Church, Frederick, Maryland, and his wife Mary Mills Addison.

Ingle attended the local Frederick schools, then graduated from the Episcopal High School in Alexandria, Virginia. He obtained his B.A. degree from the University of Virginia in 1885 and his M.A. from the same institution in 1888. After teaching at a private academy in Charlottesville in 1886-7, Ingle decided to study for the priesthood. He graduated from Virginia Theological Seminary (in 1891), and was ordained deacon at his home parish, All Saints Church, Frederick, on 29 January 1891 by Bishop William Paret. The same prelate raised to him the priesthood in Baltimore on June 7, 1891, and young Ingle left on a boat for China that October.

== Episcopal mission in China ==
Ingle published the Hankou Syllabary in Shanghai in 1899. In 1901 he was elected missionary bishop for the Missionary District of Hankow. Rt. Rev. Ingle became the first bishop of the American Episcopal Church to be consecrated in China. The consecration service in both English and Chinese took place at St. Paul's Church, Hankou on 24 February 1902. Ingle's principal consecrator was Frederick Rogers Graves.

== Death and legacy ==
Ingle died on December 7 the following year, and was buried in the Old International Cemetery in Hankou. His wife, Charlotte Rhett Thomson Ingle (they married in 1894), survived him by four decades. When she was interred at her family's grave site in Magnolia Cemetery in Charleston, South Carolina, their joint cenotaph remembered Bishop Ingle as well. They had a son (James Ingle Jr.) and daughter (Charlotte Rhett Ingle Lea).

Rt. Rev. Logan Herbert Roots succeeded Ingle as bishop of Hankou. A memorial service was held in his honor at Emmanuel Church, Baltimore, during which Rev. Arthur M. Sherman mentioned Rev. Ingles' dedication to building a native church, and his efforts after the Boxer Rebellion. His Frederick Maryland parish donated funds to establish a scholarship at the Boone Divinity School in China in his memory, which was mentioned at the All Saints Day services in both his parishes.

== See also ==
- Christianity in China

== Bibliography ==
- W. H. Jefferys, James Addison Ingle (Yin Teh-Sen) First Bishop of the Missionary District of Hankow, China (New York: The Domestic and Foreign Missionary Society, 1913) GoogleBooks Archive.org
