= St. John's University, Shanghai =

1879–1952 Christian institute in China

St. John's University
- 聖約翰大學
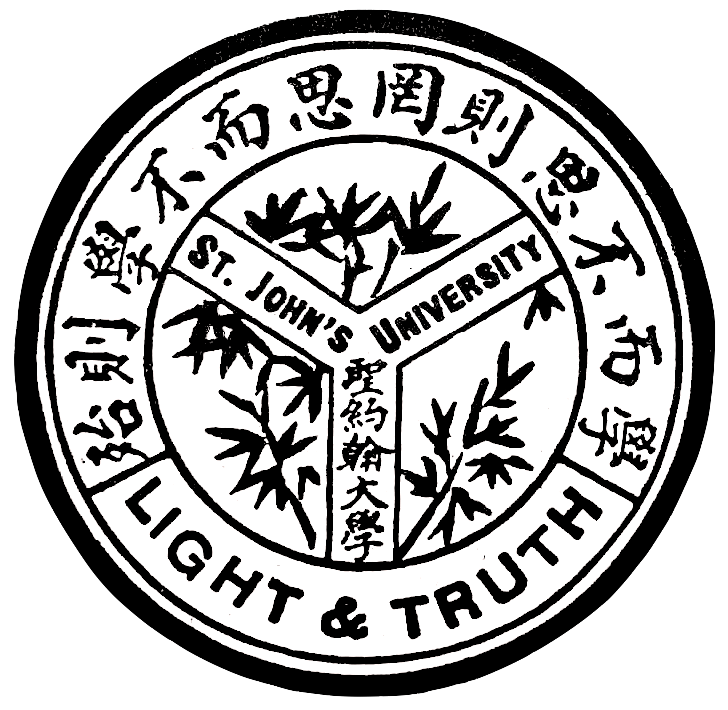
- Motto: 學而不思則罔 思而不學則殆
- Motto in English: Light and Truth
- Type: Private university
- Active: 1879–1952
- Affiliations: Anglican
- President: Francis Lister Hawks Pott
- Location: Shanghai, China

Chinese name
- Traditional Chinese: 聖約翰大學
- Simplified Chinese: 圣约翰大学
Transcriptions
Standard Mandarin
- Hanyu Pinyin: Shèng Yuēhàn Dàxué
- Wade–Giles: Sheng Yüeh-han Ta-hsüeh
- IPA: [ʂə̂ŋ ɥéxân tâɕɥě]

St. John's University (SJU) was a Christian university in Shanghai. It was founded in 1879 by American missionaries.

After the founding of the People's Republic of China, the Communist government closed the university in 1952. Most of its faculty members, students and library collections were transferred to East China Normal University or moved to Taiwan, where the university was reestablished as St. John's University, Taipei. A postwar board of governors moved the mainland assets of the university to Hong Kong, founding Chung Chi College, a part of the Chinese University of Hong Kong. Its former campus at Shanghai is now the urban campus of the East China University of Political Science and Law.

== History ==
=== Foundation as St. John's College ===
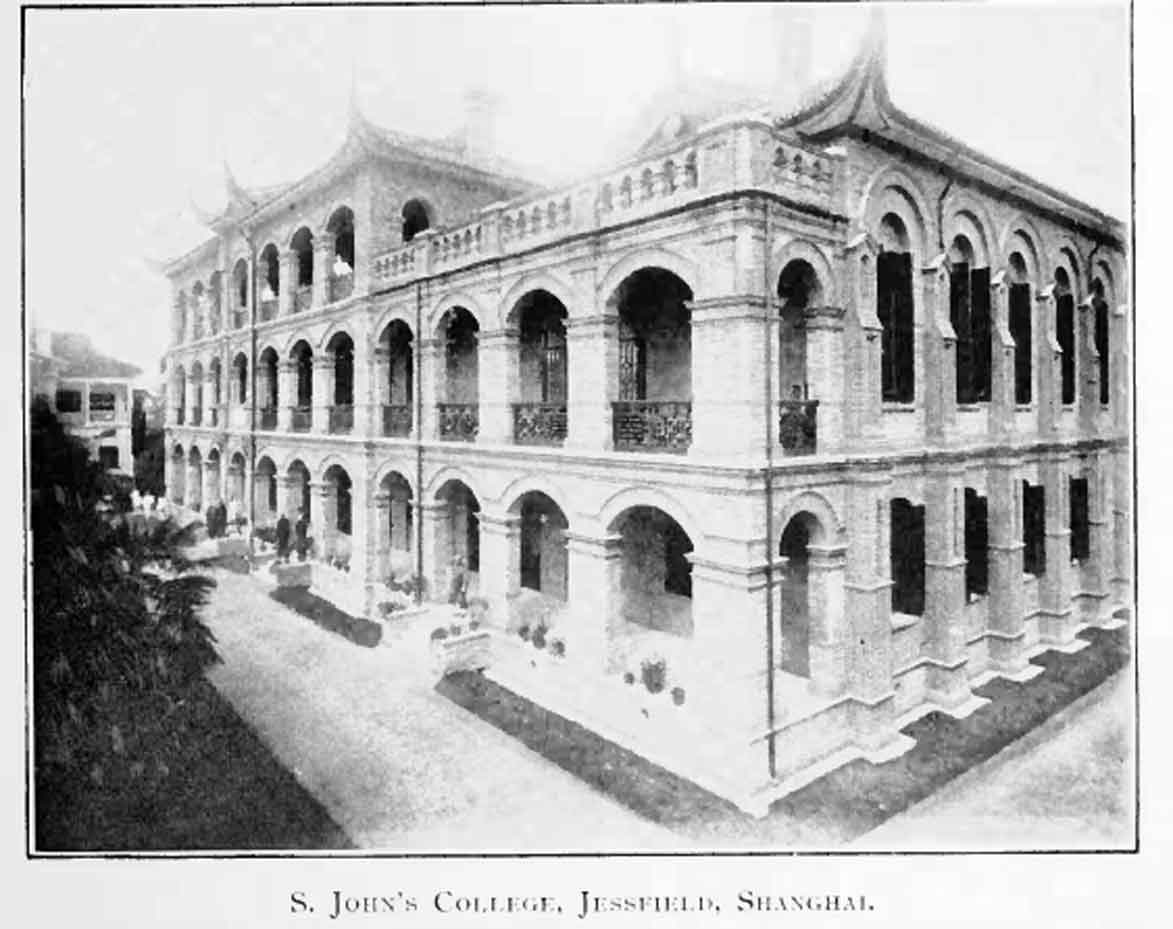
St. John's College on Jessfield Road

The university was founded in 1879 as "St. John's College" by William Jones Boone and Joseph Schereschewsky, Bishop of Shanghai, by combining two preexisting Anglican colleges in Shanghai. The architect for the college's original quadrangle of buildings was Newark, New Jersey architect William Halsey Wood. The first president was Yen Yun-ching (Chinese: 顏永京, 1838–98). During the early period of St. John's College, Lydia Mary Fay (1804–78), a missionary of the Protestant Episcopal China Mission (or the American Church Mission), helped to set up Duane Hall, a secondary school which later became part of St. John's College.

St. John's began with 39 students and taught mainly in Chinese. In 1891, it changed to teaching with English as the main language. The courses began to focus on science and natural philosophy.

=== St. John's University ===
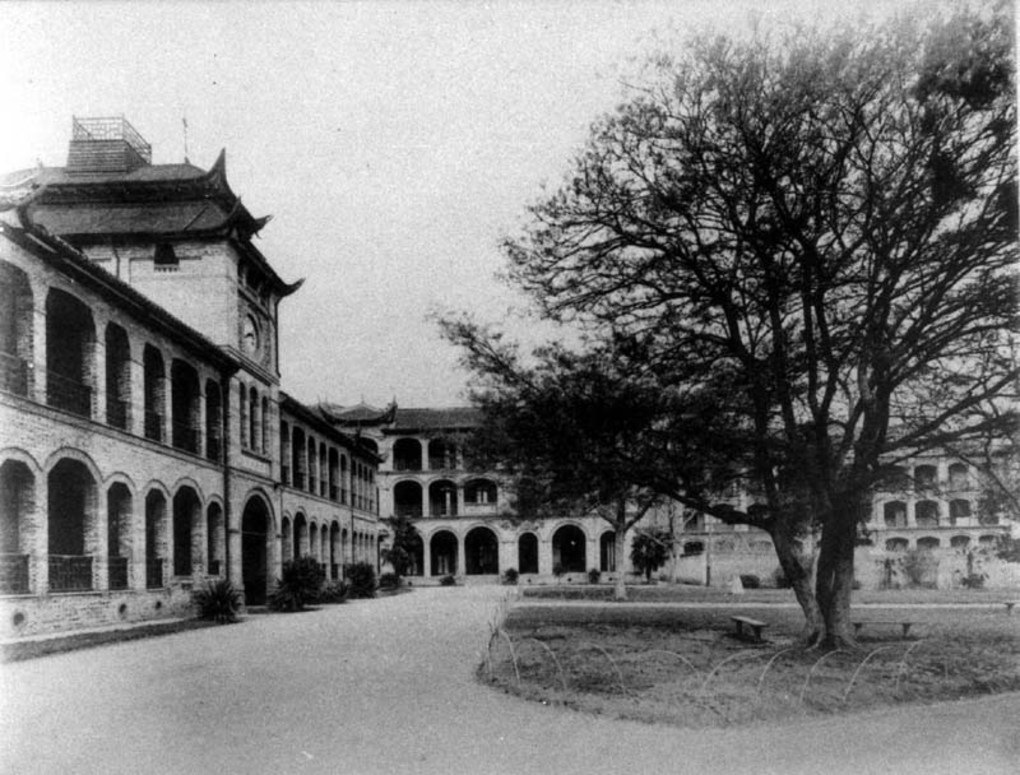
St. John's University in 1905

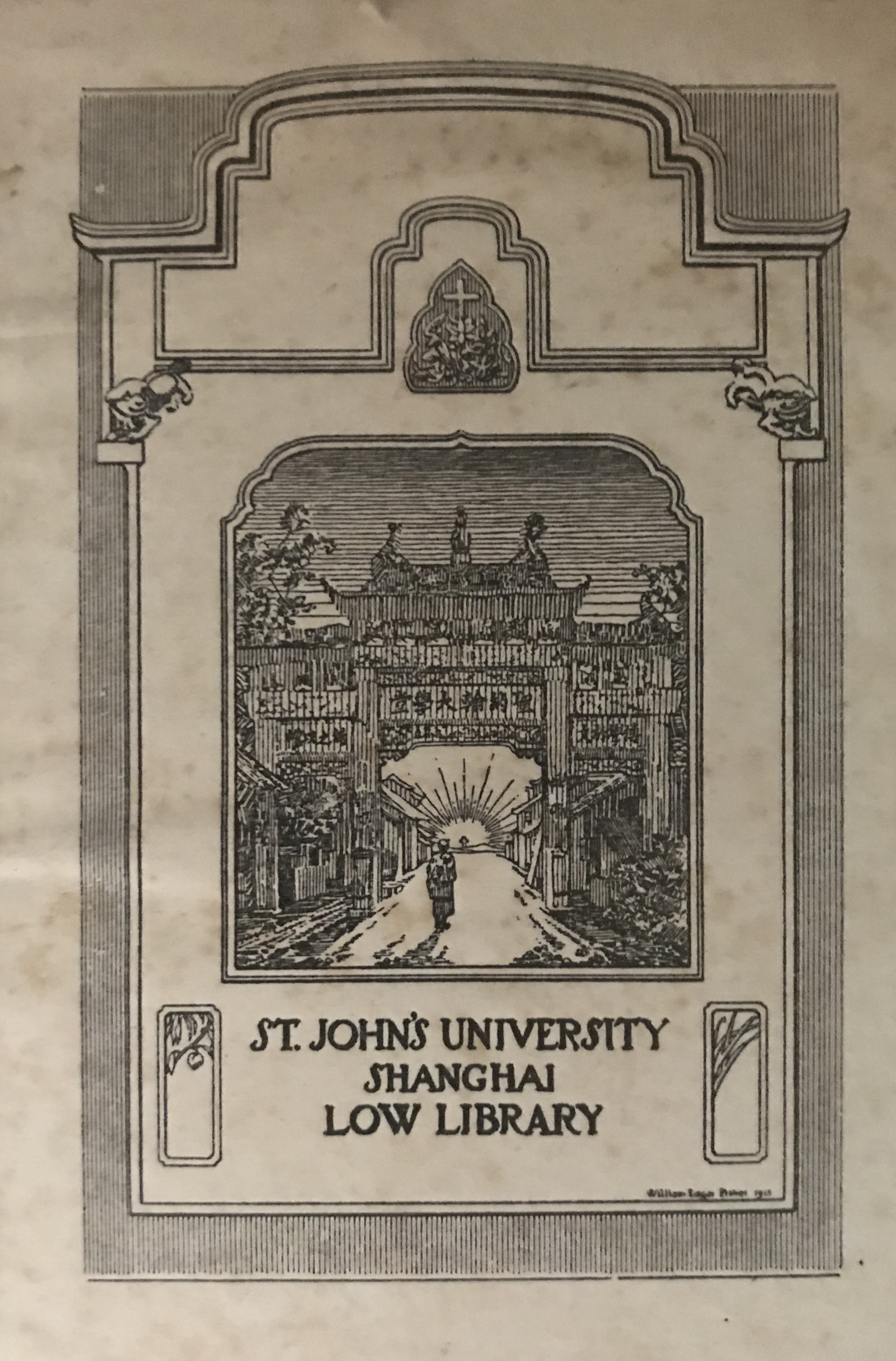
A bookplate of the university library

In 1905, St. John's College became St. John's University and became registered in Washington D.C. in the United States. It thus had the status of a domestic university and American graduates of St. John's could proceed directly to graduate schools in the United States. As a result, the university attracted some of the brightest and wealthiest students in Shanghai at the time. It was the first institution to grant bachelor's degrees in China, starting in 1907.

The university was located at 188 Jessfield Road (now Wanhangdu Lu), on a bend of the Suzhou Creek in Shanghai and was designed to incorporate Chinese and Western architectural elements.

In 1925, some academics and students left St. John's and formed the Kwang Hua University. In 1951, Kwang Hua was incorporated into East China Normal University.

=== Chinese Civil War and disestablishment ===
The university survived World War II and the Chinese Civil War. However, in 1952 the Communist government adopted a policy of creating specialist universities in the Soviet style of the time. Under this policy, St John's was broken up. Most of its faculties were incorporated into the East China Normal University. The medical school was incorporated into Shanghai Second Medical College, which became the School of Medicine, Shanghai Jiao Tong University in 2005. The campus became the site of the East China University of Politics and Law.

After the Cultural Revolution in mainland China, the surviving personnel of the original St. John's University Medical School administration decided to recognize the students who were mandated to transfer and subsequently graduated from Shanghai Second Medical College with a St. John's University Medical School degree; the diploma was signed by their original president of St. John's.

== Notable alumni ==
See also Category:St. John's University, Shanghai alumni

- Clement Chang (1929–2018), a Taiwanese academic and politician
- William Y. Chang – founder of the Chinese-American Times newspaper in New York City
- Chen Chi-lu (1923–2014), minister of the Council of Cultural Affairs of the Republic of China, 1981–1988
- Cheng Tien-hsi (1884–1970), author and jurist, last ambassador of the Republic of China to the United Kingdom
- Irene Chou (1924–2011), artist
- Cheng Youshu (1924–2021), diplomat and poet
- Raymond Chow (1927–2018), filmmaker
- Eileen Chang
- Chung Sze Yuen (1917–2018), Hong Kong politician
- Thomas Dao (1921–2009), physician who developed breast cancer treatment alternatives.
- Robert Fan (1893–1979), architect
- Fu Zaiyuan (1919–2011), Chinese-Japanese entrepreneur and philanthropist
- Francis Hsu (1920–1973), former Catholic bishop of Hong Kong
- Rayson Huang CBE (1920–2015), chemist, vice-chancellor of University of Hong Kong
- Hu Peiquan (1920–2019), engineering mechanician and aerospace engineer.
- Wellington Koo (1888–1985), diplomat, former president of the Republic of China, foreign minister, former judge and vice-president of the International Court of Justice
- Kwan Sung-sing (1892–1960), architect, "father of track and field in Taiwan"
- Lin Yutang (1895–1976), writer
- Liu Hongsheng (1888–1956), industrialist, known as the "King of Matches"
- Liu Tonghua (1929–2018), pathologist, academician of the Chinese Academy of Engineering
- Liu Yichang (1918–2018), writer
- Lu Ping (1927–2015), Chinese politician in charge of the return to China of Hong Kong and Macau
- Ma Yuehan, or John Ma (1883–1966), founder of physical education in modern China
- Meng Xiancheng (1899–1967), educator, the first president of East China Normal University
- Ngan Shing-kwan (1900–2001), Hong Kong transport and property tycoon
- I. M. Pei (1917–2019), architect (attended the university high school)
- Qian Liren (born 1924), Chinese politician and diplomat
- Shi Jiuyong (1926–2022), jurist, former president of the International Court of Justice
- Rong Yiren (1916–2005), "Red Capitalist" founder of CITIC Group and vice president of the People's Republic of China between 1993 and 1998
- Jiang Shaoji (1919–1995), internist and gastroenterologist in China
- Jing Shuping (1918–2009, graduated 1939), businessman, founder of Minsheng Bank, China's first privately owned bank
- Robert Sokal (1926–2012), Austrian–American biostatistician and entomologist
- T. V. Soong (1894–1971), politician and businessman, premier of the Republic of China, brother of the Soong sisters
- K. H. Ting (1915–2012), Anglican bishop and national leader of Protestants in the People's Republic of China
- Frank Tsao (1925–2019), shipping magnate, founder of IMC Group and Malaysia International Shipping Corporation
- Vivian Shun-wen Wu (1913–2008), businesswoman
- Yen Chia-kan (1905–1993), politician, former vice president and president of the Republic of China
- Chou Wen-chung (1923–2019), Chinese American composer of classical music
- Zhou Youguang (1906–2017), linguist
- Wang Yongnian (1927–2012), literary translator
- Yu Hung-chun (1898–1960), or O. K. Yui, premier of the Republic of China
- Zhu Qizhen (1927–2014), deputy foreign minister, Chinese ambassador to the US, and chair of the Foreign Affairs Committee of the National Peoples Congress of China
- Zhang Boling (1876–1951), founder of Nankai University and the Nankai system of schools
- Zhang Changshou (1929–2020), archaeologist
- Chen Zhongyi (1923–2019), engineer, academic, and politician
- Alpha Chiang (born 1927), mathematical economist
- Pauline Woo Tsui (1920–2018), Chinese American women's rights activist

== Administration ==
- Francis Lister Hawks Pott, president of St. John's College 1888 to 1896, president of St. John's University from 1896 to 1941
- William Z.L. (SiLiang) Sung was the vice president of St. John's University under Francis Lister Hawks Pott and later the first Chinese-born acting president during WWII. He was accused of collaboration with the Japanese after the war, imprisoned, and later acquitted. He was helped lead the first two delegations from China to the 1932 and 1936 Olympics. He emigrated to the US and became a priest in the Episcopal church, working as a chaplin with the Diocese of California. He was an undergraduate alumnus of St. John's.
- William Payne Roberts, instructor and acting president in the absence of Pott (needs verification)
- David Z.T. Yin, rector of the university, was a distinguished Chinese scholar who had represented the YMCA in Shanghai at the turn of the century.

== Institutions with names that commemorate SJU ==
To keep the school's traditions alive, SJU alumni (called Johanneans) have founded three academic institutions bearing the same name:

- In Tamsui District, Taiwan, St. John's University was established in 1967;
- In Vancouver, St. John's College at the University of British Columbia was established in 1997, and
- In Shanghai, St. John's College at the East China Normal University will open its door in 2016.

== See also ==
- St. John's University (Taiwan)
- St. Mary's Hall, Shanghai
- Cameron Farquhar McRae (born 1873)
