= Mou Zuoyun =

Chinese basketball player, coach, and pioneer

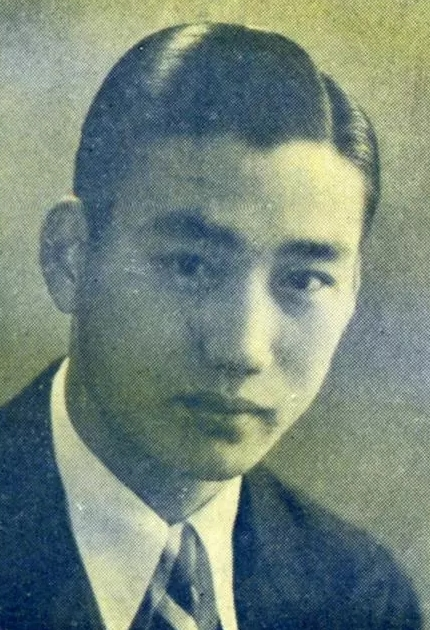
Mou Zuoyun, circa 1936

Mou Zuoyun (Chinese: 牟作雲; Wade–Giles: Mou Tso-yün; 18 December 1913 – 16 March 2007) was a Chinese basketball player, coach, and pioneer, known as the "godfather of Chinese basketball". He competed in the 1936 Summer Olympics as a member of China's first Olympic basketball team, and coached the Chinese men's team at the 1952 Summer Olympics. He served as president of the Chinese Basketball Association (CBA) and was named Lifetime Honorary President of the Asian Basketball Association. In 2005, the CBA named the championship trophy of China's professional basketball league the Mou Zuoyun Cup. In 2019, he posthumously became the first Chinese inductee to the FIBA Hall of Fame.

== Early life and 1936 Summer Olympics ==
Mou Zuoyun was born in 1913 into a peasant family in Wuqing, Hebei (now part of Tianjin municipality), Republic of China. When he was a student at Yuying School (now Beijing No. 25 Middle School), he was selected into the national basketball team to compete in the 1934 Far Eastern Championship Games held in Manila, and won the silver medal.

In 1935, Mou entered the Department of Physical Education of Beijing Normal University and joined the university's basketball team. A year later, he was again selected into the Republic of China national team to compete in the 1936 Summer Olympics in Berlin. It was the first time basketball became an Olympic sport and the first time China sent a full delegation to the Olympic Games. Because of political instability and shortage of funds, the delegation endured a 17-day sea journey to Germany and the team was soon eliminated.

== Wartime refuge and study abroad ==
Upon graduation in 1937, Mou was hired by Beijing Normal University as a faculty member, However, the Second Sino-Japanese War broke out in July, and Beijing soon fell to Japanese occupation. Together with many professors and students in northern China, Mou sought refuge in inland Kunming, Yunnan province, where they established the temporary National Southwestern Associated University. Mou was hired by John Ma, the founder of China's modern physical education, as the university's basketball coach. He married Ma's second daughter, Ma Peilun, in 1944.

After the end of World War II, Mou went to the United States in 1946 for a two-year graduate program at Springfield College, the birthplace of basketball where John Ma had graduated from. He earned his bachelor's degree in physical education the next year, and intended to complete the graduate program. He cut his study short to return to China when he was appointed the coach of the Chinese national team for the 1948 Summer Olympics. For political reasons, however, the appointment was later rescinded.

== People's Republic of China ==
After the Communist Party won the Chinese Civil War and established the People's Republic of China (PRC) in 1949, Mou was appointed the head coach of the China men's national basketball team. In 1952, he led the PRC national team to compete in the Helsinki Olympic Games. However, due to a dispute over whether the PRC or the ROC, which had fled to Taiwan after losing the war, was the legal government of China, the PRC delegation arrived late to the Olympics and his team was unable to compete.

Mou was appointed vice president of the Chinese Basketball Association (CBA) in 1956 and president in 1973. He spent decades training players and building up the sport in China, and oversaw to the rise of both the Chinese men's and women's teams to the top in Asia.

Mou retired in 1997. In recognition to his contributions to the sport, he was named Lifetime Honorary President of the Asian Basketball Association and a Lifetime Honorary Committee Member of FIBA.

In 1999, Mou was named one of the 50 greatest contributors to basketball in China. In 2005, the CBA named the championship trophy of China's professional basketball league the Mou Zuoyun Cup.

Mou died on 16 March 2007, aged 94. When the Chinese player Yao Ming was inducted into the Naismith Memorial Basketball Hall of Fame in 2016, he paid tribute to Mou in his speech. In 2019, Mou was posthumously inducted into the FIBA Hall of Fame; he was the first Chinese inductee. His daughter and grandson attended the award ceremony on his behalf.
