= Anglican Diocese of Shanghai =

The Diocese of Shanghai was an American Anglican bishopric that was involved in missionary work in China during the late Qing dynasty.

== Episcopal mission in China ==
The bishopric at Shanghai served as the mission's national headquarters. Following Mr. Lockwood, William Jones Boone went to Batavia in 1837. He afterwards moved to Amoy, but in 1843 he was appointed to Shanghai and was made the missionary bishop of Shanghai. Boarding and day schools were quickly established, a medical hospital opened, and Samuel Isaac Joseph Schereschewsky was commissioned to prepare a new version of the Bible in the Mandarin dialect which he completed in 1875. There was also in Shanghai a medical school for the training of native physicians, surgeons and nurses as well as a college for the training of native missionaries. There were other stations at Wuchang, Hankow, Yantai and Beijing which, including those at Shanghai, in 1890 comprised 43 places of worship, ten missionaries, three medical agents, three women agents, seventeen ordained native ministers, three unordained helpers and about five hundred communicants.

== Missionary districts ==
At its general convention in 1844, the Protestant Episcopal Church in the United States of America (now called The Episcopal Church) voted to ordain a missionary bishop for the Chinese empire and elected William Jones Boone to the position. Boone was consecrated a bishop a few days after the convention, on October 26, 1844, at St Peter's, Philadelphia. In 1874, the general convention voted to divide the Missionary District of China and Japan into two missionary districts: that of Shanghai (for all China) and that of Yedo (for all Japan); when that convention failed to elect a bishop for Shanghai, the care of that jurisdiction was assigned to Williams (who had become Missionary Bishop of Yedo during that convention) until a new bishop was consecrated for Shanghai. On October 7, 1901, the general convention approved Graves' resolution to divide the jurisdiction (described as "China and the lower Yangtse valley") in two, creating the new Missionary District of Hankow ("to consist of the Provinces of Nganhwai and Hupeh and those portions of Kiangsi and Hunan adjacent to the Yangtse River") and the continuing Missionary District of Shanghai ("to consist of the Province of Kiangsu"). By 1907, Graves was generally called simply "Bishop of Shanghai".

== Missionary bishops ==
- 1844–1864: William Jones Boone (father), Missionary Bishop of China/of China and Japan
- 1866–1877: Channing Moore Williams, Missionary Bishop of China and Japan (until 1874), of Yedo and of Shanghai (thereafter)
- 1877–1884: Samuel Isaac Joseph Schereschewsky, Missionary Bishop of Shanghai
- 1884–?: William Jones Boone (son), Missionary Bishop of Shanghai
- 1893–1937: Frederick Graves, (Missionary) Bishop of Shanghai
- 1937–1950: William P. Roberts, Bishop of Shanghai

== Assistant bishops ==
- 1946–?: Mao Ke Chung (later diocesan Bishop of Kiangsu)

== See also ==
- Anglican Church in China
- Category:Anglican dioceses in China
