= Liu Tonghua =

Chinese physician and pathologist

Liu Tonghua (Chinese: 刘彤华; 13 November 1929 – 8 July 2018) was a Chinese physician and pathologist. She was a professor and doctor at the Peking Union Medical College and its affiliated hospital. She was elected an academician of the Chinese Academy of Engineering in 1999.

== Biography ==
Liu was born on 13 November 1929 in Wuxi, Jiangsu, Republic of China. She received her M.D. in 1953 from the Medical School of St. John's University, Shanghai.

After medical school, she worked at the Peking Union Medical College (PUMC) and the PUMC Hospital for more than 50 years. She specialized in the pathology of the lymph nodes and diseases of the digestive system. In the 1970s, she and Chen Minzhang performed China's first endoscopy, greatly improving the diagnosis of stomach cancer. She spent two decades researching gene therapies for pancreatic cancer and neuroendocrine tumors. For her contributions, she received the State Science and Technology Progress Award (Second Class), Outstanding Medical Contributions Award from the State Council, and many other awards. She was elected an academician of the Chinese Academy of Engineering in 1999.

Liu died on 8 July 2018 at the Peking Union Medical College Hospital, at the age of 88.
