= William P. Roberts (bishop) =

American missionary and bishop

William Payne Roberts (Chinese: 罗培德) was an American missionary to China. Roberts was consecrated in Holy Trinity Cathedral, Shanghai on November 30, 1937, as "Bishop with jurisdiction in the Diocese of Kiangsu of the Chinese Holy Catholic Church (Missionary District of Shanghai)" by Frank Norris, Bishop of North China; assisted by Frederick Graves, Roberts' predecessor; and Sing Tsae-Seng, Assistant Bishop of Chekiang.

He attended Yale College, graduating B.A. in 1909 before studying for the B.D. at Episcopal Theological School in Cambridge, Massachusetts. Roberts taught at Saint John's University, Shanghai from his arrival in China in 1914 until 1920. From 1923 until his consecration as bishop, he served as priest at St. Paul's Church, Nanking. He was nominated for consecration by the General Synod of the Chung Hua Sheng Kung Hui at Foochow in April, 1937. His consecration was attended by Bishop John of Shanghai and San Francisco with a delegation of five Russian Orthodox priests.

Roberts was elected to his American See on October 16, 1937; and resigned it effective April 12, 1950; he was the last American bishop consecrated to work in the Chung Hua Sheng Kung Hui.

== Consecrators ==
- Frederick Rogers Graves
- Francis Lushington Norris
- T.S. Sing

== See also ==
- Christianity in China
