= Liu Hongsheng =

Chinese industrialist (1888–1956)

- 刘鸿生
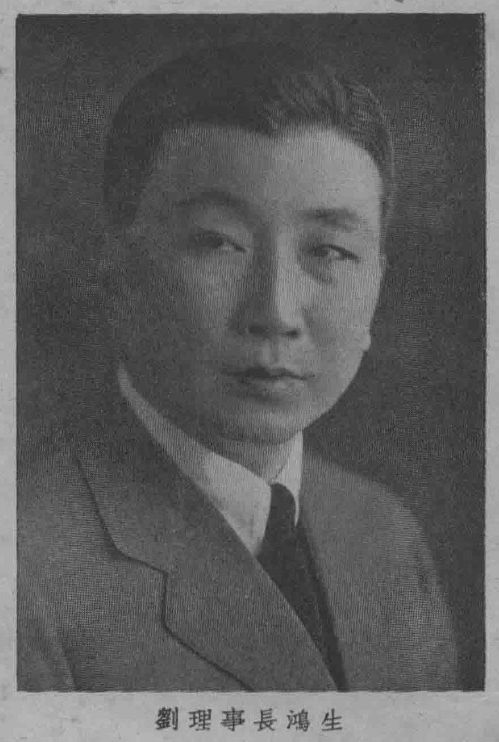
- Born: 1888; Shanghai, China
- Died: October 1, 1956 (69 years old)
- Education: St. John's Middle School; St. John's University
- Occupations: businessman investor
- Title: Kailuan Mining Administration (comprador, 1909)
- Spouse: Ye Suzhen (m. 1907)

Liu Hongsheng (Chinese: 刘鸿生; 1888 – 1 October 1956) known as the "King of Matches" and the "King of Wool", was one of Shanghai's leading industrialists during the Republican Period. Liu was one of China's most prominent businessmen, investing in the manufacture of matches and many other industries such as cement, coal, and wool textiles from the 1920s through the 1940s.

Considered a "nationalist capitalist" by the Chinese Communist Party, Liu's family was one of the few pre-1949 industrialists that received protections from the government. Liu served as a representative from Shanghai to the first National People's Congress and was a member of the Chinese People's Political Consultative Conference.

== Early life ==
Liu was born in Shanghai in 1888 to parents from Ningbo, a prefecture ninety miles southeast of Shanghai that was known for its successful merchants and financiers. His father worked at China's largest Chinese-owned shipping firm, China Merchants Steam and Navigation Company. Liu's father died at the age of thirty-five in 1894, when Liu was only six years old. His father's premature death plunged the family into a tight financial situation, and Liu feel the need to begin laying plans for a future in business at a relatively young age. Liu Hongsheng attended St. John's Middle School and St. John's University on a scholarship. St. John's University was one of China's most prestigious colleges at the time, and known for producing Shanghai's business elite. Liu learned English, studied business, and established a network with classmates at St. John's, building a foundation for a future as an internationally connected businessman. However, due to inadequate funds as a teenager, he left the university before he could graduate.

On October 30, 1907, at the age of nineteen, Liu married Ye Suzhen in their hometown of Shanghai. Ye came from a family that saw themselves as part of a distinguished merchant dynasty that had descended from Ye Chengzhong, one of Shanghai's richest Chinese merchants. She helped Liu make a start in business by bringing a dowry with her into the Liu household and serving as a channel for the transfer of other funds from the Ye family to the Lius.

== Business ventures ==
Liu's career in business and industry began in 1909. He took a job as a comprador at the Kailuan Mining Administration, a Sino-British coal-mining company, where he rapidly rose up the corporate ladder. He took advantage of contacts in his Ningbo native-place network to distribute Kailuan's coal and mobilize capital from Shanghai's banks.

In the 1920s, he used this capital to establish several major enterprises spanning many industries—coal distribution, wharf operations, and the manufacture of wool textiles, cement, and matchsticks. Companies under his name included the China Coal Briquette Company, Shanghai Portland Cement Works Company Limited, Greater China Match Company, China Wool Manufacturing Company Limited, East China Coal Mining Company, and Chung Hwa Wharf Company. By the mid-1930s, his total investment amounted to nearly ten million Chinese dollars, and Liu had become the single largest shareholder of his major operations. The breadth of his business ventures earned Liu the title of "King of Industry".

In the early 1930s, Liu also ventured into the banking and insurance sectors by founding the China Development Bank and the China General Insurance Company.

=== Greater China Match Company ===
Liu earned the nickname of "Match King" by founding and operating the Greater China Match Company, the largest and most successful matchstick enterprise of China's Republican Era. Liu entered the match industry in 1920, founded the China Match Company in 1930, and by 1937 had secured 55 percent of the match market in the Lower and Middle Yangzi and Southeast China, three times more than his closest rival.

In 1920, Liu built his first match factory, the Hongsheng (Hong Sung) Match Mills, in the city of Suzhou. By the late 1920s, his Suzhou factory ranked third highest in production and sales of any Chinese-owned match manufacturer in the Lower Yangzi region, and his second factory at Jiujiang ranked first in the Middle Yangzi region. In 1930, Liu decided to launch his business into the more competitive markets of his hometown of Shanghai. In July 1930, he persuaded two other Chinese match manufacturers to join him in forming a combine, named the China Match Company, with Liu as general manager. This allowed Liu to quadruple his matchstick production. By the end of 1930, Liu also bought the two largest match companies in the Middle Yangzi region and several smaller ones there. At the height of the anti-Japanese boycott between July 1931 and June 1932, China Match supplied 46.2 percent of the matches sold in the Lower Yangzi and 72.7 percent of those sold in the Middle Yangzi.

In the mid-1930s, amid broken price agreements and vicious price wars, Liu Hongsheng took the lead in forming a Shanghai-based interregional match cartel. Under the auspices of the National Match Manufacturers' Association, in July 1934 Liu established the Joint Sales Office with headquarters in Shanghai.

== Relations with the government ==
=== Republican Era ===
Right up until the last year of the Chinese Civil War in 1948, Liu Hongsheng remained aligned with Chiang and the Nationalists. In 1932–1934, Liu had been the director of the state-owned China Steam Navigation Company, and in 1936–1937, he served as head of the Chinese National Joint Production and Sales Union for Matches, a state-sponsored cartel. During the Sino-Japanese War, Liu followed Chiang Kai-shek to Chongqing, where he presided over the government's cigarette and match monopoly. Liu returned to Shanghai at the end of the war in 1945, where he served as the government's chief director of the Chinese National Relief and Rehabilitation Administration and director of its Shanghai regional office. However, after the Nationalist government's failure to halt runaway inflation and the Nationalists repeatedly referring to Chinese capitalists as "traitorous merchant-speculators", Liu briefly fled to Hong Kong in May 1949 and severed his ties with the Nationalist government.

=== Communist Era ===
In November 1949, Liu was persuaded to return to Shanghai by members of his family and top leaders in the Communist Party. Thus began his time as one of China's top "nationalist capitalists," who were regarded as patriotic and encouraged to stay as citizens of the People's Republic. He was immediately appointed to the Shanghai Political Consultative Committee, and soon became a member of the Shanghai People's Congress.

In 1952, the Chinese Communist Party's Five-Anti Campaign elevated Liu to positions of national leadership. The Five-Anti Campaign aimed to denounce capitalists, but the Liu family was exonerated and declared to be model national capitalists. He became a representative from Shanghai to the first National People's Congress and a member of the Chinese People's Political Consultative Conference.

== Later life ==
Liu's heart disease caused him to be in poor health by late 1955. By early 1956, Liu had fully transferred all his industries, worth over 20 million RMB, to joint state-private ownership. Liu succumbed to his heart disease on October 1, 1956, at the age of 69.
