= Alfred A. Gilman =

American bishop

Alfred Alonzo Gilman (August 23, 1878 – September 13, 1966) was an American missionary to Asia. He was born in North Platte, Nebraska, and graduated Phi Beta Kappa from the University of Nebraska in 1898. He was a member of Delta Tau Delta fraternity. He studied for ordination to the priesthood at Philadelphia Divinity School, graduating in 1901. He arrived in China as a missionary in 1902, and was bishop of Missionary District of Hankow in the Chung Hua Sheng Kung Hui. In 1917 he became president of Boone University in Wuchang.

Gilman married Gertrude Carter at St. Paul's Church, Hankou, China, on February 22, 1905. After consecration as suffragan bishop of Hankou on March 4, 1925, he succeeded Logan Herbert Roots and was installed as third Missionary Bishop of Hankou on April 12, 1938.

== Consecrators ==
- Logan Herbert Roots
- Frederick Rogers Graves
- Daniel T. Huntington

== See also ==
- Christianity in China
