= Protestant Episcopal Church Mission =

Missionary initiative of the Episcopal Church

The Protestant Episcopal Church Mission (PECM, also known as the American Church Mission) was a Christian missionary initiative of the Episcopal Church that was involved in sending and providing financial support to lay and ordained mission workers in growing population centers in the west of the United States as well as overseas in China, Liberia and Japan during the second half of the 19th Century.

== Establishment ==
The establishment of the Domestic and Foreign Missionary Society (DFMS) by the 1821 General Convention of the Episcopal Church initially combined the voluntary and centralized modes of missionary support, for it was an official organ of the church, but members paid voluntary dues. After this version of the DFMS proved to have little appeal, the 1835 General Convention took the major step of amending the DFMS constitution to read, "The Society shall be considered as comprehending all persons who are members of this Church." Although solving the membership problem, this change had a strong theological motivation, as expressed at the time by George Washington Doane, bishop of New Jersey, to the DFMS directors:

In an address of great power, he argued "that by the original constitution of Christ, the Church as the Church, was the one great Missionary Society; and the Apostles, and the Bishops, their successors, his perpetual trustees; and this great trust could not, and should never be divided or deputed." The duty, he maintained, to support the Church in preaching the Gospel to every creature, passed on every Christian via the baptismal vow, and they could never be absolved from it.

== Mission ==
Legislating that every Episcopalian was a member of the Domestic and Foreign Missionary Society emphasized that the Church as a whole was called to mission, which defined the church's nature. Thus, the argument ran, mission could not be delegated to one part of the Church, still less to the purely voluntary inclinations of some of its members. Instead it must be embraced by the whole church and expressed through the missionary activity of each of its baptized members. This view constitutes the precedent for today's emphasis in many denominations on baptismal mission and on the missional nature of the church.

Reinforcing also the contemporary recognition that local and global concerns are inter-related and equally important, the 1835 DFMS constitution declared the unity of the mission field:

For the guidance of the Committees [for Domestic Missions and for Foreign Missions] it is declared that the missionary field is always to be regarded as one, THE WORLD — the terms domestic and foreign being understood as terms of locality adopted for convenience. Domestic missions are those established within the United States, and foreign missions are those established without.

This insistence on the unity of mission contrasted with the exclusive emphases of British societies, with some devoted to domestic concerns and others to foreign.

== Duty ==
Creating the office of Missionary Bishop, a senior ordained clergyman sent to establish the church in a particular area, was the third major contribution of the 1835 General Convention. Laying the theological foundation of this innovation, Doane declared that a missionary bishop

. . . is a bishop sent forth by the Church, not sought for of the Church; going before to organize the Church, not waiting till the Church has partially been organized; a leader not a follower, in the march of the Redeemer’s conquering and triumphant Gospel . . . sent by the Church, even as the Church is sent by Christ.

In addition to stressing the apostolic role of a bishop as one sent to preach the gospel, this innovation was premised on the view that the presence of a bishop meant that the Church itself was present and that a bishop in such circumstances had authority to “grow the church” from that simple fact of presence. As a voluntary society, the Church Missionary Society in the Church of England, by contrast, believed that the episcopate should be the culmination, not the foundation, of church growth and that, in any case, the first bishop should be an indigenous Christian, not a missionary.

The 1835 convention employed the new office first to build the Church's work on the western frontier and elected missionary bishops for the northwest and southwest. Jackson Kemper (now commemorated in the Episcopal calendar on 24 May) was consecrated at convention as the first missionary bishop, and through his constant travels he laid the foundations of the Church in Missouri, Indiana, Iowa, Wisconsin, Minnesota, Nebraska and Kansas.

== Mission work in China ==
The first missionary bishop with a non-US jurisdiction was William Boone, elected in 1844 to be bishop of “Amoy and Other Parts of China”, where Episcopal missionaries had first arrived in 1835.

The Protestant Episcopal Mission had its headquarters in Shanghai. Following Mr. Lockwood, Rev. W. J. Boone, D.D., went out in 1837 to Batavia. He afterwards removed to Amoy, but in 1843 he was appointed to Shanghai, and made the missionary bishop of China. Speedily, boarding and day schools were established, a medical hospital opened, and Dr. Samuel Isaac Joseph Schereschewsky was set apart to prepare a new version of the Bible, in the Mandarin dialect, which he completed in 1875. There was also in Shanghai a medical school for the training of native physicians, surgeons and nurses, and a college for the training of native missionaries. There were other stations at Wuchang, Hankow, Yantai, and Beijing, which, including those at Shanghai, in 1890 comprised forty-three places of worship, ten missionaries, three medical agents, three lady agents, seventeen ordained native ministers, three unordained helpers, and about five hundred communicants.

An extraordinary missionary bishop was Samuel Isaac Joseph Schereschewsky, whose story (commemorated on 14 October) illustrates both remarkable mission achievement and the appeal of Anglicanism to pilgrims whose journey is cosmopolitan and inter-religious. Born a Lithuanian Jew, Shereschewsky studied to become a rabbi. While pursuing graduate work in Germany, however, he became interested in Christianity through missionaries of the London Society for Promoting Christianity Amongst the Jews, a voluntary ecumenical group. In 1854 he emigrated to the United States, where he studied for the Presbyterian ministry before becoming an Episcopalian and graduating from the General Theological Seminary in New York in 1859. Responding to Boone's call for helpers in China, he learned to write Chinese on board ship across the Pacific and translated the Bible and parts of the prayerbook into Mandarin before he was elected bishop of Shanghai in 1877. Paralyzed by a stroke, he resigned his see in 1883 but over the next twenty years completed, with the help of his wife, a translation of the Bible into Wenli (classical Chinese), typing some 2,000 pages with the middle finger of his partially crippled hand. Four years before his death in 1906, he said, “I have sat in this chair for over twenty years. It seemed very hard at first. But God knew best. He kept me for the work for which I am best fitted.”

== Mission work in Liberia ==
Liberia, where the DFMS sent missionaries in 1835 and 1836. Revd. John Payne consecrated in 1851 as the first missionary bishop of Liberia. First African American missionary bishop, Samuel Ferguson<source? /wrong person linked>, was consecrated in 1884.

== Mission work in Japan ==
In Japan, was the third major area of 19th-century Episcopal mission. The Revd. John Liggins and the Revd. Channing Moore Williams who relocated from the China mission in 1859, were among the first non-Roman Christian missionaries in that country's history. Channing Moore Williams (commemorated on 2 December) was consecrated missionary bishop of China and Japan in 1866.

== See also ==
- Protestant missionary societies in China during the 19th Century
- Timeline of Chinese history
- 19th-century Protestant missions in China
- List of Protestant missionaries in China
- Christianity in China
