= William Jones Boone Sr. =

American bishop; first Bishop of Shanghai (1811–1874)

- Missionary Bishop of China and Japan
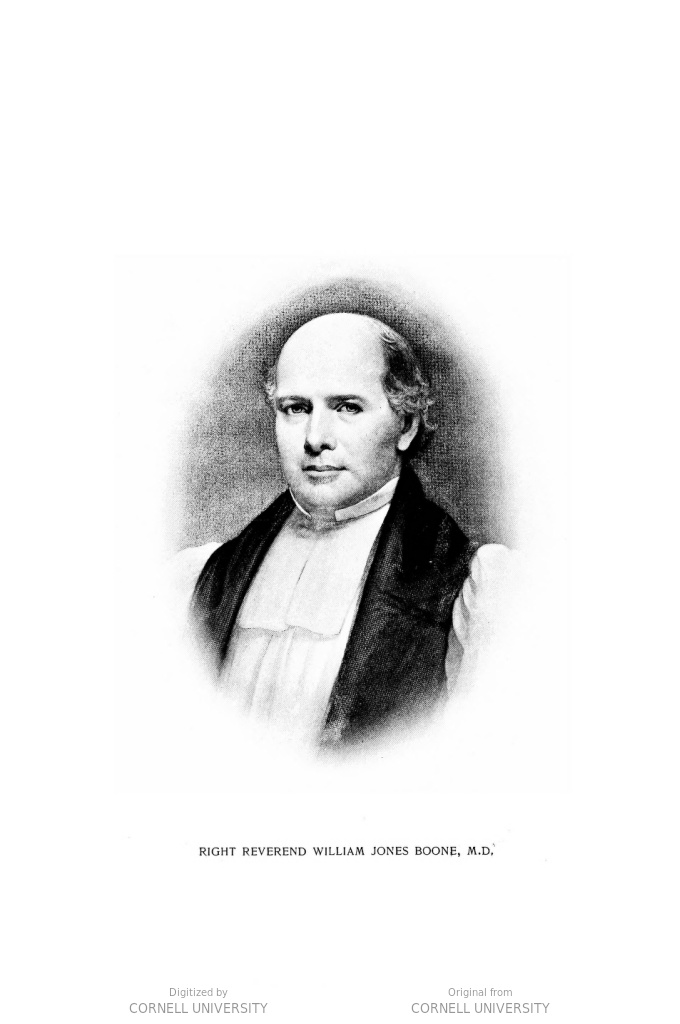
- Church: Episcopal Church
- See: China and Japan (missionary district)
- In office: 1844-1864
- Predecessor: none
- Successor: Channing M. Williams

Orders
- Ordination: 3 March 1837

Personal details
- Born: 1 July 1811 Walterboro, South Carolina, US
- Died: 17 July 1864 (aged 53) Shanghai

William Jones Boone Sr. (1 July 1811 – 17 July 1864) was the first Episcopalian missionary bishop of China and Japan and the first bishop of China outside the Roman tradition.

== Life ==
Boone was born in Walterboro, South Carolina, graduated from the College of South Carolina in 1829 and was admitted to the bar in 1833. He then attended Virginia Theological Seminary and was ordained deacon on 18 September 1836 and priest on 3 March 1837.

== Missionary work in China ==
Under the auspices of the Protestant Episcopal Church Mission (PECM, also called the American Church Mission), Boone was appointed a missionary to China on 17 January 1837. Accompanied by his wife Amelia he commenced his journey to China from Boston on 8 July 1837 reaching Batavia on 22 October the same year. In Batavia he studied alongside the priests Henry Lockwood and Francis Hanson to gain a degree of fluency in the Chinese language.

Prior to the conclusion of the First Opium War Boone relocated to Macau in 1840. In February 1842 conditions in China were considered secure enough for Boone to relocate his missionary work to Kulangsu, a small island half a mile from the recently opened treaty port of Amoy, to set up the first base for the Episcopalians.

On a return visit the United States Boone was consecrated at St. Peter's Church, Philadelphia on 26 October 1844 as the first Anglican missionary bishop of China and Japan (under later bishops, the missionary district was reduced and called Shanghai) and the first bishop of China outside the Roman tradition. Influenced by British CMS missionary George Smith he chose to relocate the center of his mission work to Shanghai in 1845 where he served until his death in 1864.

Boone was responsible for the recruitment of numerous missionaries; notably Emma Jones, Henry M. Parker and Channing Moore Williams his eventual successor as Bishop of China and Japan. Boone with others is credited with the translation of the Book of Common Prayer into Chinese and also contributed to a Chinese translation of the Bible. He also ordained the first Chinese priest, Huang Guangcai (Chinese: 黃光彩, 1827–96) in 1851.

Between 1848 and 1850, Boone was a central figure in the "Term Question" debate on how to translate the word "God" into Chinese for the Delegates Version Bible. He advocated using the word shen 神, in opposition to figures like James Legge who favoured using Shangdi 上帝.

== Family ==
He married Sarah Amelia deSaussure who died at Amoy in 1842. His second wife was Phobe Caroline Elliott. Boone's son, also named William Jones Boone, also served as a Missionary Bishop of Shanghai in the Episcopal Church.

=== Consecrators ===
- Philander Chase, 1st bishop of Ohio and 1st bishop of Illinois
- George Washington Doane, 2nd bishop of New Jersey
- James Hervey Otey, 1st bishop of Tennessee

William Jones Boone was the 45th bishop consecrated for the Episcopal Church.

== Works ==
- (1837) Address in Behalf of the China Mission, By the Rev. William J. Boone, M.D., Missionary of the Protestant Episcopal Church of the United States of America to China.
- (1848) An Essay on the Proper Rendering of the Words Elohim and Theos into the Chinese Language. Canton [Guangzhou]: Office of the Chinese Repository.
- (1850) Defense of an essay on the proper rendering of the words Elohim and Theos into the Chinese language. Canton [Guangzhou]: Office of the Chinese Repository.
- (1852) A vindication of comments on the translation of Ephesians I : in the Delegates' version of the New Testament. Canton [Guangzhou]. Publisher not indicated - presumably Office of the Chinese Repository.

== See also ==
- Huachung University – originally called Boone University, named after W. J. Boone.

Episcopal Church (USA) titles
New title	Missionary Bishop of China and Japan; 1844–1864	Succeeded by Channing Moore Williams
