= William Jones Boone Jr. =

American Anglican missionary

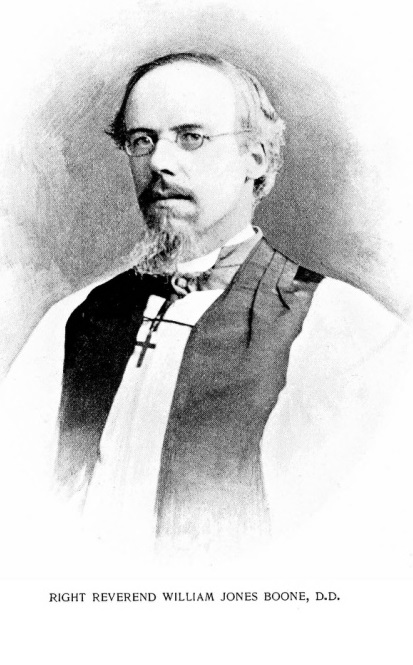
The Rt. Rev. William Jones Boone

William Jones Boone Jr. (17 May 1846 – 5 October 1891) was the fourth Anglican missionary bishop of Shanghai. Boone was born in Shanghai, son of and namesake of William Jones Boone and his wife Sarah Amelia De Saussure Boone. After his mother's death, he and his brother were taken to the US for their education.

He studied at Princeton University and attended Virginia Theological Seminary prior to his ordination to the diaconate in Petersburg, Virginia in 1868. The Foreign Missions Committee appointed him as a missionary to China in 1869. He was consecrated Bishop of Shanghai on 28 October 1884.

Boone served in Wuchang before retiring to America with ill-health; however, he later decided to return to China to continue his work in Hankow.

He married Mary Carolina De Saussure Boone and after her death in 1875, he married Henrietta F. Harris Boone. He had three children.

He died of typhoid in 1891.

== Works ==
- Correspondence in Connection with the Protest against the Consecration of Rev. W. J. Boone as Missionary Bishop of the Protestant Episcopal Church in China. Also Letters Referring to the Wretched Management of the Mission (1885)

== See also ==
- Protestant missions in China 1807-1953
