= James Pong =

Former Bishop Emeritus of Taiwan

James Tak-Ming Pong Bishop Emeritus of Taiwan
- The Right Reverend
- Native name: 龐德明
- Diocese: Episcopal Diocese of Taiwan
- In office: 1971–1979
- Predecessor: James C. L. Wong
- Successor: Pui-Yeung Cheung

Personal details
- Born: Pong Tak-Ming; September 19, 1911
- Died: October 16, 1988 (aged 77)

James Tak-Ming Pong (Chinese: 龐德明; September 19, 1911 – October 16, 1988), also called James Te-Ming Pong, was a Hong Kong Episcopalian bishop who served as the fourth bishop, and second bishop of Chinese descent, of the Episcopal Diocese of Taiwan.

Pong was born in Hong Kong, where his father was a compradore for Jardine and Blue Funnel Line ships and his mother was a shopkeeper. At a young age, Pong moved with his family to his father's hometown in Beihai, where he resided from 1916 to 1920. His family later returned to Hong Kong, where he attended St. Paul's College. He went on to attend St. John's University in Shanghai, majoring in History and Government. Upon graduating, he accepted a teaching position at Lingnan Middle School in Canton (starting in 1935) and Lingnan University (starting in 1942) as an Instructor and later assistant professor in History and Government. In 1947, he won a fellowship given by the Associated Board for Christian Colleges in China (known as the United Board for Christian Higher Education in Asia since 1951), which enabled him to earn an MA degree in Political Science from the University of Chicago in 1949.

On Trinity Sunday 1952 (June 8), Pong was ordained priest at York Minster, England, by Cyril Garbett, Archbishop of York — likely the first Chinese person to be ordained there. However, upon his return to Hong Kong in 1953, he was seconded to be the Dean at Chung Chi College (later to become part of the Chinese University of Hong Kong). From 1957 until 1970, he served in the Diocese of Hong Kong and Macau in various positions, including Vicar of St James's Church in Wan Chai and Vicar of St Paul's Church in Glenealy. He spent a sabbatical year studying at Oxford University in 1963. From 1964 to 1969, he was concurrently the Anglican Regional Officer for South-East Asia.

Pong was consecrated as Bishop of Taiwan on January 6, 1971, a position he held until 1979. He was also Acting President of St John's and St Mary's Institute of Technology at Tamshui from 1972 to 1975. After returning to Hong Kong, he served as Rector of the Tao Fong Shan Christian Centre from 1980 to 1982.

His remains are interred at the Chinese Christian Cemetery in Hong Kong alongside his wife Lily Yun Yu (née Yeung, 1911–2014). On November 30, 2015, the Taiwan Episcopal Church dedicated the Bishop James T.M. Pong Memorial Conference Room in the Diocese of Taiwan office in Taipei.

== See also ==
- Lists of popes, patriarchs, primates, archbishops, and bishops
- List of bishops of the Episcopal Church in the United States of America

== Sources ==
- Pong, James T.M. (1977) Worldly Ambition versus Christian Vocation. Autobiography of a Chinese Bishop. Diocesan Press. Taiwan Episcopal Church. Taipei, Taiwan.
- Chinese-language biography
- "Te Ming Pong Elected Second Bishop of Taiwan". Archives of The Episcopal Church. October 5, 1970. Archived from the original on March 4, 2016.
