= St. John's Episcopal Cathedral, Taipei =

Church in Da'an, Taipei, Taiwan

St. John's Episcopal Cathedral
- 聖約翰座堂
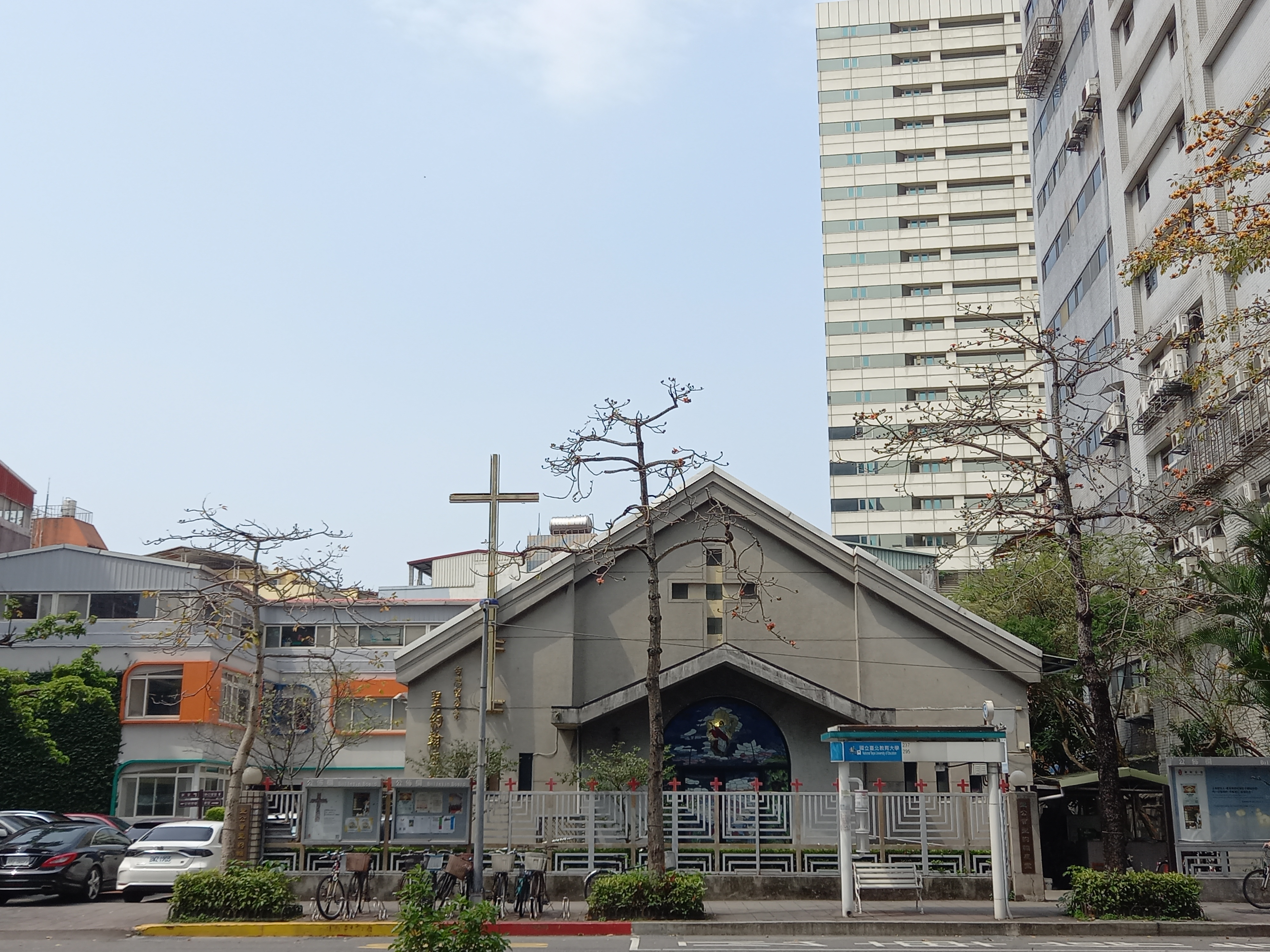
- St. John's Episcopal Cathedral
- 25°01′28.0″N 121°32′35.3″E
- Location: Da'an, Taipei
- Country: Taiwan
- Denomination: Episcopal
- Website: stjohn.episcopalchurch.org.tw

History
- Dedication: St John the Evangelist

Architecture
- Completed: 1955

Administration
- Province: Province VIII
- Diocese: Taiwan

Clergy
- Bishop: The Rt Revd Lennon Chang Yuan-rong
- Dean: The Very Revd Philip Lin Li-feng

St. John's Episcopal Cathedral (Chinese: 聖約翰座堂; pinyin: Shèngyuēhàn Zuòtáng; Wade–Giles: Shêng⁴-yüeh¹-han⁴ tso⁴-tʽang²) is the cathedral of the Episcopal Diocese of Taiwan, a diocese of the Episcopal Church of the United States, which is part of the worldwide Anglican Communion. The cathedral church is located at No. 280, Second Section, Fuhsing South Road, Da'an District, Taipei, Taiwan.

== History ==
A large building in southern Taipei, it was built in 1955 by Chinese Anglicans who had fled mainland China in 1949 after the Chinese Communist Revolution. Formerly, the church and Taiwan were under the jurisdiction of Nippon Sei Ko Kai of Japan but the Diocese would be transferred to the American Episcopal Church gradually from 1954 to 1960. It was consecrated in 1956 by the Bishop of Hawaii, Harry S. Kennedy. Bishop Kennedy would make annual visits to Taiwan until 1958 when Charles P. Gilsen was appointed as Suffragan Bishop of Honolulu and would become resident in Taiwan with St. John's as his pro-cathedral.

The church was elevated to a cathedral when the Missionary Diocese of Taiwan was established in 1961–1962. The annex was added in 1963. In 1965, the new Diocese received James C. L. Wong as its first bishop and in 1988, when the Missionary Diocese was elevated to the status of full Diocese, John C. T. Chien was appointed as the first native Taiwanese bishop in the Cathedral. In the 1990s, the Cathedral had a series of new stained glass windows installed, following a parishoner's suggestion after he had been inspired by historic churches in Europe and the Americas.

== Clergy ==
Incumbent clergy:

Clerical position	Name
Bishop of the Diocese of Taiwan	The Right Revd Lennon Chang Yuan-rong
Dean	The Very Revd Philip Lin Li-feng
Chaplains Ministries	The Revd Alex Tso Hsin-tai Deacon
Chaplains Ministries	The Revd Claire Wang Chia-lin English Congregation

== Transportation ==
The cathedral is south of Technology Building Station of Taipei Metro, within walking distance.

== See also ==
- St John's Cathedral (Hong Kong)
