= Rosalyn Koo =

Chinese-American philanthropist (1926–2021)

- Born: Rosalyn Chin-Ming Chen; November 11, 1926; Shanghai, China
- Died: January 30, 2021 (aged 94); San Mateo, California, U.S.
- Other name: Rosalyn Chin-Ming Koo
- Education: UC Berkeley
- Occupations: Architectural firm manager and philanthropist
- Years active: 1973–2021
- Title: Executive Vice President of MBT Associates
- Spouse: Karlson Koo (m. 1950; died 2000)

Rosalyn Chin-Ming Koo (née Chen; Chinese: 顾陈晋明; November 11, 1926 – January 30, 2021) was a Chinese-American philanthropist. She served as Executive Vice President of MBT Associates, an architectural firm listed in the 1980s as one of the 500 fastest-growing private companies in America, for 30 years. After her retirement, Koo turned to philanthropy and social activism. She has served in non-profits that assist senior citizens, such as Self-Help for the Elderly, in California, and those which assist girls trying to attain an education in China, through such organizations as The 1990 Institute and the All-China Women's Federation. Koo has been the recipient of numerous honors and was inducted into the Women's Hall of Fame in 2007.

== Biography ==
Rosalyn Chin-Ming Chen was born in 1926 in Shanghai, China. After completing her studies at McTyeire School, Chen moved to the United States in 1947 to attend Mills College. She transferred to UC Berkeley and earned a degree in economics in 1953. By 1957, when she attained her permanent residency, Chen was married.

In 1958, Koo joined the architectural firm MBT Associates in the San Francisco Bay area, which had been founded in 1954. She served as Chief Financial Officer and was the only principal of the firm who was not an architect. The firm specialized in building commercial and university research and laboratory projects.

In 1983, the firm was listed as one of the 500 fastest growing firms in the US by Inc. Magazine in spite of an overall industry downward trend of nearly 33% according to the American Institute of Architects. Among the many clients served were Allergan, Genentech, Merck, Stanford University, UC-San Diego, UC San Francisco, the University of Virginia, and the University of Washington with numerous award-winning projects, like the Beckman Center for Molecular & Genetic Medicine at Stanford University, the Genencor International Technology Center in Palo Alto, California, and the Technical Headquarters Lab Building E of Chevron Research Company in Richmond, California. After 30 years at MBT, Koo retired in 1988.

In 1978, Koo returned to China for the first time and made contact with a former principal at her alma mater, then known as Shanghai Public High School No. 3. Koo committed that overseas investors would be found if the principal could convince the government to return the school to an all-girls facility. By 1984, the school had been restored to a girls school and an overseas alumni association was providing funding for new science laboratories. She soon joined her efforts with financing programs offered by The 1990 Institute and pledged to help 1,000 girls finish primary school.

In 2000, Koo toured western China visiting the provinces of Gansu, Shanxi and Shaanxi. Upon her return, she and Institute partners began a Dragon Fund to help educate girls in western China. The initial three projects were a Women's and Children's Training Center in Gansu, a greenhouse in Zhang Xian, and the "Spring Bud" scholarship program to provide funds for elementary school of girls in Shaanxi Province. Koo returned each year to measure the girls' progress and soon extended the scholarship funds to secondary schooling.

In 2008, after the earthquake in Sichuan Province, Koo extended her commitment to including girls in Sichuan Province as well. Since their school buildings had been destroyed, Koo partnered with Jennifer Devlin of EHDD in San Francisco, to build a seismically safe school to replace three which had been damaged by the quake. Working with local partners they built the school and provided input for new Chinese construction and seismic codes to ensure safety. As of 2012, with Koo's annual visit, she had assisted over 1000 girls in the Shaanxi province and 168 of them had gone on to university studies.

In 1986, she joined the board of a San Francisco-based program called "Self Help for the Elderly" and assisted the organization with planning and financing strategies to expand their services. Primarily, the organization serves seniors of Asian heritage and provides language courses, meals, and services to help their clients maintain their independence and well-being.

In 2007, Koo was inducted into the Women's Hall of Fame for her contributions to sustainable living. By 2015 the organization had 12 activity centers and Koo was the chair of the organization. She was advocating for the City of San Mateo to develop a center for the 1000 senior citizens who would be affected by closure of their current facility. She died on January 30, 2021, in San Mateo, California, from kidney failure.

== Sources ==
- University of California, Berkeley (1953). The Ninetieth Commencement. Berkeley, California: University of California.
- Wheeler, Norton (2012). The Role of American NGOs in China's Modernization: Invited Influence. New York, New York: Routledge. ISBN 978-0-415-50657-1.
