= Li Yuin Tsao =

Chinese physician

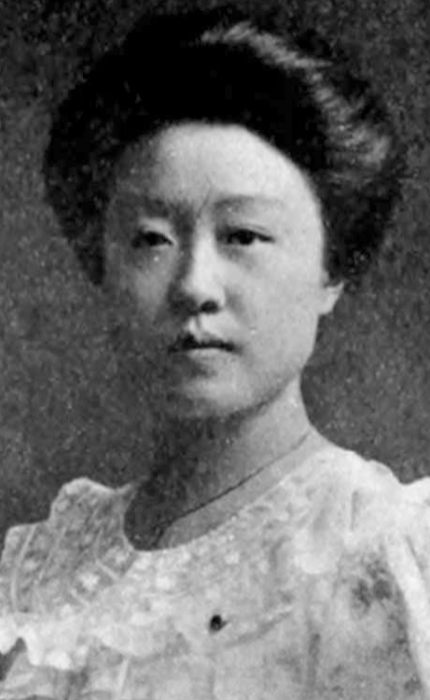
- Li Yuin Tsao in the 1911 yearbook of the Woman's Medical College of Pennsylvania.
- Born: 1886; Suzhou
- Died: August 14, 1922 (aged 35–36); Tianjin
- Occupation: Physician

Li Yuin Tsao (1886 – August 14, 1922), also seen as Tsao Liyuin, was a Chinese medical doctor.

== Early life ==
Tsao was from Suzhou, the daughter of Tse-Zeh Tsao (Cao Zishi, 1847-1902), a Methodist minister who was partly educated in the United States. She attended the McTyeire School in Shanghai and a missionary girls' school in Nagasaki.

Tsao was a teacher before she received a scholarship from medical missionary Mary Hancock McLean to attend college in the United States in 1905. After two years of preparation at a women's college in St. Louis, she was a medical student at the Woman's Medical College of Pennsylvania, where she was vice-president of the class of 1911. In 1908, she attended the Conference of Chinese Students in Boston, and heard Wu Tingfang speak.

Her sister Faung (Fanny) Yuin Tsao attended Wellesley College and Teachers College, Columbia University; one of her brothers attended Yale University.

== Career ==
Tsao was an intern under Bertha Van Hoosen at Chicago's Mary Thompson Hospital, and her success there opened the door to other Chinese and Chinese-American women physicians, including Margaret Chung.

Tsao returned to China after internships in Chicago and St. Louis, then in 1912 took an appointment at a Quaker-sponsored hospital in Nanjing, where she remained until 1918. While in Nanjing, she was also involved with the Union Training School for Nurses, taught at Ginling College for Women, and gave public lectures on health topics. She moved to Tianjin to work at the Peiyang Woman's Hospital. While there, she was active in the city's YWCA program, as president of its board of directors.

Me-Iung Ting was Tsao's assistant and successor at Nanjing, and they worked together again at Peiyang Woman's Hospital.

== Personal life ==
After Li Yuin Tsao's death in 1922, from a cerebral hemorrhage. Mary Hancock McLean wrote a short biography, Dr. Li Yuin Tsao: Called and Chosen and Faithful (1925).
