= Church of the Good Shepherd (Taipei) =

Church in Shilin, Taipei, Taiwan

Coordinates: 25°05′28.0″N 121°31′03″E

- Episcopal Church of the Good Shepherd
- 聖公會牧愛堂
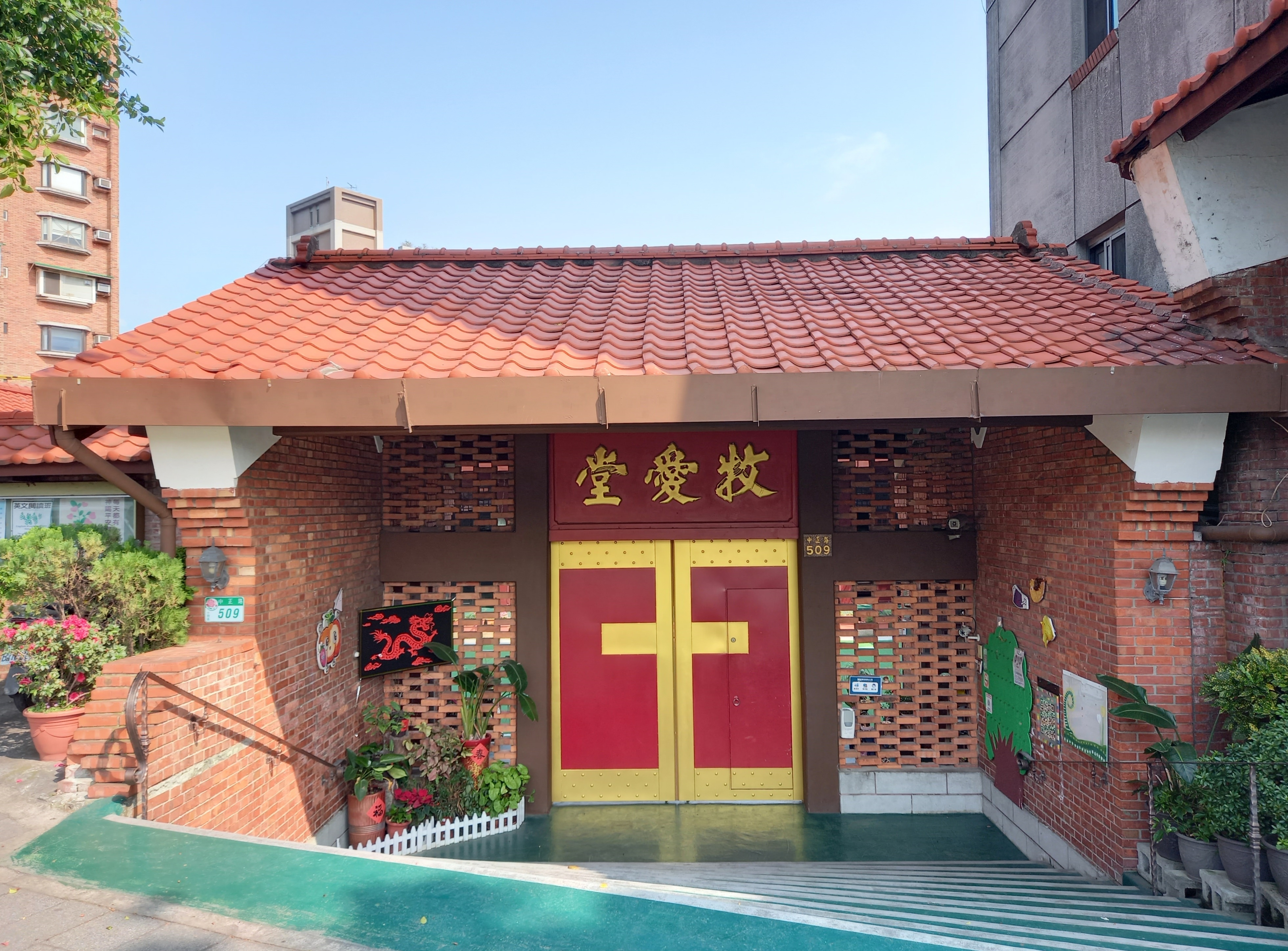
- Church of the Good Shepherd
- Location: Shilin, Taipei
- Country: Taiwan
- Denomination: Episcopal

Architecture
- Style: Hokkien architecture
- Completed: 1966

Administration
- Province: Province VIII
- Diocese: Taiwan

Clergy
- Rector: Ven. Keith Lee

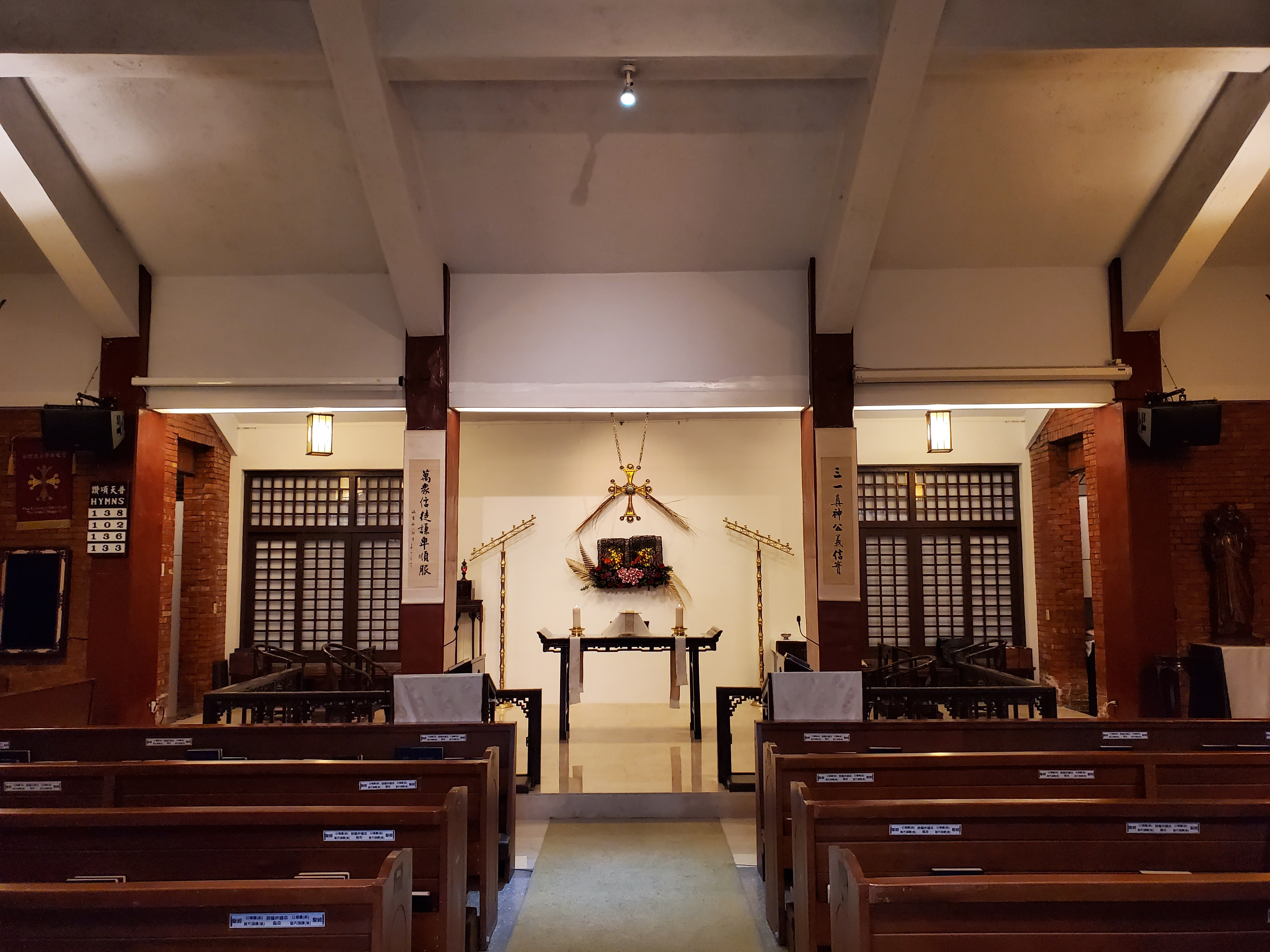
Church altar

The Church of the Good Shepherd (Chinese: 牧愛堂; pinyin: Mùàitáng; Wade–Giles: Mu^{4}-ai^{4} tʽang^{2}) is part of the Episcopal Diocese of Taiwan and is situated in Taipei, Taiwan. Good Shepherd grew from the migration of Chinese who came to Taiwan after World War II; at the Church's height there were sixteen congregations. It had key early support from American military chaplains who held worship services at different locations, including the Taiwan Theological College and Seminary on Yangmingshan. After more than a decade of sponsorship by the US military chaplaincy, the Church was formally founded in 1963 to serve the foreign community in the Taipei area. The first two pastors were Lt. Col. Robert E. Hammerquist and Major Richard S. Craig. The congregation is among the oldest English congregations in Taiwan.

After a series of relocations, in 1965, the Church of the Good Shepherd purchased a plot of land situated at its current premise in Shilin District in which worship services have been held since 1966. Currently the congregation is made of mostly Taiwanese people, but also with a wide mixture of other nationalities. The church is one of the very few Protestant congregations in Taiwan following the liturgical Protestant tradition with choir leading the Chinese services. The controversial historical first House of Bishops Meeting of the Episcopal Church in Asia partly took place in the church between the 17th and 23 September 2014.

== Community Outreach ==
The church also runs a historic kindergarten and a community center in its premises, which has received recognition in Taiwan for its practices. The Church's social services, with a focus on disabled and elderly care, are done in cooperation with the Taipei City Government. In 2004 Good Shepherd and the nearby Sinkong Hospital held a symposium on community social work they conduct for the elderly. The church also annually hosts the St Kitts and Nevis independence day celebration visited by high-ranking Taiwan government officials as well as the wider diplomatic community in Taipei. The remembrance activities related to the remembrance day for the World War II allied prisoners of war in Taiwan under Japanese rule are also coordinated with the church.

== Architecture ==
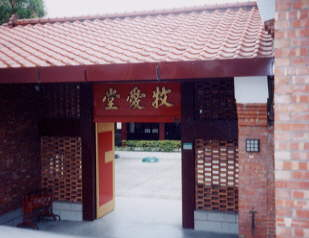
Entrance to the Church of Good Shepherd (1999)

The sanctuary and the adjoining traditional Chinese courtyard (siheyuan) was built following traditional Hokkien architecture and designed by Su Hsi Tsung. It is the only church in Taiwan built in this style. This style is extremely rare for church buildings in the world, even in Asian Church architecture. In this architectural style the main hall of the building, traditionally used as a family temple, is located opposite the entrance as is the sanctuary of the Church of the Good Shepherd. A Church of the East cross, as depicted on the Nestorian Stele, hanging above the altar. This reflects the aim of the church ever since its early days to contextualise the Christian faith into Chinese culture.

== Clergy ==
Clerical position	Name
Rector	The Ven. Keith Lee
Chaplains Ministries	Rev. Tom Reese, English Service
