= St. Luke's Church (Hualien) =

Church in Hualien City, Hualien County, Taiwan

Coordinates: 23.9847°N 121.6058°E

- 聖路加堂
- St. Luke's Church
- Location: Hualien County
- Country: Taiwan
- Denomination: Episcopal

History
- Dedication: St Luke the Evangelist

Architecture
- Completed: 1977

Administration
- Province: Province VIII
- Diocese: Taiwan

Clergy
- Bishop: The Rt Revd Lennon Chang Yuan-rong

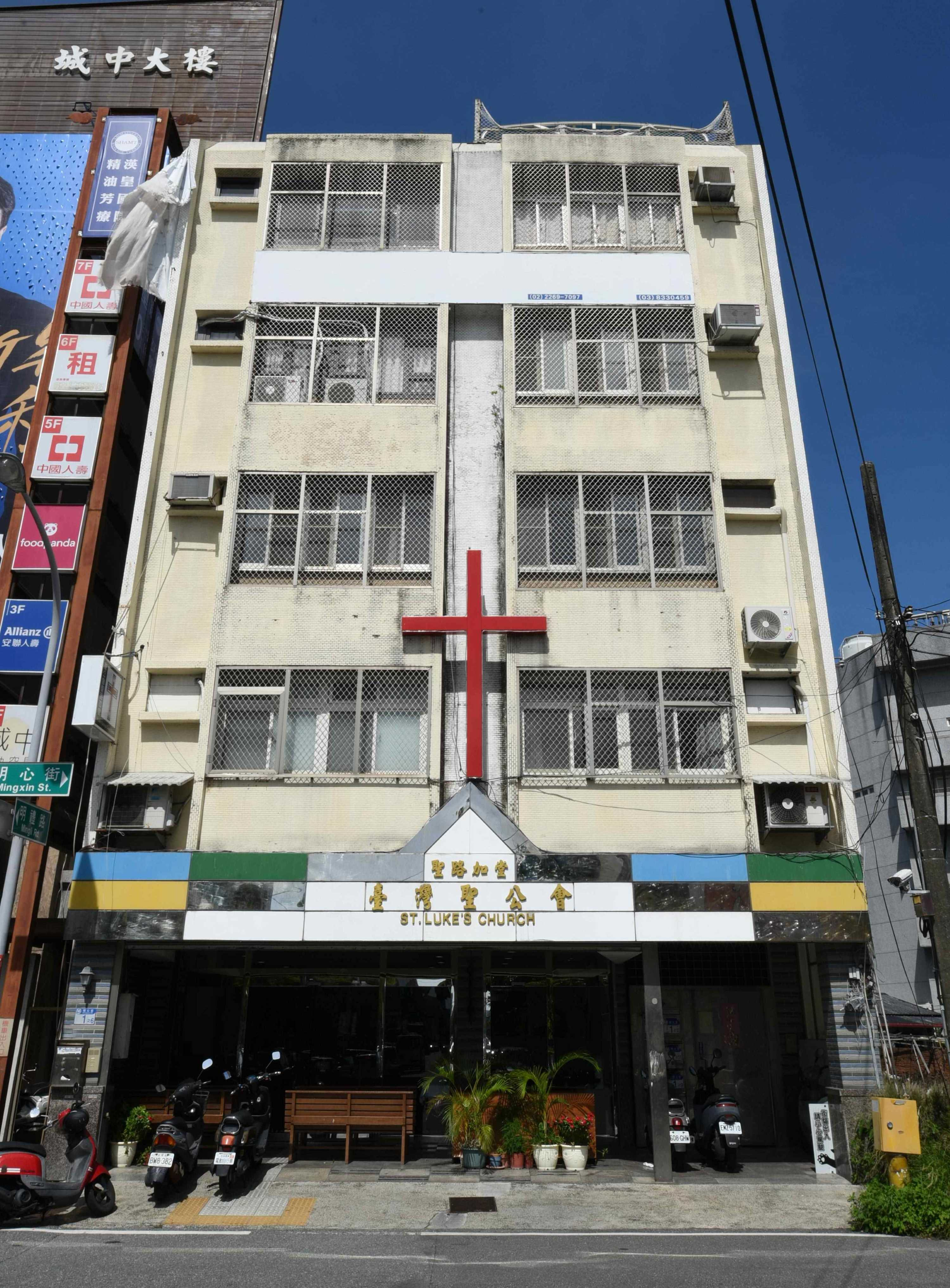
St. Luke's Church, Hualien, Taiwan

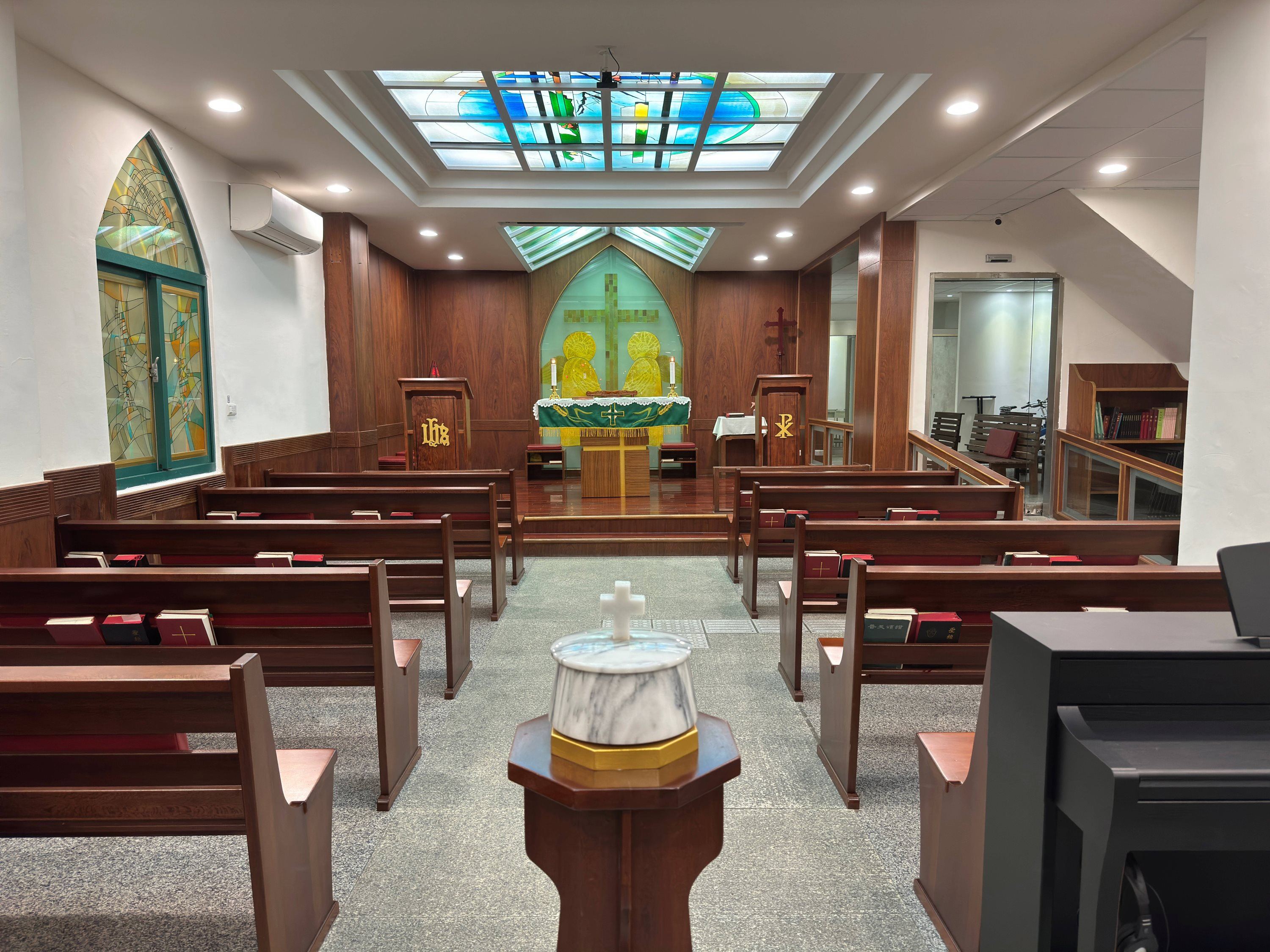
Inside St. Luke's Church, Hualien

St. Luke's Church, Hualien (Chinese: 花蓮聖路加堂), is a Protestant church located at No. 1-6, Ming Hsin Street, Hualien City, on the eastern coast of Taiwan. It belongs to the Taiwan Episcopal Church.

== History ==
St. Luke's Church originally started in a rented house in Fujian Street, Hualien City, and was consecrated on St. Andrew's Day, November 30, 1977, by Bishop T.M. Pang (龐德明主教), the second Bishop of the Taiwan Episcopal Church.

In November 1981, the new church building was completed at No. 1-6 Ming Hsin Street, with its consecration ceremony held. During the 1990s, it also used to hold an English-language service for the Filipino workers in the nearby Taroko Valley quarry.

In February 1999, when Rev. Chen Hong-Hsing (陳宏行) came to the church for the second time as pastor, he moved the chapel from the third floor to the first floor, and made the entrance glass-walled so that people could easily enter from the street. The altar was changed to colored glass to create a cross of resurrection, and the ceiling was also made of colored glass to create a modern and bright interior. Also, the vestry was changed to become a multimedia control room, and the projection screen could be lowered electrically.

The Hualien area is frequently hit by earthquakes, but the Hualien earthquake in February 2018 in particular caused severe human and material damage, and the church helped with relief efforts. The church itself also suffered damage to its altar, which was soon repaired.

Since July 2022, Rev. Antony Fan-Wei Liang (梁凡偉) has served here as pastor. In May 2023, the Annual Convention of the Taiwan Episcopal Church was held at this church.

== Transportation ==
From the east exit of Hualien railway station of Taiwan Railway's North-link and Tatung lines, it takes about ten minutes to reach St. Luke's Church for a distance of one kilometrtes. From Hualien Airport, it takes about 40 minutes by taxi.

== See also ==
- Christianity in Taiwan
- Hualien City
- Hualien County
