= Kathy Fang =

Asian American restaurateur and chef

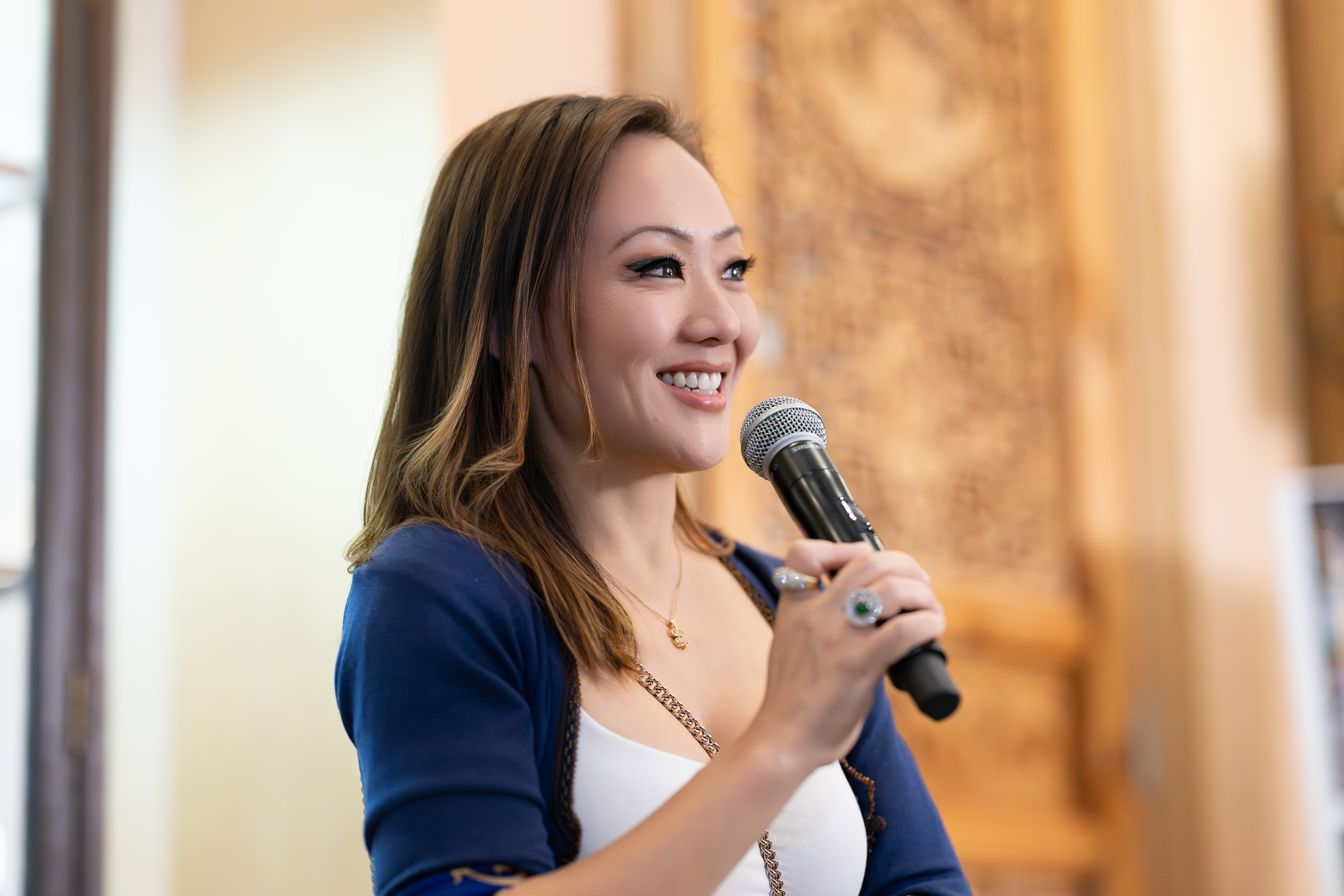
- Born: San Francisco, California
- Education: University of Southern California; Le Cordon Bleu
- Occupations: Chef; restauratuer; television personality; author
- Television: Chef Dynasty: House of Fang
- Awards: 2026 James Beard media award nomination for House of Nanking cookbook
- Website: kathyfang.com

Kathy Fang is an Asian American chef, restaurateur, and television personality. The subject of the Food Network docuseries Chef Dynasty: House of Fang, she is the executive chef and co-owner of the San Francisco restaurants FANG and House of Nanking; a James Beard Foundation media award nominee; and the author of House of Nanking: Family Recipes from San Francisco's Favorite Chinese Restaurant, a 2025 cookbook she wrote with her father, chef Peter Fang.

== Early life and education ==
Kathy Fang was born in San Francisco to Lily and Peter Fang, who emigrated from Shanghai to the US in 1980. They opened their own restaurant, House of Nanking, in 1988. Kathy Fang spent most of the time she wasn't in school at the restaurant, and learned to cook by watching her father and tasting his dishes. On weekends, after House of Nanking closed, her parents introduced her to a variety of cuisines at late night restaurants in North Beach. She created her own recipes when she was a child.

Peter Fang said the restaurant was mostly empty when House of Nanking opened. In February 1989, a rave review appeared in the San Francisco Chronicle, and "literally overnight" it became popular, with "lines out the door of people waiting get in." Despite its success, Fang's parents discouraged her from becoming a restaurateur; in a NPR interview, she said: "My parents knew it was a very tough life, and they came here to give me better opportunities." In 2000, she left San Francisco to attend the University of Southern California in Los Angeles. She graduated with a degree in businiess.

== Career ==
=== House of Nanking, FANG ===
Following her graduation, Fang worked briefly at Merrill Lynch and Johnson & Johnson. Finding the work boring, she spent a year in culinary training at Le Cordon Bleu, and returned to San Francisco and House of Nanking,where she developed recipes that incorporated San Francisco culture and her real-life experiences. In a United Shades of America column on CNN.com, W. Kamau Bell wrote: "Chef Peter Fang and his daughter Chef Kathy Fang turn those dishes you know into edible art."

In 2009, she partnered with her father to open a second restaurant, FANG, in San Francisco's SoMa neighborhood. The menu blended traditional Chinese cooking with other cuisines, seasonal ingredients, and contemporary cooking techniques to create dishes such as Japanese pumpkin eggrolls with caramel sauce. Patty Unterman reviewed FANG for the San Francisco Examiner in 2010. She wrote: "If you are open to lively, very personal creations that riff on the flavors and techniques from this area, you will discover many addictive dishes".

=== Chef Dynasty: House of Fang, Chopped ===
Fang has won Chopped twice. Her first win was for a Chinese New Year- themed episode in 2016. Chef Dynasty: House of Fang, a six-episode docuseries, debuted on Food Network in November 2022. Filmed over six weeks in the summer of that year, the series followed Kathy and Peter Fang as they addressed differences over the direction of the business.

=== Easy Asian Cookbook, House of Nanking: Family Recipes from San Francisco's Favorite Chinese Restaurant ===
In 2020, Fang's first book, Easy Asian Cookbook: 100+ Takeout Favorites Made Simple, was published. She wrote the 2025 cookbook House of Nanking: Family Recipes from San Francisco's Favorite Chinese Restaurant with her father. It includes three generations of family recipes. It was nominated for a James Beard Media Award and named a best cookbook of the year in New York, Eater, and Chowhound.

== In popular culture ==
In high school, Fang met Keanu Reeves while he was waiting in line at House of Nanking and took a photo with him. They recreated the photo when Reeves returned to House of Nanking to film a scene for The Matrix Resurrections twenty years later. The original photo was kept in the shot as an easter egg. During filming, Fang fired the same plate of yang chung noodles 20 times to keep it steaming hot.

== Personal life ==
Fang and her husband, a cybersecurity entrepreneur, live in San Francisco. They have two children.She is an advocate for Asian American community involvement, local businesses, and greater Asian representation in politics and food media; the cast of Chef Dynasty: House of Fang were all Asian. In 2017, she received the Ignite Award from the Asian American advocacy group The 1990 Institute.

== Selected awards and recognition ==
- Ignite Award, The 1990 Institute (2017)
- Breakout Foodie of the Year, TASTE Awards (2023)
- San Franciscans of the Year, San Francisco Examiner (2024)
- James Beard Foundation Media Award nomination for House of Nanking: Family Recipes from San Francisco's Favorite Chinese Restaurant (2026)

== Bibliography ==
- Kathy Fang, Peter Fang; House of Nanking: Family Recipes; September 30, 2025; Harry Abrams; 304 pp; ISBN 978-1419777875, 1419777874
- Kathy Fang; Easy Asian Cookbook: 100+ Takeout Favorites Made Simple; June 30, 2020; Callisto; 186 pp; ISBN 978-1646116706, 1646116704
