= Pui-Yeung Cheung =

Bishop of the Episcopal Diocese of Taiwan

- Traditional Chinese: 張培揚
- Simplified Chinese: 张培扬
Transcriptions
Standard Mandarin
- Hanyu Pinyin: Zhāng Péiyáng
- Wade–Giles: Chang1 P'ei2-yang2
Yue: Cantonese
- Jyutping: zoeng1 pui4 joeng4

Pui-Yeung Cheung, also known as Chang Pui Yeung or P.Y. Chang (Chinese: 張培揚; November 5, 1919 – September 6, 1987) was a Chinese Episcopalian bishop was served as Bishop of Taiwan (diocesan bishop of the Episcopal Diocese of Taiwan) from 1969 to 1977.

He was born in Guangdong, Republic of China.

An alumnus of Ming Hua Theological College, he was made deacon in May 1966 and ordained priest the following year (by James C. L. Wong, Bishop of Taiwan); and consecrated a bishop on January 6, 1980 (with John Allin, Presiding Bishop as chief consecrator, at St John's Cathedral, Taipei).
