= Laura Askew Haygood =

American educator & missionary (1845–1900)

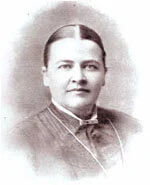
- Haygood in an undated photograph
- Born: October 14, 1845; Watkinsville, Georgia, United States
- Died: April 29, 1900 (aged 54); Shanghai, China
- Resting place: Bubbling Well Road Cemetery
- Education: Wesleyan College
- Occupations: Educator, missionary
- Relatives: Atticus Greene Haygood (brother)

Laura Askew Haygood (October 14, 1845 – April 29, 1900) was an American educator and missionary from Georgia. A sister of Atticus Greene Haygood, she founded a school in Atlanta and served as a missionary in China.

== Early life ==
Haygood was born in Watkinsville, Georgia on October 14, 1845, to Greene Berry Haygood and Martha Ann Askew. She was the younger sister of Atticus Greene Haygood, who would later become a bishop in the Methodist Episcopal Church, South (MECS). In 1852, her family moved to Atlanta, where she was homeschooled by her mother. She would later enroll at Wesleyan College at the age of 16, graduating two years later with a Bachelor of Arts degree in 1864. Shortly thereafter, she opened her own high school for girls in Atlanta, which ultimately merged with Girls High School. Haygood served as the principal and an educator at Girls following its merger in 1877. In 1882, Haygood established the Trinity Home Mission to assist in training women to help the poor in Atlanta.

In 1884, Haygood was sent to China as a missionary by the Woman's Board of Missions of the MECS. While in Shanghai, she helped found the McTyeire School in 1892, which is now Shanghai No. 3 Girls' High School. Placed on medical furlough between 1894 and 1896, Haygood would afterwards return to China to serve as director of the Woman's Board.

== Death and legacy ==
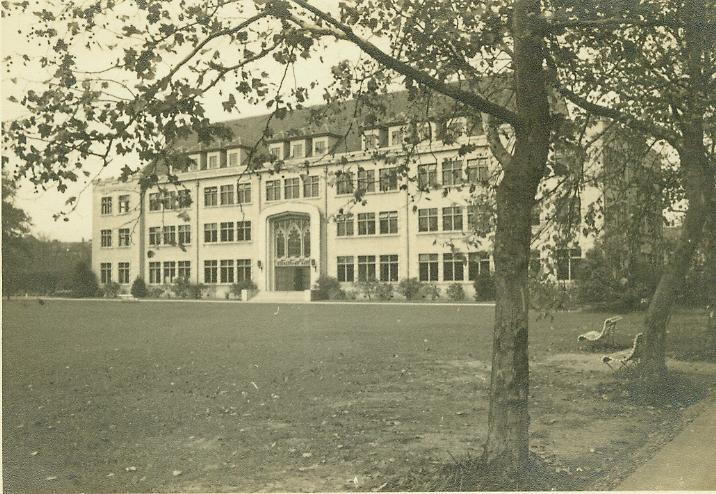
McTyeire School

Haygood died on April 29, 1900, while on mission in Shanghai. She was buried at the Bubbling Well Road Cemetery in the Shanghai International Settlement.

In 1916, the Laura Haygood Normal School was established in Suzhou. In 1926, Haygood Memorial Methodist Church was established in Atlanta's Morningside neighborhood, named in honor of Laura and her brother. In 2000, she was inducted into the Georgia Women of Achievement.
