= Cecilia S. L. Zung =

Chinese lawyer

- 程修龄
- Born: 1903
- Other names: Hsiu-Ling Ch'eng, Zheng Xiuling, Cecilia S. L. Cheng
- Occupations: Lawyer, writer

Cecilia Sieu Ling Zung (程修龄; 1903 – after June 1978), also seen as Hsiu-Ling Ch'eng, Zheng Xiuling, and Cecilia S. L. Cheng, was a Chinese lawyer, interpreter, and writer.

== Early life and education ==
Zung was born in Shanghai, to wealthy parents. She attended the McTyeire School. She earned a law degree at Soochow University's law school in 1934. She pursued further education in the United States, where she earned a bachelor's degree at Barnard College in 1938, a master's degree at Columbia University in 1939, and a doctoral (JSD) degree at New York University in 1942, with a thesis titled "Belligerent interference with mails on neutral ships and aircraft".

== Career ==
Zung taught mathematics at her alma mater, the McTyeire School, for nine years. She was based in the United States from 1936 to 1946, working in various private and government positions, including for the Office of Strategic Services during World War II. Zung wrote a comedic play, Two Too Many (1939), and, with Peking opera artist Mei Lanfang, Secrets of the Chinese drama: A complete explanatory guide to actions and symbols as seen in the performance of Chinese dramas (1937, 1964). In 1942 she was a guest lecturer at Mills College, and spoke to a meeting of AAUW members in Sacramento, California, about "The Legal Status of Chinese Women, Old versus New". She gave a similar talk to a YWCA group in Southern California in 1943.

Zung returned to Shanghai in 1946 and resumed a law practice there. She was also a professor at Soochow University Law School. In 1948 and 1949 she served as a delegate to the United Nations Commission on the Status of Women. The Chinese Communist Revolution prevented her return to Shanghai in 1949, so she settled in New York City. She taught courses in government at Miami University in Ohio in 1950. She continued studying, teaching, writing, performing, and speaking in the United States, into the 1970s.

== Personal life ==
Zung inherited a significant estate as a young woman, and became a lawyer in part to protect her own inheritance. She was still traveling and active in summer 1978.
