= St. Mary's Hall, Shanghai =

Episcopal girls' school in Shanghai (1881–1952)

- Traditional Chinese: 聖瑪利亞女中
- Simplified Chinese: 圣玛利亚女中
Transcriptions
Standard Mandarin
- Hanyu Pinyin: Shèng Mǎlìyà Nǚzhōng
- Wade–Giles: Sheng Ma-li-ya Nü-chung

St. Mary's Hall (Chinese: 聖瑪利亞女中) was a Christian school that existed in Shanghai, China, established by the Episcopal Church of the United States.

== History ==
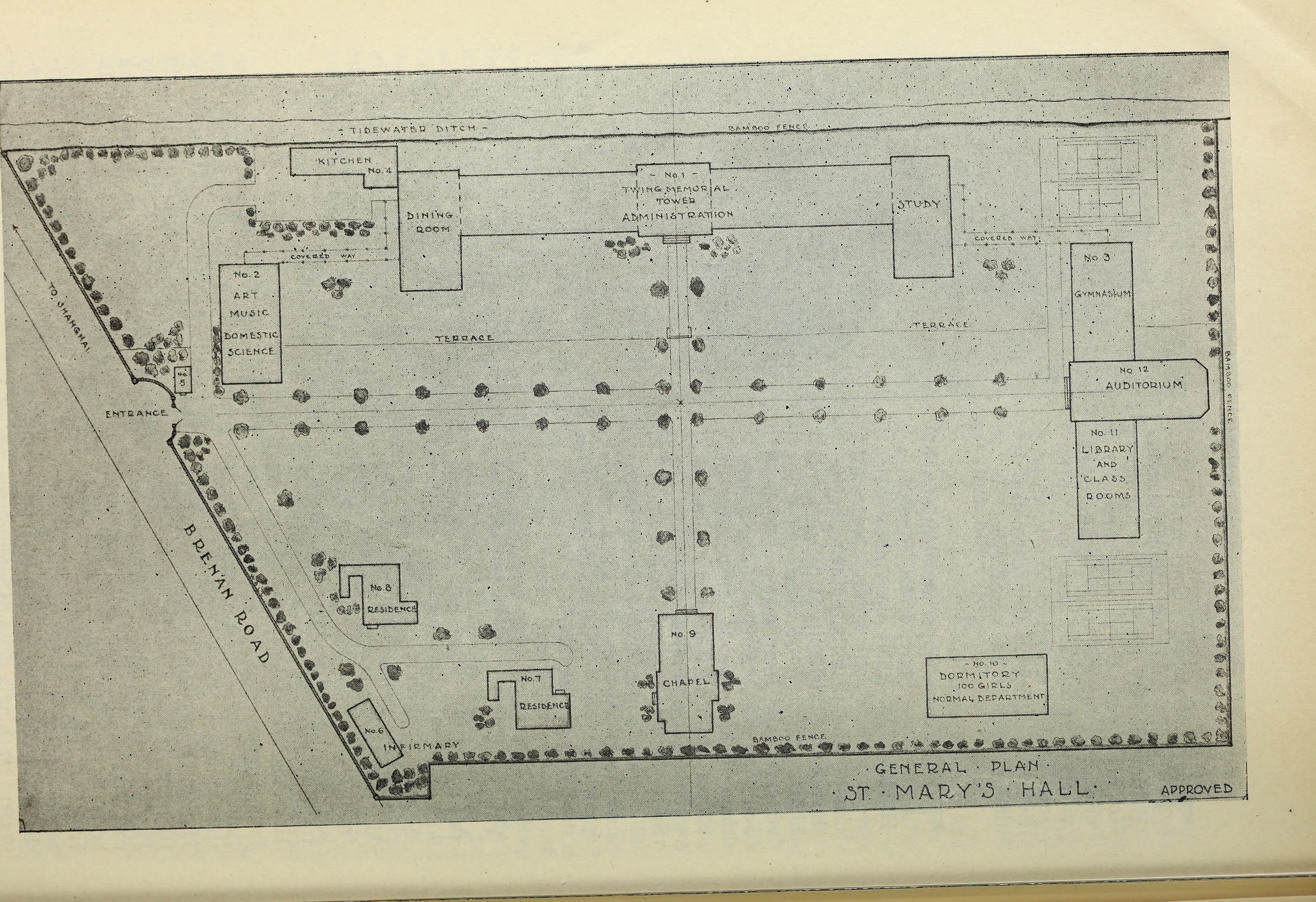
General Plan of St. Mary's Hall

The history of St. Mary's Hall, Shanghai goes back to a training school that was started in 1851 near the Episcopal Cathedral in Shanghai. This school was officially named as St. Mary's Hall in 1881 and was located next to St. John's College. In 1923, it moved to Brenan Road (currently No. 1187 Changning Road) of Shanghai International Settlement. Because of high tuition, St. Mary's and McTyeire School for Girls of the Methodist Church were called the "Christian Schools for Wealthy/Noble Maidens". English Literatures, Home Economics, and Music/Dancing subjects there were famous.

After the establishment of the People's Republic of China, St. Mary's Hall was merged with McTyeire School to become No. 3 Middle School of Shanghai City, located at No. 155 Jiangsu Road in 1952. The site of St. Mary's Hall was used by the Shanghai Spinning Industry College, and then, in 1999, became the Chang'an Branch of Donghua University's Spinning Industry Department.

As of 2020, the former school buildings of St. Mary's Hall have been preserved and renovated as part of a new commercial complex.

After the Kuomintang government moved to Taiwan, the alumni and other people related to St. Mary's Hall and St. John's University established a school which later became St. John's University (Taiwan).

== Noted alumna ==
- Eileen Chang
- Gong Peng

== See also ==
- St. John's University, Shanghai
- St. John's University (Taiwan)
- Chung Hua Sheng Kung Hui
- Episcopal Church of the United States
