= Pauline Woo Tsui =

Chinese American anti-discrimination activist (1920–2018)

Pauline Woo Tsui (October 2, 1920 – November 27, 2018) was a Chinese American anti-discrimination activist. As a co-founder of the Organization of Chinese American Women, she is considered a pioneer of Chinese women's rights in the United States.

== Early life and education ==
Pauline Woo was born in Nanjing, China, in 1920. Her father, John Yien-teh Woo, had been born in Hawaii, so she held dual U.S. citizenship. The influential educator Kuo Ping-Wen was her uncle.

At a time when many women were systematically denied an education, she insisted on the importance of schooling for girls. After attending the McTyeire School, a private girls' school in Shanghai, she obtained a bachelor's degree in education from St. John's University, Shanghai.

== Displacement and exile ==
During World War II, she was forced to flee the Japanese occupation, settling in Chongqing for three years. In Chongqing, she taught music at the Central Training Institute. After the war, she moved to the United States, which she had never visited despite being a citizen.

== Career in the United States ==
On arriving the United States, she studied at Columbia University in New York, graduating with a master's degree in music education in 1947. She had initially planned to open a group of schools back in Shanghai. When her plans in Shanghai fell through due to the Chinese Communist Revolution, she instead moved to Washington, D.C. There, she worked at the United States Army Map Service for 30 years, where she would eventually serve as Federal Women's Program manager. She also met and married Tswen-ling Tsui, a diplomat for the Republic of China, in 1947, and the couple had two children.

While working in government, Tsui experienced and observed the discrimination faced by women and minorities, including Chinese women. In addition to her work as her department's Federal Women's Program manager, she also co-founded a Federally Employed Women chapter. Additionally, she served as vice president of the Organization of Chinese Americans.

After a few years of organizing, Tsui co-founded the Organization of Chinese American Women in 1977, serving as its executive director from 1983 to 2007. The organization, which was also co-founded by the diplomat Julia Chang Bloch, aimed to offer education and training programs that would empower Chinese American women. It was initially affiliated with the Organization of Chinese Americans, but they eventually disaffiliated due to differing priorities.

== Later years, death, and legacy ==
In the early 1990s, after her husband's death, Tsui moved from Washington to Montgomery County, Maryland. In 2013, she co-wrote History of the Organization of Chinese American Women, which covers the first three decades of the organization's history, with Puanani Woo.

Tsui died in 2018. The following year, she was posthumously named as a member of the Maryland Women's Hall of Fame. In 2020, the Chinese American Museum launched an event series in her honor.
