= David Jung-Hsin Lai =

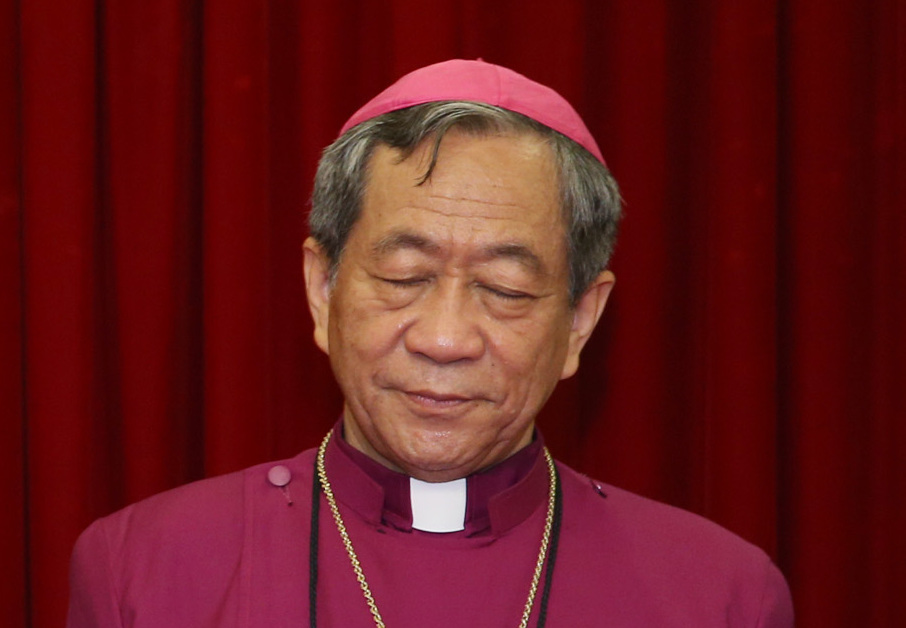
Bishop David Jung-Hsin Lai praying during a 2014 event.

David Jung-Hsin Lai (given name also romanized Rongxin; Chinese: 賴榮信; born 3 March 1948) is a retired Taiwanese Anglican bishop who served as Bishop of Taiwan, the diocesan bishop of the Episcopal Diocese of Taiwan (2001–2020). Lai was ordained to the diaconate on 23 March 1975, to the priesthood on 11 April 1976, and consecrated on 25 November 2000 at St Timothy's Church, Kaohsiung by Richard Sui On Chang, Bishop of Hawaii, to serve initially as coadjutor bishop. He retired in March 2020.
