= Zung Wei-tsung =

Chinese journalist

- 程婉珍
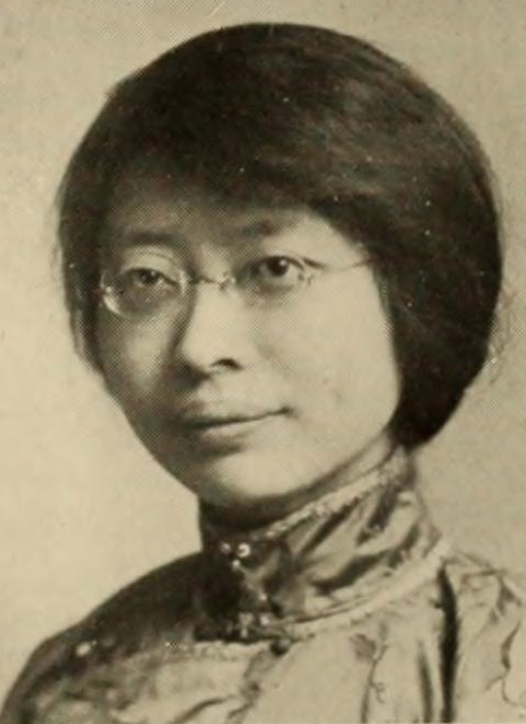
- Zung Wei-tsung, from the 1919 yearbook of Smith College
- Other names: Cheng Wanzhen
- Occupations: YWCA leader, educator, journalist

Zung Wei-tsung or Cheng Wanzhen (程婉珍), known after 1926 as Mrs. Chiu, was a Chinese social worker, educator, and journalist in the 1920s. She was interested in child labor and women workers, and involved in leadership of the YWCA at the international level.

== Early life and education ==
Zung Wei-tsung was from Shanghai. She attended the McTyeire School for Girls in Shanghai, and studied music at the North Carolina College for Women in Greensboro, where she is remembered as the college's "very first international student". She graduated from Smith College in 1919, with a degree in history. While in the United States, she was a member of the Chinese Students Christian Association in North America, and chaired the Association's committee on Bible study for women.

== Career ==
Zung was a leader of the YWCA in China and internationally in the 1920s. She worked with British YWCA leader Agatha Harrison. She was also active in the leadership of the National Christian Council of China. With the YWCA, she took particular interest in child labor regulation, and working conditions for women, in the face of rapid industrialization. She was founding president of the Shanghai Business Women's Club, wrote a column in a daily newspaper, and taught English at Pingmin Girls' School and the Laura Haygood Normal School in Suzhou. She helped to organize the Shanghai Suffrage Association in 1922.

In 1921, Zung represented Chinese women as a guest speaker at the Second International Congress of Working Women and the International Labor Conference, both held in Geneva. She also visited and toured factories in England for seven weeks, during that 1921 trip. "Although industrially China has made a bad beginning," she wrote in 1924, "she is still in the advantageous position of being able to learn from the West." She left the YWCA in 1926, for health and ideological reasons, and to marry W. Y. Chiu that year.
