= Holy Trinity Church (Keelung) =

Protestant church in Taiwan

Coordinates: 25.1276654°N 121.7577772°E

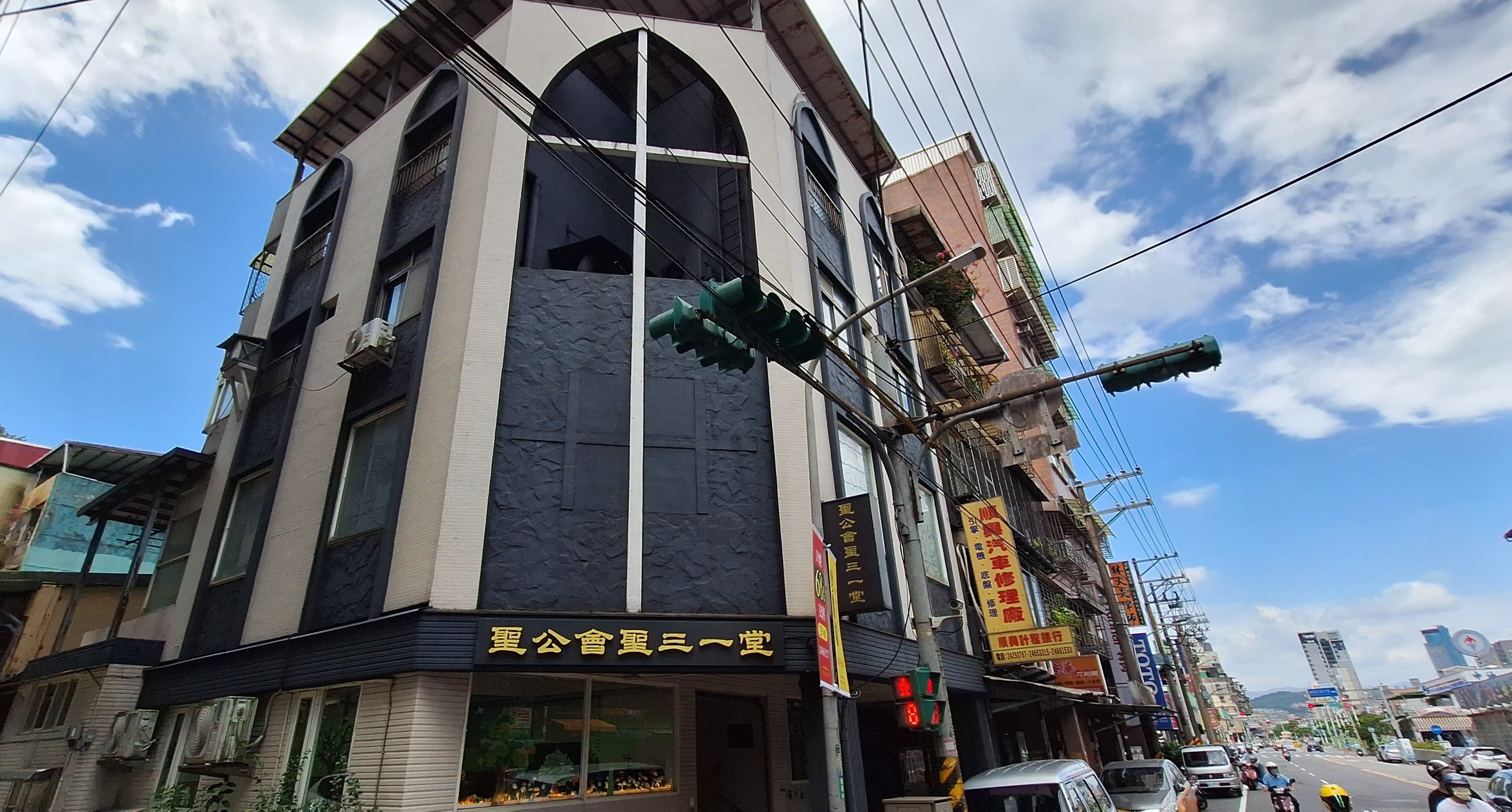
Outside the Holy Trinity Episcopal Church, Keelung, the Republic of China

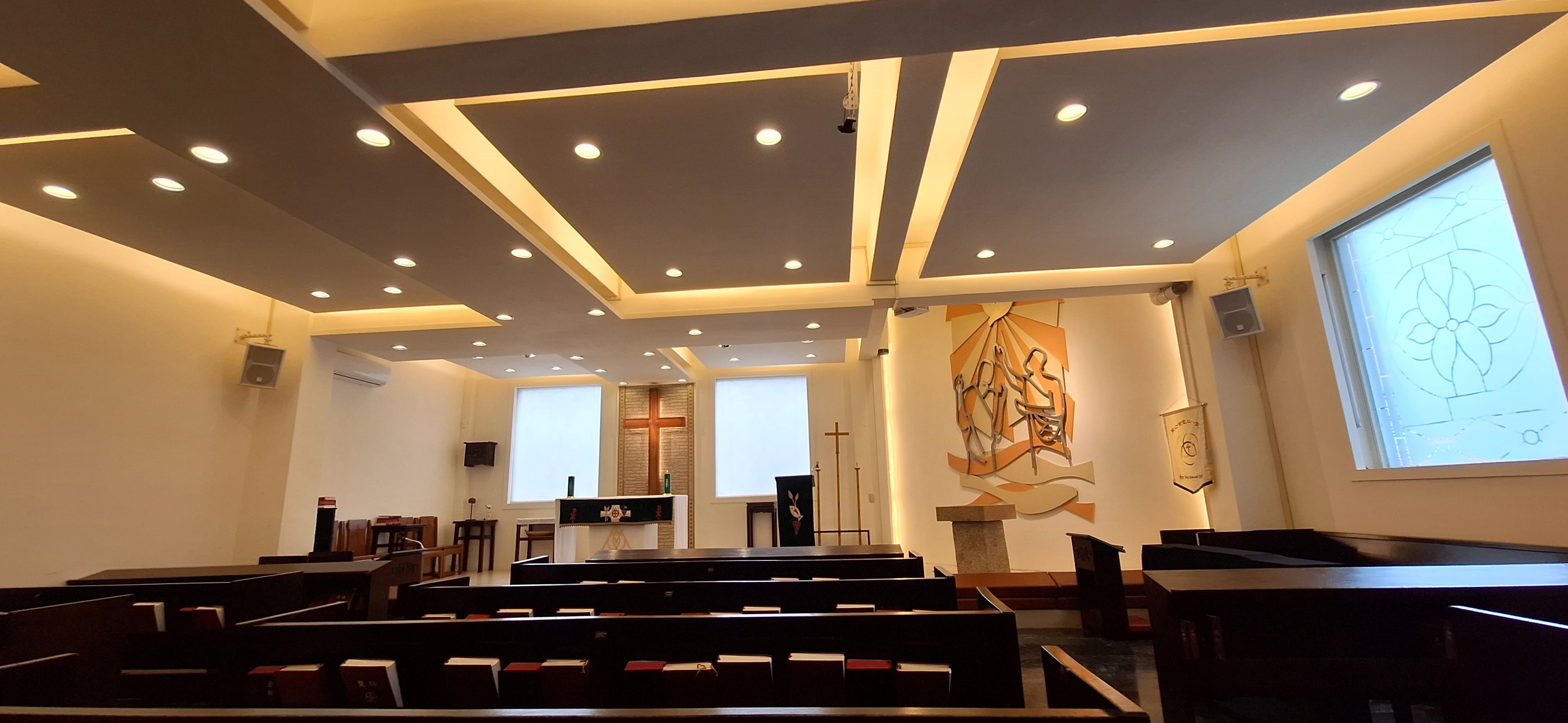
Inside the Holy Trinity Episcopal Church

Holy Trinity Church, Keelung (Chinese: 基隆聖三一堂), is a Protestant church located at t No. 163 Tung Ming Road, Hsinyi District, Keelung, an important port city in northern Taiwan. It belongs to the Taiwan Episcopal Church.

== History ==
In 1952, Bishop Charles P. Gilson (吉爾生主教) dispatched Rev. Yue-Han Lin (林約翰) to take charge of establishing a church in Keelung. In November, 1952, Rev. Lin purchased a two-story building at No. 53 Tung Ming Road. In May 1953, on the Day of Pentecost, Bishop Gilson consecrated Holy Trinity Church and appointed Rev. Lin as pastor.

In February 1967, the new Holy Trinity building was built as a four-story building at No. 163 Tung Ming Road, which is today's church building. Its second floor was used as a chapel, third floor as the priest's residence, and fourth floor as the student dormitory for the local Keelung junior high girls' school.

In January 1991, Rev. Ling-Ling Chang (張玲玲) became a pastor. During her ministry, she found the church building was affected by the humid climate of the area for many years, causing significant peeling off of the inner and outer walls, to the ineffective use of the building. Thanks to the enthusiastic support and dedication of the parishioners and colleagues, the renovation work was successfully completed, and the church regained its new appearance, and once again embarked on the renewed path of missionary work.

On February 1, 2014, Rev. Hsun-Ming Lin (林俊明) took over as pastor, and continues to this day. In June 2023, Holy Trinity Church, Keelung, celebrated its 50th anniversary.

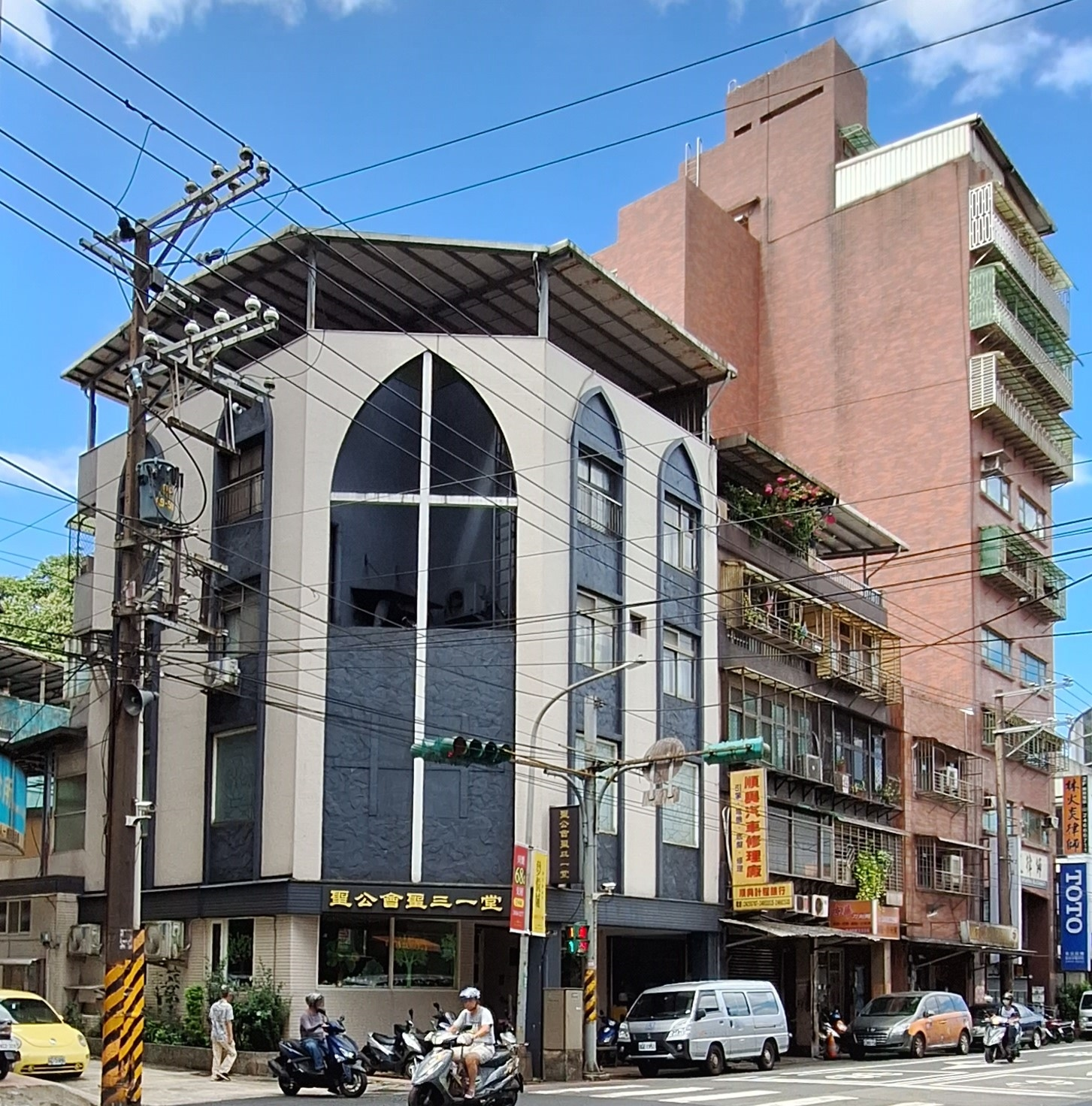
An Outside View of the Holy Trinity Episcopal Church

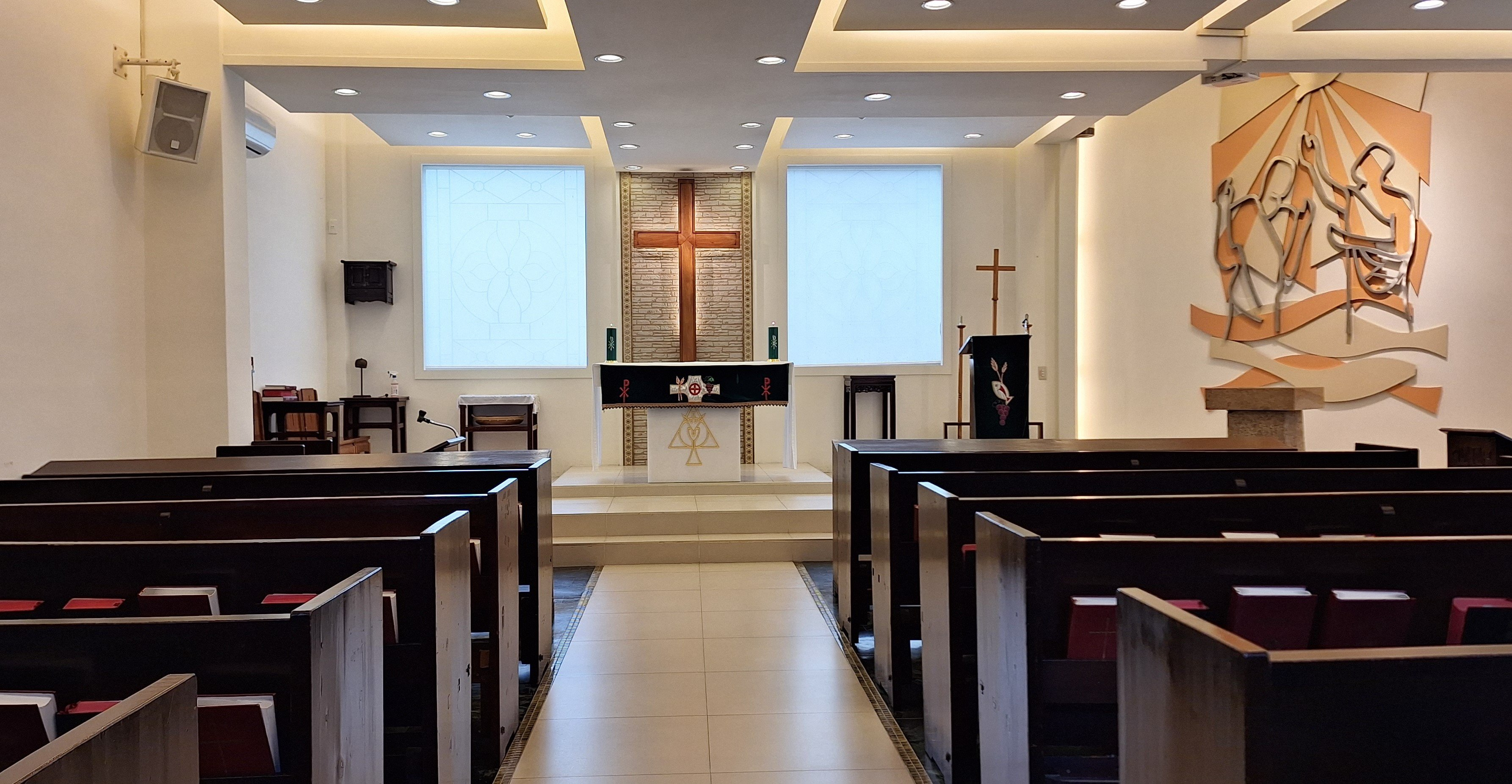
An Inside View of the Holy Trinity Episcopal Church

== Transportation ==
From Taiwan Railway's Keelung railway station, it takes about ten minutes to reach Holy Trinity Church for a distance of one kilometer. From the Port of Keelung, it takes about 20 minutes by taxi.

== See also ==
- Christnianity in Taiwa
- Keelung City
- Taipei–Keelung metropolitan area
- St. Stephen's Church, Keelung (基隆聖司提反堂) - Another new church of the Taiwan Episcopal Church (Est. 2016)
