= Episcopal Diocese of Taiwan =

Diocese of the Episcopal Church of the United States

Diocese of Taiwan 臺灣聖公會
- Coat of arms

Location
- Country: Taiwan
- Ecclesiastical province: Province VIII (formerly Nippon Sei Ko Kai)

Statistics
- Congregations: 15 (2025)
- Members: 1,315 (2025)

Information
- Denomination: Episcopal Church
- Cathedral: St. John's Cathedral, Taipei

Current leadership
- Bishop: Lennon Yuan-Jung Chang
- Coadjutor: Keith Chen-Cheng Lee
- Bishops emeritus: David Jung-hsin Lai

Website
- episcopalchurch.org.tw

The Episcopal Diocese of Taiwan (Chinese: 臺灣聖公會), also known as the Taiwan Episcopal Church, is the Anglican diocese in Taiwan and a member diocese of the Episcopal Church of the United States. It was established in 1954, five years after Chinese Episcopalians fled from mainland China to Taiwan following the Chinese Communist Revolution in 1949.

Early leadership included American military chaplains connected to the Church of the Good Shepherd or St. John's, but in 1965 the Diocese elected its first Chinese bishop. In late 2019 Lennon Yuan-Jung Chang was elected the sixth Bishop of Taiwan, and was consecrated on February 22, 2020.

It is a diocese of Province 8 of the Episcopal Church in the United States of America. In 2025, the diocese reported average Sunday attendance (ASA) of 844 persons.

Keith Chen-Cheng Li was elected seventh Bishop of Taiwan on May 9, 2026. On November 7, 2026, Lee was consecrated as the Diocese of Taiwan’s bishop coadjutor.

== History ==
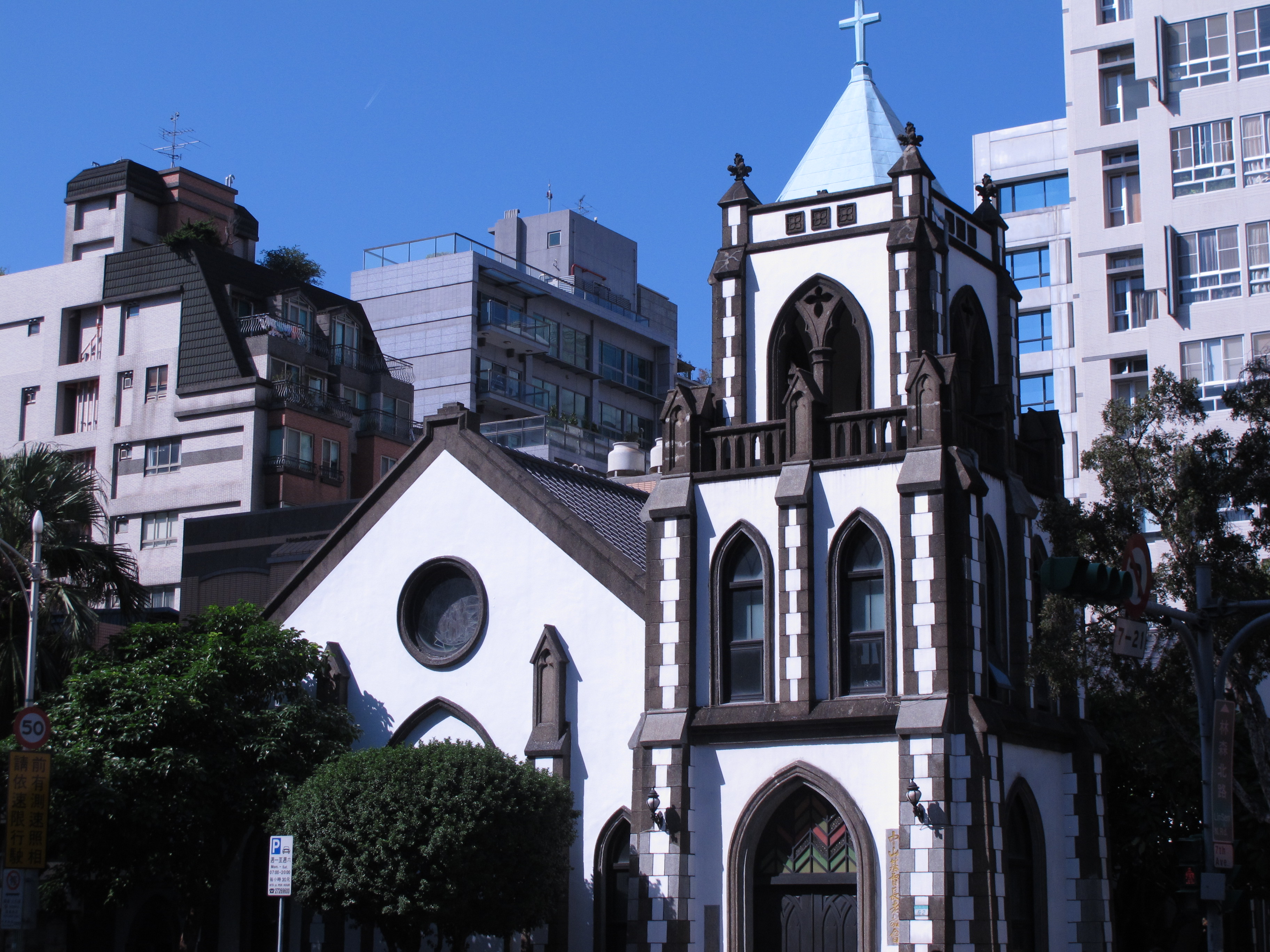
Chungshan Presbyterian Church (originally the Taisho-cho Anglican Church during the Japanese Rule) in Taipei

From the earliest origins of Anglicanism on Taiwan until 1945, the island was part of the Nippon Sei Ko Kai Diocese of Osaka. As the presence of American Episcopalians on the island grew, the island came under the jurisdiction of the Episcopal Diocese of Honolulu until 1954, when it achieved some independence — the 60th anniversary of this date was celebrated in 2014. In 1961, Taiwan became a missionary diocese of the Episcopal Church (USA); and in 1988 it was accepted as a full diocese of the church.

== Parishes ==
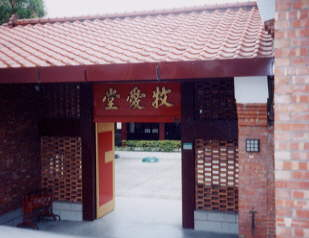
The Church of the Good Shepherd in Taipei

Parishes of the diocese:

Church	Address
Epiphany Chapel	7, Lane 105, Section 1, Hangzhou South Road, Zhongzheng District, Taipei City
Advent Church	499 Sec.4 Danjin Road, Tamsui District, New Taipei City (inside St. John's University)
St. John's Cathedral (Diocesan Cathedral)	280, Section 2, Fuxing South Road, Daan District, Taipei City
Church of the Good Shepherd	509 Zhongzheng Road, Shilin District, Taipei City
St. Thomas Church	86 Minyou Street, Linkou District, New Taipei City
Holy Trinity Church	163 Tung Ming Road, Keelung City
St. Stephen's Church	No. 29, Aly. 6, Ln. 168, Zhonghe Rd., Zhongshan Dist., Keelung City
Christ Church	No. 33, Chongyi 3rd St., Pingzhen District, Taoyuan City
St. Luke's Church	1-6 Ming Hsin Street, Hualien City
St. Matthew's Church	No.152 Sanmin Road, Zhubei City, Hsinchu County
St. James Church	No. 23, Section 1, Wuquan West Road, West District, Taichung City
St. Gabriel's Church	No. 208 Sec. 1 Chongde 2nd Road, Beitun District, Taichung City
St. Peter's Church	8 Hsin Chung Street, Chiayi City
Grace Church	24 Lane 550 Tsung Te Road, Tainan City
All Saints' Church	5 Chieh Shou Road, Gangshan District, Kaohsiung City
St. Paul's Church	200 Tzu Chiang 1st Road, Sanmin District, Kaohsiung City
St. Timothy's Church	3F. No. 262 Chung-hsiao 1st. Rd. Sinsing District, Kaohsiung City
St. Mark's Church	120 - 11 Chung Hsiao Road, Pingtung City

== Bishops ==
From 1954 until 1960, Harry S. Kennedy, Bishop of Hawaii, had direct care of Taiwan; from 1961 until 1964, Charles P. Gilson, Suffragan Bishop of Honolulu, was delegated care of the missionary diocese and was resident on the island.

Further bishops of the missionary diocese were:

- James C. L. Wong (1965–1970; Chinese: 王長齡; formerly Bishop of Jesselton)
- James Pong (1971–1979; Chinese: 龐德明)
- Pui-Yeung Cheung (1980–1987; Chinese: 張培揚)

Since full diocesan status was granted, the bishops diocesan have been:

- John C. T. Chien (1988–2001; Chinese: 簡啟聰)
- David Jung-Hsin Lai (2001–2020; Chinese: 賴榮信)
- Lennon Yuan-Rung Chang (2020–present; Chinese: 張員榮)
- Keith Chen-Cheng Lee (bishop coadjutor)

=== Charles P. Gilson ===
Charles Packard Gilson (Chinese: 吉爾生; September 3, 1899, Portland, Maine – August 11, 1980, New London, New Hampshire), was consecrated a bishop at St Paul's Cathedral, Detroit during the Episcopal Church's 1961 General Convention. He had been missionary-in-charge at Taipei since 1958 when Convention elected him Suffragan Bishop of Honolulu in order to be the bishop resident on Taiwan. In 1964, his geographical jurisdiction (but not his post as Suffragan) was shifted to Okinawa.

=== Lennon Yuan-Rung Chang ===
Lennon Yuan-Rung Chang (given name Yuan-Rung/Yuanrong, English name Lennon; Chinese: 張員榮) was consecrated a bishop on February 22, 2020 at St John's Cathedral, Taipei. Deaconed in 1995 and priested in 1999, he served as Chaplain of St. John's University (Taiwan) (1997–2016) and then as Vicar/Rector of Advent Church (on the same campus); he was also an associate professor of Mathematics at the university (1983–2016). Chang was elected bishop diocesan on August 3, 2019 and was duly consecrated and installed in 2020 by Michael Curry, Presiding Bishop (assisted by co-consecrators: Lai Jung-Hsin, then-Bishop of Taiwan; Bob Fitzpatrick, Bishop of Hawaii; Nathaniel Makoto Uematsu, Primate of Nippon Sei Ko Kai; Haruhisa Iso, Bishop of Osaka; and Greg Rickel, Bishop of Olympia). He served briefly as coadjutor bishop and succeeded as bishop diocesan automatically upon Lai's retirement in March 2020.

== See also ==
- Anglican Communion
