= St. John's University (Taiwan) =

Institution in New Taipei City, Taiwan

Coordinates: 25.2270°N 121.4506°E

St. John’s University
- 聖約翰科技大學 (Chinese)
- Motto: 德以輔才，學以致用
- Motto in English: Talent serves virtue, Learning serves society
- Established: 1851 (establishment of St. Mary's Hall, Shanghai); 1879 (establishment of St. John's University, Shanghai); 1967 (refoundation in Taiwan)
- Religious affiliation: Anglican Communion; Episcopal Church of the United States
- Location: New Taipei, Taiwan
- Campus: Urban
- Website: eng.sju.edu.tw

Chinese name
- Traditional Chinese: 聖約翰科技大學
- Simplified Chinese: 圣约翰科技大学
Transcriptions
Standard Mandarin
- Hanyu Pinyin: Shèngyuēhàn Kējì Dàxué
- Tongyong Pinyin: Shèngyuehàn Kejì Dàsyué
Southern Min
- Hokkien POJ: Sèng-iok-hān Kho-ki Tāi-ha̍k

St. John's University (SJU; Chinese: 聖約翰科技大學) is a higher education institution in Tamsui District, New Taipei, Taiwan. It is the successor institution of the former St. John's University, Shanghai and St. Mary's Hall, Shanghai, which were well-known educational institutions founded in 1879 and 1918, respectively, by Bishop John Schereschewsky of the American Episcopal Church.

SJU is accredited by the ACCSB and affiliates with CUAC and ACUCA.

== History ==
In 1952, the Chinese Communists forced St. John's University in Shanghai to give up its name and merge with other universities. In response to the loss of the school's identity, a group of distinguished alumni in Taiwan resolved to restore their alma mater in Taipei. In 1961, with the approval of the American Episcopal Church in Taiwan, the alumni of St. John's University, in conjunction with the alumnae of the former St. Mary's Hall of Shanghai, enthusiastically donated money to purchase land in the town of Tamsui in Taipei County for the school campus.

In 1967, The Ministry of Education authorized the school to open as a five-year junior college of Industry and named it after its location, Hsin-pu (新埔). Nonetheless, its English name—St. John's & St. Mary's Institute of Technology—continued to honor the history and traditions of the alumni's two illustrious alma maters. In 1993, the school was accredited as an Institute of Business and Industry; and then, because of its excellent educational reputation, upgraded its status to an Institute of Technology in 1999. After decades of work to fulfill the aspirations of its alumni at home and abroad, the school's official Chinese name was changed on October 10, 2003, from 新埔技術學院 (Hsinpu Institute of Technology) to 聖約翰技術學院 (St. John's & St. Mary's Institute of Technology). On August 1, 2005, after constant and collective efforts, the school was officially upgraded to a University of Science and Technology, and was able to restore its original school name, St. John's University (SJU).

The founder of the school was Dr. James C. L. Wong, the first Chinese Bishop of the Taiwan Episcopal Church. Dr. Vivien Yen was the school's first president, and Bishop James C. L. Wong was its first board chairman. The succeeding chairpersons have been Dr. George K. C. Yeh( Acting Chair); Bishop James T. M. Pong; and, since 1972, Dr. Cecilia Koo. Past presidents, in addition to Dr. Yen, were Bishop James Pong, Professor William Yue-Jen Hsia, Dr. Yeh Chi-Tung, and Dr. Andrew C. Chang. Dr. Peter Tuen-Ho Yang has served as president since August 1, 2002.

In 2019, the university had an enrollment rate of 43.10%.

== Academic departments (2026) ==
College of Electrical-Electronic and Computer Engineering

- Master's Program in Electrical Engineering
- Department of Electrical Engineering
- Department of Smart Construction (2026 Newly Founded)
- Department of Computer Science and Information Engineering(2027, will be Abolished )
- Department of Mechanical and Vehicle Engineering(2027, will be Abolished )

College of Business and Management

- Department of Industrial management

College of Humanities and Social Sciences

- Department of Leisure Sports and Hotel management
- Departnent of Multi-Media design
- Departnent of Department of Senior Citizen Welfare and Health Promotion

== Research Laboratories ==
=== Precision Instrument Center ===
The Precision Instrument Center (PIC) of St. John's University was founded on April 26, 2006 with the purposes of improving teaching quality and promoting high-tech researching calibers. The PIC has integrated Opto-Mechatronics Research Center(OMRC) and High Speed Circuit Board(HSPCB) Research Center of this school, it is installed with valued instruments and equipment (Clean Room and Sputter are donated by alumnus) to support teaching and the R&D works for the academic and industrial users. The PIC is part of the Department of Mechanical and Computer Aided Engineering; Dr. Rwei-Ching Chang is the dean.

Research Focus:

Education Programs Offered

- Semiconductor Technology Program
- Electric Properties Measuring and Testing Program
- Physical Properties Measuring and Testing Program
- Micro Mechatronical Technology Program
- Nano Science and Technology Program
- Semiconductor Equipment Program

Research Fields

- High Dielectric oxidize Electric Characteristic Research of Silicon Semiconductor
- Electric Characteristic and Etching Research of Porous Silicon
- Printed Circuit Board Dielectric Material Characteristic Research
- High Frequency Electric Circuit Designing
- Cordless Reception System Making
- Nano Technology Research
- TFT Making and Analysis
- Micro Mechatronical System Making and Analysis

== See also ==
- List of universities in Taiwan
  - List of schools in the Republic of China reopened in Taiwan
- St. John's College, University of British Columbia, also founded by SJU alumni
