= McTyeire School =

Girls' school in Shanghai (1882–1952)

- 中西女中
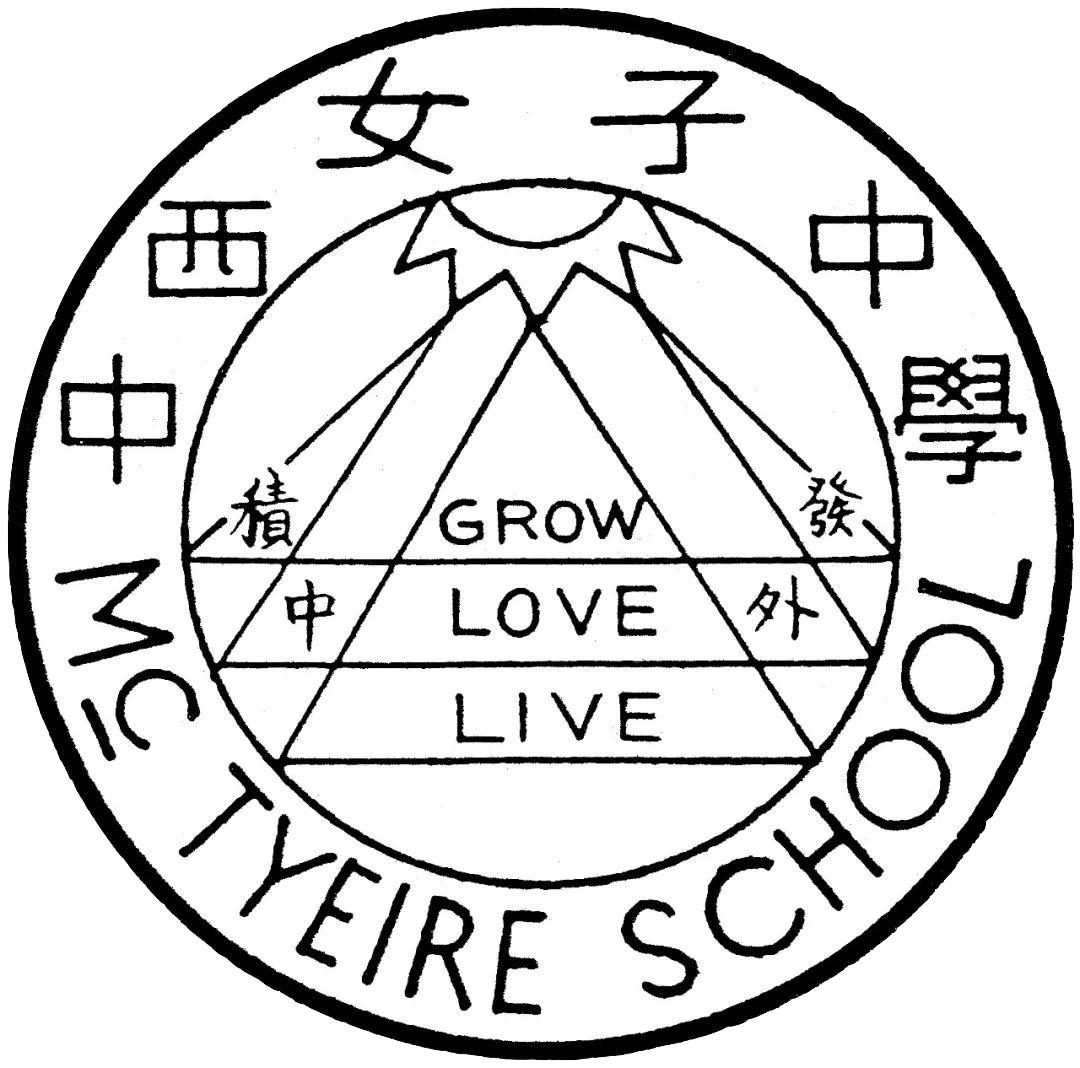

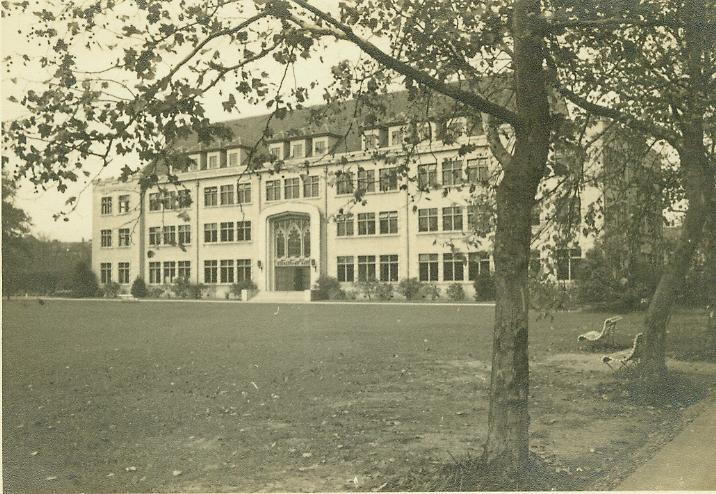

Location
- Edinburgh Road; Shanghai; China

Information
- Type: Private
- Motto: LIVE, LOVE, GROW 積中發外，智圓行方
- Established: 1892
- Principal: Xue Zheng
- Gender: All-Female

McTyeire School
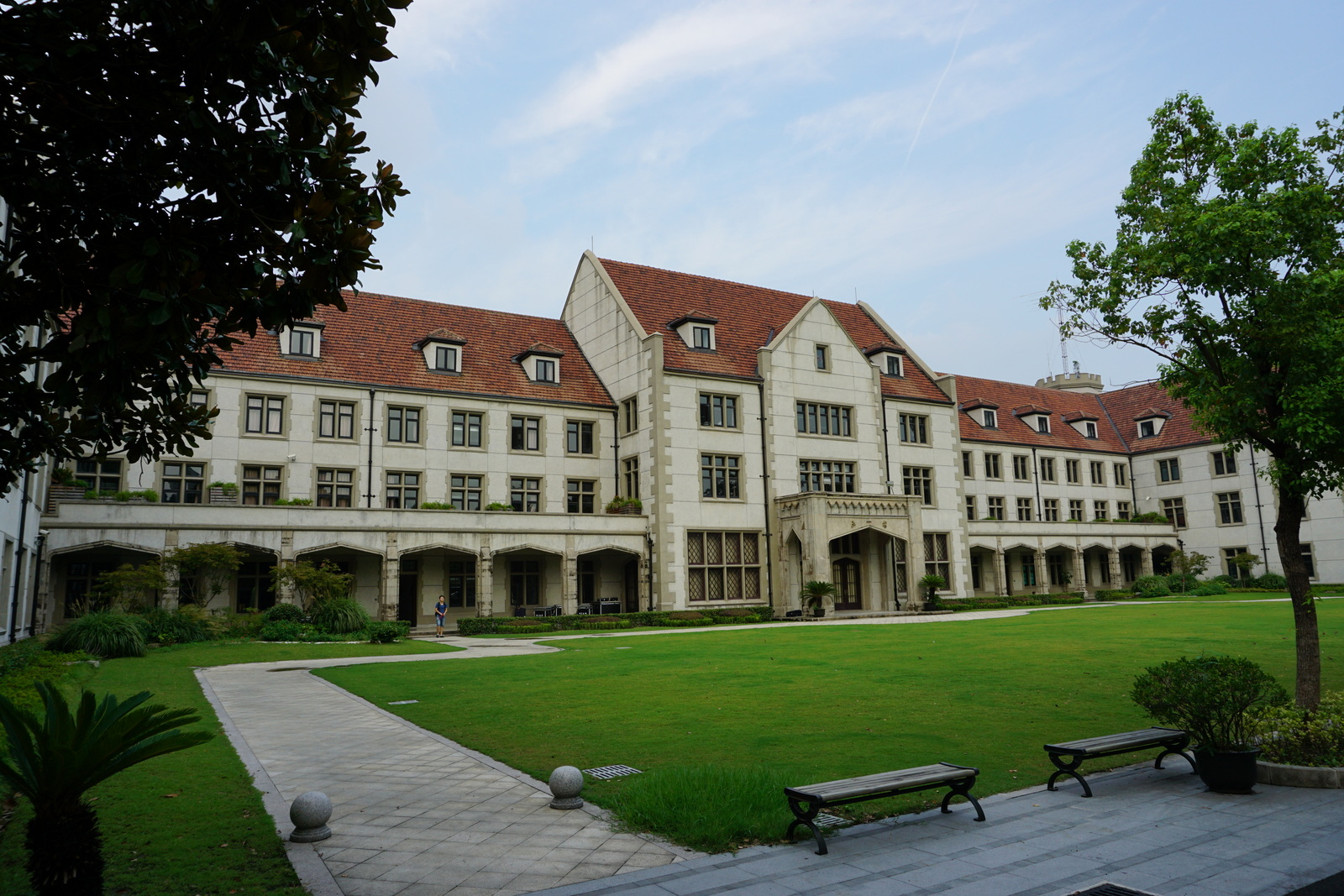
- Former building
- Chinese: 中西女中
- Literal meaning: China-West Girls' Secondary School
Transcriptions
Standard Mandarin
- Hanyu Pinyin: Zhōng Xī Nǚ Zhōng
- Wade–Giles: Chung Hsi Nü Chung

McTyeire School (Chinese: 中西女中) was a private girls' school in Shanghai.

It was established by Young John Allen and Laura Askew Haygood in 1882. Its namesake was Holland Nimmons McTyeire.

== History ==
The school had seven students in 1855 and more than 100 students in 1900. Multiple missionaries of the school lived in a building across from it.

In 1952 it merged with St. Mary's Hall into Shanghai No. 3 Girls' High School.

== Demographics ==
Most of the students originated from Shanghai. The school for its entire history catered to high socioeconomic status families and accordingly drew most its students from them. Citing Qianshi jinsheng (前世今生, "The previous generation and life today") by Su Su (素素), Wang Zheng, author of Women in the Chinese Enlightenment: Oral and Textual Histories, wrote that "parents spent fortunes to make social connections that would help their daughters enroll" at McTyeire due to its prestige.

The Christian Advocate in 1908 stated that, according to Shanghai District presiding elder J. H. Young, 50% of entering students were Christians but that by graduation all students in a class were Christian.

== Notable alumni ==
- Tsai Chin (as "Irene Chow")
- Grace Zia Chu (graduated in 1918 and later taught at McTyeire)
- Pearl Ing (Yin Mingzhu)
- Soong Sisters (Soong Ai-ling, Soong Mei-ling, Soong Ching-ling) - Ai-ling and May-ling began attending at age five while Ching-ling began attending at age 7.
- Me-Iung Ting
- Li Yuin Tsao
- Pauline Woo Tsui
- Wang Yiwei (王伊蔚) - She faced difficulties at the school as she had a northern Chinese background and was unaccustomed to Western education. She transferred to Jinshi High School in Beijing.
- Cecilia S. L. Zung, lawyer, theatre writer, UN delegate
- Zung Wei-tsung, journalist and YWCA leader
- Jin Zhang (artist)
- Georgette Chen, Singaporean Pioneer artist
