= OCA-Asian Pacific American Advocates =

Non-profit organization

- Formation: 1973
- Type: Non-profit, Non-partisan
- Purpose: Activism
- Headquarters: Washington, DC
- Region served: Nationwide
- Members: 10,000
- Key people: Thu Nguyen; Ken Lee; Linda Ng
- Website: https://www.ocanational.org
- Remarks: National Pan-Asian Pacific American civil rights organization headquartered in Washington, DC

OCA-Asian Pacific American Advocates (previously known as the Organization of Chinese Americans) is a non-profit organization founded in 1973, whose stated mission is to advance the social, political, and economic well-being of Asian Americans and Pacific Islanders (AAPIs) in the United States.

== Organization ==
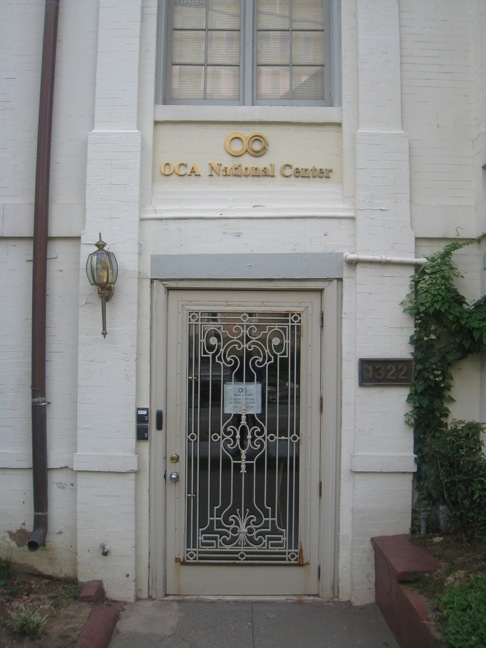
Entrance of the OCA National Center

OCA National Center is located in Dupont Circle in Washington, D.C., and serves as the headquarters for OCA. The national office and staff monitor legislation and policy issues affecting Asian Americans and Pacific Islanders.

== Goals ==
The goals of OCA are to:

- Advocate for social justice, equal opportunity and fair treatment
- Promote civic participation, education, and leadership
- Advance coalitions and community building
- Foster cultural heritage

To achieve these goals, OCA is engaged in organizing 100+ chapters and affiliates across the nation to develop both leadership and community involvement.

== History ==
OCA was founded in 1973 to give voice and representation to Chinese Americans across the United States. Interest in civil rights advocacy had been growing in Chinese American communities since the late 1960s. OCA founders, among them Kung-Lee (K.L.) Wang, recognized a need for an organization to advocate for Chinese Americans on the national level in the same way as the NAACP and the JACL advocated for their respective ethnic groups.

In September 1971, K.L. Wang and others established the Chinese American Leadership Council, the precursor to OCA, in Washington, DC. K.L. Wang then traveled to many cities in the U.S. to promote a national advocacy organization for Chinese Americans. In November 1971, at the urging of K.L. Wang, Alex Mark chaired a steering committee to establish a national organization for Chinese Americans in Detroit, Michigan. By February 1972, the Association of Chinese Americans was established and incorporated in Detroit, with Alex Mark as its first president. In late 1971, K.L. Wang also met with a group of about 20 Chinese Americans in the St. Louis community. This meeting lead to the formation of the League of Chinese Americans in early 1972. William Chang was elected its first president.

On May 3, 1973, Alex Mark and K.L. Wang sent invitation letters for OCA membership to Chinese American communities in Detroit, Pittsburgh, St. Louis, and Washington, DC. These pioneering groups came together at the first National Convention on June 9, 1973. One hundred twelve delegates from across the nation attended the convention, in which the constitution, bylaws and the name of the organization were adopted. Pauline Tsui of Washington, DC, served as the convention committee chair. Anna Chennault was instrumental in recruiting support from Congress and the Administration. K.L. Wang was elected as its first national president. The Association of Chinese Americans in Detroit, while retaining its name, became a chapter. The original OCA in Washington, DC, evolved as a distinct chapter with Harry Woo as its first president. The League of Chinese Americans in St. Louis also joined, becoming the third founding chapter of OCA.

In 2013, OCA's National Board of Directors passed a resolution to change its name to "OCA - Asian Pacific American Advocates" to reflect a more expansive mission to represent the pan-ethnic interests of the community.

== Chapters ==
OCA has more than 50 chapters across the United States. Each chapter develops its own outreach programs, ranging from educational seminars and Chinese language schools to voter registration drives. OCA chapters address a number of issues including inaccurate media portrayals of AAPIs, failed employment practices, hate crimes, and educational access. They also implement programs that aim to foster youth development, leadership development, and professional development in the AAPI community.

== Controversies ==
=== 2009: Miley Cyrus Incident ===
In early 2009, a photograph of Miley Cyrus circulated online in which she had the corners of her eyes pulled back, displaying a slant-eyed expression, while friends, including an Asian male, surrounding her posed in other manners. OCA was one of the first groups to respond to the photograph, by offering criticism and disapproval, hoping that "...Miley Cyrus will apologize to her fans and the AAPI community for this lapse in judgment and takes the opportunity to better understand why the gesture is offensive." A few days later Cyrus responded on her website defending her actions, saying that "in NO way was I making fun of any ethnicity!" OCA Executive Director George Wu responded to Cyrus's response, by adding that, "It's not a real apology. We’re not backing down without a fuller apology."

== National Convention ==
Since its founding in 1973, OCA has held the largest annual conference dedicated to AAPI issues. Each year, the National Convention draws over 1,000 AAPI attendants from across the nation. The convention is a platform for the recognition of unsung heroes of the AAPI community, exemplary local chapters, sponsors, summer interns, and current individuals making a difference in the AAPI community. Recognized individuals and speakers include former Secretary of Labor Elaine Chao, YouTube co-founder Steve Chen, and Congressman Mike Honda.

== Programs ==
=== APIA U: Leadership 101 ===
A training session at Rice University in November 2009

Sponsored by State Farm, OCA visits colleges and universities every Fall and Spring semester to conduct a college leadership training program for Asian American and Pacific Islander student leaders and activists. The program focuses on the development of leadership and organizational skills that are relevant to AAPI campuses and communities.

The interactive college leadership training program involves hands-on exercises, small group discussions, and presentations led by two qualified AAPI facilitators. The one-day training assembles 60 students from each region and focuses on self-awareness, team-building, and direct action organizing. Participants are asked to challenge themselves, share their experiences, and develop leadership tools in order to serve effectively as catalysts for change.

=== OCA Internship Program ===
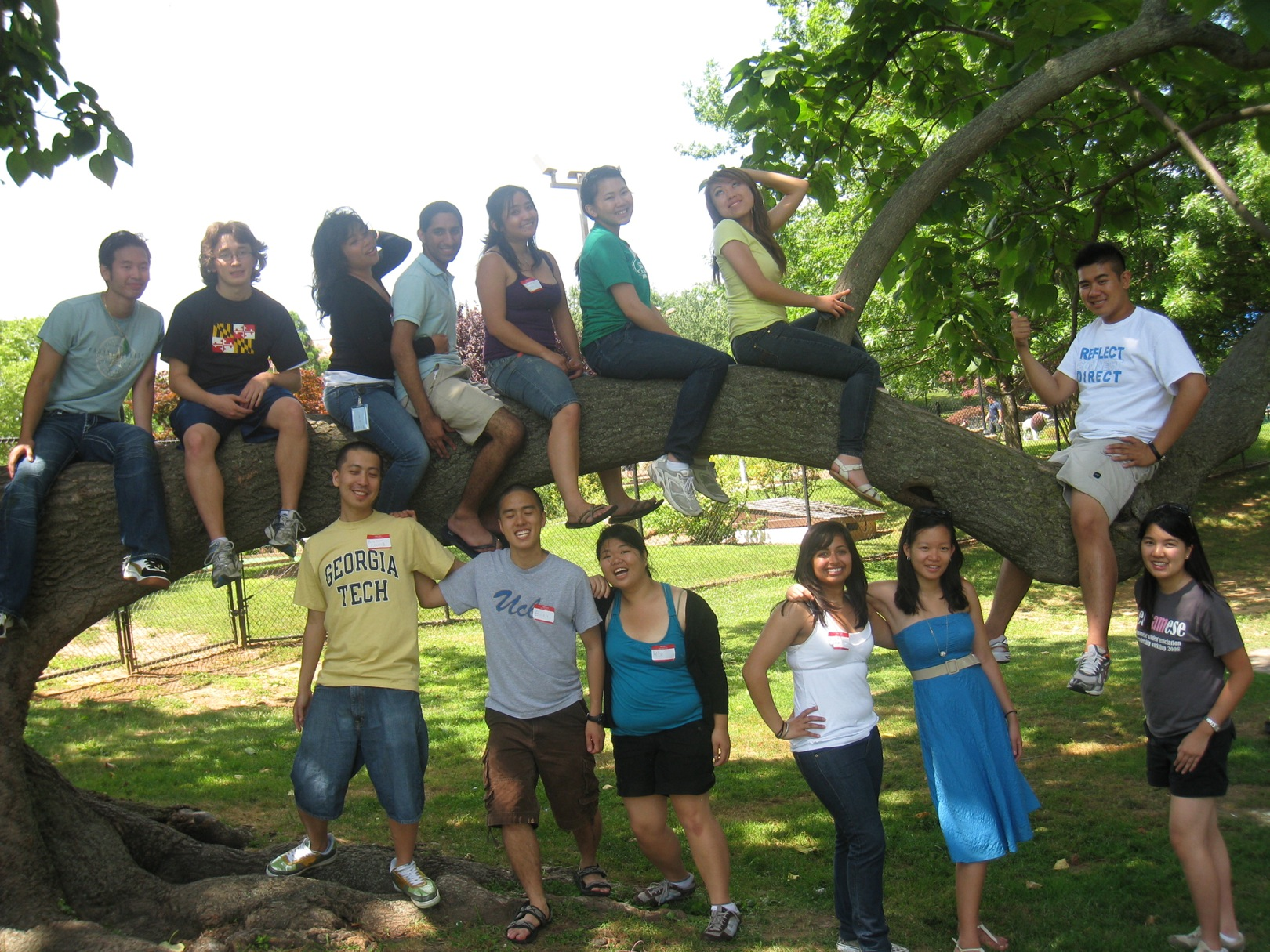
2009 Summer Interns (of the 20th anniversary class) pose for a photo at a local OCA chapter picnic

The OCA internship program was first established in 1989 and has been a flagship component of OCA's involvement with college youth. The internship program enables college interns to learn firsthand about national issues and policies that affect Asian Americans and Pacific Islanders in Washington, DC. In particular, the competitive summer program is known for attracting the best and brightest college students, as it is a 10-week-long program that places interns on Capitol Hill, at federal agencies, or at non-profit organizations (particularly AAPI affiliated organizations).

In the past, the summer program has offered interns the opportunity to participate in brown bag lunches on key issues affecting Asian Americans and Pacific Islanders such as immigration reform and health care, and has included visits to congressional office buildings, where interns meet with representatives, AAPI staffers, and members of the Congressional Asian Pacific American Caucus. Interns have also met with members of various government agencies such as the United States Department of Justice, the United States Department of Defense, and even White House staff members and directors to discuss issues concerning civil rights and voting rights, especially as it pertains to the AAPI community. In addition, summer interns have also assisted the OCA National staff and the host OCA chapter staff at the annual OCA National Convention.

The main internship placements are:

- The OCA National Office (Summer, Fall, Winter & Spring)
- Capitol Hill (Summer only)
- Federal Agencies (Summer only)
- Non-Profits (Summer only)

=== Scholarships ===
The OCA partners with United Parcel Service, Verizon Wireless, and the AXA Foundation to provide scholarships to students, based on their achievements and financial needs.

=== B3: Aspiring AAPI Professionals Program ===
This program aims to provide relevant professional development, peer networking and mentoring to aspiring AAPI professionals; expand BAC engagement, best practices and mentoring; and leverage venue for corporate employee resource group.

It was recently launched in the Fall of 2009.

== Research ==
=== A Portrait of Chinese Americans ===
In 2009, OCA and the Asian American Studies Program of the University of Maryland at College Park (UMD) cooperated in creating a demographic study of Chinese Americans. Entitled A Portrait of Chinese Americans, the study analyzed the latest population statistics and maps and found extraordinary socioeconomic diversity within the Chinese American population at odds with prevailing stereotypes. The study also found evidence of career limitations and unequal pay even for highly educated Chinese Americans, many of whom earned substantially less than their equally educated white counterparts.

== Current projects ==
=== APIA Scholarship, Internship, and Fellowship Directory ===
In July 2009, OCA, in collaboration with the JACL, State Farm, and the Asian American Studies Program of University of Maryland, College Park, produced the 2009-2011 National Directory of Scholarships, Internships, and Fellowships for Asian American and Pacific Islander Students. The Directory provided a 140-page, full-color description of the mission, criteria, award amount, period, application deadline, and contact information of each scholarship, internship, and fellowship for Asian American and Pacific Islander students.

== Notable members ==
- Helen Zia, Asian American scholar and civil rights activist
- Judy Chu, Congresswoman of California's 32nd congressional district
- Mike Honda, Congressman of California's 15th congressional district
- Christina Hsu, The Amazing Race Season 12 and Season 18 contestant, 2000 OCA Summer Intern
- Pauline Woo Tsui, founder of the Organization of Chinese American Women
