= John C. T. Chien =

Taiwanese bishop (1940–2013)

John Chih-Tsung Chien (given name also romanized Qǐcōng; Chinese: 簡啟聰; March 23, 1940 – March 5, 2013) was a Taiwanese Episcopalian bishop who served as the third Bishop of Taiwan (diocesan bishop of the Episcopal Diocese of Taiwan) from 1988 to 2001.

Chien was made deacon on May 21, 1967, ordained priest on November 30, 1967 and consecrated bishop on March 25, 1988.
