= Me-Iung Ting =

Chinese physician and feminist

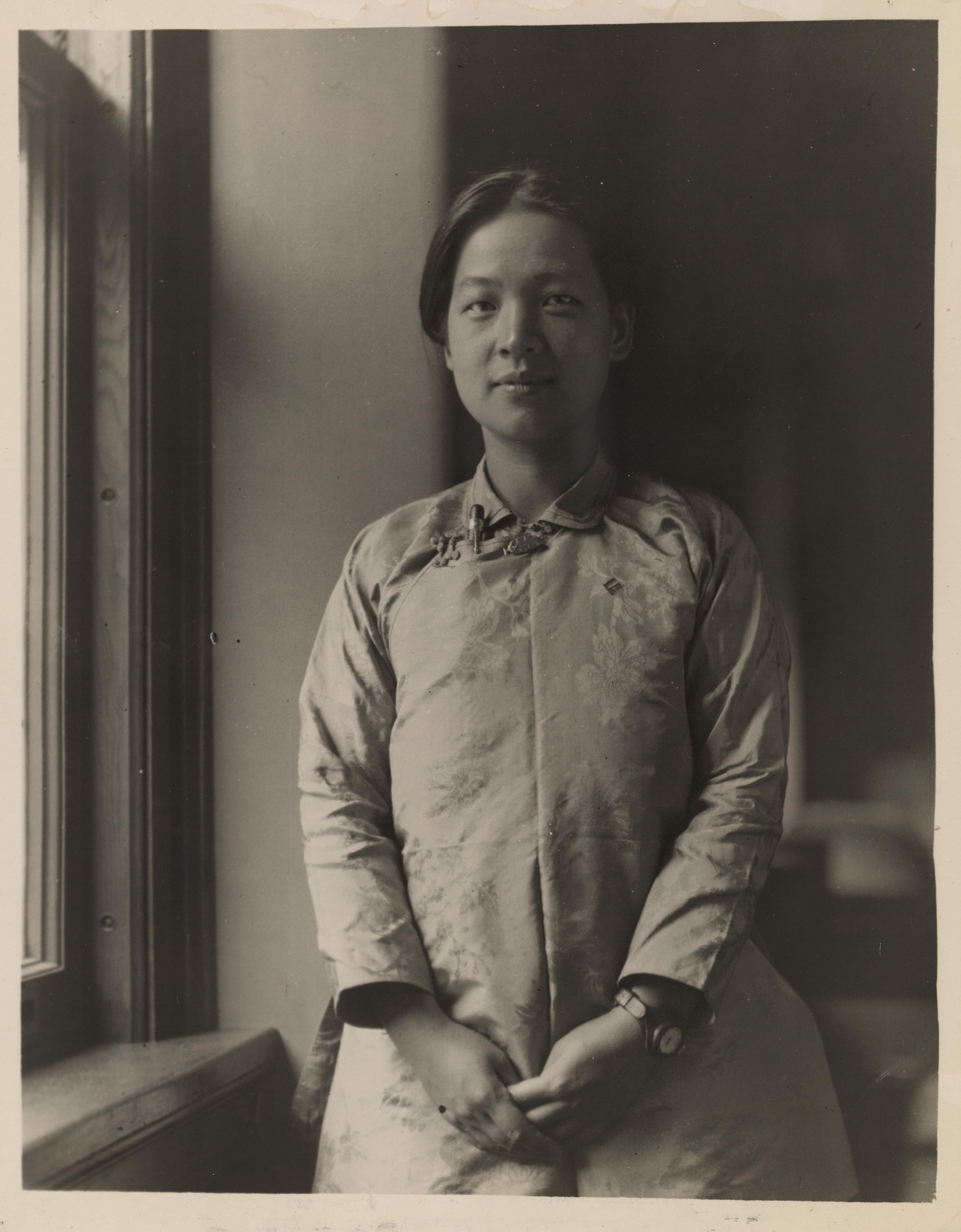
Ting, International Conference of Women Physicians

Me-Iung Ting (Chinese: 丁懋英; pinyin: Dīng Màoyīng; 1891–1969) was a Chinese physician and feminist.

She was the daughter of a well-known Chinese doctor, Ting Gan-Ren. She attended Mount Holyoke College and graduated from the School of Medicine, University of Michigan at Ann Arbor. She was the only Chinese woman there in 1920. She completed her medical school and two additional years of training in Detroit and Philadelphia hospitals before returning to Tianjin, China. She became the director of the Tientsin (Tianjin) Women's Hospital (aka Peiyang Women's Hospital). She also had charge of the city orphanage and two schools. In 1929, Ting returned to the University of Michigan as a Barbour Fellow. She spent her time collecting information for a book on prenatal care. Upon returning to China, she met an old banker, a friend of her father's, who became interested in her work and later published her book in pamphlet form, making it possible for Chinese women to purchase the book for a few cents. That book was the first of its kind in China.

Ting remained the director of Peiyang Women's Hospital in Tianjin since her return to China, and in 1928, she headed the Chinese delegation to the Pan-Pacific Women's Congress in Honolulu. In 1943, Ting became the Chairman of the International Relief Committee in Tianjin. Her work with the multinational refugees was widely recognized.

In 1950, Ting immigrated to America and continued her contributions to medicine.

== Early life ==
When she was a child, her parents, in the proper Chinese tradition, arranged for her betrothal. She attended the McTyeire School in Shanghai where she became a Christian. At the age of 15, she was taken out of school to be married. She would not consent to the marriage and her father was greatly displeased and refused to accept her decision. Her older brother sympathized with her and secretly took her from their home in Shanghai to Hong Kong. From Hong Kong, she went to the United States. She was a Tsinghua (Qinghua) special student and attended Mount Holyoke College from 1914 to 1916, preparing for medical school.

== Life in Tianjin ==
Ting stayed in charge of Peiyang Women's Hospital, increased her hospital staff from 8 to 45, started a training school for nurses, opened temporary branch hospitals in neighboring towns during epidemics, found suitable work for convalescent patients, delivered 10,000 babies, and in 1928 headed the Chinese delegation to the Pan-Pacific Women's Conference at Honolulu.

In 1935, the mayor of Tianjin asked Ting to be the Director of the Tientsin Infants Asylum. This was the first time in the history of Tianjin to have a woman to serve in this government post. The Tientsin Infants Asylum was home to about one hundred unwanted girls ranging from a few days old to 18 years old. The sanitation was atrocious and infant mortality had been extremely high. It took Me-Iung months to fight against measles, diphtheria, meningitis and general malnutrition. She worked out simple Chinese diets to fit the different elements and calorie requirements for the different age groups. The children began to show improvement within a few months.

In the same year, 1935, a house designed for her by architect Yeng Zi-Hun was built at #106 London Road (now Chengdu Road). It was a brick and wood building, combining western and oriental design. The front of the house was a one-story building used as a clinic.

Beginning in 1936, Ting devoted part of her energy to rural health work. 80% of the Chinese lived on farms. Ting organized her nurses and a group of YMCA workers. They went to rural districts surrounding Tianjin and gave 600 free vaccinations against smallpox. They organized simple first aid boxes with drugs for wounds, cuts and minor infections. They gave the first aid boxes and 2 weeks of simple instructions on first aid to the rural teachers. Ting also trained nurse-midwives to be stationed in the surrounding rural areas.

During the Sino-Japanese war, in 1939, Ting was imprisoned by the Japanese from January 11 to January 29, 1939. No reason was given for her arrest. The Alumni Association of the University of Michigan petitioned the American State Department to obtain her release.

Since 1943, Ting was the Chairperson of International Relief committee in Tianjin. Under her leadership, refugee camps were set up for the Koreans who fled from Japan to Manchuria, and now to Tianjin. The refugees were provided with food, shelter and medical care including vaccinations. In 1949, Ting was Chairman of United Nations Emergency Fund for Children.

== Ting in America ==
In 1950 when her hospitals and all her property were taken over by the communist government, she left for Hong Kong and came to the United States via England. She rendered valuable service in a mission hospital in Jacksonville, Florida, and in the Mississippi State Charity Hospital in Vicksburg. She served as house physician and instructor at Tougaloo College in Mississippi, as medical director at the Connecticut State Farm for Women at Niantic, and at the Fernald School in Waverley, Massachusetts.

In October 1952, at the Convocation of Science and Human Values, Mount Holyoke College awarded Ting a citation for her outstanding work as a physician in Tianjin, China from 1922 to 1950. Her award cited her achievements as head of two hospitals, developer of an urban health program, regional president of the China Medical Association, president of China's International Relief Committee (1943 to 1949), and administrator of UNRRA (United Nations Relief and Rehabilitation Administration) funds after its American staff was driven out by the Chinese Communist revolution.

She was attending a medical conference in New York on July 15, 1969, when she died from a heart attack.

One of her friends, Madeleine Wayne Diehl, gave this personal tribute: "She bore the responsibility for human frailties in others. In her own determined and dedicated little body and dauntless spirit she was as strong as anyone I have known, and, in a way, solitary, as great souls often are...ever giving, and forgiving, ever blessing, ever blessed. Oh the dearness of her. Yes, I feel bereft, but I will try to incorporate, in the remaining time of my life, some of the steadfast faith and unswerving loyalty to her high code. Remarkable, oh yes, and also immeasurably lovable. I thank God she counted me as one of her friends."

== Notes ==
(1) As a consequence of the Boxer Rebellion of 1900, China had to pay reparations to eight countries. In 1908, the U.S. used its share for scholarships for Chinese students and for the construction of Tsinghua University in Beijing. The Tsinghua Special Scholarship was also a recipient.

(2) Levi L. Barbour of Detroit, an alumnus and former regent of the University of Michigan, founded the Barbour Scholarship in 1917. While traveling in Asia, he recognized the need there for liberal and scientific education for women, particularly in medicine. He was inspired by the careers of three women physicians who were University alumnae, Drs. Ida Kahn and Mary Stone of China and Tomo Inouye of Japan. His purposes were ultimately achieved, as evidenced by the remarkable careers of subsequent Barbour scholars, including Dr. Ting.
