= Shanghai No. 3 Girls' High School =

Public school in Shanghai, China

Coordinates: 31.2225°N 121.4304°E

- 上海市第三女子中学

Location
- 155 Jiangsu Road; Changning, Shanghai; China

Information
- Type: Public
- Motto: I(Independent Chinese: 独立)，A(Ability Chinese: 能干)，C(Care Chinese: 关爱)，E(Elegant Chinese: 优雅)
- Established: 1892
- Principal: Xu Yongchu (徐永初)
- Faculty: 110
- Gender: All-Female
- Enrollment: over 1100
- Campus: 53,360 square metres (13.19 acres)
- Website: www.ssnz.sh.cn

Shanghai No. 3 Girls' High School
- Simplified Chinese: 上海市第三女子中学
- Traditional Chinese: 上海市第三女子中学
Transcriptions
Standard Mandarin
- Hanyu Pinyin: Shànghǎishì Dìsān Nǚzǐ Zhōngxué
- Wade–Giles: Shang-hai-shih Ti-san Nü-tzu Chung-hsüeh

Shanghai No. 3 Girls' High School (上海市第三女子中学) is a public all-female secondary school in Shanghai, China.

The predecessors of the school were St. Mary's Hall, established in 1881, and McTyeire School, established in 1892.

The nearest subway station is Jiang Su Road Station, 5th exit, Line 2.
