= The 1990 Institute =

- Type: 501(c)(3) organization
- Tax ID no.: 94-3112912
- Purpose: Education
- Headquarters: San Francisco, California, United States
- Region served: China, United States
- Key people: Daniel K.H. Chao (Chair)
- Website: 1990institute.org

The 1990 Institute is a San Francisco-based not-for-profit organization that advocates for cultural and education exchanges between the United States and the People's Republic of China.

== See also ==
- National Committee on United States–China Relations
- US–China Peoples Friendship Association
