= Province 8 of the Episcopal Church =

Coordinates: 40°N 120°W

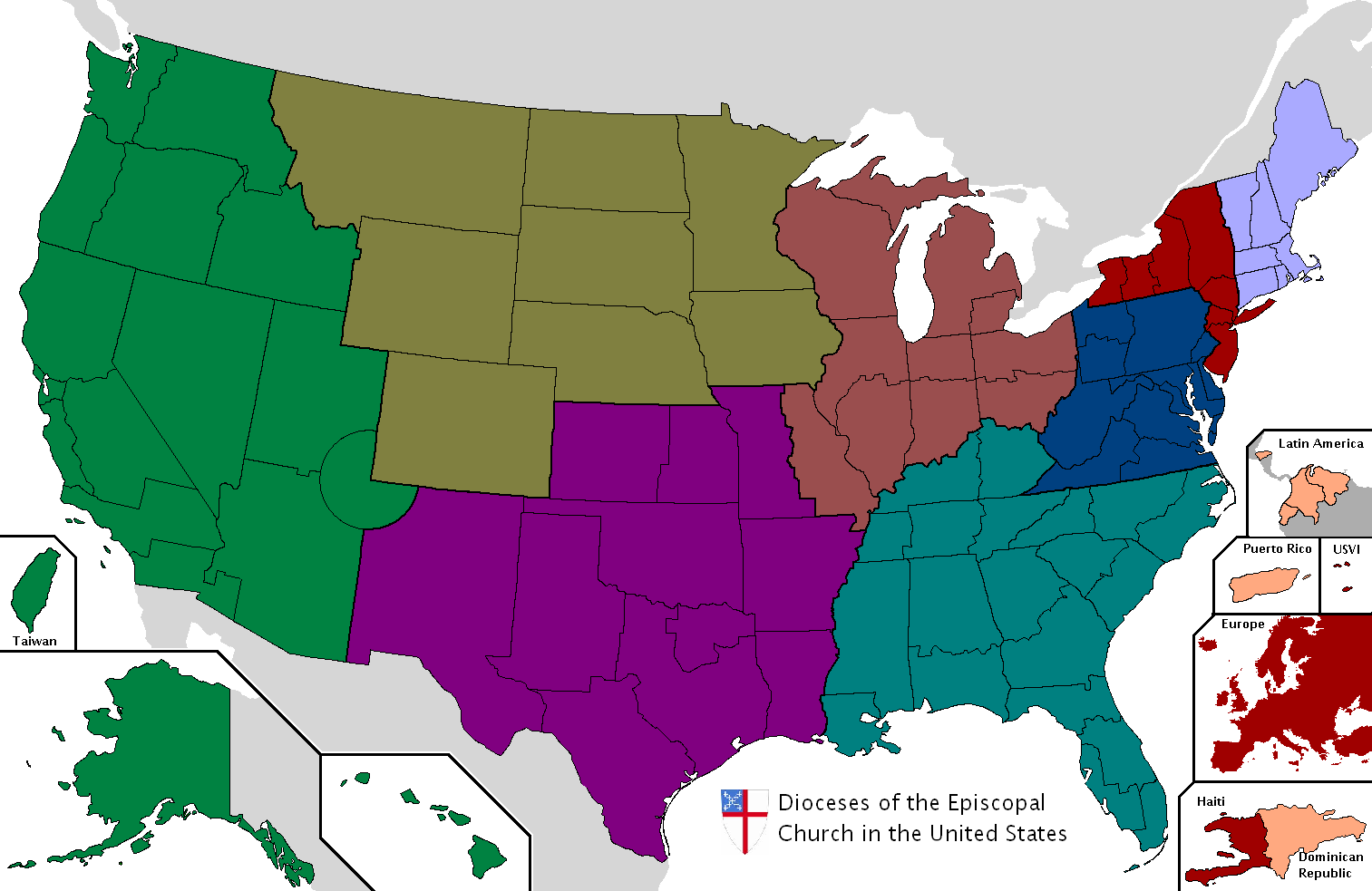
Province VIII of the ECUSA

Province 8 (VIII), also called the Province of the Pacific, is one of nine ecclesiastical provinces making up the Episcopal Church in the United States of America. It is composed of sixteen dioceses in the nine states of Alaska, Arizona, California, Hawaii, Idaho, Nevada, Oregon, Utah, and Washington. Also part of the province are the Episcopal Diocese of Taiwan, which has been a diocese of the Church since 1960; and the Navajoland Area Mission which was established in 1979 to serve the specific spiritual and cultural needs of the Navajo Nation.

The province encompasses more than a third of the land mass of the United States, and nearly twenty percent of the country's population. Because of its sheer size, the province claims to contain the most demographically diverse population in the world. The Rt. Rev. Gretchen Rehberg of the Diocese of Spokane serves as president and Rev. Tom Sramek Jr. of the Diocese of Oregon serves as vice president.

== Dioceses of Province VIII ==
- Diocese of Alaska
- Diocese of Arizona
- Diocese of California
- Diocese of Eastern Oregon
- Diocese of El Camino Real
- Diocese of Hawaii
- Diocese of Idaho
- Diocese of Los Angeles
- Diocese of Nevada
- Diocese of Northern California
- Diocese of Olympia
- Diocese of Oregon
- Diocese of San Diego
- Diocese of San Joaquin
- Diocese of Spokane
- Diocese of Taiwan
- Diocese of Utah

== Other jurisdictions of Province VIII ==
- Navajoland Area Mission
- Episcopal Church in Micronesia

== References and external links ==
- ECUSA Province Directory (2010 archived version)
- Province VIII website
