= James C. L. Wong =

- Traditional Chinese: 王長齡
- Simplified Chinese: 王长龄
Transcriptions

James Chang-Ling Wong (Chinese: 王長齡; 17 February 1900 – 27 April 1970) was a Chinese Anglican (Episcopalian) bishop who served as Bishop of Jesselton in Sarawak from 1962 to 1964 and then Bishop of Taiwan from 1965 until his death in 1970.

He was born in Beijing during the Qing Dynasty.

Wong was consecrated a bishop on 3 February 1960, by Ronald Hall, Bishop of Victoria, at St Thomas' Cathedral, Kuching; to serve as Assistant Bishop of Borneo. He was then elected the first bishop of the new Diocese of Jesselton (now Sabah), when it separated from the Diocese of Borneo in 1962.

Having retired from Jesselton on 30 September, Wong was elected the first Chinese Bishop of Taiwan by the House of Bishops of The Episcopal Church at the General Convention on 21 October 1964. The diocese had previously been under the care of a suffragan of the Bishop of Hawaii.

He was the first Bishop in the Anglican Communion to come out of the background of the voluntary priesthood, serving from 1965 until his death in 1970. He had previously served as Bishop of Guangzhou, an assistant bishop of Victoria diocese from his 1960 consecration by Ronald Hall until his appointment to Jesselton.
