= Dunstan (surname) =

Dunstan is a surname. Notable people with the surname include:

- Albert Dunstan (1882–1950), Australian politician
- Alex Dunstan (1885–1964), Australian rules footballer
- Bernard Dunstan (1920–2017), British artist
- Bill Dunstan (1949–2022), American football player
- Darren Dunstan (born 1972), Canadian–American voice actor
- David Dunstan (born 1950), Australian writer, journalist and historian
- Don Dunstan (1926–1999), Australian politician in South Australia
- Donald Dunstan (governor) (1923–2011), Australian army officer, later Governor of South Australia
- Eric Dunstan (1894–1973), British radio announcer and commentator
- George Dunstan (born 1938), Australian broadcaster and sports administrator
- George Dunstan (footballer) (1904–1965), Australian rules footballer
- Graeme Dunstan, multiple people
- Ian Dunstan (born 1955), Australian rules footballer
- Jeffrey Dunstan (c. 1759–1797), English wig merchant and popular candidate in the Garrat Elections
- Jordan Dunstan (born 1993), Canadian soccer player
- Joy Dunstan (born 1951), Australian actress
- Keith Dunstan (1925–2013), Australian journalist and author, son of William Dunstan
- Luke Dunstan (born 1995), Australian rules footballer
- Malcolm Dunstan (born 1950), English cricketer
- Marcus Dunstan (born 1975), American screenwriter and director
- Maurie Dunstan (1929–1991), Australian rules football
- Peggy Dunstan (1920–2010), New Zealand poet and writer
- Priscilla Dunstan, Australian singer and developer of the Dunstan Baby Language hypothesis
- Robert Dunstan (1877–1963), British doctor and political activist
- Robert Dunstan (c. 1955–2023), Australian music journalist and champion of local music
- Terry Dunstan (born 1968), British boxer
- Thomas Dunstan (Australian politician) (1873–1954), Australian politician
- Thomas B. Dunstan (1850–1902), American politician
- Thomas Dunstan (water polo) (born 1997), American water polo player
- William Dunstan (1895–1957), Australian soldier and Victoria Cross recipient
- Wyndham Dunstan (1861–1949), British chemist and academic
