= St Dunstan's =

St Dunstan's may refer to:

- Blind Veterans UK, a charity formerly known as St Dunstan's
- St Dunstan's (Tower Hamlets ward), an electoral district in London, England
- St Dunstan's Church (disambiguation), several churches
- St. Dunstan's Farm Meadows, a Site of Special Scientific Interest in East Sussex, England
- St Dunstans railway station, a closed station in Bradford, West Yorkshire, England
- St Dunstan's School (disambiguation), several schools
- Saint Dunstan's University, a former university on Prince Edward Island, Canada
- St. Dunstan's Well Catchment, a cave system in Somerset, England

== See also ==
- Dunstan (disambiguation)
- St Dunstan, a Christian saint, 10th century Archbishop of Canterbury
