= 2008 California Proposition 2 =

Proposition 2
- November 4, 2008
- Standards for Confining Farm Animals

Results
Choice	Votes	%
Yes	8,203,769	63.42%
No	4,731,738	36.58%
Valid votes	12,935,507	94.12%
Invalid or blank votes	807,670	5.88%
Total votes	13,743,177	100.00%
Registered voters/turnout	17,304,091	79.42%
County results
Yes
90–100%
80–90%
70–80%
60–70%
50–60%
No
90–100%
80–90%
70–80%
60–70%
50–60%

Proposition 2 was a California ballot proposition in that state's general election on November 4, 2008. It passed with 63% of the vote in favor and 37% against, enacting the Prevention of Farm Animal Cruelty Act and submitting it to the Secretary of State. The initiative's name (as with others such as Proposition 8) was amended to be officially known as the Standards for Confining Farm Animals initiative. The official title of the statute enacted by the proposition is the Prevention of Farm Animal Cruelty Act.

The proposition adds a chapter to Division 20 of the California Health and Safety Code to prohibit the confinement of certain farm animals in a manner that does not allow them to turn around freely, lie down, stand up, and fully extend their limbs. The measure addresses three types of confinement: veal crates, battery cages, and sow gestation crates.

Having been passed by the voters on November 4, 2008, the key portion of the statute became operative on January 1, 2015. Farming operations had until that date to implement the new space requirements for their animals, and the statute now prohibits animals in California from being confined in a proscribed manner.

Few veal and pig factory farm operations exist in California, so Proposition 2 mostly affects farmers who raise California's 15 million egg-laying hens.

In 2010 the California legislature passed AB 1437, which required shell eggs sold in the state to meet the same requirements. Both Proposition 2 and AB 1437 went into effect in 2015. In 2018, a new ballot measure, Proposition 12, closed loopholes in these laws by requiring the same standards for all eggs and pork sold in the state, regardless of the form in which it was sold (i.e. both shell eggs and liquid eggs), and the state in which it was produced. Proposition 12 was implemented on January 1, 2022, but was temporarily blocked by a judge following legal challenges brought by representatives of the pork industry. In 2023, in National Pork Producers Council v. Ross, the Supreme Court of the United States upheld Proposition 12.

== Ballot measure summary ==
The California Secretary of State's summary from the Official Voter Information Guide of Proposition 2 is as follows:

- Requires that calves raised for veal, egg-laying hens and pregnant pigs be confined only in ways that allow these animals to lie down, stand up, fully extend their limbs and turn around freely.
- Exceptions made for transportation, rodeos, fairs, 4-H programs, lawful slaughter, research and veterinary purposes.
- Provides misdemeanor penalties, including a fine not to exceed $1,000 and/or imprisonment in jail for up to 180 days.

Summary of Legislative Analyst's Estimate of Net State and Local Government Fiscal Impact:

- Potential unknown decrease in state and local tax revenues from farm businesses, possibly in the range of several million dollars annually.
- Potential minor local and state enforcement and prosecution costs, partly offset by increased fine revenue.

== Similar laws ==
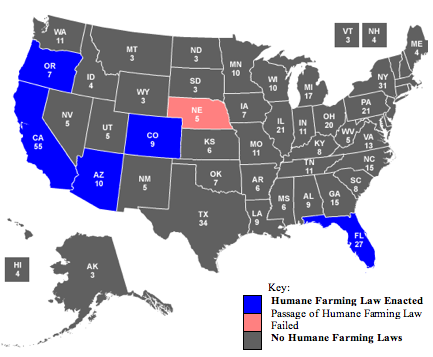
As of November 2008, five states have enacted laws in support of humane farming.

=== Implemented laws ===
Similar laws have been enacted in other parts of the United States and Europe.

- On November 5, 2002, Florida voters passed Amendment 10, an amendment to the Florida Constitution banning the confinement of pregnant pigs in gestation crates. The Amendment passed by a margin of 55% for and 45% against.
- On November 7, 2006, Arizona voters passed Proposition 204 with 62% support. The measure prohibits the confinement of calves in veal crates and breeding sows in gestation crates.
- On June 28, 2007, Oregon Governor Ted Kulongoski signed a measure into law prohibiting the confinement of pigs in gestation crates (SB 694, 74th Leg. Assembly, Regular Session).
- On May 14, 2008, Colorado Governor Bill Ritter signed into law a bill, SB 201, that phases out gestation crates and veal crates.
- Germany, Switzerland, Sweden, and Austria have all banned battery cages for egg-laying hens. The entire European Union has phased out battery cages as of 2012.

=== Failed attempts ===
In addition, there have been other attempts to pass similar legislation, which were unsuccessful.

The Humane Society and other animal protection advocates have been working with the California legislature over the last twenty years to achieve the passage of laws to prohibit the cruel treatment of farm animals. They say that the bills for animal protection that they supported have been repeatedly killed in committees where agribusiness has great power.

- On January 14, 2004, the bill AB-732 died in the California Assembly's Agriculture Committee. The primary author of AB-732 was Loni Hancock of the 14th District. The bill would have banned gestation and veal crates, eventually being amended to include only veal crates.
- On May 9, 2007, the bill AB-594 was withdrawn from the California's State Assembly. The bill had been effectively killed in the Assembly Agriculture Committee, by the maneuver of gutting the contents of the bill and replacing them with language concerning tobacco cessation coverage under Medi-Cal. The primary author of AB-594 was Mervyn Dymally of the 52nd District. AB-594 was very similar to the current language of Proposition 2.
- In January 2008, Nebraska State Senator DiAnna Schimek submitted bill LB 1148 to ban the use of gestation crates for pig farmers. It was withdrawn within 5 days amidst controversy, and a kill motion was filed by State Senator Phil Erdman.

== Health and food safety ==
Animals under stress, including the stress of intensive confinement, have compromised immune systems, and thus higher levels of pathogens such as Salmonella in their intestines.

According to the Centers for Disease Control and Prevention, "Stringent procedures for cleaning and inspecting eggs were implemented in the 1970s and have made salmonellosis caused by external fecal contamination of egg shells extremely rare. However, unlike eggborne salmonellosis of past decades, the current epidemic is due to intact and disinfected grade A eggs. The reason for this is that Salmonella enteritidis silently infects the ovaries of healthy appearing hens and contaminates the eggs before the shells are formed." Supporters of Proposition 2 claim that giving egg-hens more space can prevent this type of outbreak.

Contrarily, previous research suggests that eggs from cage-farmed hens have superior structural integrity in their shells, allowing for greater resistance to penetration by the Salmonella Enteritidis pathogen and decreasing the risk of egg contamination. On the other hand, the infection of free-range hens in the California study was caused via the "fecal-oral route through contamination of the feed through feces" from rodents that had easy access to these hens. In addition to being more vulnerable to exposure from rodents, free-range hens did not have the same level of manure management as those hens kept in battery cages. This is because the cage-farmed hens had a manure belt that ran under their enclosures and transported the feces to collection receptacles, common to battery cage systems in California. On the other hand, according to a report by the Rural Industries Research & Development Corporation, the total number of bacteria on free-range eggs is 15 times greater than that found on eggs from cage-farmed hens. The Rural Industries report also postulates that the very construction of the indoor housing systems precludes the possibility of poultry and rodents existing closely, thereby potentially decreasing the possibility of cross-infection.

Supporters of Proposition 2 say that increased density of birds in battery cages leads to increased incidence of Salmonella in eggs. They also say that housing battery cages are very difficult to keep clean and are often infested by large numbers of flies and rats.

However, opponents of Prop 2 say that modern battery cages effectively separate "feces and other fluids" from eggs, and that Prop 2 would "effectively ban modern housing". The opponents go on to say that "there has not been a reported case of salmonella linked to California eggs in nearly a decade" - but noting that people get salmonella from eggs that are produced outside of California every year . Their claim about salmonella cases linked to California eggs is supported by the U.S. Centers for Disease Control and Prevention.

An article entitled "The pros and cons of cages" published in the World's Poultry Science Journal in 2001 concludes that cages result in increased hygiene and lower incidence of disease related to feces, but can result in higher rates of metabolic disorders.

An undercover investigation of Norco Ranch (a Southern California egg ranch) was completed in August and September 2008. That investigation discovered badly decomposed chicken carcasses in the same cages with hens which were still laying eggs for human consumption. The organization that performed the undercover investigation, Mercy for Animals, released the undercover video to the public whereupon the video and the investigation received wide coverage in the news media. Proponents of Prop 2 imply that close confinement was a major factor in these bird's deaths. However, Prop 2 opponents assert that Norco Ranch was in violation of many California laws already in place.

A 2004 study of California egg farms in the journal Avian Diseases finds comparatively low Salmonella prevalence in indoor housing systems, commonly used in California, as compared to cage-free and free-range housing systems. The researchers state that this low Salmonella prevalence in California egg farms reflects the "distinct geographic, climatic, production and management characteristics" of the state's egg farms. 98 percent of egg farms adhere to the California Egg Quality Assurance Plan, which is a pathogen reduction program for Salmonella in California. The study states, "The highest prevalence [was] in the free-range birds kept on the dirt floors." The California study notes that "feral cats, rodents, skunks, opossums, wild birds, and other wildlife" were seen near the free-range hens' feeding areas, and that rodents "were considered to be the biological vectors and amplifiers" of salmonella on the egg farm in the study. Studies by researchers at the Department of Bacterial Diseases of Veterinary Laboratories Agency-Weybridge in Addlestone, Surrey, UK and by researchers at veterinary and public health institutions in Norway and Denmark support the conclusion that wild animals are a significant and dangerous vector for salmonella.

Supporters of Prop 2 note that furnished cages for egg-laying hens have already been developed in Europe, which allow birds to move freely and display natural behaviors. The waste material in these systems is far less concentrated than with battery cages, and the animals are healthier and calmer with a stronger natural immunity to disease.

Opponents of Prop 2 note that a process called "traceback" is conducted by the Food and Drug Administration (FDA) and helps to maintain a safe food supply. The FDA's guidance to its staff for conducting tracebacks has sections entitled "Farm Investigations" and "Egg Processor/Packer Investigations," which contain detailed protocols explaining who goes on the farm, how the investigation is carried out, biosecurity procedures and other important steps to ensure that should an outbreak from eggs occur, the traceback would successfully reveal the original source. These opponents to Prop 2 say that California already has adequate and exemplary disease control techniques.

== Economic effects ==
In July 2008 the University of California, Davis conducted a study through their University of California Agricultural Issues Center (AIC). The study concluded that "the best evidence from a variety of sources suggests that (non-organic) non-cage systems incur costs of production that are at least 20 percent higher than the common cage housing systems". This is due to higher feed costs, higher hen laying mortality, higher direct housing costs, and higher labor costs. The study also estimated that almost the entire California egg industry would relocate to other states during the 5-year adjustment period. The study does not analyze implications for animal welfare. By demonstrating that most egg producers would leave the state, the report estimates that the initiative would not affect how eggs are produced, only where eggs are produced.

A study done by Don Bell of the University of California, Riverside estimated that eliminating battery cages for egg-laying hens will result in increased production costs of less than one cent per egg, and a recent economic study co-authored by former California finance director Tim Gage predicted, "Under Prop 2, consumers purchasing conventional eggs will likely see no change in price; consumers preferring California grown eggs could see around a penny per egg increase in cost; while those preferring cage-free eggs will see a drop in cost with a new California provider."

According to a May 2008 study by Promar International and commissioned by opponents to Prop. 2, 95% of the California $648 million egg industry and accompanying economic output would be lost by 2015, including equally significant loss of the three and half thousand jobs the egg industry employs. The study also stated that egg production costs would increase by 76%.

== Animal welfare ==
Opponents of Proposition 2 claim that California's current regulations ensure sanitary and healthy conditions for egg-laying hens in the care of law-abiding organizations. Proponents of Prop 2 say the best housing environments for farm animals must take into consideration freedom of movement and expression of normal behaviors. The American Veterinary Medical Association supports greater attention to the behavioral needs of farm animals, but has expressed concern that Proposition 2 is not sufficiently comprehensive to ensure that increases in behavioral freedom don't translate into increased risks of injury and disease (i.e., a typical welfare tradeoff). Furthermore, although Proposition 2 offers hens additional space, it doesn't address other behavioral needs such as nesting, foraging, and dust bathing.

A Canadian study completed in 2008 concluded that conventional battery cages could easily be converted into furnished colony cage systems, and asserted that perches increased hen welfare. It went on to say that hens in battery cages did not have significantly higher levels of stress measured by the hormones in blood and fecal matter. The study qualified that finding by stating: "It is possible, however, that these [stress] measures may not be sensitive enough to detect the differences in housing conditions. It is also possible that the space allocated to each bird in the conventional cages [i.e., the battery cages] in this study may have affected the results as [the battery cage] birds received nearly double the floor space of a commercial bird." The study also concluded that hens in the enriched cages lost feathers because of "wear on furnishings rather than feather pecking".

Egg farmers assert that the egg production methods that the industry has developed are meant to ensure that fundamental components of sound animal care are provided to egg-laying hens: optimal feed, light, air, water, space and sanitation for egg-laying hens. Animal welfare advocates assert that, in order to maximize profits, hens in factory farms are treated like units of production rather than as living beings. The instinctual needs of each hen are denied, and most spend their entire lives indoors in filthy, cramped conditions in immense dark warehouses. Most hens never feel the sun, never walk on grass, and many are never able to turn around without hitting cage bars or another hen.

Approximately 95% of California's egg farmers are part of the UEP certification program, in which, farmers assert, they must place top priority on health, safety, and comfort of their hens and submit to independent United States Department of Agriculture (USDA) audits. Animal welfare advocates, however, assert that UEP certification deceives shoppers by conveying a false message of humane animal care. They say that UEP certification permits routine cruel and inhumane factory farm practices such as intensive confinement in restrictive, barren cages such that the hens cannot perform many of their natural behaviors such as perching, nesting, foraging or even fully stretching their wings.

== Assertions by proponents ==
Prop 2's supporters say it is a modest measure that ends the cruel and inhumane confinement of specified animals on factory farms, requiring their living spaces to be big enough for them to turn around, lie down, and fully extend their legs and/or wings. The initiative does not require that they be kept outside of cages or live outdoors. Supporters of proposition 2 say that smaller, local, family farms will have an increased competitive edge over larger factory farms. They say that the agribusiness industry maximizes their own profits by compromising on animal welfare and human health.

== Assertions by opponents ==
Prop 2's opponents say that "Proposition 2 is a risky, dangerous and costly measure banning almost all modern egg production in California." They further claim that Proposition 2 jeopardizes food safety and public health, wipes out Californians' access to locally grown, fresh eggs, and harms consumers by driving up prices at grocery stores and restaurants and creates a dependency on eggs shipped from other states and Mexico.

== Supporters of Prop 2 ==
Key endorsements as of October 27, 2008

- The Humane Society of the United States, Sierra Club-California, California Veterinary Medical Association, California Democratic Party, Green Party of California, Peace and Freedom Party, Center for Food Safety, Consumer Federation of America, the American Society for the Prevention of Cruelty to Animals (ASPCA), United Farm Workers, Family Farm Defenders, Union of Concerned Scientists, and the California Council of Churches.
- Healthcare Professionals - The Physicians Committee for Responsible Medicine, Dr. John A. McDougall, and nearly 60 California medical professionals, including general practitioners, cardiologists, pediatricians, chiropractors, dentists, optometrists, registered nurses and more.
- California veterinary professionals—The California Veterinary Medical Association, more than 700 California veterinarians, more than 150 California veterinary medical students, the Humane Society Veterinary Medical Association, the San Diego County Veterinary Medical Association, and more than 90 veterinary hospitals and clinics.
- California farmers—More than 100 California farmers, including Bill Niman, Prather Ranch, Dobson Dairy Ranch, Eatwell Farms, Flores Ranch, Lunny Ranch, and US Farms, Inc.
- Newspapers and journalists - The New York Times, San Jose Mercury News, The San Diego Union-Tribune, Los Angeles Daily News, La Opinión, Santa Barbara News-Press, Metroactive, Sacramento News & Review, Oakland Tribune, Alameda Times-Star, Santa Cruz Sentinel, Marin Independent Journal, Palo Alto Weekly, San Jose Inside, The Almanac, Mountain View Voice, San Mateo County Times, Fremont Argus, Tri-Valley Herald, Hayward Daily Review, Whittier Daily News, Contra Costa Times, Alameda Journal, Berkeley Voice, The Montclarion, The Piedmonter, San Joaquin Herald, San Ramon Valley Times, Pasadena Star-News, San Gabriel Valley Tribune, Columnist Gary Bogue, Columnist Tom Hennessey, Columnist Nicholas Kristof, and Syndicated pet-care columnist Gina Spadafori.
- Religious organizations and leaders National and state leaders from across the religious spectrum, including: California Council of Churches IMPACT, the National Catholic Rural Life Conference, Marc Handley Andrus, Bishop of the Episcopal Diocese of California, Bishop Beverly J. Shamana, California Nevada Annual Conference of the United Methodist Church, Bishop Mary Ann Swenson, California-Pacific Conference, United Methodist Church, The Right Reverend James R. Mathes, Bishop of the Episcopal Diocese of San Diego, Dr. Richard Mouw, President of Fuller Seminary, and nearly 80 leaders of individual California congregations.
- California businesses and business owners - Nearly 300 California businesses from all walks of commerce, including restaurants, artists, pet-related stores and services, real estate brokers, grocery stores, health care professionals, construction, and more
- Leading nonprofit and advocacy organizations—More than 45 organizations across the country that are working to address the public health, environmental, social justice and animal welfare impacts of factory farming, including the Pew Commission on Industrial Farm Animal Production, Center for Science in the Public Interest, Compassion in World Farming, United Farm Workers, the César Chávez Foundation, Defenders of Wildlife, Greenpeace USA, the Organic Consumers Association, National Black Farmers Association, Institute for Agriculture and Trade Policy, Farm Forward.
- Animal protection charities—More than 100 organizations, including more than a dozen California humane societies and SPCAs in Los Angeles, San Francisco, Sacramento and beyond; the State Humane Association of California; and leading national organizations like Farm Sanctuary, the National Federation of Humane Societies, Best Friends Animal Society, and Animals and Society Institute.
- Elected officials and local governments—The city councils of Los Angeles, San Francisco, Davis, Santa Monica, Santa Cruz, West Hollywood, and Berkeley; US Senators Barbara Boxer and Dianne Feinstein; State Superintendent of Public Instruction Jack O'Connell; US Representatives John Campbell (Orange County), Elton Gallegly (Santa Barbara), Barbara Lee (East Bay), Brad Sherman (San Fernando Valley), and Maxine Waters (Los Angeles); Mayors Gavin Newsom (San Francisco), Marty Blum (Santa Barbara), and Craig Litwin (Sebastapol); state Senators Dean Florez (Bakersfield/Fresno), Sheila Kuehl (Los Angeles), Christine Kehoe (San Diego) and Carole Migden (San Francisco); Assembly Speaker pro Tem Sally Lieber (Mountain View); and Assembly members Mike Davis (Los Angeles), Merv Dymally (Los Angeles), Loni Hancock (Albany), Paul Krekorian (Glendale), Mark Leno (San Francisco), Lloyd Levine (Van Nuys), and Jose Solorio (Anaheim); and former Mayor Richard Riordan (Los Angeles) and former US Representative John Burton (San Francisco)
- Celebrities & public figures—Nearly 70 well-known experts, actors, actresses, chefs, and others. Robert F. Kennedy, Jr., Dr. Jane Goodall, Matthew Scully, Eric Schlosser. Ed Begley, Jr., Bill McKibben, Tobey Maguire, Ellen DeGeneres, Daryl Hannah, Alicia Silverstone, and Ed Asner. Authors Michael Chabon, Emily Deschanel, Jared Leto, Phil Radford of Greenpeace, J. M. Coetzee, Jonathan Safran Foer, Jonathan Franzen, Nicole Krauss, Michael Pollan, Alice Sebold, and Alice Walker.
- See complete list of endorsements at http://www.yesonprop2.com/index.php?option=com_content&view=article&id=52&Itemid=85

== Opponents of Prop 2 ==
Californians for SAFE Food is a coalition of companies and associations. Key endorsements as of October 16, 2008 are:

Food Safety & Public Health Experts & Veterinarians (titles and affiliations are used for identification purposes only): Alex Ardans, DVM, Former Director University of California Animal Health & Food Safety Laboratory System , Art Bickford, DVM, Former Associate Director, Turlock, University of California Animal Health & Food Safety Laboratory System, Patricia Blanchard, DVM, Branch Chief, Tulare, University of California Animal Health & Food Safety Laboratory System, Bruce R. Charlton, DVM, PhD, Branch Chief, Turlock, University of California Animal Health & Food Safety Laboratory System, Roy Curtiss III, PhD, Director, Center for Infectious Diseases & Vaccinology, Arizona State University, and Craig Reed, DVM, Former Deputy Administrator, Food Safety & Inspection Service, United States Department of Agriculture among many other experts.

Labor Unions: California Conference Board of the Amalgamated Transit Union, California Teamsters Public Affairs Council, General Teamsters Local Union 386, UNITE HERE, and United Food and Commercial Workers Western States Council.

Newspapers: San Francisco Chronicle, Los Angeles Times, The Sacramento Bee, The Bakersfield Californian, Orange County Register, The Fresno Bee, The Modesto Bee, Antelope Valley Press, The Press Democrat, Napa Valley Register, Chico Enterprise-Record, Eureka Reporter, Visalia Times-Delta, Long Beach Press-Telegram, Colusa County Sun-Herald, Hollister Free Lance, Redding Record Searchlight, and The Milpitas Post.

Veterinary & Avian/Poultry Organizations: American Veterinary Medical Association, American Association of Avian Pathologists, American College of Poultry Veterinarians, Association of California Veterinarians, Association of Veterinarians in Egg Production, Association of Veterinarians in Turkey Production, California chapter of American Registry of Professional Animal Scientists, California Food Animal Veterinary Medical Association, California Poultry Federation, Pacific Egg and Poultry Association, and Poultry Science Association.

Latino Organizations: California Hispanic Chambers of Commerce, Latino Voters League, Mexican American Political Association, and National Latino Congreso.

African American Organizations & Opinion Leaders: Pastor Amos Brown, Third Baptist Church, The Black American Political Association of California, The California Black Chamber of Commerce, California State Conference of the NAACP, Greater Sacramento Urban League, Los Angeles African American Women's Political Action Committee, Minority Health Institute, Inc., Oakland NAACP Branch, Sacramento NAACP Branch, Southern Christian Leadership Conference of Greater Los Angeles, Stockton NAACP Branch, Western Regional Council on Educating Black Children, and Youth and College Division of the NAACP.

View a larger list of opponents of at

Another opponent is animal rights philosopher and law professor, Gary Francione.

== Legal actions against Prop 2 opponents ==
The American Egg Board (an egg industry funded promotional group) has been barred by a U.S. District Court Judge from using $3 million allocated to it by the USDA until after the 2008 November election. This ruling came after a lawsuit by supporters of Prop 2 claiming the USDA improperly set aside the $3 million in federal funds into the Egg Board's coffers to oppose Prop 2. The lawsuit asserted that the Egg Board's planned use of the money would be an illegal political use of public funds.

United Egg Producers, the U.S. egg industry's national trade association leading the fight against Prop 2, is currently under a criminal investigation by the United States Justice Department for price-fixing and intentionally driving up the cost of eggs.

== Campaign donations ==
A total of $10.6 million was donated to the Yes on 2 campaign, and a total of $8.9 million was donated to the No on 2 campaign.

== Field Poll results ==
According to a Field Poll released on July 22, 2008, after hearing a description of Prop 2, 63% of likely California voters polled said they would vote "yes", 24% said "no", and 13% were undecided.

Prop 2 opponents disparaged that poll by noting that few respondents (16 per cent) had been aware of the issue. They also claimed that polling was skewed by the measure's original title, The California Prevention of Farm Animal Cruelty Act, which was later changed by the attorney general's office to Standards for Confining Farm Animals.

However, results of a more recent poll were quite similar to the first. A 9/25/2008 SurveyUSA poll of likely California voters who have either decided or are leaning towards voting a certain way on Prop 2 gave the following results: "72% Yes, 10% No, 17% still not certain. Support for the proposition is strong among all demographic groups and in all regions of the state."

A Field Poll released on 10/31/2008 showed that there had been "very little change in voters' initial support for Prop 2". The poll found that 60% of likely California voters polled said they would vote "yes", 27% said "no", and 13% were undecided.

== Election results ==
Proposition 2
Choice	Votes	%
For	8,203,769	63.42
Against	4,731,738	36.58
Total	12,935,507	100.00
Valid votes	12,935,507	94.12
Invalid/blank votes	807,670	5.88
Total votes	13,743,177	100.00
Registered voters/turnout		79.42

More Californians voted for Prop 2 (more than 8 million) than for any other initiative in state history.

== Accessory bill, AB 1437, covering out-of-state eggs ==
Proposition 2, itself, does not prohibit out-of-state eggs produced in extreme-confinement conditions from being sold in California. After Proposition 2 passed, California egg farmers were concerned that they would be at a disadvantage when competing against out-of-state egg producers who could underprice them by continuing to practice inhumane treatment of hens. The California egg farmers and animal advocates made common cause to get the legislature to pass a bill to require out-of-state eggs to meet the same requirements that Proposition 2 implemented for in-state eggs. Accordingly, then-Assemblyman Jared Huffman authored AB 1437 The bill passed the legislature and was signed into law by Governor Schwarzenegger on July 6, 2010.

Proposition 2 and AB 1437 both took effect on the same day: January 1, 2015. Thus, the combination of the two laws prohibits eggs produced in extreme-confinement conditions from being sold in California, no matter where they were produced.

== Litigation against Prop 2 or AB 1437 ==
In 2012, William Cramer, an egg farmer in Riverside, California, filed a lawsuit alleging that Prop 2 is unconstitutionally vague under the Fourteenth Amendment's due-process clause because it lacks details about the exact cage size required to avoid criminal prosecution. Cramer's suit was dismissed by U.S. District Judge John F. Walter of the Central District of California. Cramer appealed his case to the U.S. Court of Appeals for the Ninth Circuit. On February 4, 2015, the Ninth Circuit upheld Prop 2 against Cramer's suit.

In 2014, Missouri Attorney General Chris Koster filed a lawsuit alleging the law is unconstitutional under the Commerce Clause of the US constitution. The states of Nebraska, Alabama, Iowa, Kentucky, and Oklahoma joined the case. On October 2, 2014, U.S. District Judge Kimberly J. Mueller of the Eastern District of California found that the states lacked standing to pursue their claims on behalf of egg farmers. This case is on appeal.

== Implementation ==
On May 6, 2013, the California Department of Food and Agriculture issued regulations stipulating the minimum number of square inches of floorspace per laying hen that shall be deemed to constitute compliance with Prop 2 and AB 1437. The regulations say, in part: "An enclosure containing nine (9) or more egg-laying hens shall provide a minimum of 116 square inches of floor space per bird." Enclosures containing fewer hens must provide a larger number of square inches per hen. The complete specifications are in a table in this document:

- "New Shell Egg Food Safety Regulations" (PDF). University of California Division of Agriculture and Natural Resources. California Department of Food and Agriculture. 15 June 2013.

== See also ==
- Animal law
- Animal Welfare
- California Penal Code section 597t
- Factory Farming
- Agricultural law
- California law
- November 2008 California elections
- List of California ballot propositions
