= Wolterstorff =

Wolterstorff is a toponymic surname, derived from German Waltersdorf. Notable people with this surname include:

- Nicholas Wolterstorff (born 1932), American philosopher
- Robert M. Wolterstorff (1914–2007), American Bishop
- Robert Wolterstorff (screenwriter) (Bob Wolterstorff, * 1949), American screenwriter and producer
- Willy Wolterstorff (1864–1943), German paleontologist and herpetologist
