= Dunston =

Dunston may refer to:

== Places in England ==
- Dunston, Tyne and Wear, in the Metropolitan Borough of Gateshead
  - Dunston railway station
  - Dunston Power Station, now demolished
- Dunston, Lincolnshire, a small village
- Dunston, Norfolk, a small village
- Dunston, Staffordshire, a small village
- Dunston, Derbyshire; see Lenton Priory
- Dunstone, Devon; see List of places in Devon

== Other uses ==
- Dunston (surname)
- Dunston UTS F.C., a football club based in Dunston, Tyne and Wear, England

== See also ==
- Dunstan (disambiguation)
