= James Mathes =

The Right Reverend James Mathes
- Church: Episcopal Church (United States)
- Diocese: San Diego

Orders
- Ordination: 1991 (deacon); 1992 (priest)
- Consecration: 5 March 2005 by Richard Sui On Chang

James Robert Mathes was the fourth bishop of the Episcopal Diocese of San Diego. After studies at Sewanee: The University of the South and Virginia Theological Seminary, Mathes was ordained to the diaconate in 1991 and to the priesthood in 1992. He was consecrated on March 5, 2005, by William Dailey Persell, Richard Sui On Chang and his predecessors, Robert M. Wolterstorff and Gethin Benwil Hughes. He resigned effective July 1, 2017.

== See also ==
- List of Episcopal bishops of the United States
- Historical list of the Episcopal bishops of the United States
