= Dunstan (disambiguation) =

Dunstan is a saint and tenth-century Archbishop of Canterbury.

Dunstan may also refer to:

== Fiction ==
- Dunstan Cass, a greedy villain in the novel Silas Marner, by George Eliot
- Dunstan, a historical novel about the tenth-century saint by British author Conn Iggulden

== Places ==
=== Electoral districts ===
- Dunstan (New Zealand electorate)
- Electoral district of Dunstan, in South Australia

=== Other types of places ===
- Clyde, New Zealand, New Zealand, formerly Dunstan
- Dunstan, Northumberland, England, a small hamlet close to the village of Craster
- Dunstan, Maine, Maine, United States
- Lake Dunstan in New Zealand

== Other uses ==
- Dunstan (surname), includes a list of people with the surname
- Dunstan chestnut (cultivar), the most common chestnut in North America
- Dunstan High School in Alexandra, New Zealand

== See also ==
- Dunstanburgh Castle
- Dunston (disambiguation)
- St Dunstan's (disambiguation)
