= Susan Brown Snook =

American Episcopal bishop (born 1962)

The Right Reverend Susan Brown Snook
- Bishop of San Diego
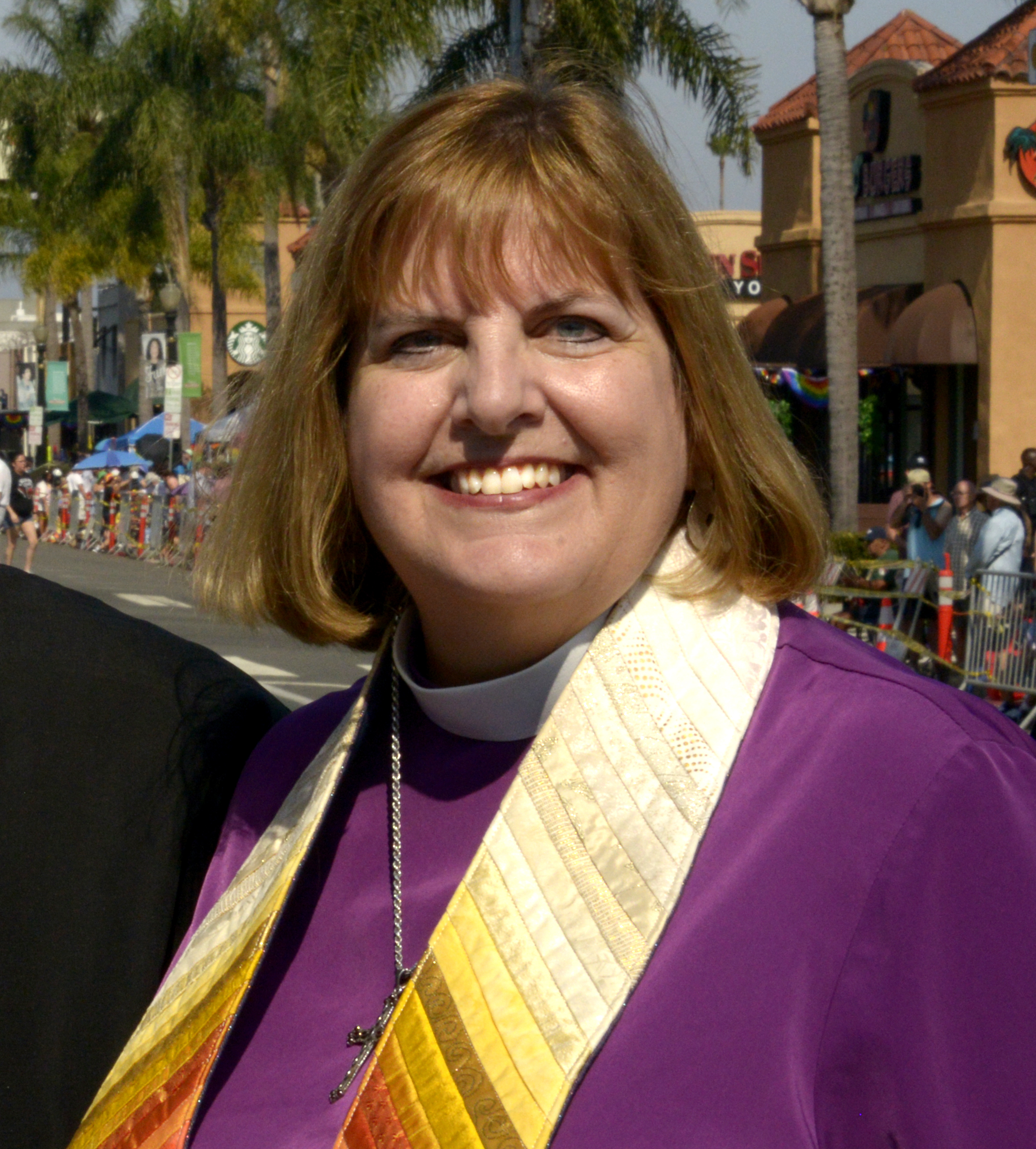
- Brown Snook in 2023
- Church: The Episcopal Church
- Diocese: Diocese of San Diego
- In office: 2019 to present
- Predecessor: Katharine Jefferts Schori

Orders
- Ordination: 2003 (priest)
- Consecration: by June 15, 2019

Personal details
- Born: 1962 (age 63–64)
- Denomination: Anglicanism

Susan Brown Snook (born 1962) is the fifth bishop of the Diocese of San Diego in The Episcopal Church. She had worked as a certified public accountant and then as a director of Christian education and a director of lay ministries at an Episcopal church in Arizona before seminary. In 2012, she co-founded the Acts 8 Movement, a group dedicated to proclaiming resurrection in the Episcopal Church.

== Ordained Ministry ==
Following her ordination as priest in 2003, she served several parishes in the Diocese of Arizona. In 2006, she started a new congregation in Scottsdale, the Episcopal Church of the Nativity, which grew to an average Sunday attendance of 200 in its own church building in its first decade. She has been a leading voice in calling the Episcopal Church to invest in starting new congregations. She worked with others, including Frank S. Logue, to add $2.8 million more dollars to the $3 million budgeted for evangelism and church planting for the Episcopal Church's 2016-2018 budget. In 2017, she became canon in the Diocese of Oklahoma for church growth and development.

=== Episcopal ministry ===
On June 15, 2019, she was consecrated and installed as bishop in St. Paul's Cathedral in San Diego, California. She is the first woman to lead the diocese, which includes 44 churches in Southern California and Arizona.
