= Diocese of San Diego =

Diocese of San Diego may refer to:

- Episcopal Diocese of San Diego
- Roman Catholic Diocese of San Diego
