= California Penal Code section 597t =

Law requiring exercise area for confined animals

Section 597t of the Penal Code of California is a California State criminal law which requires that animals confined in enclosed areas be provided with an adequate exercise area. Even though this section of the Penal Code does not define "adequate exercise area", it would seem to prohibit the confinement of calves in veal crates, as well as the confinement of hens in battery cages and the confinement of sows in gestation crates. However, this law seems to have never been enforced.

There is not a single court case in California where a defendant was found guilty of or even prosecuted for violating 597t. Because this law has never been applied in a court case, there is no precedential standard according to which animal confinement may be judged. Since 597t is a criminal law, it may not be enforced by private entities through civil action, and may only be enforced by a public prosecutor filing a criminal action, or by corporations formed for the prevention of cruelty to animals under the California Corporations Code § 10400

== Text ==
§ 597t of the California Penal Code states:

Every person who keeps an animal confined in an enclosed area shall provide it with an adequate exercise area. If the animal is restricted by a leash, rope, or chain, the leash, rope, or chain shall be affixed in such a manner that it will prevent the animal from becoming entangled or injured and permit the animal's access to adequate shelter, food, and water. Violation of this section constitutes a misdemeanor. This section shall not apply to an animal which is in transit, in a vehicle, or in the immediate control of a person.

== Court Cases ==
Three California cases cite 597t. However, the courts in all these cases refrained from determining whether the concerned animal farming practice violates this statute.

=== Farm Sanctuary, Inc. v. Corcpork, Inc. ===
Farm Sanctuary claimed that Corcpork's use of gestation crates violates Pen. Code section 597t and thus constitutes an unfair business practice under Business and Professions Code sections 17200 et. seq. In Farm Sanctuary, Inc. v. Corcpork, Inc., 2007 Cal. Unpub. LEXIS 634, the court refused to hear Farm Sanctuary's claim that violations under 597t constitute unfair business practice under B&PC 17200. According to California Proposition 64 (2004), an individual or group may only sue for unfair business practices if that individual or group has suffered actual injury and has lost money or property as a result of unfair competition. The court issued summary judgment in favor of Corcpork, and did not address whether the confinement of sows in gestation crates violates 597t.

=== Humane Society of the United States v. State Bd. of Equalization ===
Under the Code of Civil Procedure section 526(a), any individual taxpayer or group of taxpayers may seek a judgment restraining wasteful government expenditures. Wasteful government expenditures are understood as government funding for illegal activities. The Humane Society of the United States sued the California State Board of Equalization, arguing that sales tax exemptions for battery cages are illegal government expenditures in that they enable factory farmers to confine hens in a way that violates Pen. Code section 597t. However, in Humane Society of the United States v. State Bd. of Equalization, 152 Cal. App. 4th 349 (2007), the court ruled that sales tax exemptions for battery cages are not illegal and so do not constitute wasteful government expenditures under Code Civ. Proc. section 526(a). The court did not address whether battery cages violate Pen. Code section 597t.

=== Animal Legal Defense Fund v. Mendes ===
Animal Legal Defense Fund (ALDF) sued Victor L. Mendes for confining calves in veal crates, which ALDF considered to be a violation of Pen. Code 597t. In Animal Legal Defense Fund v. Mendes, 160 Cal. App. 4th 136 (2008), the court ruled that ALDF had no private right to enforce 597t through civil action. Since 597t is a criminal law, it may only be enforced by a public prosecutor, or by a private corporation which meets particular standards. The court did not address whether the confinement of calves in veal crates violates 597t.

There are two ways in which private entities may initiate legal action against persons who violate anticruelty criminal laws. One way is through Section 10400 corporations. According to Corporations Code section 10400, a corporation may be formed for the purpose of preventing cruelty to animals, and may pursue legal action against anyone for violating anti-cruelty laws. The articles of incorporation for these corporations are to be filed with the Secretary of State and endorsed by the Department of Justice or by a judge of the superior court of the county in which the principal office of the corporation is located. Only these corporations may apply for appointment of humane officers whose duty it is to enforce laws for the prevention of cruelty to animals.

Private persons and corporations who are not incorporated under Corp. Code section 10400 may initiate legal action against persons who violate anticruelty criminal laws by making a complaint under oath to a magistrate authorized to issue warrants in criminal cases. A magistrate who receives a complaint alleging ongoing or potential animal abuse in a particular location must issue a warrant to a sheriff, police officer, or officer of a Section 10400 corporation, authorizing him or her to enter and search the building mentioned in the complaint and to arrest any person there who is violating, or intending to violate, anticruelty laws.

The ALDF is not a Section 10400 corporation. Its articles of incorporation were not endorsed by the Department of Justice or by a judge of any superior court for the purpose of giving it quasi-governmental powers described in Section 10400. Since it is not a Section 10400 corporation, it does not have a humane officer who is authorized to pursue legal action against violators of anticruelty criminal laws. The ALDF did not make a complaint before a magistrate authorized to issue warrants. Because this case is not initiated by a Section 10400 corporation, or by a complaint made before a magistrate, it does not fall under any of the methods of enforcement provided by law.

== See also ==
- Animal Welfare
- California Proposition 2 (2008)
- 2018 California Proposition 12
- Factory Farming
