= Graeme Dunstan =

Graeme Dunstan may refer to:

- Graeme Dunstan (activist) (born 1942), Australian activist
- Graeme Dunstan (footballer) (born 1952), Australian rules footballer
