= St Dunstan's Church =

St. Dunstan's Church may refer to:

== Canada ==
- St. Dunstan's Basilica, Charlottetown, Prince Edward Island

== United Kingdom ==
- St Dunstan's, Stepney, London Borough of Tower Hamlets
- St Dunstan-in-the-East, City of London
- St Dunstan-in-the-West, City of London
- Church of St. Dunstan, Mayfield, East Sussex
- St. Dunstan's, Canterbury, Kent
- St Dunstan's Church, Snargate, Kent
- St Dunstan's Church, Woking, Surrey
- Church of St Dunstan, Liverpool, Merseyside
- St Dunstan's Church, Cranford, London Borough of Hounslow
- Church of St Dunstan, Baltonsborough, Somerset
- Church of St Dunstan, Monks Risborough, Buckinghamshire
- St Dunstan's Church, Mayfield, East Sussex
- St Dunstan's Church, Feltham, London Borough of Hounslow

== United States ==
- St. Dunstan's Church of the Highlands Parish, Shoreline, Washington
- St. Dunstan's Episcopal Church (San Diego, California)
