= Eric Dunstan =

British radio broadcaster (1894–1973)

- Dunstan in Death at Broadcasting House (1934)
- Born: Eric Cipriani Dunstan; 6 April 1894; Nottingham, England
- Died: May 1973 (aged 79); Nice, France
- Occupations: Radio broadcaster, commentator
- Years active: 1924–1952

Eric Cipriani Dunstan (6 April 1894 – May 1973) was a British radio broadcaster, news announcer and commentator in the 1920s and 1930s, described as "The Man with the Golden Voice".

== Life and career ==
He was born in Nottingham. His middle name was the result of his great-grandfather, the composer Philip, Cipriani Potter. Dunstan attended Radley College, and won a singing scholarship to Magdalen College, Oxford. He became an academical clerk and member of the choir as a bass singer, and met fellow student the Prince of Wales. He served in the First World War, initially in Kitchener's Army in Italy, and then in the Buffs (East Kent Regiment), where he became a bombing officer. However, he developed tuberculosis, and was allowed to return to Magdalen College, from where he graduated in 1917.

After briefly working for the British consulate in Seville, he joined the Red Cross on the Italian front, and was involved in the Battle of Caporetto in which the Red Cross lost 80 of its ambulances. Following the end of the war, he took a post as assistant to the Governor of Fiji. He eventually returned to London, and worked at Selfridges in Oxford Street, soon becoming private secretary to Gordon Selfridge. After Selfridge's wife and mother both died, Dunstan became a close adviser, living at Selfridge's house in Lansdowne House on Berkeley Square at a time when the store was the most popular and successful in the city.

In 1924, he started work at the BBC, as one of the first radio announcers in Britain, though he claimed that the work required "no more than a clear speaking voice and a modicum of common sense". The Director-General, John Reith, sent Dunstan to India in 1926, to set up the Indian Broadcasting Company, but after three years the venture failed and Dunstan returned to Britain as a senior announcer on BBC radio. In 1929, he announced the General Election results, until Reith decided in the evening that he would take over. When listeners complained that Reith was speaking too quickly and unclearly, Dunstan reported this to Reith, who indicated that he would continue. An angry Dunstan left the building, "as a protest against the arbitrary interference with announcers in the performance of their not very easy duty on a critical occasion", and went to a party at Gordon Selfridge's attended by journalists. As a result, his resignation was prematurely reported, and accepted by Reith.

Dunstan was immediately taken on by The Star newspaper as a journalist, and as the first radio critic on a daily newspaper. He remained there for eight years. He also joined British Movietone News, the first sound newsreel in Britain, as a commentator on events. He became nationally known as "the man with the golden voice", appeared in a cameo role in the 1934 film Death at Broadcasting House, and commentated on important and solemn occasions such as the Silver Jubilee of George V in 1935, the king's funeral the following year, the coronation of George VI in 1937, and the death of Pope Pius XI in 1939. His association with funerals led to him being called, informally, "the voice of doom".

Working with American modernist architect Barry Dierks, he bought and started to restore and landscape an old mill house, Moulin de la Mourachonne, at Mouans-Sartoux near Cannes. He regularly took holidays in other Mediterranean areas, and on one trip met Flora Sebastian (née Stifel), the American wife of Romanian aristocrat and architect Georges Sebastian. They built the Dar Sebastian house (later the Hammamet Cultural Center) in Tunisia, where their other guests included Winston Churchill and Wallis Simpson. Flora and her husband divorced, and in 1937 she and Dunstan married in Paris. However, three months later she died in Mexico, after her chauffeur left her unattended in a car with the handbrake off, and it careered down a steep slope and crashed.

Dunstan became wealthy from his resulting inheritance, and returned to Provence, where he, Dierks and garden designer Eric Sawyer were able to upgrade the plans for Dunstan's house and gardens at Moulin de la Mourachonne. After the Second World War, he financed new facilities at the Sunnybank Hospital catering for Anglophone expatriates in Cannes. In 1952, he returned to Movietone in order to give a commentary on the funeral of George VI.

He died in Nice in May 1973, aged 79.
