= St Dunstan's School =

St. Dunstan's School may refer to:

== South Africa ==
- St. Dunstan's College (South Africa)

== United Kingdom ==
- St Dunstan's Community School, Glastonbury, Somerset
- St Dunstan's College, Catford, London

== United States ==
- St. Dunstan's Episcopal High School, Saint Croix, US Virgin Islands

== See also ==
- Saint Dunstan's University, Prince Edward Island, Canada
