= Dunston (surname) =

Dunston is a surname. Notable people with the surname include:

- Bryant Dunston (born 1986), American-Armenian basketball player
- John Dunston (born 1952), English headmaster
- Richard Dunston, English shipbuilder
- Shawon Dunston (born 1963), American baseball player
