= St. Dunstan's Episcopal Church (San Diego, California) =

Coordinates: 32°47′45″N 117°2′59″W

St. Dunstan's Episcopal Church is an Episcopal church in San Diego, California. It belongs to the Episcopal Diocese of San Diego.

== History ==
What became St. Dunstan's College Chapel at San Diego State College was originally St. Paul's Episcopal Church. Opened in 1887 in an English Gothic Revival building with a steeple at Eighth Avenue and C Street, it was designed by Wilcox & Johnson of Minnesota. When St. Paul's outgrew its building, it was moved to the college campus, which did not then have a chapel. In 1948, the building was cut into 10 pieces, moved and reassembled at 5198 College Avenue on two lots which had been purchased for $4750. According to an article in The San Diego Union-Tribune on May 13, 1948, the "entire cost of moving, re-assembling and remodeling the church was estimated at $40,000. When the church was built in 1887, the cost was $7750."

The enrollment at San Diego State University (then San Diego State College) in 1965 had increased to more than 16,000, and plans were being made to initiate an extensive building program and had to increase the size of the campus considerably. This threatened Parish expansion, together with the total lack of parking space during the week, was gradually strangling the growth of the parish.

In March, 1967, the property on College Avenue was sold to San Diego State University for $173,000.

In January 1970, they moved the chapel to Lemon Grove, California to become the chapel of St. Philip's Episcopal Church, with the old St. Philip's building becoming the parish hall. Stained glass windows from the original chapel made the transition to the current church building but were destroyed in a fire on March 18, 1972. The windows were replaced when the chapel was restored, then rededicated on June 16, 1974.

The congregation of the college chapel, in a new building as St. Dunstan's Church, continues to worship in the San Diego community of San Carlos.
