= St. Paul's Cathedral (San Diego) =

Episcopal cathedral in California, US

St. Paul's Cathedral, San Diego
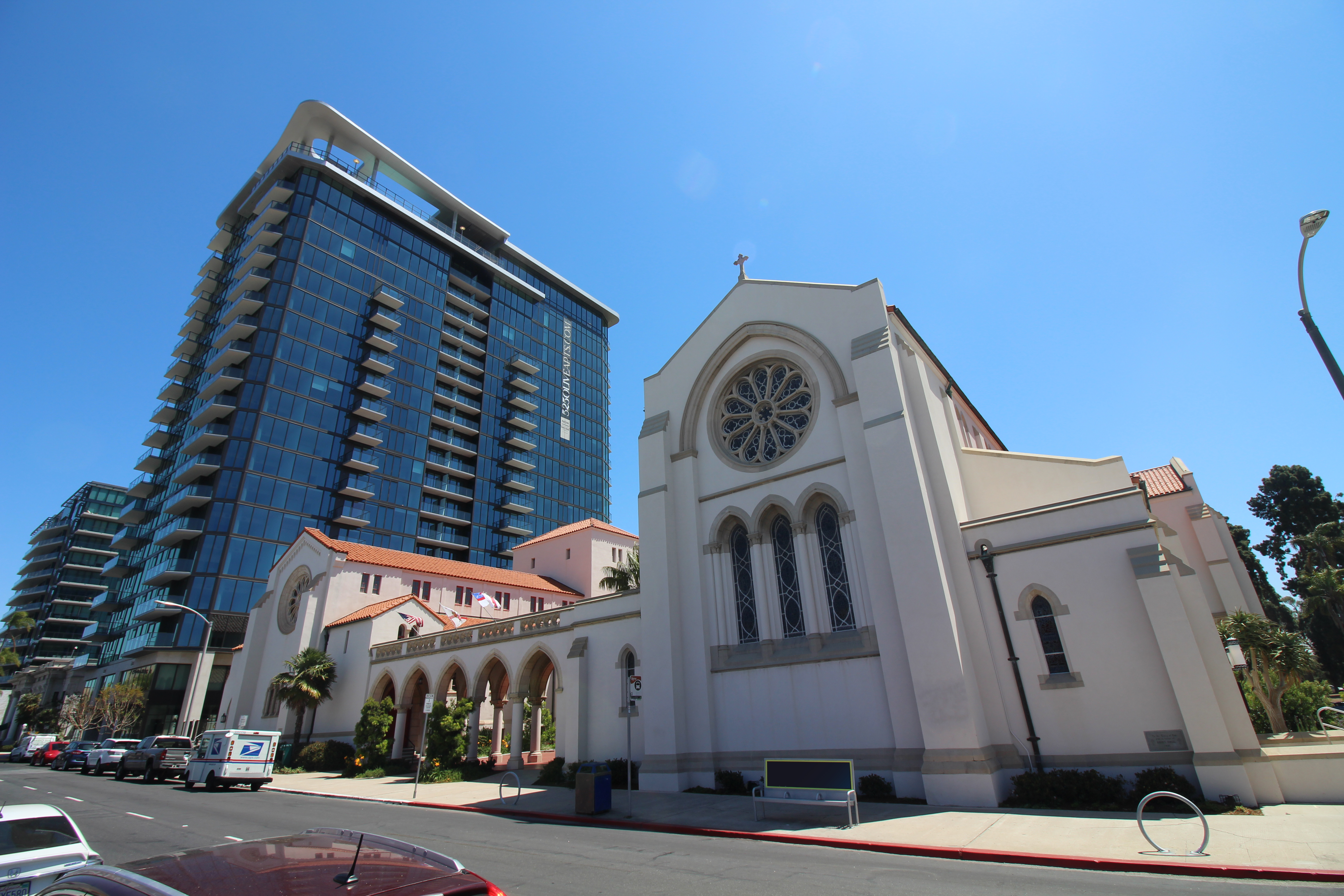
- St. Paul's Episcopal Cathedral in 2022
- St. Paul's Cathedral, San Diego
- 32°44′1″N 117°9′35″W
- Location: 2728 Sixth Avenue; San Diego, California
- Country: United States
- Denomination: Episcopal
- Website: stpaulscathedral.org

History
- Status: Church
- Founded: 1869 as Holy Trinity, reincorporated at St. Paul's in 1887

Architecture
- Functional status: Active
- Architect: Philip Frohman
- Style: Neo-Gothic
- Groundbreaking: 1950
- Completed: First worship in 1951; technically still unfinished. Named as cathedral in 1985

Administration
- Province: Province VIII
- Diocese: Episcopal Diocese of San Diego

Clergy
- Dean: The Very Rev. Allisyn Thomas (interim)
- Priest: The Rev. Canon Richard Hogue Jr.

St. Paul's Cathedral is an Episcopal church in Bankers Hill Although the building itself was only completed in 1951, it traces its origins to the first Protestant church in San Diego, founded in Old Town in 1853.

In 2016, the church reported 1,243 members; in 2025, it reported 679 members. Plate and pledge financial support reported by the church in 2025 was $1,291,068. Average Sunday Attendance (ASA) reported by the church in 2025 was 318 persons. This was a relative decrease from ASA of 607 persons reported in 2015.

== Church philosophy ==
The cathedral is the home to an active and growing Episcopal/Anglican parish community. Calling itself "the Cathedral 4 the City", St. Paul's describes its mission as "bringing together the ancient rhythms of liturgy and sacred music set to a progressive beat that thoughtfully engages the critical issues of social justice facing our world".

The church practices "open Communion," using a variation on the Iona Community Invitation: "This is the table not of the church but of Jesus Christ. It is made ready for those who love him and who want to love him more. So come, you who have much faith and you who have little; you who have been here often and you who have not been for a long time or ever before; you who have tried to follow and you who have failed; come, not because the Church invites you; it is Christ, and he invites you to meet him here."

The church is grounded in a high-church traditional liturgy and expression of Christian faith, but at the same time maintains robust interfaith bonds throughout the community. The cathedral also works with the local Islamic community to promote religious tolerance.

== Worship ==
St. Paul's uses Rite II of the Episcopal Book of Common Prayer. Every Sunday, an early service at 8:00 am is followed by a full choral Eucharist at 10:30, complete with a large procession, use of incense, and chanted liturgy. There is also a traditional Choral Evensong at 5:00 pm.

During the week, there is morning and evening prayer, held virtually. Every Friday there is a 12:00 pm Eucharist in the Chapel of the Holy Family (a small chapel located within the cathedral).

In addition to the regular services and the busy seasons of Christmas and Easter, there are several special services unique to the cathedral, including a labyrinth walk on New Year's Eve, a "Zydeco Mass" on Mardi Gras, neighborhood processions on Palm Sunday, St. George's Day, and a Blessing of the Animals.

== Education and community ==
The cathedral has a spectrum of adult education offerings each Sunday. A forum is conducted at 9 am which presents topics of interest ranging from religious practice to environmental concerns to local charitable and volunteer opportunities. During the year there are often ongoing classes during the week. Children's programming includes age-appropriate Sunday gatherings and child care during the 10:30 Eucharist. Numerous small groups and ministries meet regularly.

In the 1950s, the then-rector of St. Paul's Church, Harold Robinson, joined with lay leaders to develop a senior housing ministry, originally known as St. Paul's Episcopal Home. What is now called St Paul's Senior Homes and Services is governed by a board of directors, of which the Dean of St Paul's Cathedral is the ex officio President. Amongst other services, SPSHS participates in the Senior Community Centers for the Homeless.

== Music ==
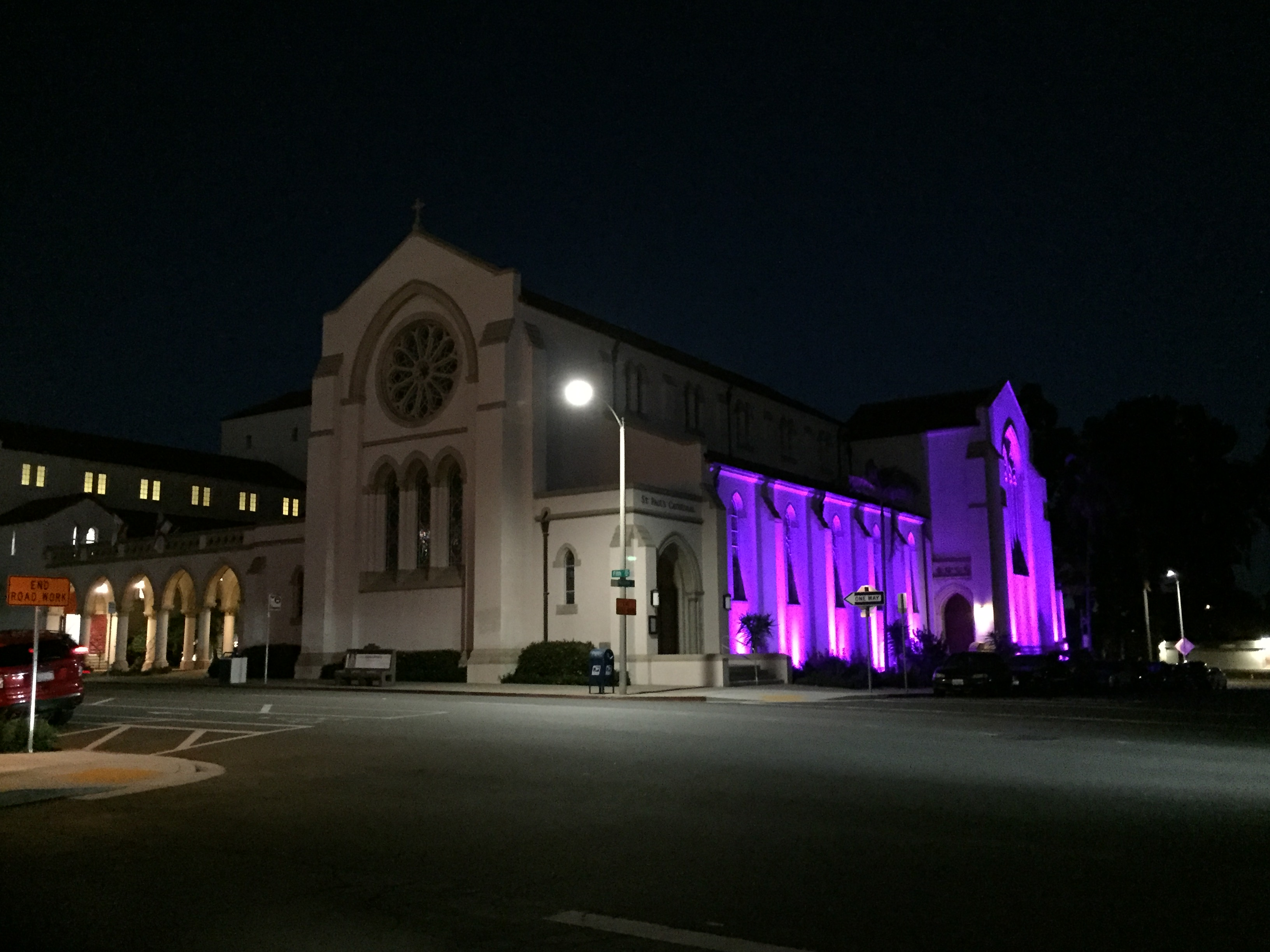
St Paul's LED lighting at night

The church is noted for its music program led by Bruce Neswick, Interim Director of Music. There are three choirs: the regular adult choir that sings at the 10:30 Sunday Eucharist, and the Cathedral Choristers (boys and men) and the St Cecilia's Choir (girls and men) which alternate singing at weekly Evensong. Many concerts are held at the cathedral, including chamber music and choral works, and are open to the public. The cathedral is the home of the Pacific Academy of Ecclesiastical Music (PACEM) and maintains an extensive music library.

The cathedral's Aeolian-Skinner organ is a historical instrument that encompasses part of the first organ in the city of San Diego, built in 1887 and moved with the church to its present location in the 1950s. It was expanded several times with additional ranks and keyboards. In 2011, the Cathedral raised funds for organ restoration, and the instrument was dismantled and sent to Missouri for a complete restoration. A temporary, digital organ was installed in its place. The restored Aeolian-Skinner organ was back in place by December 2012.

The organ is used for weekly concerts (Tuesday at noon) in addition to its role in worship services. The Civic Organist of San Diego since 2001, Carol Williams, is also Organist in Residence at St. Paul's.

== Social justice and outreach ==
The cathedral works actively with the Uptown Community to serve the needy throughout the community. As part of that work, every year St. Paul's houses a group of homeless adults for several weeks on campus. There is a food distribution weekly in the cathedral parking lot which is offered in conjunction with Jewish Family Services. The cathedral community is also active in promoting immigration justice. It is home to a Spanish-speaking congregation and carries out active Hispanic outreach. A major charitable effort is the support of Vida Joven, a home for foster children whose parents are incarcerated in Tijuana Mexico, . Environmental issues ("creation care") are also a strong concern and the Cathedral seeks to be as green as possible. The Alternative Gift Fair during the Advent season promotes environmentally responsible gifts and fair trade.

Cathedral marchers at San Diego's Gay Pride Parade 2011.

The St. Paul's Cathedral community is explicitly welcoming of lesbian, gay, bisexual and transgender (LGBT) people. The cathedral works actively for equality by hosting conferences and movie screenings. In 2005, St. Paul's held the funeral service for a gay Catholic man, John McCusker, who was denied a funeral by the Roman Catholic Diocese of San Diego. St. Paul's fields one of the biggest groups marching in the annual San Diego Gay Pride Parade, and in 2010 received the Stonewall Service Award from the San Diego Gay Pride organization. The cathedral was outspoken in opposition to California's ballot initiative Proposition 8 in 2008, which took away the right of same-sex couples to marry. After the passage of Proposition 8, St. Paul's held an ecumenical healing service so that LGBT people and their allies could grieve together.

In 2010 the 4th Bishop of San Diego, the Rt. Rev. James R. Mathes, approved a policy by which individual parishes could choose to recognize LGBT couples in a blessing service. St. Paul's Cathedral was the first parish in the diocese to take advantage of the new policy, and several couples had their marriages or domestic partnerships blessed by a special liturgy. In 2012, the General Convention of the Episcopal Church approved a church-wide provisional liturgy for same sex blessings. Following the overturning of California Proposition 8 by the US Supreme Court in June 2013, Bishop Mathes approved same-sex marriages in the diocese, subject to the same rules as blessings. The first wedding between a same-sex couple at St. Paul's was held in July 2013. Same-sex couples seeking marriage or blessing at St. Paul's are subject to similar policies as for heterosexual couples seeking marriage, including pre-marital counseling.

== Governance and clergy ==
Typical of an Episcopal cathedral, St. Paul's is led by a dean (currently The Very Reverend Allisyn Thomas). The cathedral is the formal seat of the bishop of the Episcopal Diocese of San Diego. Oversight is provided by a board of directors (cathedral chapter), a board of elected representatives from the cathedral community and the diocese. There are numerous affiliated clergy, many of whom are retired, and some of whom are canons of the cathedral. There are also several lay canons who serve in administrative positions. Several volunteer groups contribute to the smooth running of the cathedral and its worship services. These include the altar servers, the vergers, the altar guild and sacristans, the ushers, the docents, and the greeters.

=== Deans ===
- 1978–1994: The Very Reverend James Earle Carroll DD (retired; returned as interim dean 2002–2003)
- 1996-2001: The Right Reverend John Bryson Chane (later Bishop of Washington, D.C.; now retired)
- 2003–2012: The Very Reverend Scott Richardson
- 2014–2026: The Very Reverend Penelope Bridges
- 2026-Present: The Very Reverend Allisyn Thomas (Interim Dean)

== History and building ==
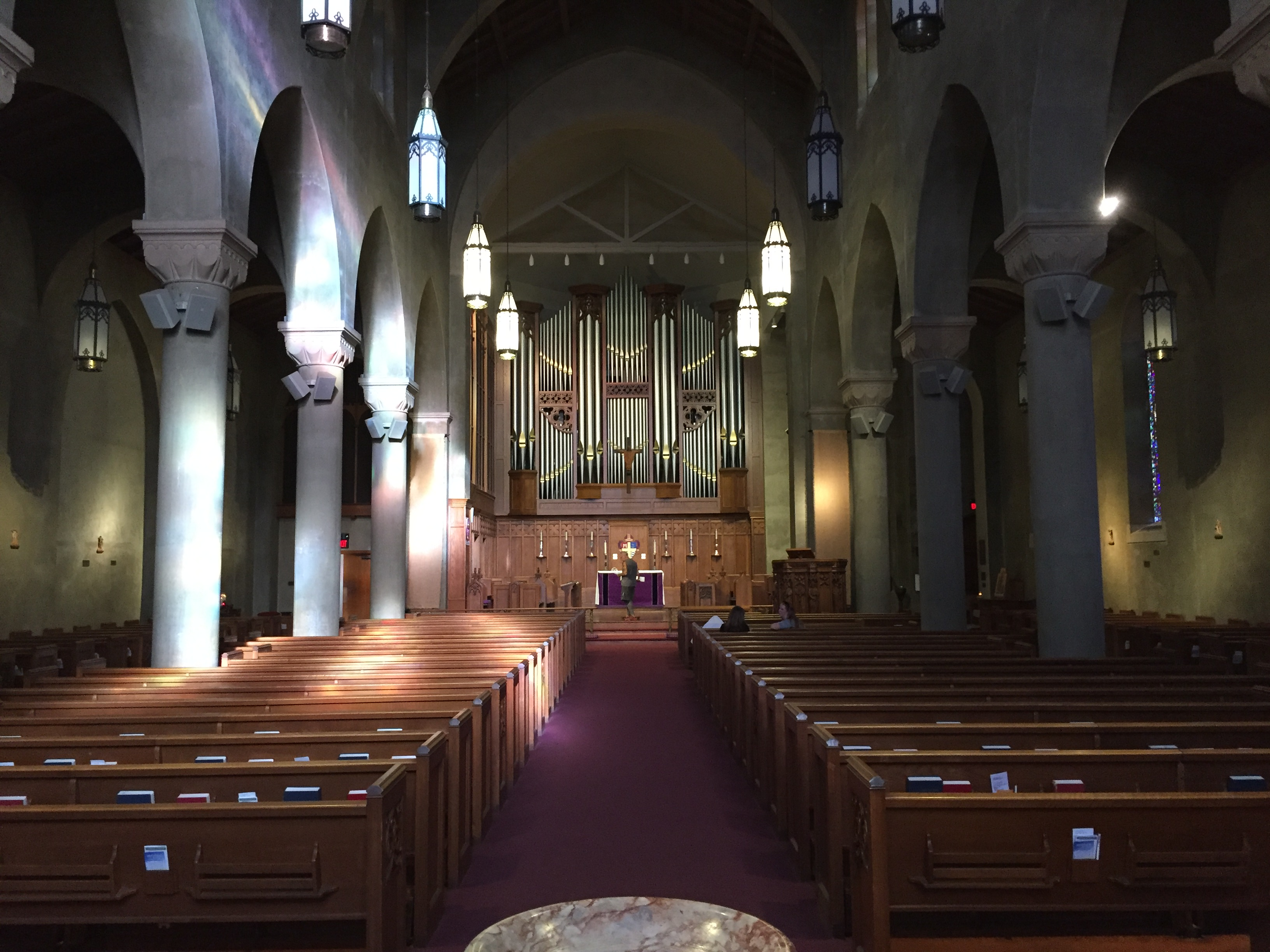
Nave and chancel of St. Paul's Cathedral

The parish traces its roots to the first Protestant congregation in San Diego founded at Old Town in 1853. This eventually became the parish of Holy Trinity downtown at 8th and C streets, where it re-incorporated as St Paul's in 1887. In 1919, as St. Paul's was outgrowing its home downtown, the vestry purchased property opposite Balboa Park. They recruited Philip Frohman, a leader of the neo-Gothic style who designed the National Cathedral in Washington, D.C., to design the new campus with a sizable church. Apparently the vestry expected an eventual separation from the Los Angeles Diocese that would make St. Paul's the Cathedral of San Diego, since they planned a large structure. The Great Hall was completed in 1929, but the church construction was severely delayed by the Great Depression and conflicts with the architect, so groundbreaking did not occur until 1950. The first service in the new church was held in 1951, although the building was not fully finished. Additions over the years included a chapel and an office wing.

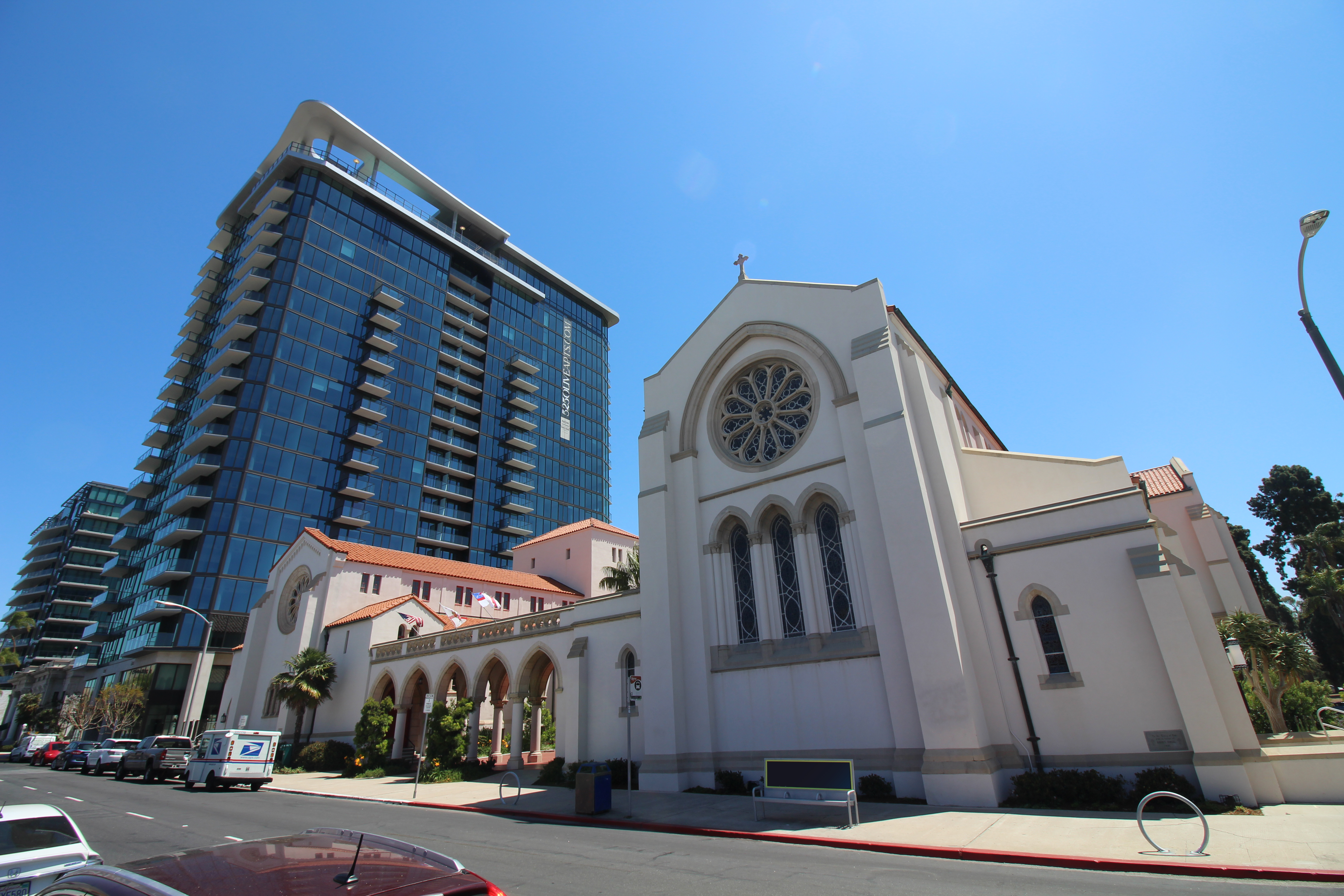
Photo of St. Paul's Episcopal Cathedral taken on May 13, 2022, with the newly built 525 Olive Street Building in the background.

In 1973, the long-anticipated creation of the Episcopal Diocese of San Diego occurred, by dividing the large Los Angeles diocese. In 1985, St. Paul's became the cathedral of the new diocese.

=== Redevelopment plan ===
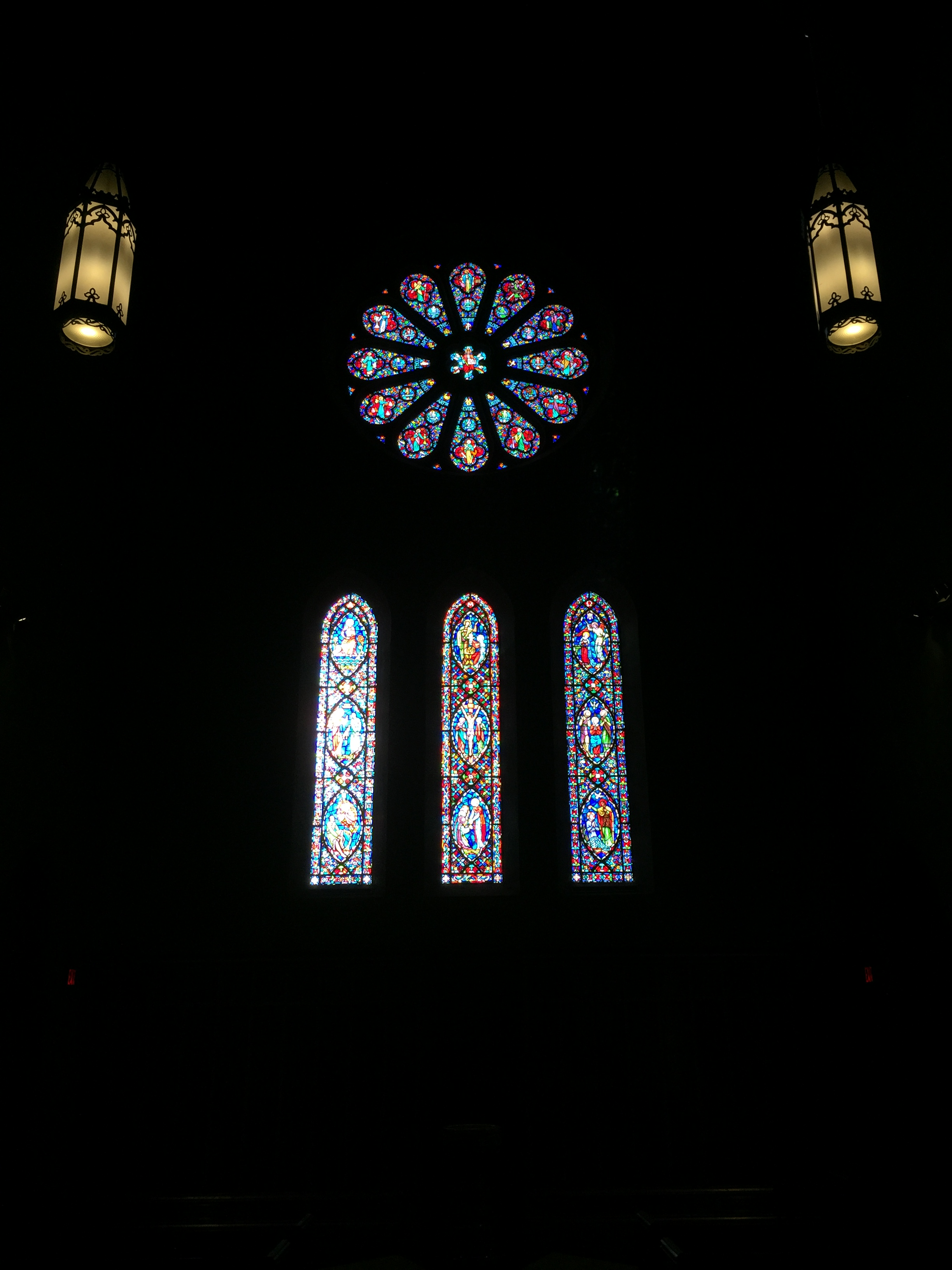
Detail of St Paul's rose window

In 2011, the cathedral completed a planning process to develop its property. This plan proposes two residential tower buildings with ground-level retail on property adjacent to the cathedral, as well renovation of the campus with new offices and off street parking. The funds will be used to leverage the cathedral's activities in the community.

== See also ==
- List of the Episcopal cathedrals of the United States
- List of cathedrals in the United States
