= Graeme Dunstan (footballer) =

Australian rules footballer

Personal information
- Full name: Graeme J. Dunstan
- Born: 29 December 1952 (age 73)
- Original team: Fish Creek
- Height: 189 cm (6 ft 2 in)
- Weight: 80 kg (176 lb)

Playing career^{1}
Years	Club	Games (Goals)
1972–1974	Collingwood	31 (39)
1975–1981	Norwood	129
- ^{1} Playing statistics correct to the end of 1981.

Graeme Dunstan (born 29 December 1952) is a former Australian rules footballer who played with Collingwood in the Victorian Football League (VFL) and Norwood in the South Australian National Football League (SANFL).

Dunstan made appearances in three seasons for Collingwood, the club his father Maurie had played with. He also had a younger brother, Ian, who played at Footscray and North Melbourne.

He made his VFL debut in Collingwood's 1972 semi final against St Kilda, replacing an injured Peter McKenna at full-forward. It was his only game of the year but in 1973 he was selected more regularly and played 14 times. In 1974 he kicked 21 goals from 16 games and played in an elimination final. At the end of the season he transferred to Norwood. This meant that both Dunstan's first and last league games were finals. He was also fortunate enough to play in 26 wins, from just 31 games.

Dunstan was a member of Norwood's 1975 premiership team and played a total of 129 SANFL games. He then became involved in the South Australian Amateur Football League, coaching both Athelstone and Tea Tree Gully.

From 1998 to 2004, he was the General Manager of the Sturt Football Club. Dunstan currently serves as the State League Football Manager/Player Movement Coordinator for the Adelaide Football Club.
