= Alex Dunstan =

Australian rules footballer

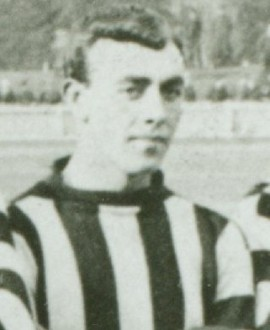
- Dunstan in 1908

Personal information
- Full name: Alexander Fitzroy Dunstan
- Born: 14 July 1885; Fitzroy, Victoria, Australia
- Died: 20 November 1964 (aged 79); Parkville, Victoria, Australia
- Original team: Warragul
- Height: 174 cm (5 ft 9 in)
- Weight: 70 kg (154 lb)

Playing career^{1}
Years	Club	Games (Goals)
1908	Collingwood	10 (2)
- ^{1} Playing statistics correct to the end of 1908.

Alexander Fitzroy Dunstan (14 July 1885 – 20 November 1964) was an Australian rules footballer who played for the Collingwood Football Club in the Victorian Football League (VFL).
