= George Dunstan (footballer) =

Australian rules footballer, born 1904

Personal information
- Full name: George William Henry Dunstan
- Born: 19 July 1904; Claremont, Western Australia
- Died: 29 June 1965 (aged 60); Traralgon, Victoria

Playing career^{1}
Years	Club	Games (Goals)
1926	St Kilda	1 (0)
- ^{1} Playing statistics correct to the end of 1926.

George William Henry Dunstan (19 July 1904 – 29 June 1965) was an Australian rules footballer who played with St Kilda in the Victorian Football League (VFL).
