= Ian Dunstan =

Australian rules footballer and coach

Personal information
- Born: 28 February 1955 (age 71)
- Original team: Fish Creek
- Debut: 26 May 1973, Footscray vs. North Melbourne, at Arden Street
- Height: 185 cm (6 ft 1 in)
- Weight: 80 kg (176 lb)

Playing career^{1}
Years	Club	Games (Goals)
1973–1982	Footscray	172 (135)
1984	North Melbourne	6 (4)
Total		178 (139)
- ^{1} Playing statistics correct to the end of 1984.

Career highlights
- 3× Charles Sutton Medal: (1979, 1981, 1982)

Ian Dunstan (born 28 February 1955) is a former Australian rules footballer who played for the Footscray Football Club and the North Melbourne Football Club in the Victorian Football League (VFL).

Originally recruited from Fish Creek in South Gippsland, he is the son Maurie Dunstan and brother of Graeme Dunstan, both former Collingwood players. He was a tallish ruck-rover with great ability to win the ball and great skill at kicking straight in the direction of goal. His early years with Footscray were nonetheless patchy, and he lost his place in the senior side after a slump in 1974 and again in 1976 – though he returned to play well in the last round draw with Carlton and in his only final against Geelong a week later.

Paradoxically, it was whilst Footscray were declining from the middle bracket to perennial contenders for the wooden spoon with St Kilda and Melbourne that Dunstan rose to the heights not only of Footscray's top running players, but even to representing Victoria. On 1 July 1978 Dunstan and Kelvin Templeton kicked against St Kilda a record VFL/AFL total for two players in one team of 22 goals 12 behinds (144 points), narrowly beating the total of Doug Strang and Jack Titus for Richmond against North Melbourne on 9 May 1931. Of this Dunstan kicked seven goals, three behinds but had over thirty kicks overall, many of which led to Templeton's record total of twenty-four scoring shots, which contributed to Footscray breaking Carlton's 1969 record VFL score. During the last quarter it was said that Dunstan, who never otherwise kicked five in a match, aimed to reach double figures.

As a result of this and other performances, Dunstan represented Victoria several times in the last three years of the late 1970s. As Footscray struggled further owing to the club's limited financial resources – going from seven wins in 1978 and 1979 to only five in 1980, two in 1981 and three in 1982 – Dunstan won three best and fairest awards in 1979, 1981 and 1982 but Footscray's finances and a youth policy caused them to allow Dunstan to cross to North Melbourne for the 1983 VFL season. However, he would miss the whole season after breaking his arm in a practice game, and then suffered another injury at training while on the comeback trail. Dunstan finally made his debut for North Melbourne in Round 1 of the 1984 VFL season against Carlton at VFL Park. On a forgettable day for the club, with the Kangaroos going down by 137 points, Dunstan was among the few North players to put in a respectable performance, gathering 20 disposals and kicking one goal. He played the first three games in the seniors but it was clear his best days were beyond him and afterward he played only three more senior matches.

At the end of 1984 Ian Dunstan retired from the VFL and played briefly with Werribee in the Victorian Football Association. He later joined struggling Association club Sunshine where he had the unfortunate fate to be coach of the senior club when it was expelled from the competition mid-season in 1989.
