= Gethin Benwil Hughes =

Gethin Benwil Hughes was third bishop of the Episcopal Diocese of San Diego. Hughes was ordained to the diaconate in 1967 by John Thomas (bishop of Swansea and Brecon) and to the priesthood by the same bishop in 1968. He served as Bishop of San Diego from 1992 to 2005.

== See also ==
- List of bishops of the Episcopal Church in the United States of America
