= Maurie Dunstan =

Australian rules footballer

Personal information
- Full name: Maurice Dunstan
- Born: 25 March 1929
- Died: 17 May 1991 (aged 62)
- Original team: Preston
- Height: 185 cm (6 ft 1 in)
- Weight: 80 kg (176 lb)
- Position: Centre half-forward

Playing career^{1}
Years	Club	Games (Goals)
1949–1954	Collingwood	72 (118)
- ^{1} Playing statistics correct to the end of 1954.

Maurie "Mocha" Dunstan (25 March 1929 – 17 May 1991) was an Australian rules footballer who played with Collingwood in the Victorian Football League (VFL).

Dunstan had been on Collingwood's radar since his late teens but was only convinced by the club to join them after spending two seasons with Preston in the Victorian Football Association. During his early career at Collingwood, the young centre half-forward was also serving an apprenticeship in an engineering unit of the Australian Army.

Although he missed the first four rounds of the 1951 VFL season, Dunstan topped Collingwood's goal-kicking with 40 goals, including a bag of eight against Hawthorn at Glenferrie Oval. He was their top goal-kicker again in 1952, when he kicked 43 goals, but was goal-less in the finals series and finished on the losing team in the 1952 VFL Grand Final.

He played in 13 of the 18 rounds in the 1953 home and away season but was then struck down with appendicitis. As a result of his illness, as well as a leg injury, he missed out on participating in Collingwood's 12th premiership, with Terry Waites replacing him in the team for the finals.

His misfortunes in 1953 weren't the only time he had spells on the sidelines, over the course of his short career he suffered breaks on his ankle, hands, toe and ribs.

Dunstan later coached Fish Creek in the Alberton Football League. Two sons, Graeme Dunstan and Ian Dunstan, would both be recruited to the VFL from Fish Creek.
