= Robert M. Wolterstorff =

First bishop of the Episcopal Diocese of San Diego

Robert Munro "Bob" Wolterstorff (August 29, 1914 – April 24, 2007) was first bishop of the Episcopal Diocese of San Diego. Born in St. Paul, Minnesota, he was a graduate of St. Ambrose College in Davenport, Iowa, and Seabury-Western Theological Seminary in Evanston, Illinois. He was consecrated Bishop of San Diego on March 30, 1974, and served until 1982.

== See also ==
- List of bishops of the Episcopal Church in the United States of America
