= Episcopal Diocese of San Diego =

Diocese of the Episcopal Church in the United States

Diocese of San Diego

Location
- Country: United States
- Ecclesiastical province: Province VIII

Statistics
- Congregations: 44 (2024)
- Members: 9,477 (2025)

Information
- Denomination: Episcopal Church in the United States
- Rite: Episcopal
- Cathedral: St. Paul's Cathedral

Current leadership
- Bishop: Susan Brown Snook

Map
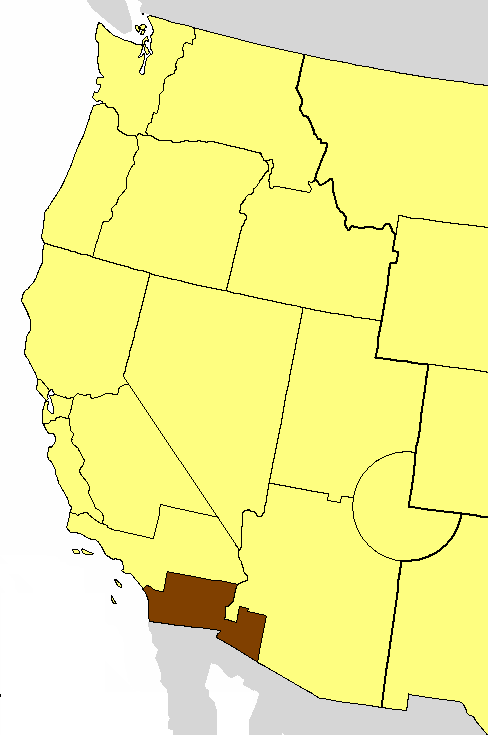
- Location of the Diocese of San Diego

Website
- edsd.org Diocese website

The Episcopal Diocese of San Diego is the diocese of the Episcopal Church in the United States of America with jurisdiction over San Diego County, Imperial County and part of Riverside County in California plus all of Yuma County in Arizona. It is in Province 8 and encompasses some 44 congregations. It was created in 1973 by splitting off from the Episcopal Diocese of Los Angeles. Its cathedral, St. Paul's Cathedral, is in San Diego. The diocesan offices are located in Ocean Beach at 2083 Sunset Cliffs Blvd., San Diego, CA 92107.

In 2025, the diocese reported average Sunday attendance (ASA) of 3,676 persons. Plate and pledge financial support reported by the diocese in 2025 was $13,453,217. From 2015 to 2025, membership declined from 14,294 persons to 9,477 persons.

== List of bishops ==
The bishops of San Diego have been:

1. Robert M. Wolterstorff, (elected December 7, 1973, consecrated March 30, 1974, retired 1982)
2. C. Brinkley Morton, (1982–1992)
3. Gethin Benwil Hughes, (1992–2005)
4. James Robert Mathes, (2005–2017)
5. Katharine Jefferts Schori (Assisting), (2017-2019)
6. Susan Brown Snook (2019–present)

== History ==
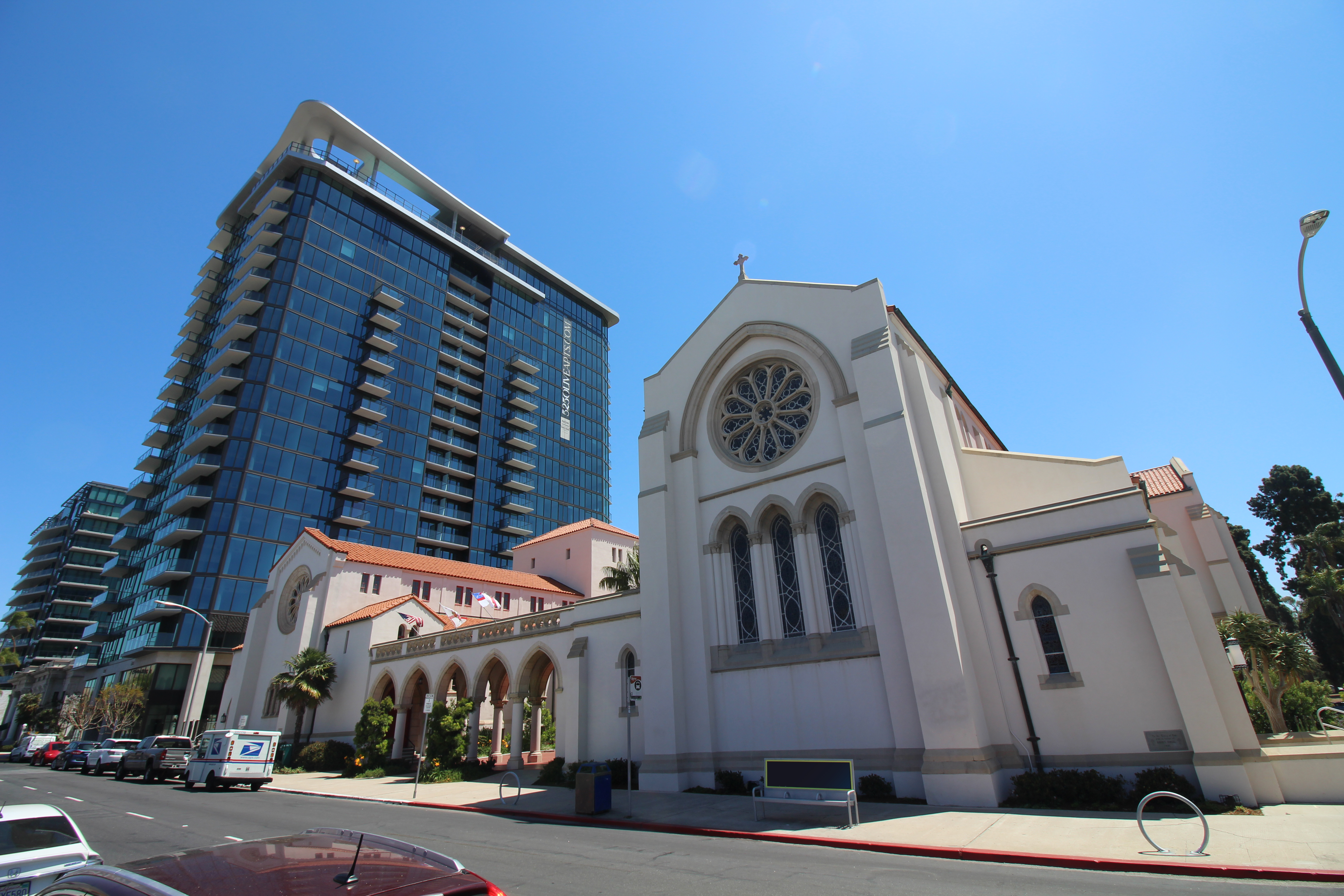
St. Paul's, the diocese's cathedral since 1985

The Episcopal Diocese of San Diego was founded in 1973, over 100 years after the first Episcopal service took place in the region. The area which makes up the Diocese stretches from Sun City to the Mexican border, from the Pacific Ocean to Yuma, Arizona. Until 1973, it was part of the Episcopal Diocese of Los Angeles.

After Episcopal bishop William Ingraham Kip, a New Englander, was shipwrecked with his wife off the coast of Point Loma, he celebrated his first Eucharist in California at the courthouse in Old Town on Sunday, January 22, 1854.

In 1973, a separate diocese was formed from the Diocese of Los Angeles and consisted of 37 congregations and nearly 20,000 members. Robert Wolterstorff, formerly rector of St. James by-the-Sea in La Jolla, was consecrated as the first bishop of the Diocese of San Diego in 1974, ending his tenure in 1982.

In 1985 St. Paul's was named a cathedral. In 1983, Elizabeth II and her husband Prince Philip, Duke of Edinburgh visited St. Paul's.

As of 2024, the Episcopal Diocese of San Diego consists of 44 churches and over 20,000 members across San Diego County, Imperial County, southern Riverside County and Yuma County, Arizona. The San Diego diocese is a part of the greater Episcopal Church which is a member province of the worldwide Anglican Communion.

== Departures of members ==
Since 2003 nine churches experienced the departure of large numbers of their congregation over growing discontent with the theological liberalism of the Episcopal Church. Women's ordination and the ordination of openly gay, partnered bishops are some of the issues that encouraged these members to leave. Some dissident groups attempted to retain control of their church buildings and property, but in 2008, the California Court of Appeal ruled for the Diocese and upheld the authority of Bishop Mathes to dismiss parish vestry members and clergy who sought to take a parish out of The Episcopal Church.

== Same-sex marriages ==
The Episcopal Church provides "wide pastoral latitude" to individual bishops on the subject of blessing same sex couples. In 2010, Mathes approved a policy by which individual parishes could, after a self study period, choose to recognize LGBT couples in a blessing service.

== See also ==
- List of Succession of Bishops for the Episcopal Church, USA
- St. Dunstan's Episcopal Church (San Diego, California)
